= Jimmy Snowden =

American white supremacist

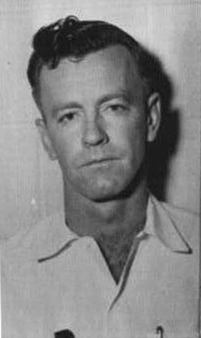
- Jimmy Snowden's mugshot, taken in late 1964
- Born: James Snowden; September 21, 1933; Lauderdale County, Mississippi, U.S.
- Died: July 7, 2008 (aged 74); Hickory, Mississippi, U.S.
- Occupation: Truck driver
- Spouse: Mary Green
- Children: 3
- Status: Deceased
- Motive: White supremacy
- Conviction: Conspiracy to deprive rights
- Penalty: 3 years imprisonment

Details
- Victims: James Chaney, 21; Andrew Goodman, 20; Michael Schwerner, 24
- Country: United States
- State: Mississippi

James Snowden (September 21, 1933 – July 7, 2008) was an American truck driver and white supremacist. He was arrested as a co-conspirator in the 1964 murders of James Chaney, Andrew Goodman, and Michael Schwerner in Philadelphia, Mississippi, for transporting the kidnapped activists to a remote location to be killed. He was a member of the White Knights of the Ku Klux Klan. He was sentenced in 1967 by federal district judge William Cox to three years for depriving the murdered men of their civil rights.

== Background ==
Snowden was born in Lauderdale County, Mississippi, as the second youngest child to William D. Snowden and Essie A. Snowden. He had two sisters, Myrtle E. Snowden and Mary H. Snowden, and two brothers, William E. Snowden and John C. Snowden. At the time of the murders, aged 31, Snowden lived in Meridian, where he worked for Meridian Laundry.

== Crime ==
Klansman James Jordan testified that Snowden was among the men who gathered at Akin's Mobile Homes in Meridian, Mississippi to meet Edgar Ray Killen, who had instructed them about the three civil rights workers in jail in Philadelphia and needed to hurry before they were released. Klansman Horace Doyle Barnette said Snowden traveled with him to Philadelphia, where Killen showed the jail where the trio was being held and instructed them on where to wait behind an old warehouse. After the three civil rights workers were released from jail at 10 p.m., the Klansmen pursued them in a high-speed chase. The trio pulled the station wagon over, and Sheriff's Deputy Cecil Price ordered them into his patrol car. Barnette identified Snowden as the one who then drove the station wagon to a remote road, where the trio were executed. Jordan identified Snowden as one of those present at the murder scene. Barnette said Snowden rode with him in his car to the dam, where the bodies were buried. Snowden was still with them at about 2 a.m. when fellow Klansman and alleged co-conspirator Lawrence A. Rainey, who was Sheriff of Neshoba County at the time, warned the others not to talk. Barnette said he drove back to Meridian and dropped Snowden off at Akin's Mobile Homes.

== Conviction ==
Snowden was indicted on February 28, 1967. He was later convicted of violating the civil rights of James Chaney, Andrew Goodman and Michael Schwerner on October 20, 1967. On December 29, 1967, Judge William Harold Cox sentenced Snowden to three years in federal prison. However, only two of the three years were spent with Snowden behind bars: he was at FCI Texarkana until December 1971 and then transferred to FCI Lompoc until his release on August 29, 1972. Snowden was reportedly "roughed up" in prison by black inmates.

== Personal life ==
Snowden was a truck driver. When he was released from prison, Snowden returned to trucking jobs in Meridian. Snowden resided in Hickory, Mississippi, during the last years of his life. Snowden was married to Mary Joyce Green (1936–2013). They had one son, Davie Snowden (b. 1963), and two daughters, Vicky L Snowden and Brenda Faye Snowden. Davie Snowden was arrested for shoplifting in July 2013. Snowden's grandson, Thomas Davie Snowden (b. 1991) was arrested October 2012 in Mobile, Alabama, as a fugitive.

While reporting about the death of fellow trial defendant Olen Lovell Burrage on March 18, 2013, New York Times journalist Douglas Martin claimed that James T. Harris was the only surviving defendant who was tried for the murders, thus implying that Snowden had died by this point in time.

== See also ==
- Samuel Bowers
- Olen Lovell Burrage
- Edgar Ray Killen
- Cecil Price
- Lawrence A. Rainey
- Alton Wayne Roberts
- Herman Tucker
- Civil Rights Movement
- United States v. Price
