= Attack on Terror: The FBI vs. the Ku Klux Klan =

1975 American television film

- Genre: Drama
- Written by: Don Whitehead; Calvin Clements
- Directed by: Marvin J. Chomsky
- Starring: Ned Beatty; John Beck
- Music by: Mundell Lowe
- Country of origin: United States
- Original language: English

Production
- Executive producer: Quinn Martin
- Producer: Philip Saltzman
- Production locations: Bastrop, Texas; San Marcos, Texas; Sam Houston National Forest; Coldspring, Texas; Huntsville, Texas; Groveton, Texas
- Cinematography: Jacques R. Marquette
- Editor: Jerry Young
- Running time: 215 minutes
- Production companies: Quinn Martin Productions; Warner Bros. Television

Original release
- Network: CBS
- Release: February 20 – February 21, 1975

Attack on Terror: The FBI vs. the Ku Klux Klan is a 1975 American two-part made-for-television drama film which dramatizes the events following the 1964 abduction and murders of Chaney, Goodman, and Schwerner in Mississippi. In this, it is similar in theme to the later 1988 movie Mississippi Burning, though some names and details were changed, and the approximate storyline of both productions is preceded by the events portrayed in the 1990 TV movie Murder in Mississippi.

Attack on Terror starred Ned Beatty, John Beck, Marlyn Mason, Billy Green Bush, Dabney Coleman, Virginia Gregg, George Grizzard, Rip Torn, Sheila Larken, Hilly Hicks, Wayne Rogers, and Johnny Haymer.

== Cast ==
- Ned Beatty as Deputy Sheriff Ollie Thompson (fictionalized representation of Cecil Price)
- John Beck as George Greg
- George Grizzard as Attorney Clay
- Rip Torn as Imperial Wizard Glen Tuttle (fictionalized representation of Sam Bowers)
- Wayne Rogers as FBI Special Agent Don Foster (fictionalized representation of John Proctor)
- Dabney Coleman as FBI Special Agent Paul Mathison
- Andrew Duggan as FBI Inspector Ryder (fictionalized representation of Joseph Sullivan)
- James Hampton as Harry Dudley (KKK member)
- Billy Green Bush as Dave Keene (KKK member)
- L. Q. Jones as Officer Roy Ralstop (KKK member)
- Mills Watson as Dee Malcom (KKK member)
- Peter Strauss as Ben Jacobs (fictionalized representation of assassination victim Michael Schwerner)
- Hilly Hicks as Charles Gilmore (fictionalized representation of assassination victim James Chaney)
- Andrew Parks as Steven Bronson (fictionalized representation of assassination victim Andrew Goodman)
- Ed Flanders as Ralph Paine (fictionalized representation of Justice Department Assistant Attorney General for Civil Rights John Doar)
- Luke Askew as Aaron Cord (fictionalized representation of Alton Wayne Roberts)
- Geoffrey Lewis as Sheriff Ed Duncan (fictionalized representation of Lawrence Rainey)
- Paulene Myers as Mrs. Gilmore (fictionalized representation of Fannie Lee Chaney)
- Sheila Larken as Linn Jacobs (fictionalized representation of Rita Schwerner)

== Production ==
The Calvin Clements script was based on Don Whitehead's book, Attack on Terror: The F.B.I. Against the Ku Klux Klan in Mississippi (pub. Funk & Wagnalls, 1970).

== Accolades ==
Attack on Terror: The FBI vs. the Ku Klux Klan was nominated for an Emmy Award in the category Outstanding Art Direction for Variety or Nonfiction Programming.

== See also ==
- Civil rights movement in popular culture
