= Herman Tucker =

Implicated in the murders of three civil rights workers in Mississippi in 1964

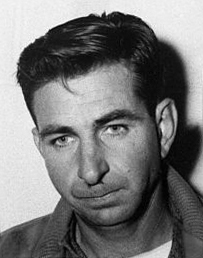
- Late 1964 mugshot of Tucker
- Born: September 2, 1928; Neshoba County, Mississippi, U.S.
- Died: March 14, 2001 (aged 72); Neshoba County, Mississippi, U.S.
- Occupations: Heavy equipment operator, truck driver
- Spouse: Catherine Tucker
- Status: Acquitted
- Criminal charges: Conspiring to injure, oppress, threaten, and intimidate

Herman Tucker (September 2, 1928 – March 14, 2001) was an American truck driver and heavy equipment operator from Neshoba County, Mississippi who was implicated in the murder of three civil rights workers in June 1964. Prosecutors alleged that Tucker used a bulldozer to bury the bodies of James Chaney, Andrew Goodman, and Michael Schwerner in an earthen dam on Olen Burrage's farm. A jury acquitted Tucker in 1967.

== Biography ==
Tucker was a born in and was a lifelong resident of Neshoba County, Mississippi. He was a veteran of the United States Army. At the time of the murders, Tucker lived with his wife in the Hope community a few miles west of Philadelphia. Tucker was never identified by a witness or informant as a Klan member.

=== The murders of Chaney, Goodman, and Schwerner ===
In the afternoon of June 21, 1964, Chaney, Goodman, and Schwerner arrived at Longdale, Mississippi to inspect a burned-out church. They left Longdale around 3 p.m. They were to be in Meridian by 4 p.m. that day. The fastest route to Meridian was through Philadelphia. At the fork of Beacon and Main Street their station wagon sustained a flat tire. It is possible that a shot was fired at the station wagon's tire. Rainey's home was near the Beacon and Main Street fork. Deputy Cecil Price soon arrived and escorted them to the county jail. Price released the trio as soon as the longest day of the year became night which was about 10 p.m. The three were last seen heading south along Highway 19 toward Meridian.

The disappearance of the three men was initially investigated as a missing persons case. The civil rights workers' burnt-out car was found near a swamp three days after their disappearance. An extensive search of the area was conducted by the Federal Bureau of Investigation (FBI), local and state authorities, and four hundred United States Navy sailors. The three men's bodies were not discovered until two months later, when the team received a tip. During the investigation it emerged that members of the local White Knights of the Ku Klux Klan, the Neshoba County Sheriff's Office, and the Philadelphia Police Department were involved in the incident.

=== Burrage's dam ===
Burrage was developing a cattle farm on a tract of land known as the Old Jolly Farm on Highway 21 a few miles southwest of Philadelphia. Tucker was a part-time truck driver for Burrage and owned two Caterpillar bulldozers. Burrage contracted Tucker to clear an area on his farm for a pond and to build an earthen dam.

Sometime before the murders, Burrage remarked about the "invasion" of Civil Rights workers coming to Mississippi. Burrage allegedly proclaimed that, "Hell, I've got a dam that'll hold a hundred of them."

=== Arrest and trial ===
After being indicted by federal grand jury in December 1964, Tucker was placed under arrest by the Federal Bureau of Investigation for violation of Title 18, Section 241, United States Code.

Tucker was officially arrested at 9:02 a.m., December 4, 1964, and transported to the Naval Auxiliary Air Station, Meridian, Mississippi where he was taken to the Bachelor Officers Quarters on the base where he was interviewed, fingerprinted and photographed. Tucker was ultimately acquitted in 1967.

== Death ==
Tucker died at his home in Neshoba County, Mississippi.

== See also ==
- Samuel Bowers
- Olen Lovell Burrage
- Edgar Ray Killen
- Cecil Price
- Lawrence A. Rainey
- Alton Wayne Roberts
- Jimmy Snowden
- Civil Rights Movement
- United States v. Price
