= United States v. Price =

- Supreme Court of the United States

Argued November 9, 1965 Decided March 28, 1966
- Full case name: United States v. Cecil Price, et al.
- Citations: 383 U.S. 787 (more) 86 S. Ct. 1152; 16 L. Ed. 2d 267

Case history
- Prior: Indictments dismissed by District Court (reversed and remanded)
- Subsequent: 7 of the 18 defendants convicted on remand

Holding
- The 14th amendment grants the United States authority to indict state actors. Additionally, all private citizens who assist state actors during alleged crimes became de-facto state actors themselves and as a result, find themselves in the exact same legal jeopardy as the de jure state actors they assisted. District court reversed.

Court membership
- Chief Justice Earl Warren Associate Justices Hugo Black · William O. Douglas; Tom C. Clark · John M. Harlan II; William J. Brennan Jr. · Potter Stewart; Byron White · Abe Fortas

Case opinions
- Majority: Fortas, joined by unanimous
- Concurrence: Black

United States v. Cecil Price, et al., also known as the Mississippi Burning trial or Mississippi Burning case, was a criminal trial where the United States charged a group of 18 men with conspiring in a Ku Klux Klan plot to murder three young civil rights workers (Michael Schwerner, James Chaney, and Andrew Goodman) in Philadelphia, Mississippi, on June 21, 1964, during Freedom Summer. The trial, conducted in Meridian, Mississippi, with US District Court Judge William Harold Cox presiding, resulted in convictions of 7 of the 18 defendants. Another defendant, James Edward Jordan, pleaded guilty and testified for the prosecution.

== Initial proceedings ==
Indictments were originally presented against 18 defendants, three of whom were officials of the Mississippi government, for conspiracy to deprive three individuals of their rights under the Fourteenth Amendment of the Constitution. The District Court initially dismissed the indictments, but the dismissal was unanimously reversed by the Supreme Court upon appeal. The trial then proceeded. The Supreme Court declared that the victims had been denied due process under the terms of the Civil Rights Act of 1866. That law was still in effect and it made it a federal crime for state officials to deny a person any of the rights and privileges guaranteed by the U.S. Constitution because of race. The Court further stipulated that actions by any private citizen who participated with the state official also came under the scope of the act.

== Verdict ==
The case was decided in 1966.

Guilty verdicts were returned against:

- Cecil Price, the chief deputy sheriff of Neshoba County, Mississippi
- Sam H. Bowers Jr., of Laurel, the Imperial Wizard of the White Knights of the Ku Klux Klan
- Horace Doyle Barnette, a one-time Meridian salesman
- Jimmy Arledge, a Meridian truck driver
- Billy Wayne Posey, a Williamsville service station operator
- Jimmy Snowden, a Meridian laundry truck driver
- Alton W. Roberts, a Meridian salesman who shot two of the three civil rights workers

Not guilty verdicts were returned for:

- Lawrence A. Rainey, the sheriff of Neshoba County
- Bernard L. Akin, a Meridian housetrailer dealer
- Travis M. Barnette, a Meridian mechanic and half-brother of Horace Doyle Barnette
- James T. Harris, a Meridian truck driver
- Frank J. Herndon, the operator of a Meridian drive-in restaurant
- Olen Lovell Burrage, the owner of the farm on which the bodies of Schwerner, Chaney, and Goodman were buried
- Herman Tucker, the builder of the dam in which the bodies were found
- Richard A. Willis, a one-time Philadelphia policeman

No verdict was reached for:

- Ethel Glen Barnett, the Democratic nominee for Neshoba County sheriff
- Jerry McGrew Sharpe, a pulpwood hauler
- Edgar Ray Killen, a fundamentalist minister and sawmill operator. In the case of Killen, the jury deadlocked after a lone juror stated she "could never convict a preacher". The case against Killen was reopened in 1999, and on June 21, 2005, he was found guilty of three counts in state court of manslaughter for orchestrating the killings. Killen was sentenced to 60 years in prison, and died in prison in 2018.

== Jury ==
An all-white, mostly working-class jury consisting of five men and seven women heard the case. The jurors were:

- Langdon Smith Anderson (foreman), a Lumberton oil exploration operator and member of the State Agricultural and Industrial Board
- Mrs. S.M. Green, a Hattiesburg housewife
- Mrs. Lessie Lowery, a Hiwannee grocery store owner
- Howard O. Winborn, a Petal pipefitter
- Harmon W. Raspberry, a Stonewall textile worker
- Mrs. Gussie B. Staton, a Union housewife
- Jessie P. Hollingsworth, a Moss Point electrician
- Mrs. James C. Heflin, a Lake production worker
- Mrs. Nell B. Dedeaux, a Lumberton housewife
- Willie V. Arneson, a Meridian secretary
- Edsell Z. Parks, a Brandon clerk
- Adelaide H. Comer, a cook at an Ocean Springs school cafeteria

== Penalties ==
The penalties exacted by the federal penal system were,

- for Price: sentenced to six years in prison, and served four years
- for Bowers: sentenced to ten years in prison, and served six years
- for Barnette: sentenced to three years in prison
- for Arledge: sentenced to three years in prison
- for Posey: sentenced to six years in prison
- for Snowden: sentenced to three years in prison, and served two years
- for Roberts: sentenced to ten years in prison, and served six years

== Film adaptation ==
In 1988, the film Mississippi Burning was loosely based on the trial and the events surrounding the murder. It starred Gene Hackman and Willem Dafoe as two FBI agents who travel to Mississippi to uncover the events surrounding the disappearance of three civil rights workers.

Several of the fictitious characters in the movie were based on real-life defendants in the trial. Deputy Sheriff Clinton Pell (played by Brad Dourif) was based on Cecil Ray Price, Sheriff Ray Stuckey (played by Gailard Sartain) was based on Sheriff Lawrence Rainey, and Frank Bailey (played by Michael Rooker) was based on Alton W. Roberts. The film also starred R. Lee Ermey and Frances McDormand.

== See also ==
- Civil Rights Movement
- List of United States Supreme Court cases, volume 383
- United States v. Shipp, 1906 federal criminal case
