= Olen Burrage =

American farmer and KKK member (1930–2013)

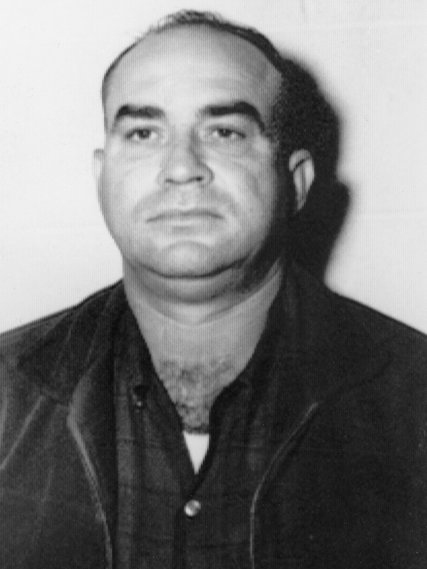
- Mug shot of Burrage, 1964
- Born: Olen Lavelle Burrage; March 16, 1930; Neshoba County, Mississippi, U.S.
- Died: March 15, 2013 (aged 82); Meridian, Mississippi, U.S.
- Occupations: Businessman, farmer
- Spouse: Ruth Audine Clark
- Children: 4
- Relatives: Jenifer Branning (granddaughter)
- Status: Acquitted
- Criminal charges: Conspiring to injure, oppress, threaten, and intimidate.

Olen Lavelle Burrage (March 16, 1930 – March 15, 2013) was an American farmer and businessman who was tried and acquitted of the June 1964 murders of three civil rights workers. Burrage owned the farm where the bodies of James Chaney, Andrew Goodman, and Michael Schwerner were found buried in an earthen dam.

== Biography ==
Burrage was born in Neshoba County, Mississippi, on March 16, 1930, to Leon Lavelle Burrage and Sudie Elizabeth Burrage. He served in the United States Marine Corps as a truck mechanic during the 1950s. He was honorably discharged and later started Burrage Trucking, Inc. In 1956 Burrage bought a farm in Neshoba County. By 1964 Burrage owned 250 acres having acquired several additional tracts of land where he grew corn and raised cattle. Burrage sold his trucking business in 1990 and dabbled in cattle farming and timberland resources for the remainder of his life. He was a Shriner, Mason, and a deacon at a Baptist church.

Burrage lived most of his life in Mississippi except when he briefly lived in Houston, Texas, working as a bus driver.

=== Murders of Chaney, Goodman, and Schwerner ===
The bodies of civil rights workers Chaney, Goodman and Schwerner were found August 4, 1964, buried in an earthen dam that Burrage was building on his land. Two of the bulldozer operators who constructed the dam maintained that they worked on it until late in the afternoon of June 21, the day the civil rights workers disappeared.

On the afternoon of June 21, 1964, James Chaney, Andrew Goodman, and Michael Schwerner arrived at Longdale, in Neshoba County, Mississippi, to speak with members of a Black church there that had been burned down. They left Longdale around 3 p.m. They were to be in Meridian by 4 p.m. that day. The fastest route to Meridian was through Philadelphia. At the fork of Beacon and Main Street in that city, one of their station wagon's tires went flat. It is possible that a shot was fired at the tire; the home of Neshoba County Sheriff Lawrence Rainey was near the fork. Deputy Cecil Price soon arrived and escorted the three to the county jail. Price released the trio as soon as the longest day of the year became night, which was about 10 p.m. The three were last seen driving south along Highway 19 toward Meridian.

The disappearance of the three men was initially investigated as a missing persons case. The civil rights workers' burnt-out car was found near a swamp three days after their disappearance. An extensive search of the area was conducted by the Federal Bureau of Investigation (FBI), local and state authorities, and four hundred United States Navy sailors. The three men's bodies were not discovered until two months later, when the team received a tip that led them to Burrage's farm. During the investigation it emerged that members of the local White Knights of the Ku Klux Klan, the Neshoba County Sheriff's Office, and the Philadelphia Police Department were involved in the incident.

=== Burrage's dam ===
In 1964 Burrage was developing a cattle farm on a tract of land he had purchased known as the Old Jolly Farm on Highway 21 a few miles southwest of Philadelphia. Burrage hired Herman Tucker to build a dam to create a pond for watering livestock. Tucker was a part-time truck driver for Burrage, and owned two Caterpillar bulldozers.

Sometime before the murders, Burrage remarked about the "invasion" of civil rights workers coming to Mississippi. Burrage allegedly proclaimed that, "Hell, I've got a dam that'll hold a hundred of them."

=== Arrest and trial ===
After being indicted by a federal grand jury in December 1964, Burrage was placed under arrest by the Federal Bureau of Investigation for violation of Title 18, Section 241, United States Code: "conspiracy against rights".

He was officially arrested at 8:27 a.m., December 4, 1964, and transported to the Naval Auxiliary Air Station, Meridian, Mississippi, where he was taken to the bachelor officers quarters, where he was photographed and fingerprinted.

In a 1964 confession, Ku Klux Klansman turned FBI informant Horace Barnette had told investigators that he met Burrage after the bodies were buried in the dam. An FBI agent read his confession to the jury during the trial.

“Burrage got a glass gallon jug and filled it with gasoline to be used to burn the 1963 Ford car owned by the three civil rights workers,” Barnette said. “Burrage took one of the diesel trucks from under a trailer and said, `I will use this to pick you up, no one will suspect a truck on the road this time at night.’ It was then about 1 to 1:30 in the morning.”

At trial, Burrage who did not live on the farm where the bodies were found, insisted that he knew nothing about the killings. Family members and friends corroborated his alibi that he was at home and at church on the night of the murders, and he was acquitted in 1967.

== Death ==
Burrage died in Anderson Regional Medical Center in Meridian on March 15, 2013, the day before his 83rd birthday. The local newspaper, The Neshoba Democrat, did not mention Burrage's implication in the murders in his obituary.

== See also ==
- Samuel Bowers
- Edgar Ray Killen
- Cecil Price
- Lawrence A. Rainey
- Alton Wayne Roberts
- Jimmy Snowden
- Herman Tucker
- Civil rights movement
- United States v. Price
- Jenifer Branning
