= Alton Wayne Roberts =

American murderer and white supremacist (1938–1999)

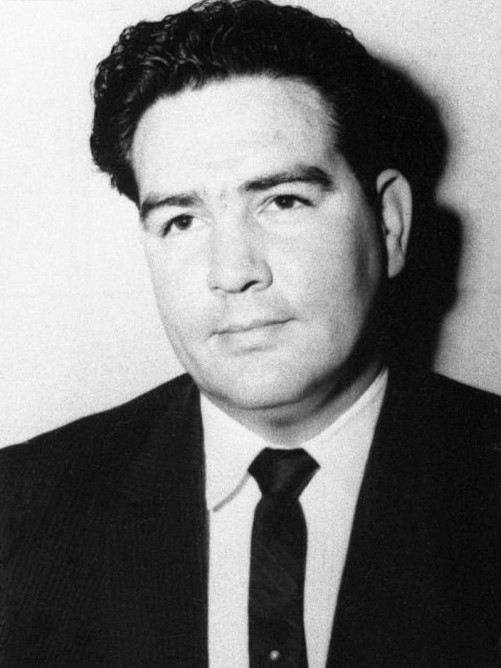
- Mug shot of Roberts, 1964
- Born: April 6, 1938; Meridian, Mississippi, U.S.
- Died: September 11, 1999 (aged 61); Meridian, Mississippi, U.S.
- Resting place: Quitman, Mississippi, U.S.
- Occupations: Bar owner, salesman, truck driver
- Spouse: Linda Walker
- Status: Deceased
- Motive: White supremacy
- Conviction: Conspiracy to deprive rights
- Penalty: 10 years imprisonment

Details
- Victims: James Chaney, 21; Andrew Goodman, 20; Michael Schwerner, 24
- Country: United States
- State: Mississippi

Alton Wayne Roberts (April 6, 1938 – September 11, 1999) was an American murderer and white supremacist. Roberts, a member of the White Knights of the Ku Klux Klan, was convicted for his role in the 1964 Freedom Summer murders where it’s suspected he fatally shot two of the victims, Congress of Racial Equality civil rights activists Michael Schwerner and Andrew Goodman. Roberts also may have shot the third activist, James Chaney, but some debate that it was another accomplice, James Jordan, who had killed him. Jordan had identified Roberts as Chaney's killer. In 1967, he was charged and convicted of depriving the slain activists of their civil rights.

== Early life ==
Alton Wayne Roberts, who went by Wayne for most of his life, was born and raised in Meridian, Mississippi. He was the second youngest child of Clyde Cuthell Roberts and Eula Juanita Quinnelly and grew up with three brothers, Lee, Lloyd, and Raymond. Roberts played football during high school.

Roberts, then 26 years old, owned a bar and was working as a window salesman and a mobile home salesman, at the time of the murders. He had previously served in the U.S. Marine Corps, from which he was dishonorably discharged for drunkenness and absence without leave. He was married to Linda Walker.

== Freedom Summer murders ==
On the afternoon of June 21, 1964, Chaney, Goodman, and Schwerner arrived at Longdale to inspect a burned-out black church in Neshoba County, which had been attacked and vandalized by the local chapter of the KKK. They left Longdale around 3 p.m. They were to be in Meridian by 4 p.m. that day. The fastest route to Meridian was through Philadelphia. At the fork of Beacon & Main Street, their station wagon sustained a flat tire. It is possible that a shot was fired at the station wagon's tire. Sheriff Lawrence A. Rainey's home was near the Beacon and Main Street fork. Deputy Cecil Price soon arrived and escorted them to the county jail. Price released the trio as soon as the longest day of the year became night, about 10 p.m. The three were last seen heading south in their Ford station wagon along Highway 19 toward Meridian.

Two Mississippi Highway Patrol men waited at Pilgrim's Gas Station, not far from Philadelphia's city limits. The trio was likely deterred from using a phone at the station, so they drove past it and continued toward Meridian.

=== Lynch mob ===
The lynch mob, in Horace D. Barnette's and Billy W. Posey's cars, was drinking while arguing about who would kill the three men. Eventually, Philadelphia Police Officer Other N. Burkes drove up to Barnette's car and told the mob that "they're going on 19 toward Meridian. Follow them!" After a quick rendezvous with Philadelphia Police Officer Richard Willis, Price was in pursuit of the three civil rights workers. Posey's Chevrolet carried Jerry M. Sharpe, Jimmy L. Townsend, and Alton W. Roberts. Horace Barnette had a two-toned blue Ford Fairlane sedan. In Horace's car were James Jordan, Jimmy K. Arledge, Jimmy Snowden, Roberts, and Posey. Posey's car had carburetor problems and broke down on the side of the road. Sharpe and Townsend were ordered to stay with the car and get it running again. Price eventually caught the CORE station wagon heading west toward Union, Mississippi, on state highway 492.

Soon, the three civil rights workers would be escorted north on Highway 19 to secluded Rock Cut Road, where they would be executed at the hands of Roberts and Jordan.

When they arrived, Roberts reportedly pulled Schwerner out of the car, pointing a gun at his chest. "Are you that nigger lover?" Roberts asked, his left hand on Schwerner's shoulder. "Sir, I know just how you feel," Schwerner replied. Roberts then shot him in the heart and then grabbed Goodman, shooting him in the chest near his right shoulder. Chaney ran, but Roberts, along with other Klansmen, shot him dead before he could run any farther. Roberts fired into Chaney's lower back and his head. Prosecutors said that Roberts fired two of the three bullets found in Chaney's body. After the murders, James Jordan was accused of saying, "Well, you didn't leave me nothing but a nigger, but at least I killed me a nigger."

== Conviction ==
On December 4, 1964, The Federal Bureau of Investigation arrested several men for engineering a conspiracy to injure, oppress, threaten, and intimidate Chaney, Goodman, and Schwerner. Roberts was one of many rounded up that day.

Roberts was indicted on February 28, 1967. He went to federal trial in Meridian on October 7 of that same year; 13 days later, he was convicted. At the sentencing hearing on December 29, 1967, Judge William Harold Cox sentenced Roberts to 10 years in federal prison. Roberts served no more than six years in McNeil Island Corrections Center, and was free on appeal bond.

=== Assault of Laurens Pierce ===
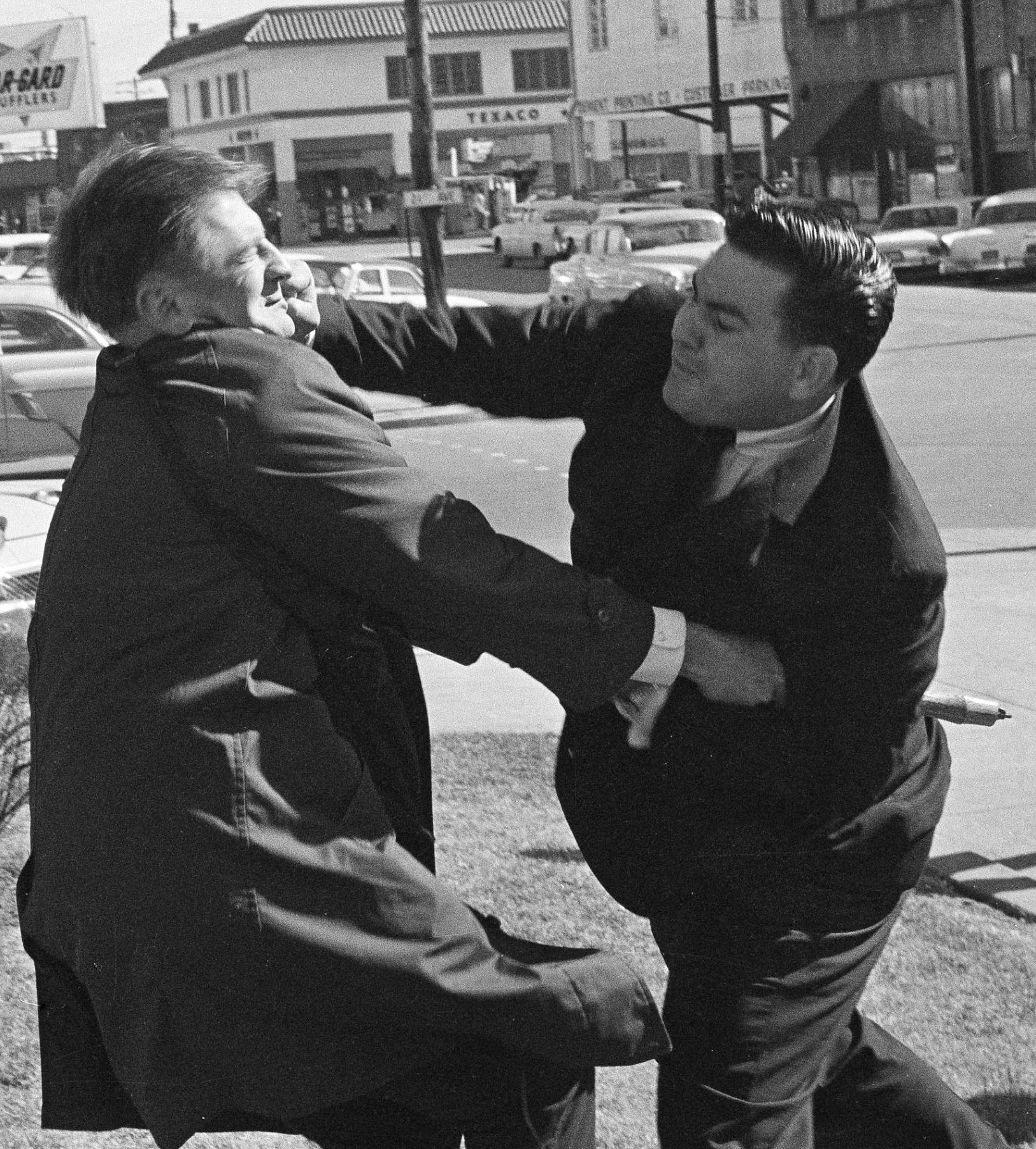
Thornell's photo of Roberts punching Pierce

Roberts gained national recognition on January 27, 1965, for getting into a fight with CBS cameraman Laurens Pierce outside the federal courthouse in Meridian where he was on trial at the time. Roberts had grabbed Pierce's camera as he was taking pictures of him, which escalated when Roberts punched Pierce during the struggle. Jack Thornell took photos of Roberts beating up the reporter, with the incident becoming widely circulated in the U.S. press the next day. In 1968, Roberts filed a diversity suit against Pierce, alleging that he had been the one to initiate the altercation, which ultimately did not go to court.

== Aftermath ==
According to People, Roberts was running an "after-hours bar" located in Meridian, Mississippi in 1989.

He died of heart failure on September 11, 1999.

== See also ==
- Samuel Bowers
- Olen Lovell Burrage
- Edgar Ray Killen
- Cecil Price
- Lawrence A. Rainey
- Jimmy Snowden
- Herman Tucker
- Civil Rights Movement
- United States v. Price
