= Cecil Price =

American deputy sheriff and klansman (1938–2001)

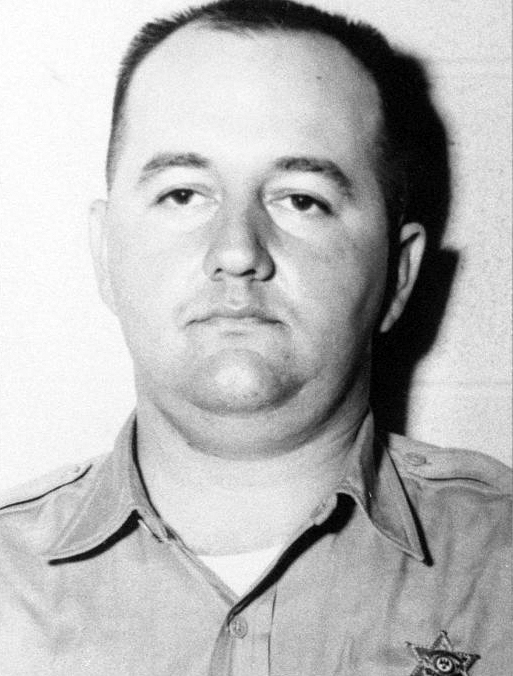
- Mug shot of Price, 1964
- Born: Cecil Ray Price; April 15, 1938; Flora, Mississippi, U.S.
- Died: May 6, 2001 (aged 63); Jackson, Mississippi, U.S.
- Occupations: Deputy sheriff; surveyor; truck driver; watchmaker
- Spouse: Conner Price
- Children: Cecil Price Jr.
- Status: Deceased
- Motive: White supremacy
- Conviction: Conspiracy to deprive rights
- Penalty: 6 years imprisonment

Details
- Victims: James Chaney, 21; Andrew Goodman, 20; Michael Schwerner, 24

Cecil Ray Price (April 15, 1938 – May 6, 2001) was an American deputy sheriff and member of the White Knights of the Ku Klux Klan. He was a participant in the murders of Chaney, Goodman, and Schwerner in 1964.

Although he was never charged with the murders, Price was convicted in October 1967 of violating the civil rights of the three victims. He was sentenced to a six-year prison term and served four and a half years at the Sandstone Federal Penitentiary in Minnesota. Following his release from prison, he returned to Philadelphia, Mississippi, and worked various jobs. Cecil Price died following a fall from a piece of equipment at his job on May 6, 2001.

== Early life ==
Cecil Ray Price was born in Flora, Mississippi, on April 15, 1938. He graduated from Flora High School in 1956.

== Murders ==
On the afternoon of June 21, 1964, Price stopped a station wagon on Mississippi Highway 19 for allegedly speeding inside the Philadelphia city limits. Inside the station wagon were three civil rights workers James Chaney, who was driving, Andrew Goodman and Michael Schwerner. Price arrested the three workers, allegedly on suspicion of having been involved in a church arson, and locked them in the county jail.

During this time, he denied their requests for a phone call and instructed that anyone who called looking for them should be told that the three men were not there. Some time that same afternoon, Price reportedly met with fellow Klansmen to work out the details of the planned evening release and executions.

Price released the three following Chaney's payment of the speeding fine and followed them in his patrol car. At 10:25, Price sped to catch up with the station wagon before it crossed the border into the relative safety of Lauderdale County.

Price ordered the three out of their car and into his. He then drove them to a deserted area on Rock Cut Road while being followed by two cars filled with other Klansmen. He then turned them over to fellow Klansmen who committed the beating of Chaney and subsequent murder of the three men. Price returned to Philadelphia and resumed his duties as deputy while the bodies were being buried in an earthen dam that was under construction.

Following a lead, the bodies of the three missing men were located at the dam site on August 4, 1964. Price was invited by FBI Inspector Joseph Sullivan to assist in the recovery efforts of the bodies. Sullivan suspected Price of being involved and wished to observe his reactions. FBI agent John Proctor stated that "Price picked up a shovel and dug right in, and gave no indication whatsoever that any of it bothered him."

Price helped escort the three bodies to the University of Mississippi Medical Center in Jackson, where the autopsies were performed.

== Trial ==
Following the discovery of the bodies, the state of Mississippi refused to bring murder charges against anyone. In January 1965, however, Price and seventeen others were indicted with conspiring in a Ku Klux Klan plot to murder three young civil rights workers. The indictments were dismissed by District Court, but the decision was later reversed on appeal and the charges reinstated.

The trial of Price and the other defendants began on October 7, 1967, as United States v. Cecil Price, et al. During this time, Price declared himself a candidate for sheriff and he lost the election to Hop Barnette, one of his co-defendants. On October 21, 1967, Price was found guilty at trial of conspiracy and sentenced by Judge Cox to a six-year prison term. He served four and a half years at the Sandstone Federal Penitentiary in Minnesota.

== Aftermath ==
Following his release in 1974, Price returned to Philadelphia where he worked a variety of jobs. He was employed at times as a surveyor, as a truck driver for an oil company, and as a watchmaker in a jewelry shop. He was never charged with the murders of the three men.

Later in life, Price refused to speak publicly about the events of 1964 to 1967. During an interview for The New York Times Magazine in 1977, he stated that "he enjoyed watching the television show Roots" and in regards to racial integration said that "[w]e've got to accept this is the way things are going to be and that's it." Price also told an African American pastor that he had repented of his previous actions. He helped a black man, Marcus Dupree, a friend of his son Cecil Jr., get a commercial driver's license, allowing Dupree to establish a career after his retirement from the National Football League.

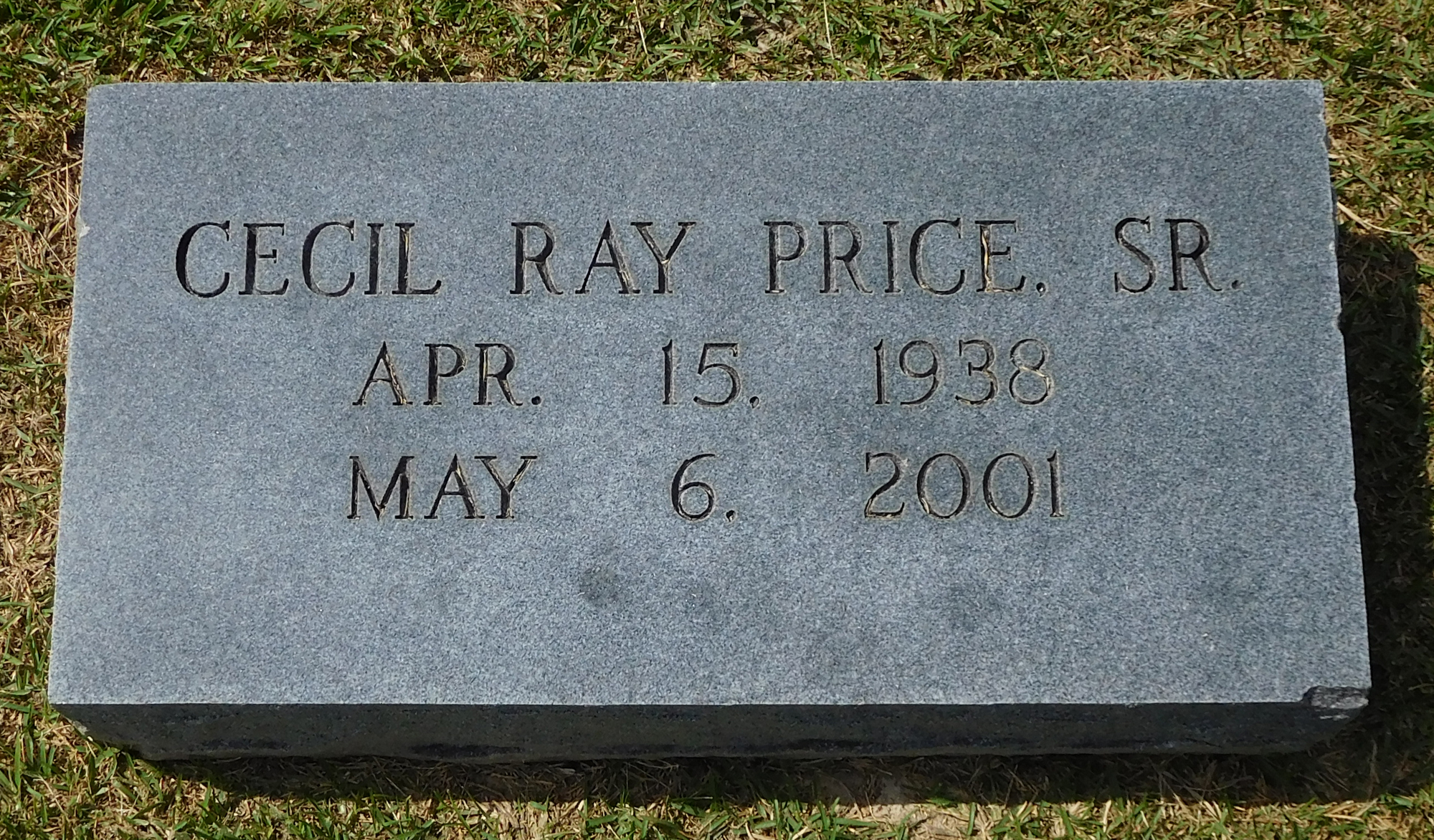
Gravemaker of Price

Price died on May 6, 2001, three days after falling from a lift in an equipment rental store where he was working in Philadelphia, Mississippi. He died in the University of Mississippi Medical Center, the same hospital in Jackson where, thirty-seven years earlier, he had helped transport the bodies of the three slain civil rights workers for autopsies. At the time of Price's death, Mississippi attorney general Mike Moore and Neshoba County prosecutor Ken Turner were considering bringing state murder charges against some of the surviving defendants in the 1967 federal trial. Attorney General Moore saw Price's death as harmful to the ongoing investigation: "If he had been a defendant, he would have been a principal defendant. If he had been a witness, he would have been our best witness. Either way, his death is a tragic blow to our case."

== Portrayals in film and television ==
The first fictionalized version of Cecil Price appeared in the 1975 CBS 2-part TV drama, Attack on Terror: The FBI vs. the Ku Klux Klan. In this version, Ned Beatty portrayed Sayville Deputy Ollie Thompson.

In the 1988 movie Mississippi Burning, the character of Deputy Clinton Pell is based on Price. The Pell character was portrayed by Brad Dourif. Mrs. Pell, Clinton's wife, was based on Conner Price, Cecil's wife. She was played by Frances McDormand.

In the 1990 TV movie Murder in Mississippi, Deputy Winter – a fictionalized version of Cecil Price – was portrayed by Royce D. Applegate.

In HBO's 2016 movie All the Way, Cecil Price was portrayed by Colby Sullivan.

Archival footage of Price appears in the 30 for 30 documentary The Best that Never Was, which chronicles the life of National Football League player Marcus Dupree. The film begins with a brief mention of Price's involvement in the 1964 murders, then explains Price's role in assisting Dupree after his retirement from the NFL.

== See also ==
- Samuel Bowers
- Olen Lovell Burrage
- Edgar Ray Killen
- Lawrence A. Rainey
- Alton Wayne Roberts
- Jimmy Snowden
- Herman Tucker
- Civil Rights Movement
