= Samuel Bowers =

American white supremacist leader (1924–2006)

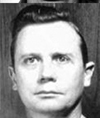

1st Grand Wizard of the White Knights of the Ku Klux Klan
- In office February 15, 1964 – 1989
- Preceded by: Position established
- Succeeded by: Johnny Lee Clary

Personal details
- Born: Samuel Holloway Bowers Jr. August 25, 1924 New Orleans, Louisiana, U.S.
- Died: November 5, 2006 (aged 82) Mississippi State Penitentiary, Sunflower County, Mississippi, U.S.
- Known for: Founding the White Knights of the Ku Klux Klan

Samuel Holloway Bowers Jr. (August 6, 1924 – November 5, 2006) was an American white supremacist who co-founded the White Knights of the Ku Klux Klan and became its first Imperial Wizard. Previously, he was a Grand dragon of the Mississippi Original Knights of the Ku Klux Klan, appointed to his position by Imperial Wizard Roy Davis. Bowers was responsible for instigating and planning the 1964 murders of James Chaney, Andrew Goodman, and Michael Schwerner by members of his Klan chapter near Philadelphia, Mississippi, for which he served six years in federal prison; and the 1966 murder of Vernon Dahmer in Hattiesburg, for which he was sentenced to life in prison, 32 years after the crime. He also was accused of being involved in the 1967–1968 bombings of Jewish targets in the cities of Jackson and Meridian (according to one of the people convicted of some of the bombings, Thomas A. Tarrants III). He died in prison at the age of 82.

== Early life ==
Bowers was born on August 25, 1924, in New Orleans, Louisiana, to Samuel Bowers Sr., a salesman, and his wife Evangeline Bowers (née Peyton), daughter of a well-to-do planter. He had deep roots in the southern Mississippi–New Orleans area on both sides of his family. His maternal grandfather had a plantation while his father's father, Eaton J. Bowers, was a four-term Congressman from Mississippi's Gulf Coast. Representative Bowers was an explicitly virulent opponent of equality for African Americans. In a speech to the U.S. House of Representatives in 1904, during his freshman term, he said:

Let me say to the gentleman from Massachusetts that it is evident that we have at least two theories as to how the negro should be dealt with. One may be termed his idea of the development by higher education, social equality, and the like, while the other might be dominated [sic] the Southern idea of the absolute segregation of the two races, the fitting the negro for that sphere and station which, based upon an experience born of more than a century's knowledge of him as a slave and nearly forty years' experience with him as a freedman, we believe he can acceptably and worthily fill, with absolute denial of social intercourse and with every restriction on his participation in political affairs and government that is permissible under the Federal Constitution … The restriction of suffrage was the wisest statesmanship ever exhibited in that proud Commonwealth … We have disfranchised not only the ignorant and vicious black but the ignorant and vicious white as well …

Sam Bowers Jr. attended high school in Jackson, Mississippi. While a high school student, Bowers worked part-time at Jackson's newly established Mississippi School Book Depository. He was among the first group of staff members hired after the state legislature approved of and passed a free textbook program championed by Governor Paul B. Johnson Sr. During World War II, he served in the United States Navy. Eventually, Bowers settled in Laurel, Mississippi. He started his own small business, Sambo Amusement Company, variously reported to be a pinball machine business and a vending machine business.

== White Knights of the Ku Klux Klan ==
Bowers, along with many other southern whites during the Cold War, was antagonistic toward the civil rights movement, believing that it was a movement which was led by the far left and organized by the Communist Party, and he began to express racist political views in the late 1950s. Bowers came to believe that the Soviet Union was a front for Jewish elites which were seeking to overthrow Christianity as the dominant religion of Western society, that Fidel Castro's government in Cuba was recruiting and providing military training to blacks as part of a plot to invade the Gulf Coast, and that the U.S. federal government would use the invasion as a pretext to federalize the National Guard and deport all whites from his home state of Mississippi.

Bowers was appointed Grand Dragon of Mississippi by Imperial Wizard Roy Davis in 1959 or 1960. Davis resigned in 1964, just after Congress launched an investigation into the KKK, and the Original Knights began to fragment. Bowers believed that the original Ku Klux Klan was too passive. On February 15, 1964, at a meeting in Brookhaven, Mississippi, he convinced about 200 members of the original Knights to defect and join his Klan, which would be named the White Knights of the Ku Klux Klan. He became the group's first fraternal "Imperial Wizard," writing a "Klan Konstitution" for the "Sovereign Realm of Mississippi", which he would govern with the assistance of a body that he would name the "Klongress." Bowers adopted a code of secrecy under which nobody outside the Klan knew the Imperial Wizard's identity.

== Philosophy of the White Knights ==
In an "Imperial Executive Order", which was issued at a Klan meeting on June 7, 1964, and recorded by the FBI, Bowers wrote:

This summer, within a very few days, the enemy will launch his final push for victory here in Mississippi. This offensive will consist of two basic salients […]

One. Massive street demonstrations by blacks used by communists […] designed to provoke whites into counterdemonstrations and open, pitched street battles […] to provide an excuse for:

Two. A decree from subversive authorities in charge of the national government [...] declaring martial law […]

When the first waves of blacks hit our streets this summer, we must avoid open daylight conflict with them […] we must reveal their leaders as the immoral hypocrites they are.

Weaving religion into the mix, he further declared

As Christians we are disposed to kindness, generosity, affection, and humility in our dealings with others. As militants, we are disposed to use physical force against our enemies. How can we reconcile these two apparently contradictory philosophies? The answer, of course, is to purge malice, bitterness, and vengeance from our hearts.

== Violent campaign ==
In 1964, community activists from Congress of Racial Equality and Students for a Democratic Society launched Freedom Summer. Later that year, three of these activists—James Chaney, Michael Schwerner, and Andrew Goodman—were murdered. Sam Bowers was convicted in 1967 for his role in the Chaney–Schwerner–Goodman killings and served his sentence at McNeil Island Federal Prison in Washington. He was released in 1976 and then worked as a Sunday School teacher.

Two other men, Charles Eddie Moore and Henry Hezekiah Dee, were murdered at that time because they were suspected of being civil rights activists. However, it was later determined that Bowers was not involved in their deaths. Klansman and former police officer James Ford Seale was arrested for this crime in 2007. Charles Marcus Edwards also participated in the abduction and beating and testified that he was the one who had identified Dee as a target because "he fit the profile of a Black Panther..." Seale and Edwards were convicted because journalists, particularly Canadian filmmaker David Ridgen in his award-winning CBC documentary Mississippi Cold Case, investigated the case and discovered incriminating evidence.

In January 1966, Bowers, along with several other members of the White Knights of the KKK, was subpoenaed by the House Un-American Activities Committee to testify about Klan activities. Although Byron De La Beckwith gave his name when asked by the committee (but would answer no other substantive questions), other witnesses, such as Bowers, invoked the Fifth Amendment even in response to that question.

In 1966, alleged members of the White Knights firebombed the house of Vernon Dahmer, a civil rights activist who was working to register African Americans for the vote. Dahmer died of burn injuries, which covered 40% of his body, and damage to his lungs, which were seared while rescuing his family from the fire.

According to later testimony by ex-White Knights member T. Webber Rogers, Bowers gave the direct order to have Dahmer killed "in any way possible." After four previous trials ended in deadlock (a 1968 jury split 11 to 1 in favor of guilty, and in 1969 a jury split 10–2 in favor of conviction), Bowers was convicted of the murder in August 1998 and sentenced to life in prison.

In 1967, White Knights were alleged to have begun a campaign against Jewish targets in Mississippi. Beth Israel Congregation in Jackson and Congregation Beth Israel in Meridian were bombed. Also, the home of Jackson's Rabbi Perry Nussbaum was attacked. The actual perpetrators of these crimes were suspects Thomas A. Tarrants III and Kathy Ainsworth.

The FBI became involved in the case and, with threatening accusations against local law enforcement, began tracking down potential bombers.

A breakthrough in the case came when two Klan brothers, Alton Wayne Roberts and Raymond Roberts, met with the FBI and the police in exchange for reward money and immunity. Alton Wayne Roberts had previously been sentenced to 10 years in prison for violating the civil rights of Chaney, Schwerner, and Goodman. He agreed to cooperate to receive a reduced sentence. A joint FBI and local police operation ambushed Tarrants and Ainsworth. Ainsworth was killed, and Tarrants was severely wounded.

== Conviction and death ==
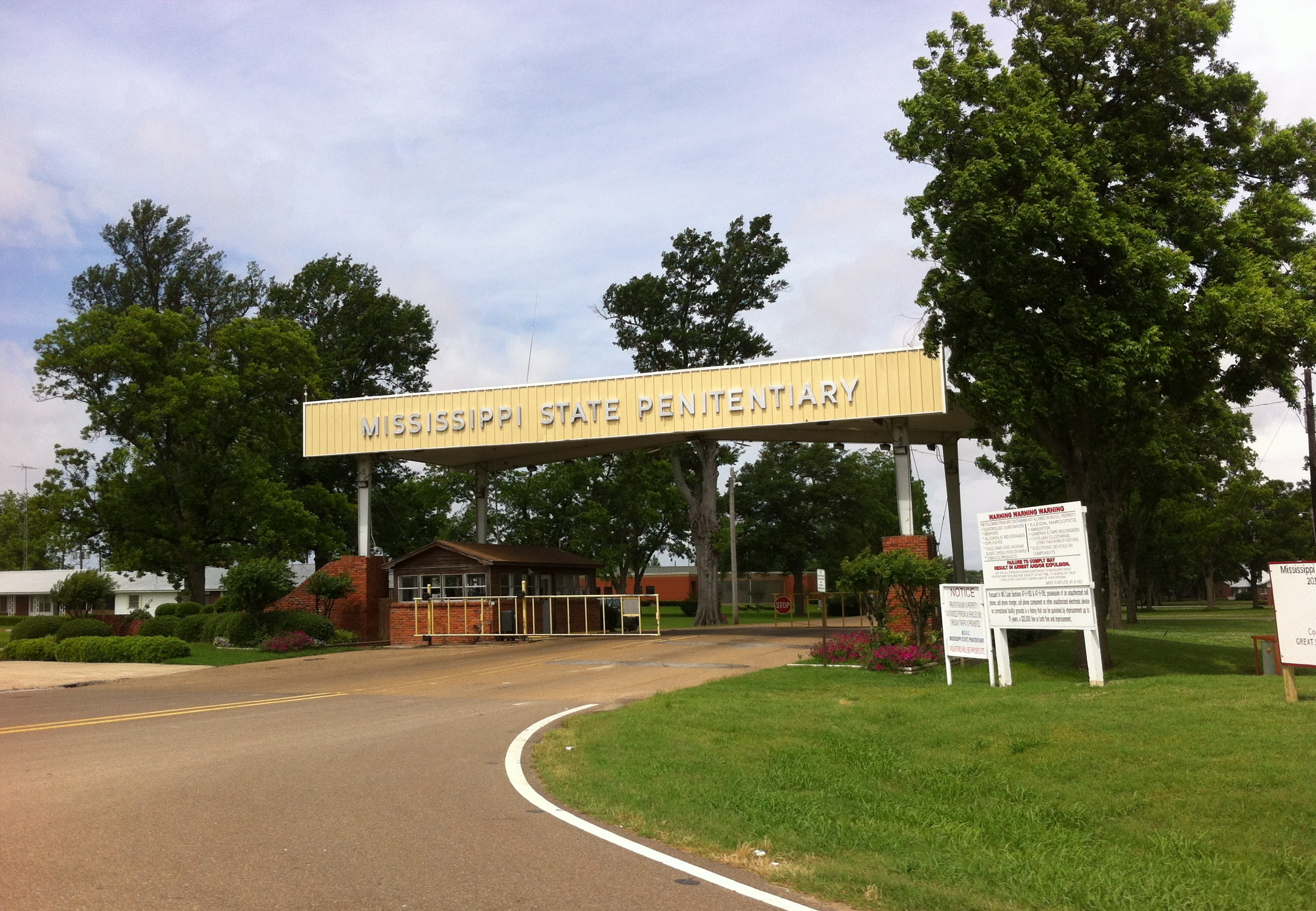
Bowers was incarcerated and died at the Mississippi State Penitentiary

Convicted in August 1998 of ordering the assassination of civil rights leader Vernon Dahmer Sr., Bowers served a life sentence. According to the commissioner of the Mississippi Department of Corrections (MDOC), only one person visited Bowers during his incarceration. The visitor claimed to be Bowers' brother, who listed a false address and fictitious Mississippi town as his residence. Bowers died in the Mississippi State Penitentiary (Parchman) Hospital of cardiopulmonary arrest on Sunday, November 5, 2006, aged 82.

After Bowers died, an out-of-state relative came forward to claim his body. He never married.

== See also ==
- Olen Lovell Burrage
- Edgar Ray Killen
- Cecil Price
- Lawrence A. Rainey
- Alton Wayne Roberts
- Jimmy Snowden
- Herman Tucker
- Civil rights movement
- United States v. Price
