= Lawrence Rainey =

American sheriff and klansman (1923–2002)

Lawrence A. Rainey
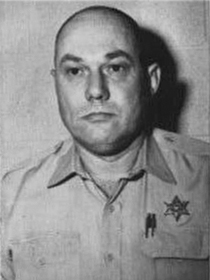
- Rainey's mugshot, late 1964
- Born: March 2, 1923; Neshoba County, Mississippi, U.S.
- Died: November 8, 2002 (aged 79); Meridian, Mississippi, U.S.
- Occupation: Sheriff
- Spouses: Gladys Tolbert; Juanita Rainey
- Children: 2
- Motive: White supremacy
- Convictions: None, Not Guilty
- Criminal charges: Conspiring to injure, oppress, threaten, and intimidate.

Lawrence Andrew Rainey Sr. (March 2, 1923 – November 8, 2002) was an American police officer and white supremacist who served as Sheriff of Neshoba County, Mississippi, from 1963 to 1968. He gained notoriety for his alleged involvement in the June 1964 murders of civil rights activists James Chaney, Andrew Goodman, and Michael Schwerner. He was accused of aiding and abetting members of the Ku Klux Klan in the murders by having his officers keep watch over the men's position in town. Rainey was a member of Mississippi's White Knights of the Ku Klux Klan and had previously gone to court for the shooting of an unarmed black motorist in 1959.

He was charged with violating the victims' civil rights alongside one of his deputies, Cecil Price, but was acquitted in 1967. Rainey lost his position in law enforcement and died of cancer in 2002.

== Background ==
Rainey grew up in Neshoba and Kemper County, Mississippi. His parents were John and Bessie Rainey. Rainey had a younger brother who died at a young age. Rainey's education stopped in the 8th grade, which was not unusual in the early 20th century. His father was a farmer, and they were likely poor sharecroppers during the Great Depression. He worked as a mechanic before starting a career in law enforcement. He was married to Glady Marie Tolbert, with whom he had two sons, Lawrence Andrew Jr. (1955–2021) and John David (1957–2019). Rainey started his career as a police officer working in Philadelphia, Mississippi. He successfully ran for the office of Sheriff in 1963 and has been quoted as positioning himself as "the man who can cope with situations that might arise", a veiled reference to the racial tension in the area at the time.

=== Killing of Luther Jackson ===
On October 30, 1959, Rainey pulled over 27-year-old Korean War veteran Luther Jackson. Jackson of Flint, Michigan and Chicago, Illinois, was a former resident of Philadelphia and had come to town to claim a murdered relative's body. He was forcefully dragged out of his car and out of sight of his passenger, Hattie Thompson. After a few seconds, Thompson heard two gunshots and later recounted hearing Rainey say, apparently into his two-way radio, "Come on down here. I think I have killed a nigger". Two shots in the heart and stomach killed Jackson. Three policemen, including chief of police Bill Richardson, arrived at the scene in response. Upon Thompson saying that Jackson was killed "over nothing", she was beaten by the officers and fined US$25 (equivalent to $276 in 2025) for disorderly conduct. Rainey claimed that Jackson had resisted arrest, alleging that the victim had choked him and pleaded self-defense. The shooting was deemed a justifiable homicide, and Rainey was not prosecuted.

== Other Victims ==
=== Kirk Culberson and Harry Hatorn ===
On January 26, 1964, Rainey and Cecil Price searched 46-year-old Kirk Culberson's service station for Harry Hatorn (who was involved in a shooting with Culberson's pistol), and arrested Culberson and Hatorn on drunkenness charges.

Culberson: In his testimony, Culberson said that he was arrested at his small garage after a friend was involved in a shooting with a pistol that belonged to him. He said that on the way to the jail, the car was stopped and he was questioned. He contended that either Rainey or Price, he did not know which, suddenly hit him with something hard (later revealed to be a blackjack), knocking him to the floor. He was hit again when he tried to rise, he said. He was then beaten more as he lay unconscious.

Culberson suffered severe head injuries, required a five-week hospital stay, lost his property, went into debt, and was left permanently unable to work. The federal indictments against the lawmen coincided with wider investigations into racial violence and the murders of three civil rights workers in Neshoba County.

== Freedom Summer murders ==
On the afternoon of June 21, 1964, Chaney, Goodman, & Schwerner arrived at Longdale to inspect the burned-out church in Neshoba County. They left Longdale around 3 p.m. They would be in Meridian by 4 p.m. that day. The fastest route to Meridian was through Philadelphia. At the fork of Beacon & Main Street, their station wagon sustained a flat tire. It is possible that a shot was fired at the station wagon's tire. Rainey's home was near the Beacon & Main Street fork. Deputy Cecil Price soon arrived and escorted them to the county jail. Price released the trio as soon as the longest day of the year became night, about 10 p.m. The three were last seen heading south along Highway 19 toward Meridian.

On the day of the murders, Rainey was visiting his wife at the hospital in Meridian. He allegedly left Meridian about 6 p.m. for Collinsville where he had supper with relatives. Rainey visited his stepmother in Philadelphia and then went to his office to pick up some clothing. He went to his home to pick up some gowns for his wife and left the gowns with his relatives in Collinsville, where he watched television shows Bonanza and Candid Camera, then returned home. At the trial, it was alleged but not proven that he had learned of the murder early the following morning and deliberately covered it up.

On July 18, 1964, Rainey unsuccessfully sued NBC, the Lamar Life Broadcasting Company, Southern Television Corporation, and Buford W. Posey (a Philadelphia, Mississippi resident who became a civil rights activist) for US$1 million (equivalent to $10.4 million in 2025) for slander due to an interview which Posey gave to NBC during the investigation of the disappearance of the civil rights workers.

== Prosecution ==
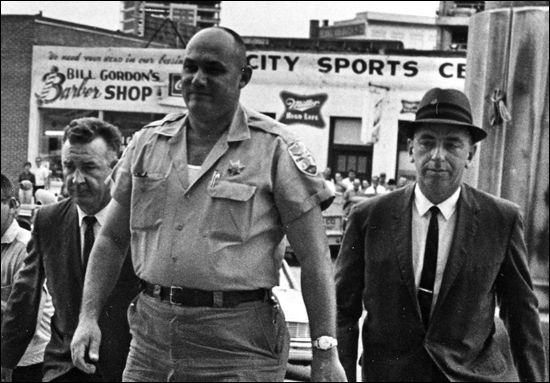
Rainey being escorted by two FBI agents to the federal courthouse in Meridian, Mississippi; October 1964

On January 15, 1965, Rainey and seventeen others learned they were indicted. Because there was, at that time, no federal murder statute, they were charged with violation of the three men's civil rights. In 1967, the case went to trial in federal court, and Rainey was acquitted, although six others were convicted.

Despite his acquittal, Rainey was stigmatized by his role in the events. His law enforcement career ended in 1968 when he was not re-elected as Sheriff of Neshoba County. As a result of the trial, his wife became an alcoholic, and they divorced. She subsequently died of a brain tumor. Rainey later married his second wife Juanita and became the stepfather of her three children.

For years after the Freedom Summer murders, Rainey had difficulty finding stable employment; he worked as an auto mechanic and as a security guard in Kentucky and Mississippi, including a long stint as a security guard in Meridian, Mississippi. Rainey's employers included the Matty Hersee State Charity Hospital and the Village Fair Mall. A stint at the IGA grocery store ended abruptly after the airing of the CBS drama Attack on Terror: The FBI vs. the Ku Klux Klan in 1975; bomb threats were made against the supermarket for hiring him, and they subsequently fired him. His boss at McDonald's Security Guard Service was an African American, and Rainey described the firm as "better to work for than any white company".

He later blamed the Federal Bureau of Investigation and the media for preventing him from finding and keeping jobs and reiterated that he was not a racist:

They tried to make it that I hated the black people, and it was just because I had to shoot two, ... Anyone I mistreated in law enforcement made me do it in order of fulfilling my job and duties (…) You got trash in all colors."

— Lawrence A. Rainey, People, Since Mississippi Burned, January 9, 1989

He developed throat cancer and tongue cancer and died at his home in Meridian, Mississippi, in 2002, at the age of 79. He was buried near his family in Kemper County.

== Media portrayals ==
Attack on Terror: The FBI vs. the Ku Klux Klan was the first fictional version of the Freedom Summer murders. Actor Geoffrey Lewis portrayed Sheriff Ed Duncan, a fictionalized Lawrence Rainey.

In the 1988 film Mississippi Burning, the character of Sheriff Ray Stuckey was a fictionalized depiction of Lawrence Rainey. The part was played by Gailard Sartain.

== See also ==
- Samuel Bowers
- Olen Lovell Burrage
- Edgar Ray Killen
- Cecil Price
- Alton Wayne Roberts
- Jimmy Snowden
- Herman Tucker
- Civil Rights Movement
- United States v. Price
