= McNeil Island Corrections Center =

Prison in Washington state, United States

McNeil Island Corrections Center (MICC)
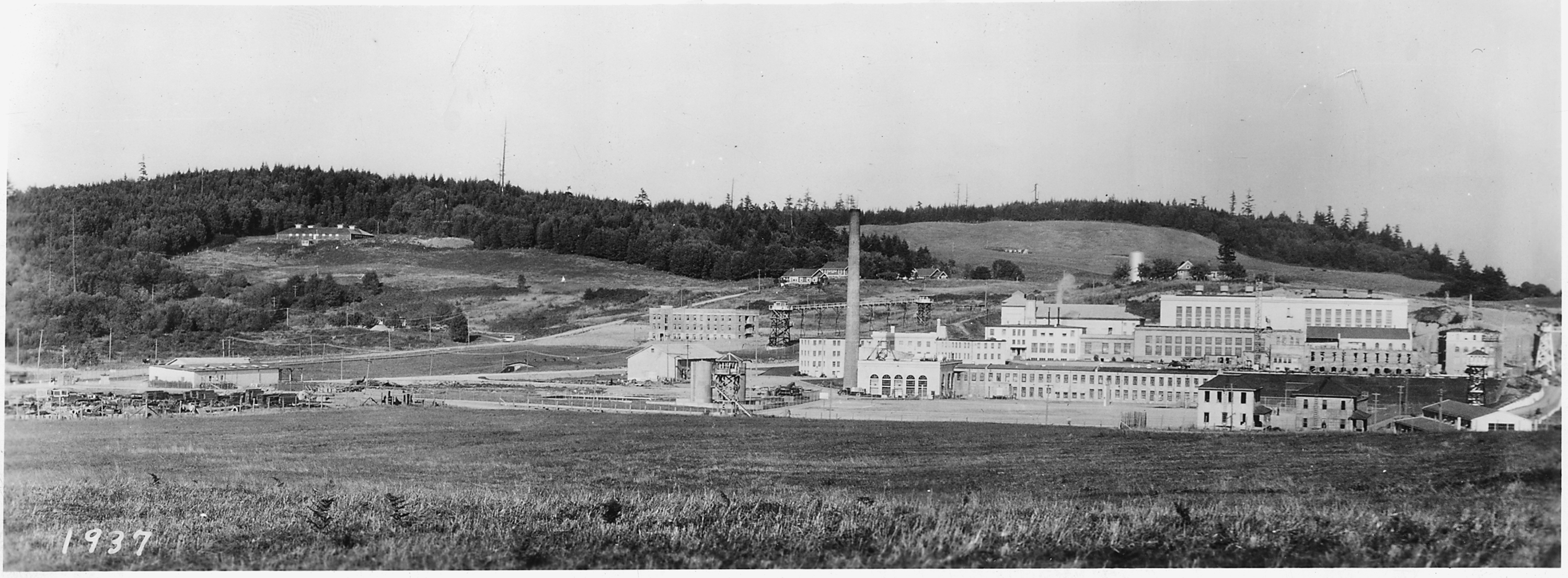
- McNeil Island in 1937

- Location in Washington Location in the United States
- Location: McNeil Island; 47°11′48″N 122°39′28″W
- Status: Closed
- Security class: Medium
- Capacity: 853
- Opened: 1875; 151 years ago
- Closed: 2011
- Former name: McNeil Island Federal Penitentiary (1904–1981)
- Managed by: Federal Bureau of Prisons (1904–1981); Washington State Department of Corrections (1981–2011)

The McNeil Island Corrections Center (MICC) was a prison in the northwest United States, operated by the Washington State Department of Corrections. It was on McNeil Island in Puget Sound in unincorporated Pierce County, near Steilacoom, Washington.

== History ==
Opened in 1875, it had previously served as a territorial correctional facility and then a federal penitentiary. Americans sentenced to terms of imprisonment by the United States courts that operated in China in the late nineteenth and early twentieth centuries served their terms at McNeil Island. In the 1910s, inmates included Robert Stroud, the "Birdman of Alcatraz", who fatally stabbed a prison guard in March 1916.

During World War II, eighty-five Japanese Americans who had resisted the draft to protest their wartime confinement, including civil rights activist Gordon Hirabayashi, were sentenced to prison terms at McNeil; all were pardoned by President Harry S. Truman in 1947. Career criminal and novelist James Fogle was sent to McNeil at the age of 17 in the 1950s.

In 1981, the State of Washington began to lease the facility from the federal government, and later that year the state department of corrections began moving prisoners into the facility, renamed "McNeil Island Corrections Center." In 1984, the island was deeded to the state government.

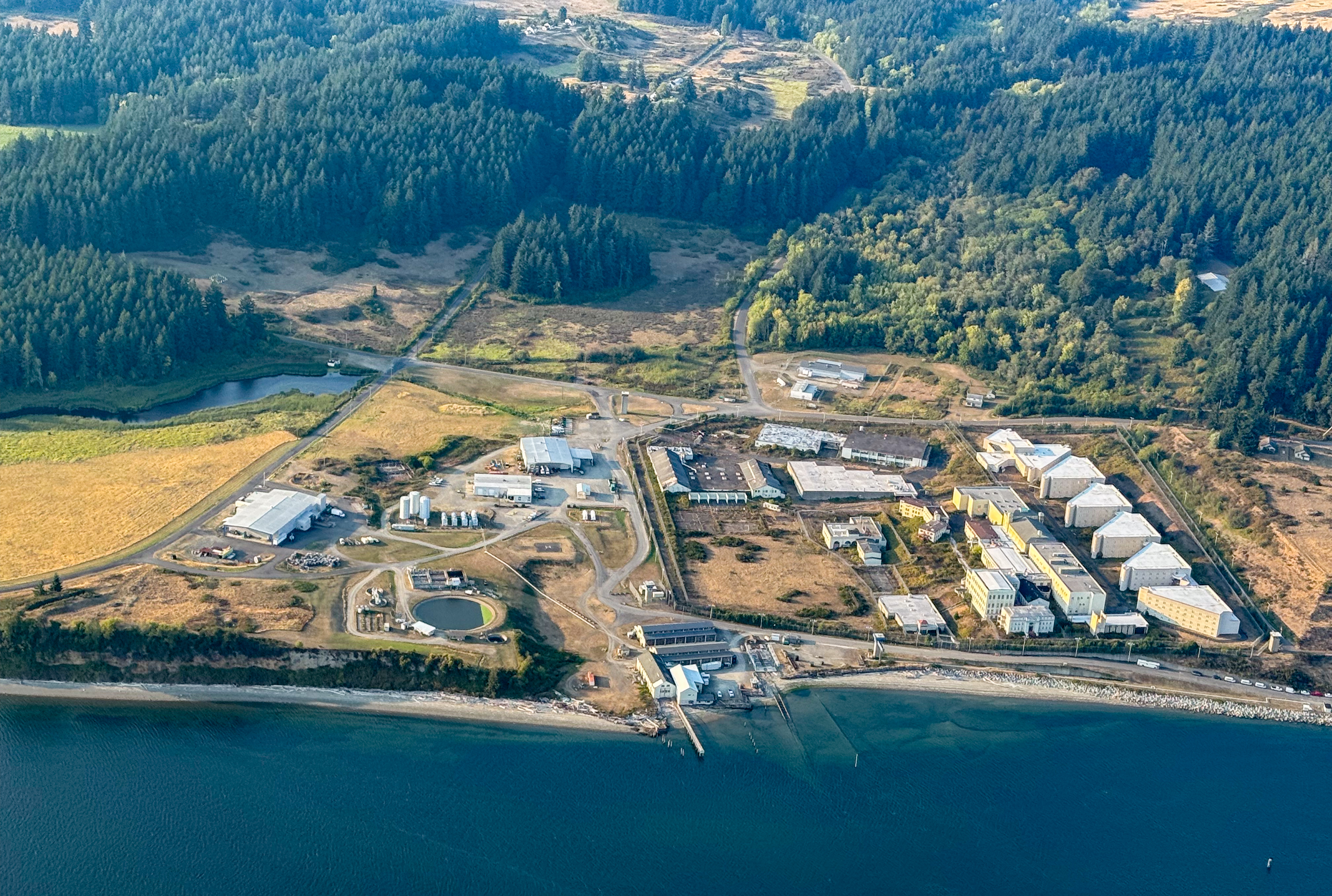
Former prison on McNeil Island, Washington

In November 2010, the department announced its plans to close the penitentiary by 2011, saving $14 million in the process.

== Notable inmates ==
- Mickey Cohen, 1930s Los Angeles mobster
- Anselmo L. Figueroa, Mexican anarchist
- Roy Gardner, bank robber, escaped from McNeil, 1921
- Vincent Hallinan, 1952 presidential candidate
- Gordon Hirabayashi, resister against Japanese American internment during World War II
- Alvin Karpis, Depression-era gangster
- Tomoya Kawakita, war criminal and collaborator with Imperial Japan
- Charles Manson, of the Manson Family
- John David Norman, pedophile, sex offender and sex trafficker
- Roy Olmstead, bootlegger
- Alton Wayne Roberts, convicted by United States v. Price of the murders of Chaney, Goodman, and Schwerner
- Robert Franklin Stroud, "The Birdman of Alcatraz", convicted murderer and cause célèbre

== See also ==
- List of law enforcement agencies in Washington (state)
- List of United States state correction agencies
- List of U.S. state prisons
