= White Knights of the Ku Klux Klan =

American Ku Klux Klan organization

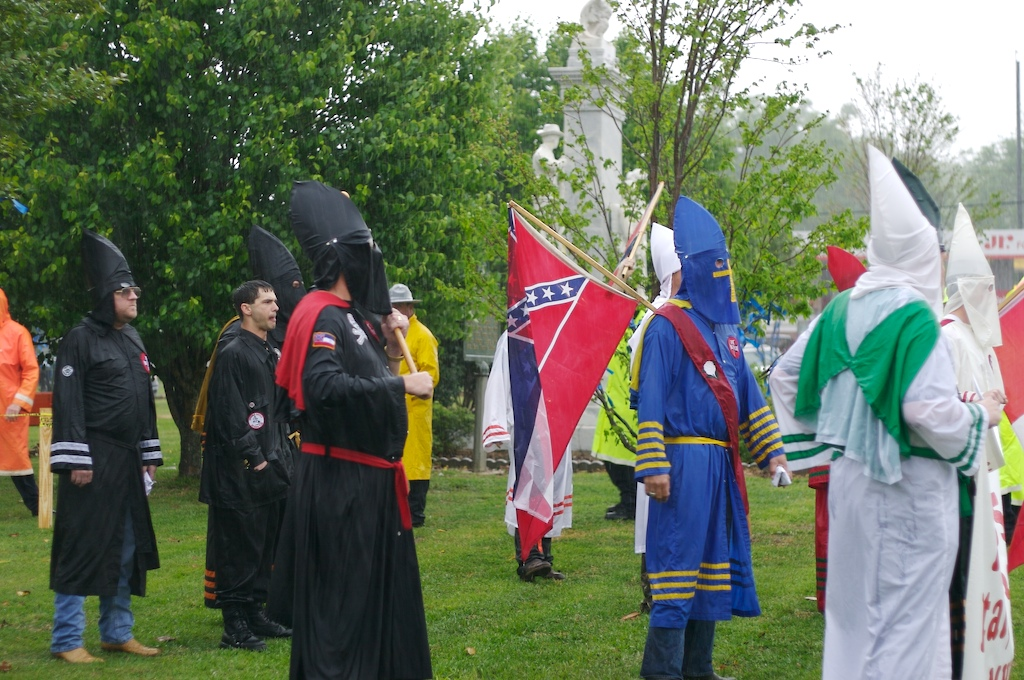
Mississippi White Knights of the Ku Klux Klan at a 2007 event

The White Knights of the Ku Klux Klan is a Ku Klux Klan (KKK) organization primarily located in Mississippi and Louisiana and active in the United States. The organization is known for using violence against activists in the civil rights movement.

== Origins ==
It originated in Mississippi and Louisiana in the early 1960s under the leadership of Samuel Bowers, its first Imperial Wizard. The White Knights of Mississippi were formed in December 1963, when they separated from the Original Knights of Mississippi after the resignation of Imperial Wizard Roy Davis. Roughly 200 members of the Original Knights of Louisiana also joined the White Knights. Within a year, their membership was up to around six thousand, and they had Klaverns (local branches of the Ku Klux Klan) in over half of the counties in Mississippi. By 1967, the number of active members had declined to around four hundred. Similar to the United Klans of America (UKA), the White Knights are very secretive about their group.

== Investigations by the House Un-American Activities Committee ==
In late 1965, the House Un-American Activities Committee initiated investigation of the KKK starting the first hearings in January 1966.

During one of these hearings on January 4, 1966, John D. Swenson, Louisiana Grand Dragon of the Original Knights of the Ku Klux Klan was compelled to testify about klan activities before Congress. During this hearing Swenson refused to answer questions from chair of the committee Representative Edwin Willis as to whether he was one of the initial founders of the Original Knights of the Ku Klux Klan or identified with his reputation as the "modern day father of the Klan in Louisiana." James R. Venable, an attorney who also served as chairman of the National Association of Knights of the Ku Klux Klan, represented Swenson during these hearings.

In later hearing, Swenson told Congress, the KKK in Mississippi had been dormant until it was revived by Imperial Wizard Roy Davis who used a clause in the KKK oath to reactivate the organization. Davis had been a leader and a founding member of the 1915 KKK. Following Davis's departure from the Original Knights of the Ku Klux Klan in 1963 and allegations that klan funds had been misused, the organization split three ways. The Original Knights in Mississippi and about 200 members of the Original Knights in Louisiana broke away and formed the White Knights of the Ku Klux Klan under the leadership of Samuel Bowers, the former Mississippi Grand Dragon of the Original Knights.

== Murder of civil rights activists ==
=== Murders of Chaney, Goodman, and Schwerner ===
The White Knights were responsible for many bombings, church burnings, beatings, and murders. In 1964, they murdered three civil rights workers: Andrew Goodman, James Chaney, and Michael Schwerner (their murder was later depicted in the 1988 film Mississippi Burning, loosely based on these events). The victims were members of the Congress of Racial Equality (CORE).

White Knights leader Samuel Bowers had targeted Schwerner because of his efforts to promote racial equality and because of his efforts to encourage Black people to register to vote during Freedom Summer.

In his first attempt to kill Schwerner, Bowers assembled 30 White Knights on the evening of Memorial Day 1964 and surrounded the Mount Zion United Methodist Church while a meeting was taking place inside it. Bowers thought that Schwerner would be in attendance, but after he failed to find him when the meeting let out, the Knights started beating the Black people who were present, then they poured gasoline inside the church and set the church on fire.

At the time of the fire, Schwerner had been in Ohio working on helping the National Council of Churches find more students who were willing to participate in the Freedom Summer project. When he found out about the church burning, he decided to drive back to Mississippi. Accompanying him were 21-year-old James Chaney, a black man, and Andrew Goodman. They were heading to Longdale in Neshoba County, where the sheriff, Lawrence A. Rainey, and his deputy, Cecil Price, were members of the Klan, although the Klansmen never publicly announced it.

When the three activists arrived in Neshoba County, Price saw their car driving down the highway and pulled them over on the premise that they had possibly been involved in the burning of the Mount Zion United Methodist Church. They were confined in the Neshoba County Jail and denied their right to make phone calls, while Price worked out plans for their murder with another White Knights member, Edgar Ray Killen. Hours later, Price released them but he followed them in his patrol car. The trio knew that they were being followed, and they eventually stopped their car, at which point Price ordered them into his vehicle. Two cars which were full of Klansmen pulled up, and all three activists were shot at close range. Their bodies were placed together in a hollow at a dam construction site on a farm which belonged to trucking company owner Olen Lovell Burrage and then they were covered with tons of dirt which was moved by a Caterpillar D4, most likely driven by heavy machinery operator Herman Tucker who owned the machine and had been hired by Burrage to build the dam.

It was months before any indictments were made. Rainey and Price were indicted in 1965, but 18 members of the White Knights who were also involved in the crime were not indicted until 1967. Six men were convicted, including Bowers and Price. Seven men were found not guilty, and one man was acquitted of all of the charges. Bowers and Alton Wayne Roberts (who shot Chaney, Goodman, and Schwerner) each received the longest prison sentences, 10 years.

Killen was initially spared from conviction because one of the jurors flatly refused to convict a man who she knew was a preacher. However, he was eventually convicted of the murders in June 2005, 40 years after the fact. At the age of 79, he was sentenced to serve "three 20-year terms, one term for each conviction of manslaughter in connection to the deaths of Chaney, Goodman, and Schwerner in 1964."

=== Murder of Medgar Evers ===
On June 12, 1963, member Byron De La Beckwith murdered Medgar Evers, civil rights leader and the NAACP's first state field secretary shortly after the activist arrived home in Jackson, Mississippi.

In 1964, he was tried twice on a murder charge in Mississippi. The all-white male juries each ended in hung juries, and De La Beckwith went free. In 1994, based on new evidence, he was tried again. He was convicted of murder and sentenced to life in prison, where he died in 2001 at the age of 80.

== 1980s to present day ==
The Ku Klux Klan's activity in Mississippi, and specifically, the activity of the White Knights of the Ku Klux Klan, did not stop after the Civil Rights Movement. In 2017, six different Klan organizations were publicly identified in Mississippi, and three of them were identified as White Knights organizations.

In 1989, The White Knights of Mississippi attempted to go national by appointing professional wrestler Johnny Lee Clary, whose stage name was "Johnny Angel", to succeed the retiring Samuel Bowers as its new Imperial Wizard. Clary appeared on many talk shows, including The Oprah Winfrey Show and The Morton Downey Jr. Show, in an effort to build a new, modern image for the Ku Klux Klan. It was thought that Clary could build membership in the Klan due to his celebrity status as a professional wrestler.

Clary tried to unify the various chapters of the Klan by holding a meeting in the birthplace of the Ku Klux Klan, Pulaski, Tennessee, only to see it fall apart because of infighting which occurred when the Klan's various chapters came together. Clary's girlfriend was revealed to be an F.B.I. informant, which resulted in distrust of Clary among members of the different Klan chapters. Clary resigned from the Klan and later, he became a born-again Christian and a civil rights activist.

With the conviction of Killen in 2005, an earlier chapter in the history of the White Knights of Mississippi came to a close. Price died in 2001; Wayne Roberts is also deceased.

== In art, entertainment, and media ==
- The film Mississippi Burning (1988) is based on the events surrounding the White Knights' murders of Chaney, Goodman, and Schwerner.

== See also ==
- West End Synagogue
- Leonard William Armstrong
- List of Ku Klux Klan organizations
- Jonathan David Brown
- Damien Patton

== Bibliography ==
- Nelson, Jack (1993). Terror in the Night: The Klan's Campaign Against the Jews. New York: Simon & Schuster. ISBN 0-671-69223-2.
