= John Proctor (FBI agent) =

FBI agent

John Hamiter Proctor Jr. (April 19, 1926 in Reform, Alabama – May 30, 1999 in Meridian, Mississippi) was an American FBI agent (1951–1978) and U.S. Navy signalman second class from 1944 to 1946 and served during World War II. He was most famous for his role in investigating the murders of Chaney, Goodman, and Schwerner in 1964.

Proctor had been stationed by the FBI in Meridian, Mississippi where he cultivated contacts with local law enforcement, the Ku Klux Klan, and other residents. Proctor's interrogation of Klan informant James Jordan was a key break in the case.

The character of FBI agent Rupert Anderson from the film Mississippi Burning, played by Gene Hackman, is loosely based on Proctor.

== Death ==
John Proctor died at the Queen City Nursing Home in Meridian, Mississippi on May 30, 1999, of heart failure at the age of 73, leaving behind his wife, Mary Randall “Randy” Davis (1930–2013), their three children (John III, Pamela, and Patricia), and six grandchildren.
