= Color (law) =

Legal term

In the United States Code, the term color of law describes and defines an action that has either a "mere semblance of legal right", or the "pretense of right", or the "appearance of right", which adjusts and colors the law to the circumstance, while the apparently legal action is itself illegal. In U.S. and UK jurisprudence, an action realized under color of law is an act realized by an official as if they were authorized to take the apparently legal action not authorized by statute or common law.

The term colour of law first was used in English statutory law in the 13th century, originating from the fact that the soldiers and officials of the Crown carried the flag and coat of arms of the sovereign to indicate that they were acting under the legitimate authority of the sovereign. As a descriptor of official malfeasance, in the article "The Meaning of Under Color of Law" (1992), Steven L. Winter said that “through the first half of the nineteenth century, colore officii (Latin for "by color of office") was a common-law term of art referring to the illegal or [to the] unauthorized actions of governmental officials”, which the U.S. Congress applied in several laws, such as the authorization of federal officials to seek the removal of state-level criminal charges presented against them into the federal court system.

== Color of law ==
The term color of law refers to the appearance of legality in the exercise of legal power to realize an action that violates the law. If a police officer exercises color-of-law authority to arrest a person without probable cause, the arrest was effected in violation of the law; the Federal Bureau of Investigation (FBI) investigates formal accusations against police who have acted beyond the scope of their lawful authority and so violated the civil rights of a citizen. The Supreme Court's interpretations of the U.S. Constitution have derived laws that regulate the actions of the police. Under the guise of the color of law, it is a crime for one or more government employees to use their police powers to either deprive or to conspire to willfully deprive a person of his or her Constitutional rights. Crimes committed under color of law include acts within and beyond the boundaries of legal authority, which includes the personal conduct of police officers who assert their official status when off duty.

=== Deprivation of rights under color of law ===
The deprivation of rights under color of law is a federal criminal offense which occurs when any person, under color of any law, statute, ordinance, regulation, or custom, willfully subjects any person on any U.S. territory or possession to the deprivation of any rights, privileges, or immunities secured or protected by the Constitution or laws of the United States, or to different punishments, pains, or penalties, on account of such person being by reason of his color, or race, than are prescribed for the punishment of citizens (18 U.S.C. § 242). When two or more persons conspire to prevent the exercise of constitutional rights, or to punish an individual for having exercised them, it is deemed a conspiracy against rights (18 U.S.C. § 241). The death penalty is applicable in extreme cases when the crimes cause the death of the individual being deprived of statutory or constitutional rights. Remedy by civil action is also possible: 42 U.S.C. § 1983.

== Color of office ==
"Color of office" refers to an act usually committed by a public official under the appearance of authority but exceeds such authority. An affirmative act or omission, committed under color of office, is sometimes required to prove malfeasance in office.

== Color of title ==
"Color of title", in property law, refers to a claim to title that appears valid but may be legally defective. Color of title may arise if there is evidence, such as a writing, suggesting valid legal title. The courts have ruled that deeds are mere color of title; the actual title to land is secured with an irrefutable instrument, like a land patent. When that land is subsequently conveyed to another owner by a deed, the deed colors the title to show the new owner. Thus, the chain of title from the land patent to the present may include many deeds. The actual title remains with the land patent and lawful deeds show the chain of title to the present landowner. Because the ownership in land is a very specific thing, requiring precise and proper transfers of ownership, it used to be that people always required a certified abstract be provided with a deed to ensure the deed was not merely a color of title fiction. Today, title companies offer title insurance to secure such documents. Still, only a proper and lawful title, like the land patent, provides actual title to land; and only a proper and lawful chain of title (deeds, etc.) from such a patent to the present can secure land rights to the landowner.

However, even with land secured by patent, the proper grant of title can be implied by adverse possession, which is the basis for claims exemplified in Torrens title. The Torrens system operates on the principle of "title by registration" in which the act of registering an interest in land in a state-operated registry creates an indefeasible title in the registrant, which, like the land patent, can be challenged only in very limited circumstances.

=== Appropriation of name or likeness ===
Although it is a common-law tort, most states have enacted statutes that prohibit the use of a person's name or image if used without consent for the commercial benefit of another person. A person's exclusive rights to control his or her name and likeness to prevent others from exploiting personal information without permission is protected in similar manner to a title or trademark action with the person's likeness and personal information, rather than the trademark or title, being the subject of the protection.

The tort of false light involves a misappropriation or "major misrepresentation" of a person's "character, history, activities or belief". Some bodies of law also explicitly mention the estate of a person; false claims of nobility are most common. In the US, one who gives publicity to a matter concerning another that places the other before the public in a false light is subject to liability for invasion of privacy if

1. The false light would be highly offensive to a reasonable person; and
2. The actor acted with malice—had reason to know of or acted with reckless disregard as to the falsity of the publicized matter and the false light in which the other would be placed.

See Section 652E of the Restatement (Second) of Torts.

Public disclosure of private facts arises if a person reveals information which is not of public concern, the release of which would offend a reasonable person.

== See also ==
- Qualified immunity – a contrasting legal doctrine that may protect government officers from civil-suit damages.
