= Michael Schwerner =

American civil rights activist and murder victim (1939–1964)

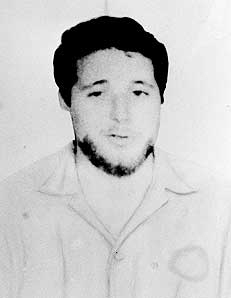
- Portrait of Schwerner
- Born: Michael Henry Schwerner; November 6, 1939; Pelham, New York, U.S.
- Died: June 21, 1964 (aged 24); Philadelphia, Mississippi, U.S.
- Cause of death: Murder (gunshot wounds)
- Other name: Mickey Schwerner
- Education: Cornell University
- Spouse: Rita Levant (m. 1962)
- Awards: Presidential Medal of Freedom (Posthumous; 2014)

Michael Henry "Mickey" Schwerner (November 6, 1939 – June 21, 1964) was an American civil-rights activist. He was one of three civil rights workers murdered in rural Neshoba County, Mississippi, by members of the Ku Klux Klan. Schwerner and two co-workers, James Chaney and Andrew Goodman, were killed in response to their civil rights work, which included promoting voting registration among African Americans, most of whom had been disenfranchised in the state since 1890.

== Early life ==
Michael Henry Schwerner was born in Pelham, New York, on November 6, 1939, to a Jewish family. Schwerner attended Pelham Memorial High School. His mother, Anne Siegel (May 1, 1912 – November 29, 1996), was a science teacher at nearby New Rochelle High School, and his father, Nathan Schwerner (June 19, 1909 – March 6, 1991), was a businessman.

Schwerner was called Mickey by his friends. He attended Michigan State University, originally intending to become a veterinarian. He transferred to Cornell University and switched his major to rural sociology. While an undergraduate at Cornell, he was initiated into the school's chapter of Alpha Epsilon Pi fraternity. He entered graduate school at the School of Social Work at Columbia University.

As a boy, Schwerner befriended Robert Reich, who later became U.S. Secretary of Labor. Schwerner helped protect Reich, who was smaller, from bullies.

== Civil rights activism ==
In the early 1960s Schwerner became active in working for civil rights for African Americans; he led a local Congress of Racial Equality (CORE) group on the Lower East Side of Manhattan, called "Downtown CORE." He participated in a 1963 effort to desegregate Gwynn Oak Amusement Park in Maryland. As activism increased in the South, Schwerner, recruited by John Lewis, and his wife, Rita Schwerner Bender, volunteered to work for National CORE in Mississippi, under the tutelage of Dave Dennis, the CORE state director. Bob Moses assigned the Schwerners to organize the community center and activities in Meridian. James Chaney was a local youth who started working with them there. The Schwerners were the first whites to be assigned by CORE permanently outside the state capital of Jackson. In the summer of 1964 CORE intended to hold classes and drives to register African Americans to vote in the state, what they called "Freedom Summer". Many volunteers, mostly college students and young adults, had been recruited from local communities and northern/western states to work on this project.

Civil rights activists were resented and held under suspicion by white Mississippians. Spies paid by the Mississippi State Sovereignty Commission, a taxpayer-funded agency, kept track of all northerners and suspected activists. The Commission conducted economic boycotts and intimidation against activists. In 1998 its records were opened by court order, revealing the state's deep complicity in the 1964 murders of three civil right workers because its investigator, A. L. Hopkins, passed on information about the workers, including their car license number, to the commission. Records showed the Commission passed the information on to the Sheriff of Neshoba County, Lawrence Rainey, who was implicated in the murders.

The Ku Klux Klan targeted Schwerner after he and his wife, Rita, had taken over the Meridian CORE field office, where they established a community center for blacks as part of grassroots organizing. Schwerner tried to establish contact with white working-class citizens of Meridian and went door-to-door to speak with them. He also organized a black boycott of a popular variety store until it hired its first African American, under the principle of "don't shop where you can't work".

== Murder ==
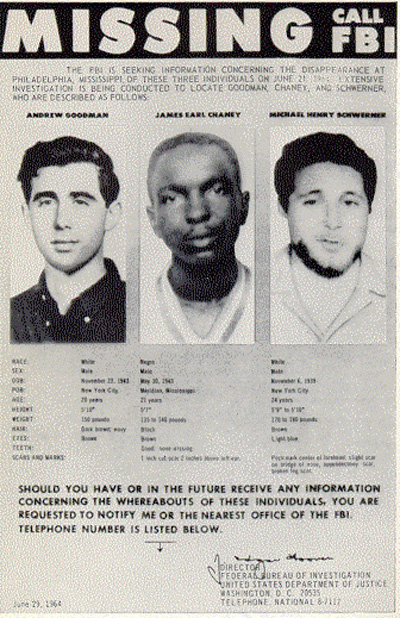
Missing persons poster created by the FBI in 1964 that shows the photographs of Andrew Goodman, James Chaney, and Michael Schwerner

James Chaney, Andrew Goodman, and Michael Schwerner were murdered near the town of Philadelphia, Mississippi. They were investigating the burning of Mt. Zion Methodist Church, which had been a site of a CORE Freedom School, in a nearby community. Parishioners had been beaten in the wake of Schwerner and Chaney's voter registration rallies for CORE. The Sheriff's Deputy, Cecil Price, had been accused by parishioners of stopping their caravan and forcing the deacons to kneel in the headlights of their own cars, while they were beaten with rifle butts. That same group of white men was identified as having burned the church.

Deputy Sheriff Cecil Price arrested Chaney, Goodman, and Schwerner for an alleged traffic violation and took them to the jail in Neshoba County. They were released that evening, without being allowed to telephone anyone. On the way back to Meridian, they were stopped on Highway 19, by patrol lights and two cars filled with members of the White Knights of the Ku Klux Klan. They were taken in Price's car to another remote rural road. One of the Klansmen, Alton Wayne Roberts, reportedly pulled Schwerner out of the car, pointed a gun at his chest, and asked "Are you that nigger lover?" Schwerner replied "Sir, I know just how you feel," before Roberts shot him in the heart. Goodman was killed by Roberts in the same manner, while Chaney was killed by either Roberts or James Jordan after being beaten, chain-whipped, and castrated.

The men's bodies remained undiscovered for 44 days. During that period, the search for them became a major national story, especially coming on top of other events during Freedom Summer. The federal government quickly assigned the FBI to a full investigation and called in Navy sailors and other forces to aid in the search.

Schwerner's widow Rita, who also worked for CORE in Meridian, expressed indignation publicly at the way the story was handled. She said she believed that if only Chaney (who was black) was missing and the two white men from New York had not been killed along with him, the case would not have received nearly as much national attention, as other black civil rights workers had earlier been killed in the South.

== First trial ==
The US government prosecuted the case under the Enforcement Act of 1870. Seven men, including Deputy Sheriff Price, were convicted. Three strongly implicated co-defendants were acquitted because of a jury deadlock.

== Reinvestigation ==
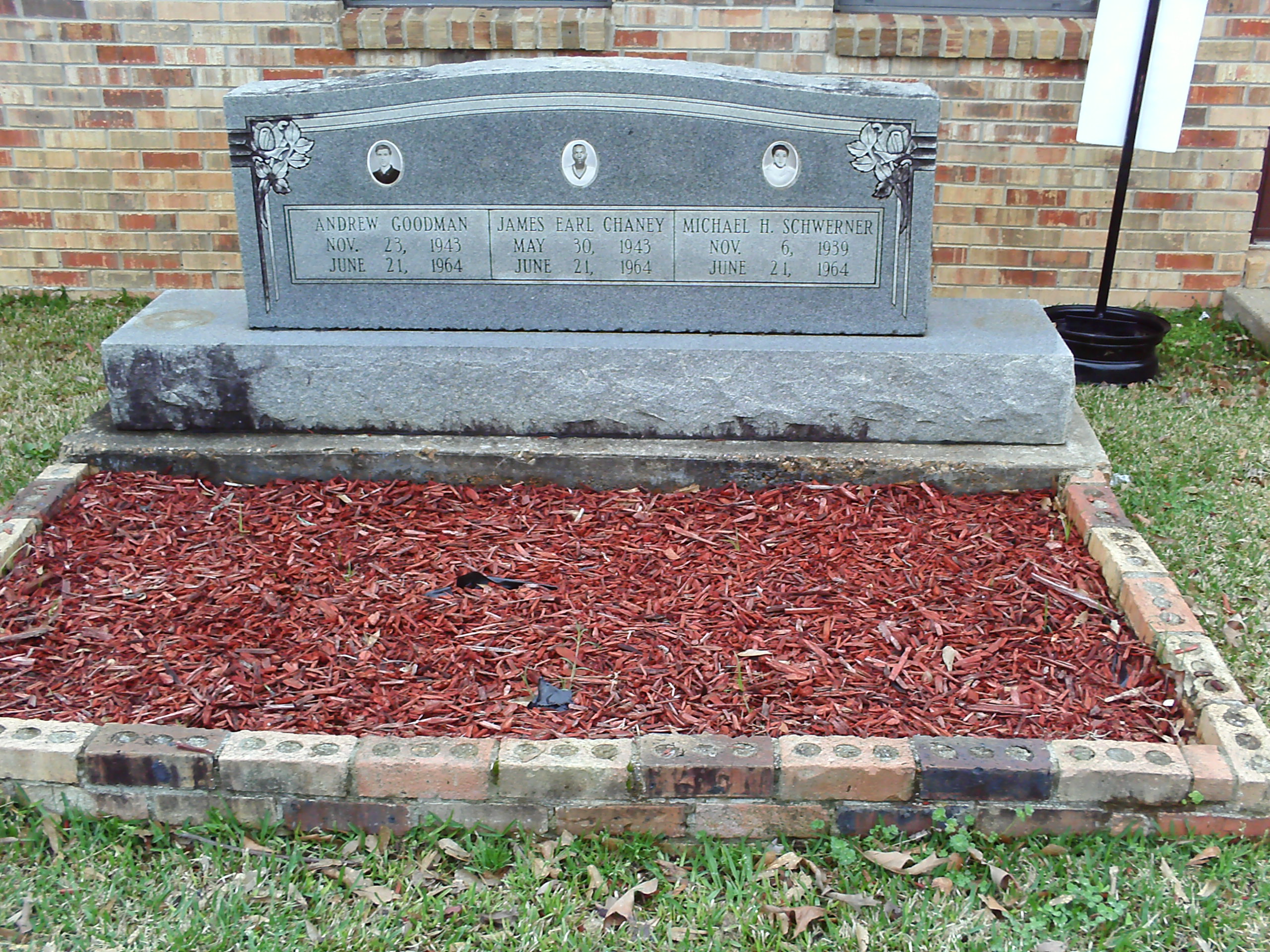
A memorial to victims Andrew Goodman, James Earl Chaney, and Michael Schwerner at Mt. Nebo Missionary Baptist Church in Philadelphia, Mississippi

Journalist Jerry Mitchell, an award-winning investigative reporter for the Jackson Clarion-Ledger had written extensively about the case for many years in the late 20th century. Mitchell had earned renown for helping secure convictions by his investigation of several other high-profile Civil Rights Era murder cases, including the assassination of Medgar Evers in Mississippi, the 1963 16th Street Baptist Church bombing in Birmingham, and the murder of Vernon Dahmer in his Mississippi home, the latter of which was ordered by Samuel Bowers, founder of the Klan chapter that killed the CORE activists. Mitchell developed new evidence, found new witnesses, and pressured the state to take action. Barry Bradford, an Illinois high school teacher, and three students: Allison Nichols, Sarah Siegel, and Brittany Saltiel, joined Mitchell's efforts. Their documentary, produced for the National History Day contest, presented important new evidence and compelling reasons for reopening the case. Bradford also obtained an interview with Edgar Ray Killen, which helped convince the State to reinvestigate. Mitchell was able to determine the identity of "Mr. X", the mystery informer who had helped the FBI discover the bodies and smash the conspiracy of the Klan in 1964. He relied in part on evidence developed by Bradford.

On January 7, 2005, Edgar Ray Killen, an outspoken white supremacist nicknamed "Preacher," pleaded "Not Guilty" to state charges of the murders of the three men. The jury found him guilty of three counts of manslaughter on June 21, 2005. He was the only man charged with homicide in connection to the killings. Killen was sentenced to sixty years in prison—twenty years for each count, served consecutively. Killen died in prison in 2018, aged 93.

== Personality ==
Schwerner "was described by family and friends as friendly, good-natured, gentle, mischievous, and 'full of life and ideas'. He believed all people were essentially good. He loved sports, animals, poker, W.C. Fields, and rock music."

Robert Reich, the American political commentator, professor, and author who served in the administrations of Presidents Gerald Ford, Jimmy Carter, and Bill Clinton, says that as a child, he was bullied, and sought out the protection of older boys; one of them was Michael Schwerner. Reich cites this event as an inspiration to "fight the bullies, to protect the powerless, to make sure that the people without a voice have a voice."

== Legacy and honors ==
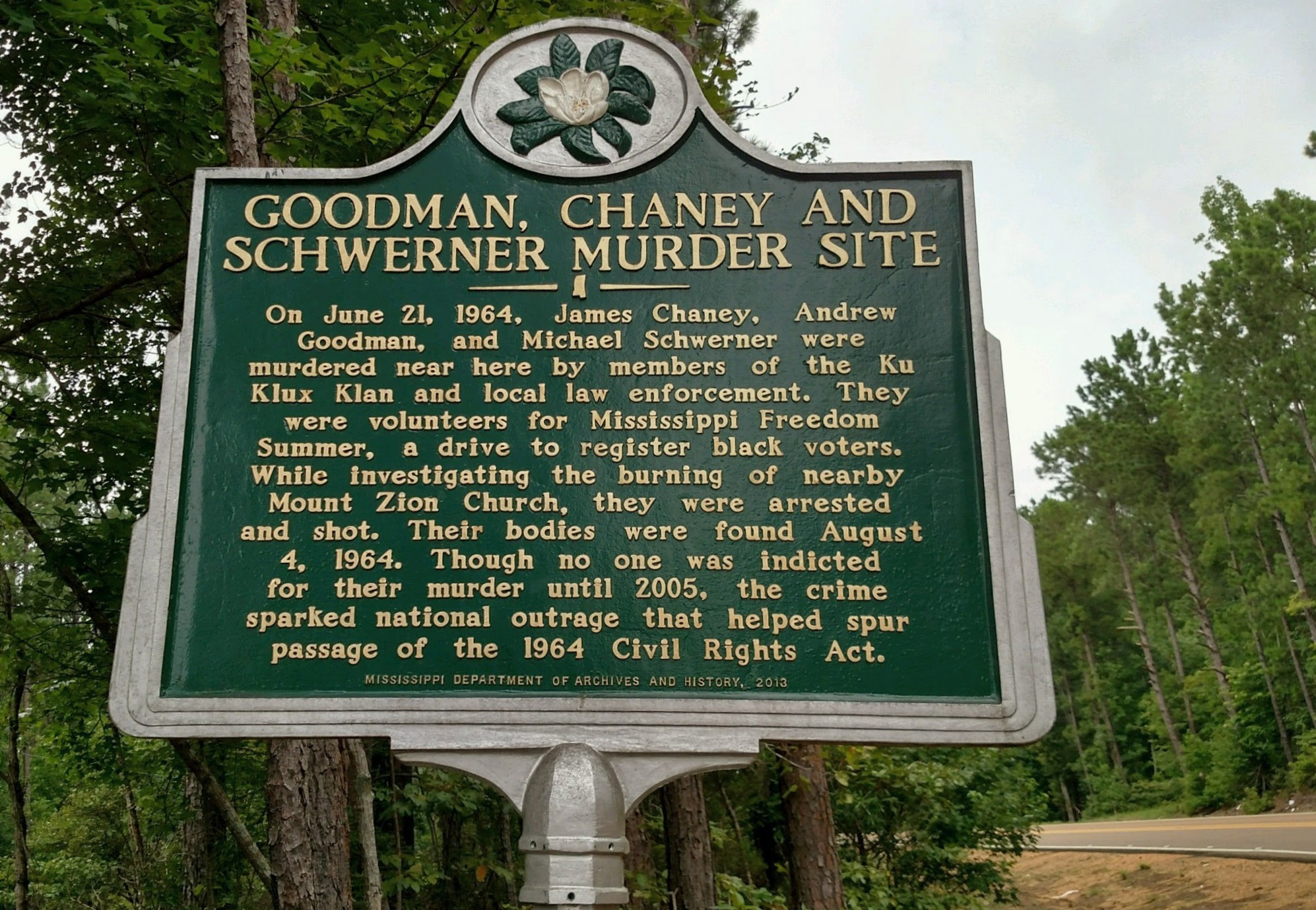
State of Mississippi roadside marker denoting the location where the 1964 murders of American civil rights workers Goodman, Chaney, and Schwerner took place

=== Schwerner ===
- In 2008, Schwerner's hometown of Pelham, New York, renamed a section of Harmon Avenue as "Michael Schwerner Way" in his honor.
- Schwerner, along with Goodman and Chaney, received a posthumous Presidential Medal of Freedom from President Barack Obama in 2014.

== See also ==
- Civil Rights Movement
