= Edgar Ray Killen =

Ku Klux Klan organizer convicted of manslaughter (1925–2018)

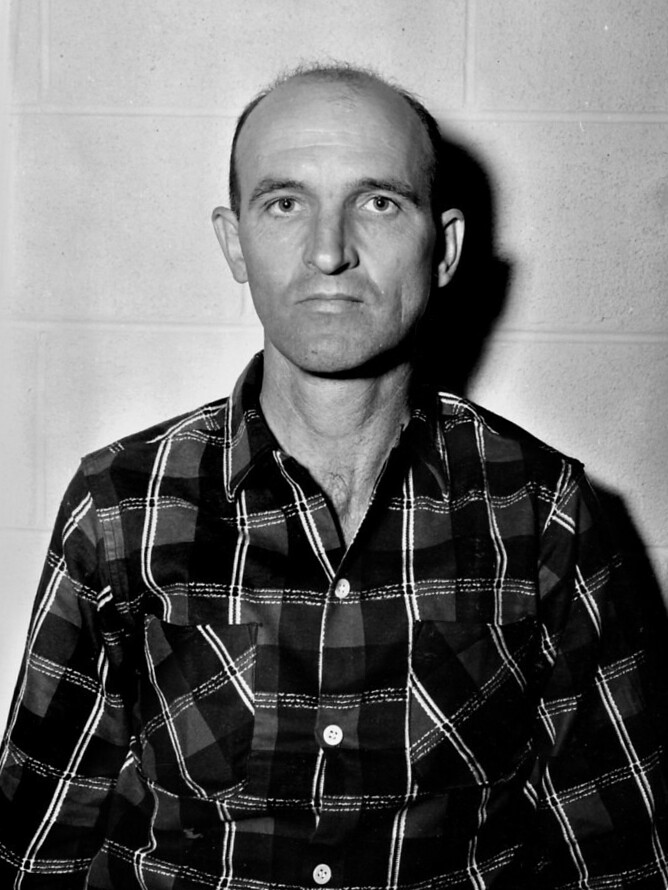
- Booking photo, late 1964
- Born: January 10, 1925; Philadelphia, Mississippi, U.S.
- Died: January 11, 2018 (aged 93); Mississippi State Penitentiary, Sunflower County, Mississippi, U.S.
- Occupations: KKK Kleagle, Baptist Minister
- Status: Deceased
- Motive: White supremacy
- Conviction: Manslaughter (3 counts)
- Penalty: 60 years imprisonment with the possibility of parole after 20 years

Details
- Victims: James Chaney, 21; Andrew Goodman, 20; Michael Schwerner, 24
- Country: United States
- State: Mississippi
- Date apprehended: January 6, 2005 (for the last time)

Edgar Ray Killen (January 10, 1925 – January 11, 2018) was an American Ku Klux Klan organizer who planned and directed the murders of James Chaney, Andrew Goodman, and Michael Schwerner, three civil rights activists participating in the Freedom Summer of 1964. He was found guilty in state court of three counts of manslaughter on June 21, 2005, the forty-first anniversary of the crime, and sentenced to 60 years in prison. He appealed the verdict, but the sentence was upheld on April 12, 2007, by the Supreme Court of Mississippi. He died in prison on January 11, 2018, at age 93.

== Early life ==
Edgar Ray Killen was born on January 10, 1925, in Philadelphia, Mississippi, as the oldest of eight children to Lonie Ray Killen (1901–1992) and Jetta Killen (née Hitt; 1903–1983). Killen was a sawmill operator and a part-time Baptist minister. He was a kleagle, or klavern recruiter and organizer, for the Neshoba and Lauderdale County chapters of the Ku Klux Klan.

== Murders ==
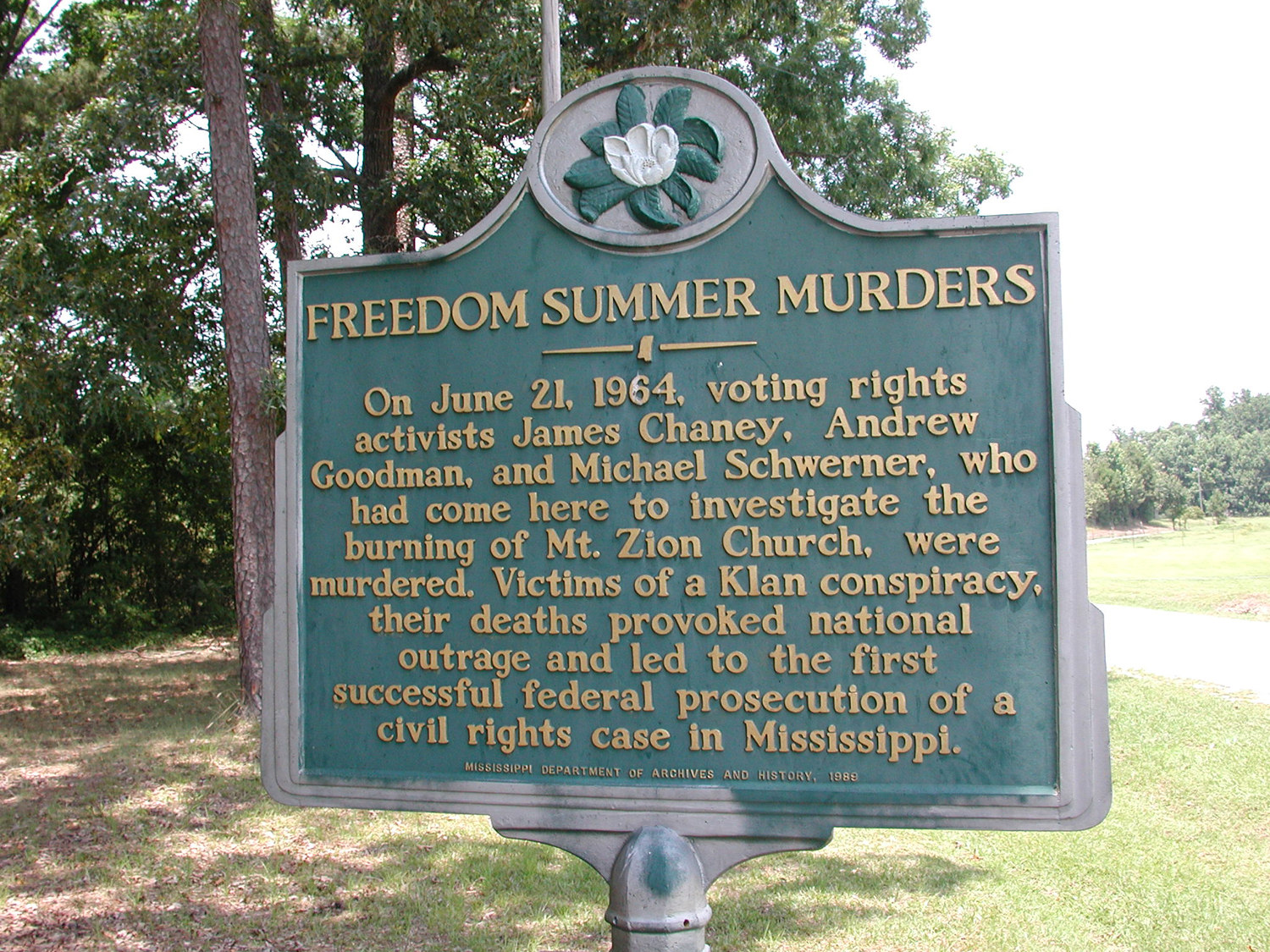
Mt. Zion Church state history marker

During the "Freedom Summer" of 1964, James Chaney, 21, a young Black man from Meridian, Mississippi, and Andrew Goodman, 20, and Michael Schwerner, 24, two Jewish men from New York, were murdered in Philadelphia, Mississippi. Killen, along with deputy sheriff of Neshoba County Cecil Price, was found to have assembled a group of armed men who conspired against, pursued, and killed the three civil rights workers. Samuel Bowers, who served as the Grand Wizard of the local White Knights of the Ku Klux Klan and had ordered the murders to take place, acknowledged that Killen was "the main instigator".

At the time of the murders, the state of Mississippi made almost no effort to prosecute the guilty parties. Attorney General Robert F. Kennedy and the Federal Bureau of Investigation (FBI), under President Lyndon B. Johnson, conducted a vigorous investigation. Circumventing dismissals by federal judges, federal prosecutor John Doar convened a grand jury in December 1964. In November 1965 Solicitor General Thurgood Marshall appeared before the Supreme Court to defend the federal government's authority in bringing charges. Eighteen men, including Killen, were arrested and charged with conspiracy to violate the victims' civil rights in United States v. Price.

The trial, which began in 1966 at the federal courthouse of Meridian before an all-white jury, convicted seven conspirators, including the deputy sheriff, and acquitted eight others. It was the first time a white jury convicted a white official of civil rights killings. For three men, including Killen, the trial ended in a hung jury, with the jurors deadlocked 11–1 in favor of conviction. The lone holdout said that she could not convict a preacher. The prosecution decided not to retry Killen and he was released. None of the men found guilty would serve more than six years in prison.

In 1974, Killen threatened via telephone a woman whose husband he suspected of adultery. He was arrested and sentenced to two years in prison, with six months suspended. He served five months.

More than 20 years later, Jerry Mitchell, an award-winning investigative reporter for The Clarion-Ledger in Jackson, Mississippi, wrote extensively about the case for six years. Mitchell helped to bring about convictions in other high-profile Civil Rights Era murder cases, including the assassination of Medgar Evers, the 16th Street Baptist Church bombing, and the murder of Vernon Dahmer. Mitchell assembled new evidence regarding the murders of the three civil rights workers. He also located new witnesses and pressured the state to take action. Assisting Mitchell were high school teacher Barry Bradford and a team of three students from Illinois. The students persuaded Killen to do his only taped interview (to that point) about the murders. The tape showed Killen competent, aware, and clinging to his segregationist views. The student-teacher team found more potential witnesses, created a website, lobbied the United States Congress, and focused national media attention on reopening the case. Carolyn Goodman, the mother of one of the victims, called them "super heroes".

The film Mississippi Burning is related to the murders.

== Reopening of the case ==
In early January 2004, a multiracial group of citizens in Neshoba County formed the Philadelphia Coalition, to seek justice for the 1964 murders. Led by co-chairs Leroy Clemons and Jim Prince, the group met over several months and then issued a call for justice, first in March 2004 and then on June 21, the 40th anniversary of the murders. That event was attended by over 1500 people. The sitting Mississippi governor was present and four congressmen, including Rep. John Lewis and Rep. Bennie Thompson. Former Mississippi Secretary of State Dick Molpus made a speech imploring those with information about the crimes to come forward. The Coalition met over the summer with state attorney general Jim Hood, along with Andrew Goodman's mother Carolyn Goodman and brother David Goodman. They asked Hood to re-open the case. The group also met with local district attorney Mark Duncan. The group was supported throughout by the William Winter Institute for Racial Reconciliation. In the fall of 2004, an anonymous donor provided funds through the Mississippi Religious Leadership Council for anyone with information leading to an arrest.

On January 6, 2005, Hood and Duncan convened a local grand jury, which indicted Edgar Ray Killen for the murders.

In 2004, Killen said he would attend a petition-drive on his behalf, conducted by the white supremacist Nationalist Movement at the 2004 Mississippi Annual State Fair in Jackson. Hinds County sheriff Malcolm McMillin conducted a counter-petition calling for a reopening of the state case against Killen. Killen was arrested for three counts of murder on January 6, 2005. He was freed on bond.

Killen's trial was scheduled for April 18, 2005. It was deferred after the 80-year-old Killen broke both legs while chopping lumber. The trial began on June 13, 2005, with Killen attending in a wheelchair. He was found guilty of manslaughter on June 21, 2005, 41 years to the day after the crime. The jury of nine white jurors and three Black jurors rejected the murder charges but found him guilty of manslaughter for recruiting the mob that carried out the killings. He was sentenced on June 23, 2005, by Circuit Judge Marcus Gordon to the maximum sentence of 60 years in prison, 20 years for each count of manslaughter, to be served consecutively. He would have been eligible for parole after 20 years. In his sentencing remarks Gordon said that each life lost was valuable, that the law made no distinction of age for the crime, and that the maximum sentence should be imposed regardless of Killen's age. Prosecuting the case were Mississippi Attorney General Jim Hood and Neshoba County District Attorney Mark Duncan.

== Incarceration and death ==
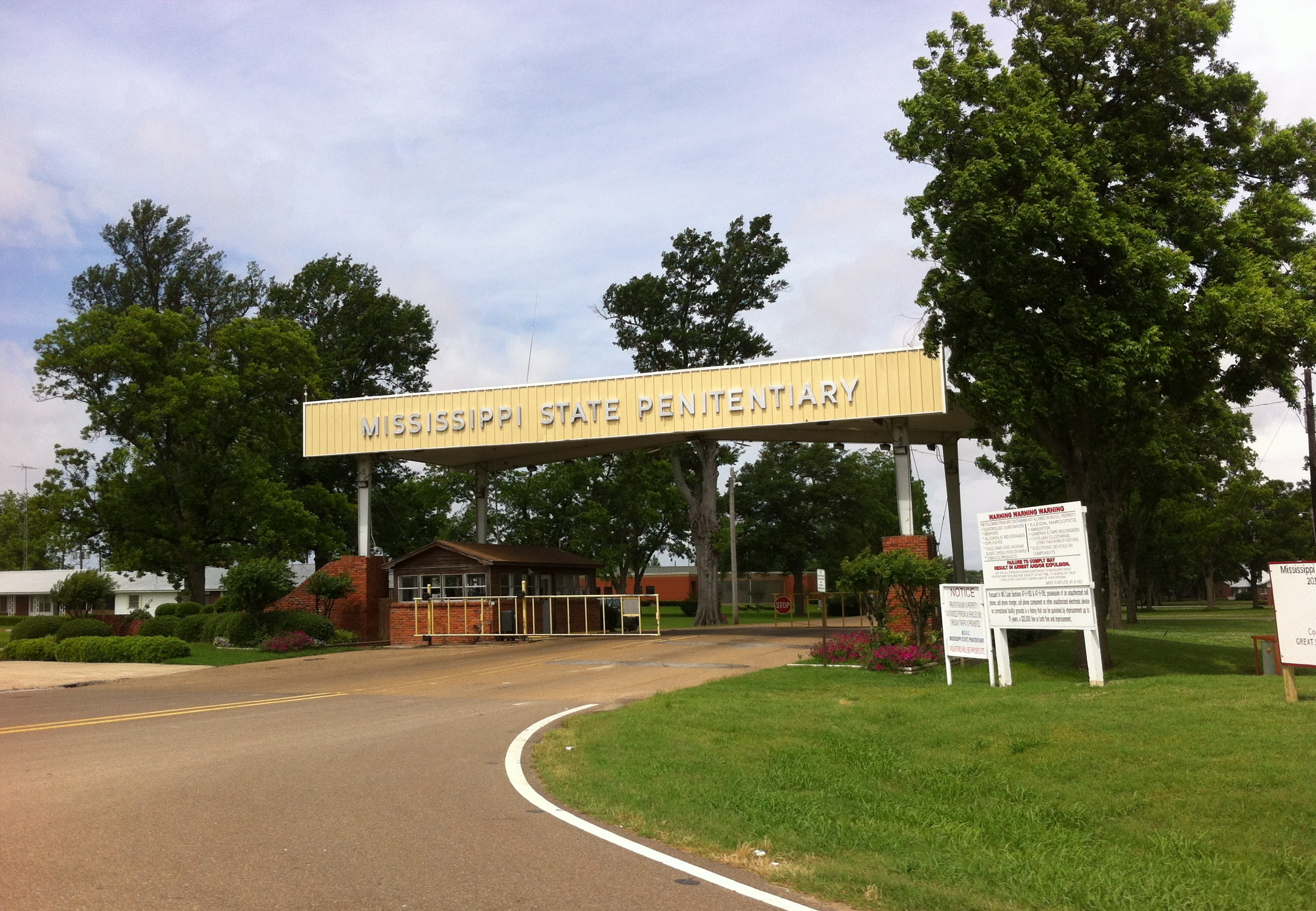
The entrance of Mississippi State Penitentiary, where Killen was incarcerated

Killen entered the Mississippi Department of Corrections system on June 27, 2005, to serve his sixty-year sentence. On August 12 he was released on a $600,000 appeal bond, having claimed he could not use his right hand (using his left hand to place his right hand on the Bible during swearing-in) and that he would permanently use a wheelchair for mobility. Judge Gordon said he was convinced Killen was neither a flight risk nor a danger to the community. On September 3, The Clarion-Ledger reported that a deputy sheriff saw Killen walking around "with no problem". At a hearing on September 9, several other deputies testified to seeing Killen driving in various locations. One deputy said Killen shook hands with him using his right hand. Gordon revoked the bond and ordered Killen back to prison, saying Killen had committed a fraud against the court.

Killen's request for a new trial was denied by a circuit court judge and he was transferred to the Central Mississippi Correctional Facility near Pearl. On March 29, 2006, Killen was moved to a City of Jackson hospital to treat complications of his leg injury sustained in the 2005 logging incident. On August 12, 2007, the Supreme Court of Mississippi affirmed Killen's conviction by a vote of 8–0 (one judge not participating).

In February 2010, Killen filed a lawsuit against the FBI alleging that one of his lawyers in his 1967 trial, Clayton Lewis, was an FBI informant, and that the FBI had hired "gangster and killer" Gregory Scarpa to coerce witnesses. On March 23, 2011, District Judge Daniel P. Jordan III adopted Magistrate F. Keith Ball's recommendation to dismiss Killen's lawsuit.

James Hart Stern, a Black preacher from California, shared a prison cell with Killen from August 2010 to November 2011 while serving time for wire fraud. Killen and Stern forged a close relationship, and Killen wrote dozens of letters to Stern outlining his views on race and confessing to other crimes. He also signed over his land in Mississippi to Stern and gave him power of attorney. Stern detailed his experience in the 2017 book Killen the KKK, co-authored by Autumn K. Robinson. On January 5, 2016, Stern used his power of attorney to dissolve Killen's branch of the KKK.

Stern claims that Killen admitted to being personally responsible for 32 additional murders. Stern says the admissions came in the form of hand-written letters from Killen, written while the two were incarcerated together.

Killen died on January 11, 2018, at the Mississippi State Penitentiary in Parchman, Mississippi, one day after his 93rd birthday.

== See also ==
- Civil rights movement
- Neshoba (film)
