= James Chaney =

American civil rights activist and murder victim (1943–1964)

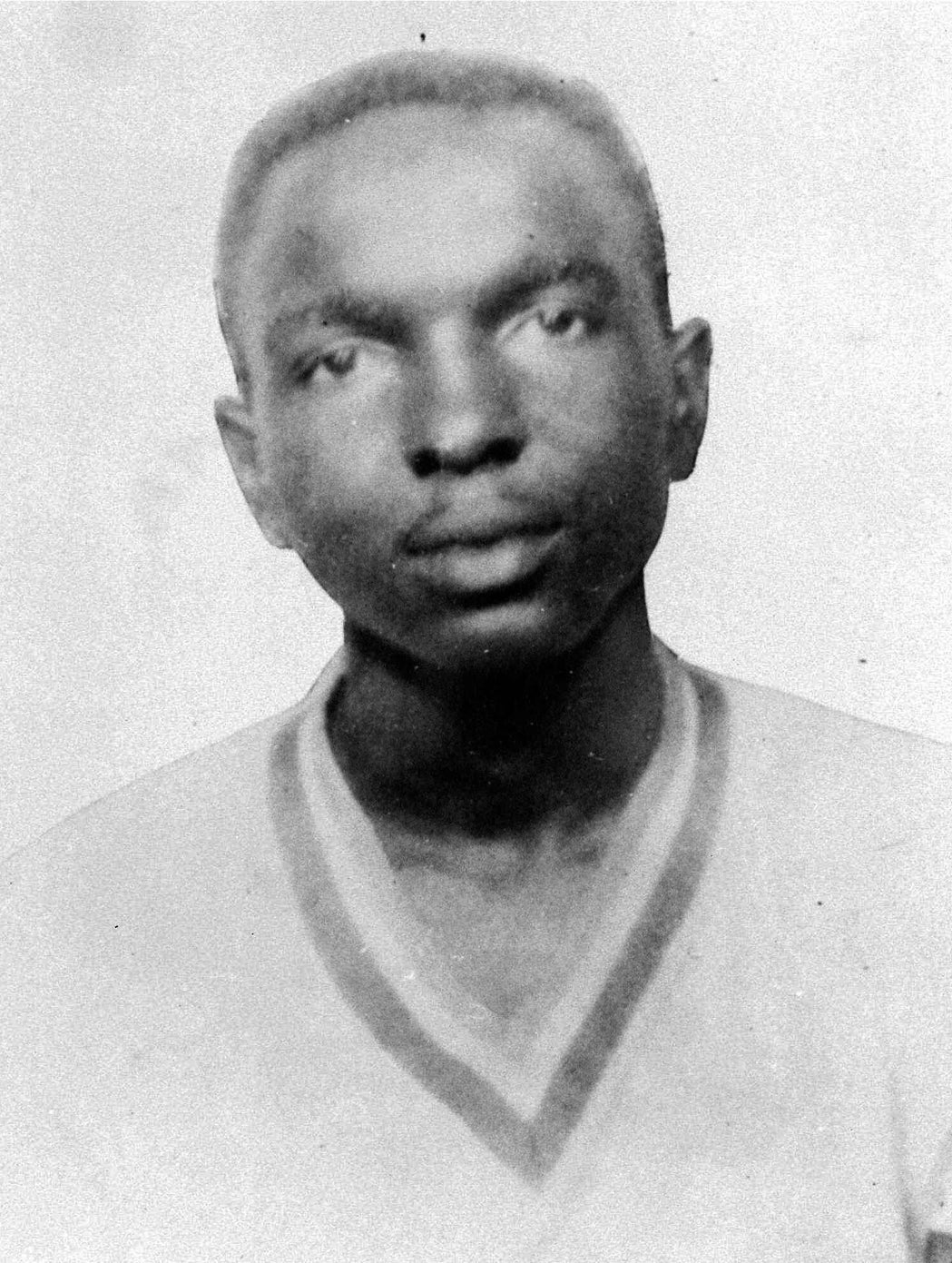
- Portrait of Chaney
- Born: James Earl Chaney; May 30, 1943; Meridian, Mississippi, U.S.
- Died: June 21, 1964 (aged 21); Philadelphia, Mississippi, U.S.
- Cause of death: Murder (gunshot wounds)
- Awards: Presidential Medal of Freedom (posthumous, 2014)

James Earl Chaney (May 30, 1943 – June 21, 1964) was an American civil rights activist. He was one of three civil rights workers murdered in Philadelphia, Mississippi, by members of the Ku Klux Klan on June 21, 1964. The others were Andrew Goodman and Michael Schwerner from New York City.

== Early life ==
James Earl Chaney was born on May 30, 1943, in Meridian, Mississippi, the eldest son of Fannie Lee and Ben Chaney Sr. His brother Ben was nine years younger, born in 1952. He also had three sisters, Barbara, Janice, and Julia. His parents separated for a time when James was young.

James attended Catholic school for the first nine grades, and was a member of St Joseph Catholic Church in Meridian, Mississippi.

At the age of 15 as a high school student, he and some of his classmates began wearing paper badges reading "NAACP", to mark their support for the national civil rights organization, the National Association for the Advancement of Colored People, founded in 1909. They were suspended for a week from the segregated high school, because the principal feared the reaction of the all-white school board.

After high school, Chaney started as a plasterer's apprentice in a trade union.

== Civil rights work ==
In 1962, Chaney participated in a Freedom Ride from Tennessee to Greenville, Mississippi, and in another from Greenville to Meridian. He and his younger brother participated in other nonviolent demonstrations, as well. James Chaney started volunteering in late 1963, and joined the Congress of Racial Equality (CORE) in Meridian. He organized voter education classes, introduced CORE workers to local church leaders, and helped CORE workers get around the counties,

In 1964, he met with leaders of the Mt. Nebo Baptist Church to gain their support for letting Michael Schwerner, CORE's local leader, come to address the church members, to encourage them to use the church for voter education and registration. Chaney also acted as a liaison with other CORE members.

== Murder ==
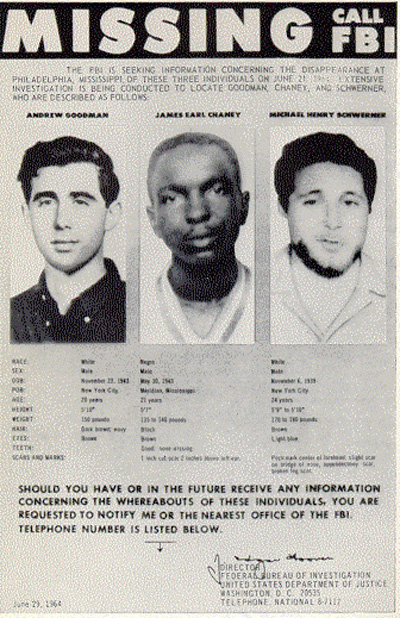
Missing persons poster created by the FBI in 1964, shows the photographs of Andrew Goodman, James Chaney, and Michael Schwerner.

On June 21, 1964, Chaney and fellow civil rights workers Michael Schwerner and Andrew Goodman were killed near the town of Philadelphia, Mississippi. They were investigating the burning of Mt. Zion Methodist Church, which had been a site for a CORE Freedom School. In the wake of Schwerner and Chaney's voter registration rallies, parishioners had been beaten by Ku Klux Klan members. They accused the sheriff's deputy, Cecil Price, of stopping their caravan and forcing the deacons to kneel in the headlights of their own cars, while white men beat them with rifle butts. The same klansmen who beat them were also identified as having burned the church.

Price arrested Chaney, Goodman, and Schwerner for an alleged traffic violation and took them to the Neshoba County jail. They were released that evening, without being allowed to telephone anyone. On the way back to Meridian, they were stopped by patrol lights and two carloads of Ku Klux Klan members on Highway 19, then taken in Price's car to another remote rural road. The men approached then shot and killed Schwerner, then Goodman, both with one shot in the heart and finally Chaney with three shots, after severely beating him. They buried the young men in an earthen dam nearby.

The men's bodies remained undiscovered for 44 days. The FBI was brought into the case by John Doar, the Department of Justice representative in Mississippi monitoring the situation during Freedom Summer. The missing civil rights workers became a major national story, especially coming on top of other events as civil rights workers were active across Mississippi in a voter registration drive.

Schwerner's widow Rita, who also worked for CORE in Meridian, expressed indignation that the press had ignored previous murders and disappearances of blacks in the area, but had highlighted this case because two white men from New York had gone missing. She said she believed that if only Chaney were missing, the case would not have received nearly as much attention.

== Aftermath for family ==
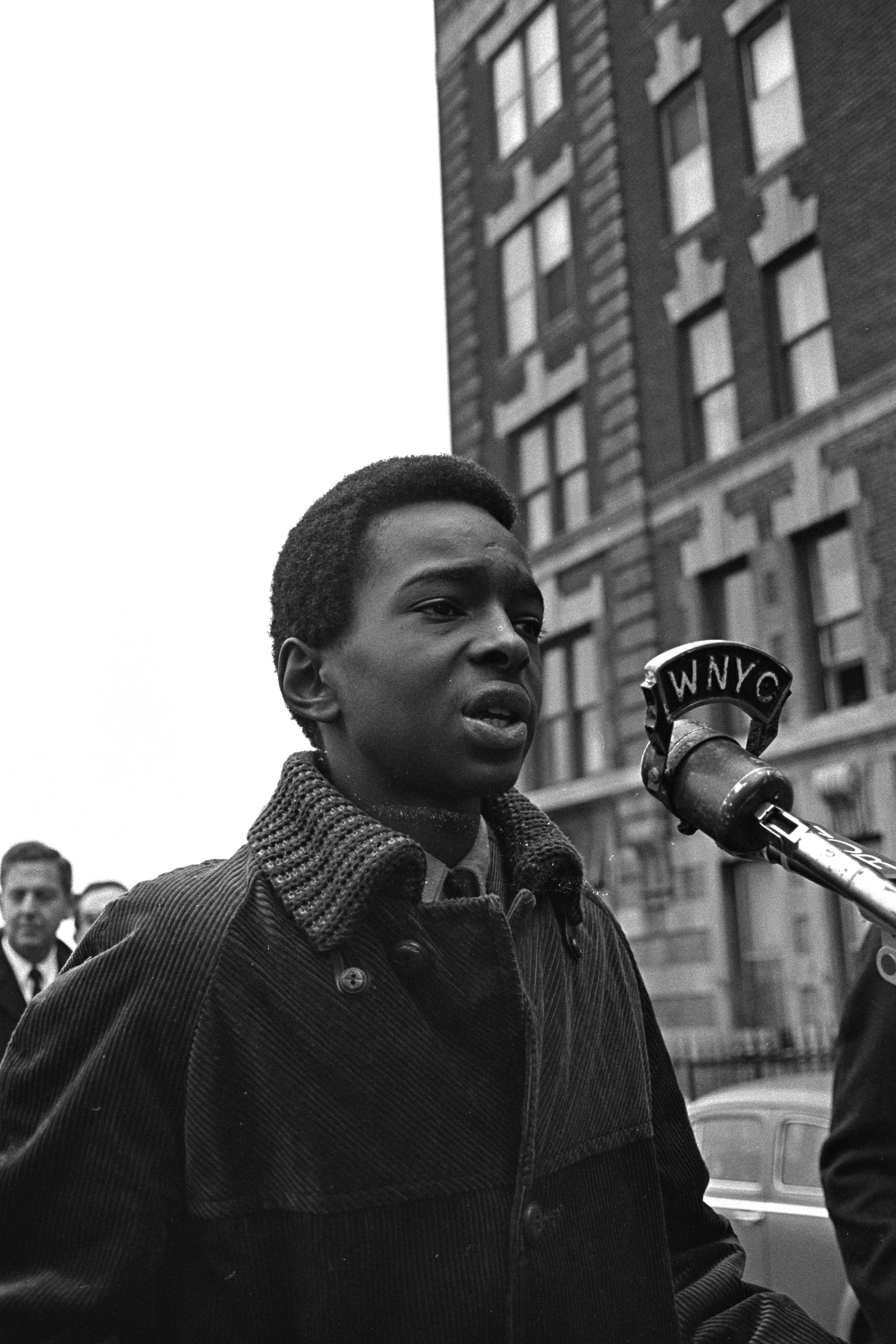
Chaney's brother Ben at the 1967 dedication of Freedom Place in Manhattan, which was named for Chaney, Goodman, and Schwerner

After the funeral of their older son, the Chaneys left Mississippi because of death threats. Helped by the Goodman and Schwerner families, and other supporters, they moved to New York City, where Chaney's younger brother Ben attended a private, majority-white high school.

In 1969, Ben joined the Black Panther Party and Black Liberation Army. In 1970, he went to Florida with two friends to buy guns; the two friends killed three white men in South Carolina and Florida. Chaney was acquitted of murder in South Carolina, but found guilty of three counts of first degree murder in Florida under the felony murder rule. Chaney served 13 years and, after gaining parole, founded the James Earl Chaney Foundation in his brother's honor. Starting in 1985, he worked "as a legal clerk for the [late] former U.S. Attorney General Ramsey Clark, the lawyer who secured his parole".

== Federal trial ==
In 1967, the US government went to trial, charging ten men with conspiracy to deprive the three murdered men of their civil rights under the Enforcement Act of 1870, the only federal law then applying to the case. The jury convicted seven men, including Deputy Sheriff Price, and three were acquitted, including Edgar Ray Killen, the former Ku Klux Klan organizer who had planned and directed the murders.

== State investigation ==
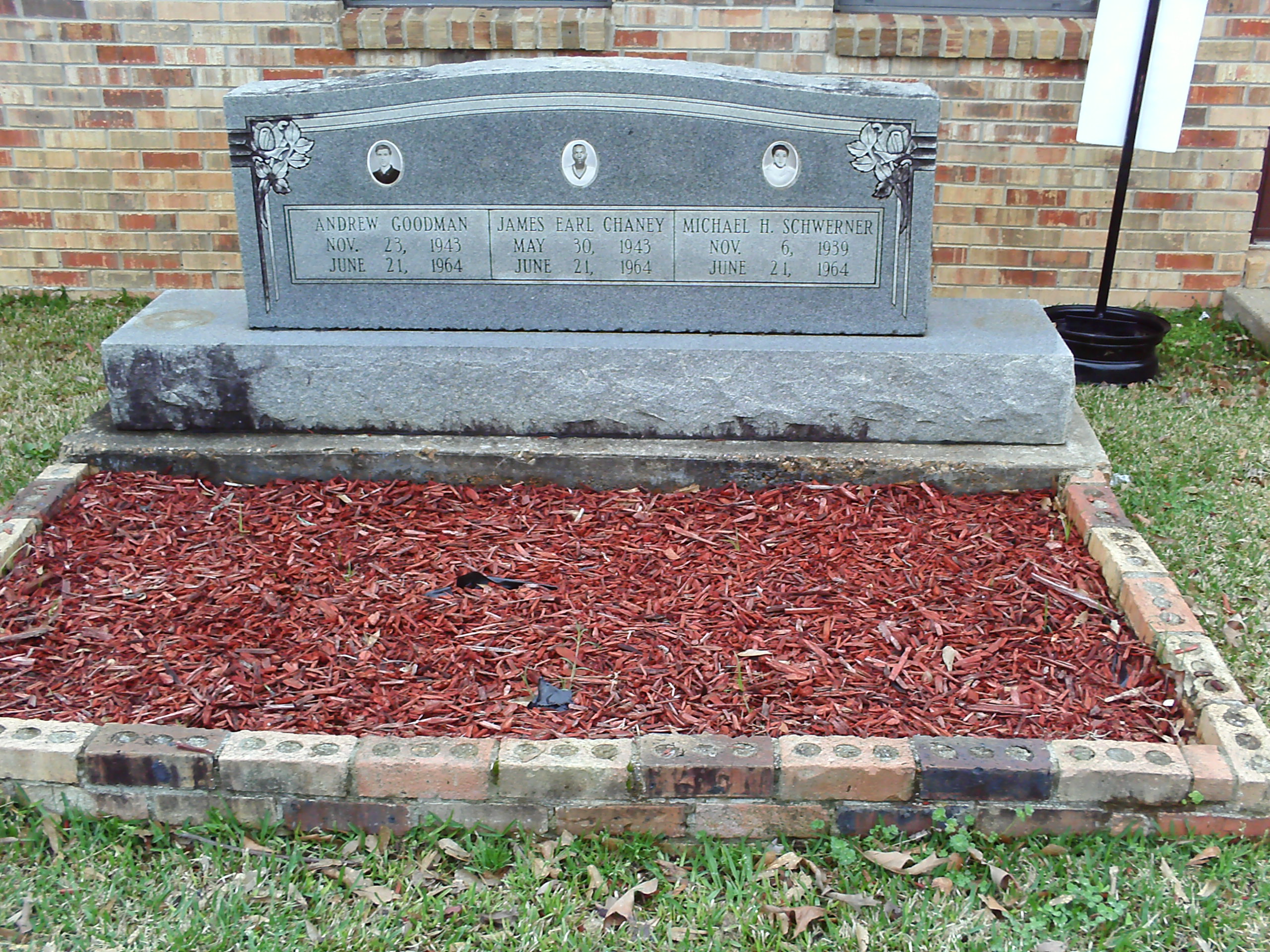
A memorial to Andrew Goodman, James Earl Chaney, and Michael H. Schwerner at Mt. Nebo Missionary Baptist Church in Philadelphia, Mississippi.

Over the years, activists had called for the state to prosecute the murderers. The journalist Jerry Mitchell, an award-winning investigative reporter for the Jackson Clarion-Ledger, had discovered new evidence and written extensively about the case for six years. Mitchell had earned renown for helping secure convictions in several other high-profile Civil Rights Era murder cases, including the assassination of Medgar Evers in Jackson, Mississippi, the 16th Street Baptist Church bombing in Birmingham, Alabama, and the murder of Vernon Dahmer in his Mississippi home. He developed new evidence about the civil rights murders, found new witnesses, and pressured the State to prosecute. It began an investigation in the early years of the 2000s.

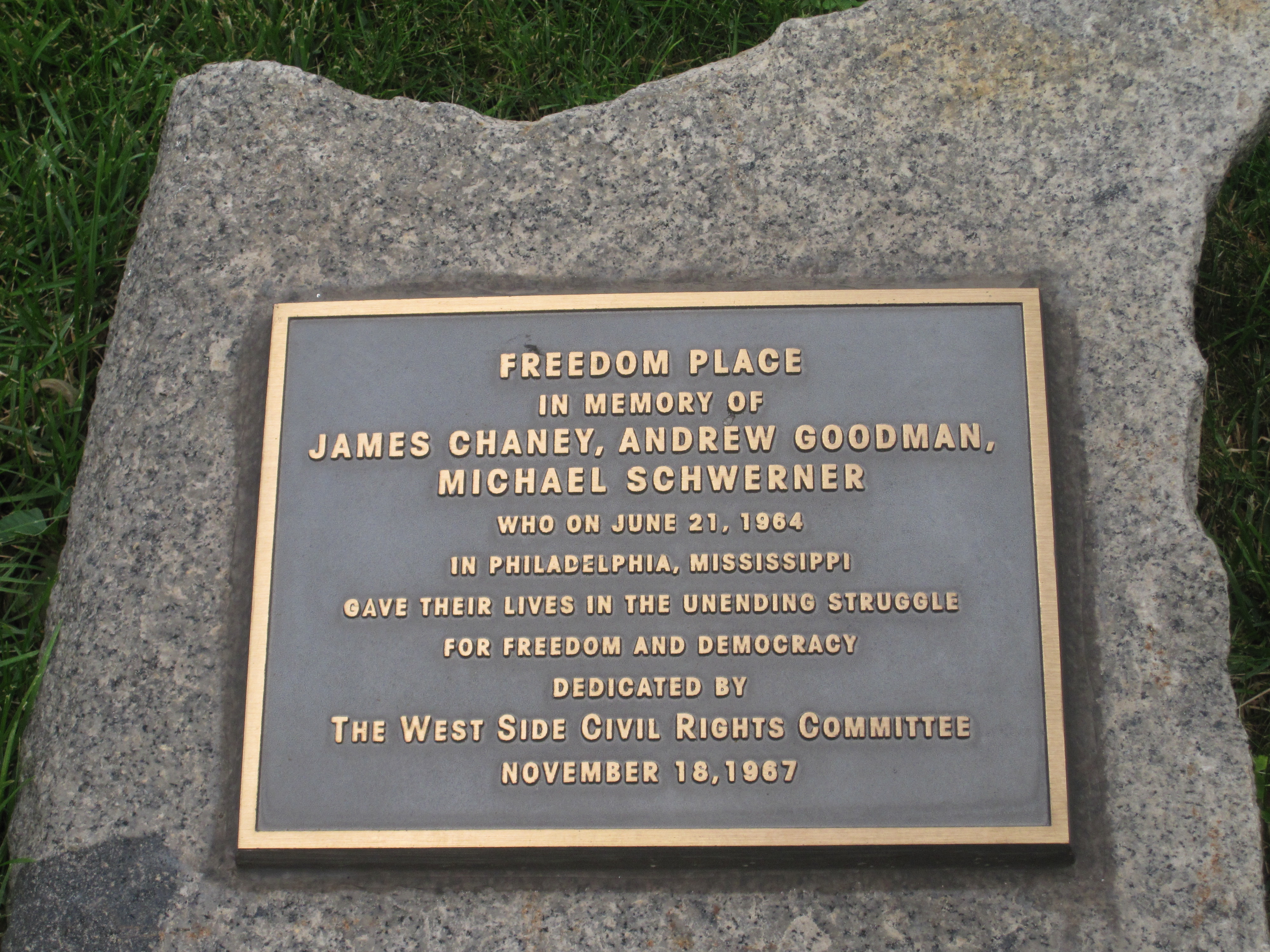
Marker near 70th Street/Freedom Place near Riverside Boulevard in New York City commemorating the three civil rights activists murdered in Mississippi in 1964

In 2004, Barry Bradford, an Illinois high school teacher, and his three students, Allison Nichols, Sarah Siegel, and Brittany Saltiel, joined Mitchell's efforts in a special project. They conducted additional research and created a documentary about their work. Their documentary, produced for the National History Day contest, presented important new evidence and compelling reasons for reopening the case. They obtained a taped interview with Edgar Ray Killen, who had been acquitted in the first trial. He had been an outspoken white supremacist nicknamed the "Preacher". The interview helped convince the State to reopen an investigation into the murders.

In 2005, the state charged Killen in the murders of the three activists; he was the only one of six living suspects to be charged. When the trial opened on January 7, 2005, Killen pleaded "Not guilty". Evidence was presented that he had supervised the murders. Not sure that Killen intended in advance for the activists to be killed by the Klan, the jury found him guilty of three counts of manslaughter on June 20, 2005, and he was sentenced to 60 years in prison—20 years for each count, to be served consecutively.

Believing there are other men involved in his brother's death who should be charged as accomplices to murder, as Killen was, Ben Chaney has said: "I'm not as sad as I was. But I'm still angry".

== Legacy and honors ==
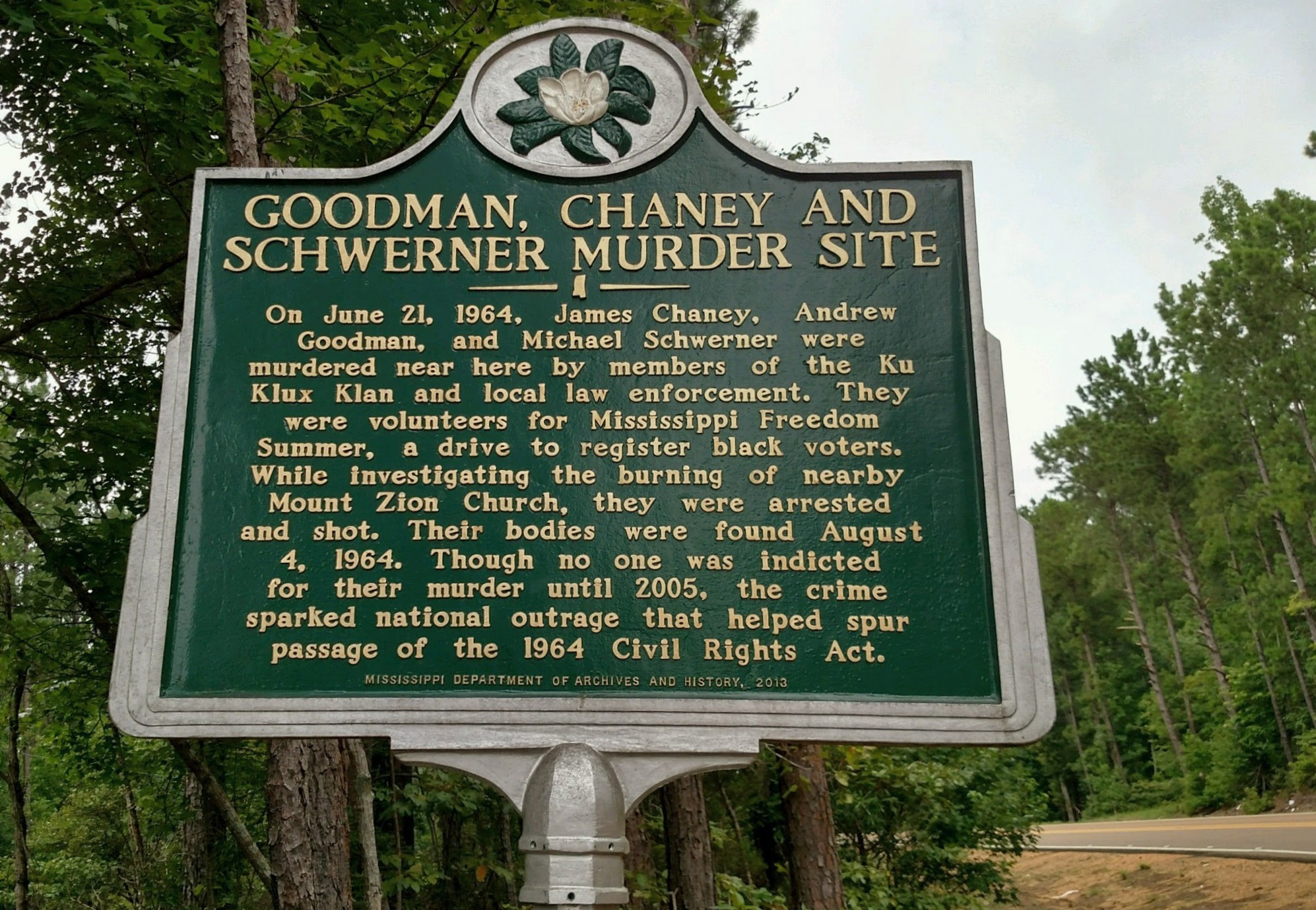
State of Mississippi roadside marker denoting the location where the 1964 murders of American civil rights workers Goodman, Chaney, and Schwerner took place

- In 1998, Ben Chaney established the James Earl Chaney Foundation in his older brother's honor, to promote the work of civil rights and social justice.
- Chaney, along with Goodman and Schwerner, received a posthumous Presidential Medal of Freedom from President Barack Obama in 2014.
- James Chaney Drive in Meridian, MS is named in his honor.

== Cultural references ==
The murders of James Chaney, Michael Schwerner, and Andrew Goodman outside of Philadelphia, Mississippi, being pivotal to the events of the Freedom Summer and the Civil Rights Movement as a whole, is referred to in Alice Walker's Meridian, which was published in 1976. It is referred to as being a deciding factor for not just the SNCC movement within the state of Mississippi, but for main characters Truman and Lynne to settle on going to Mississippi to further advocate for the movement. It was considered "the worst place in America for black people" (Walker, 136) at this time, and as such required extensive effort to improve. Alice Walker's Meridian, while following fictional characters, refers to key moments of the Civil Rights protests such as this for context and clarity.
