= Meridian micropolitan area =

Meridian, Mississippi Area
- Micropolitan Statistical Area
- Meridian, MS Micropolitan Statistical Area
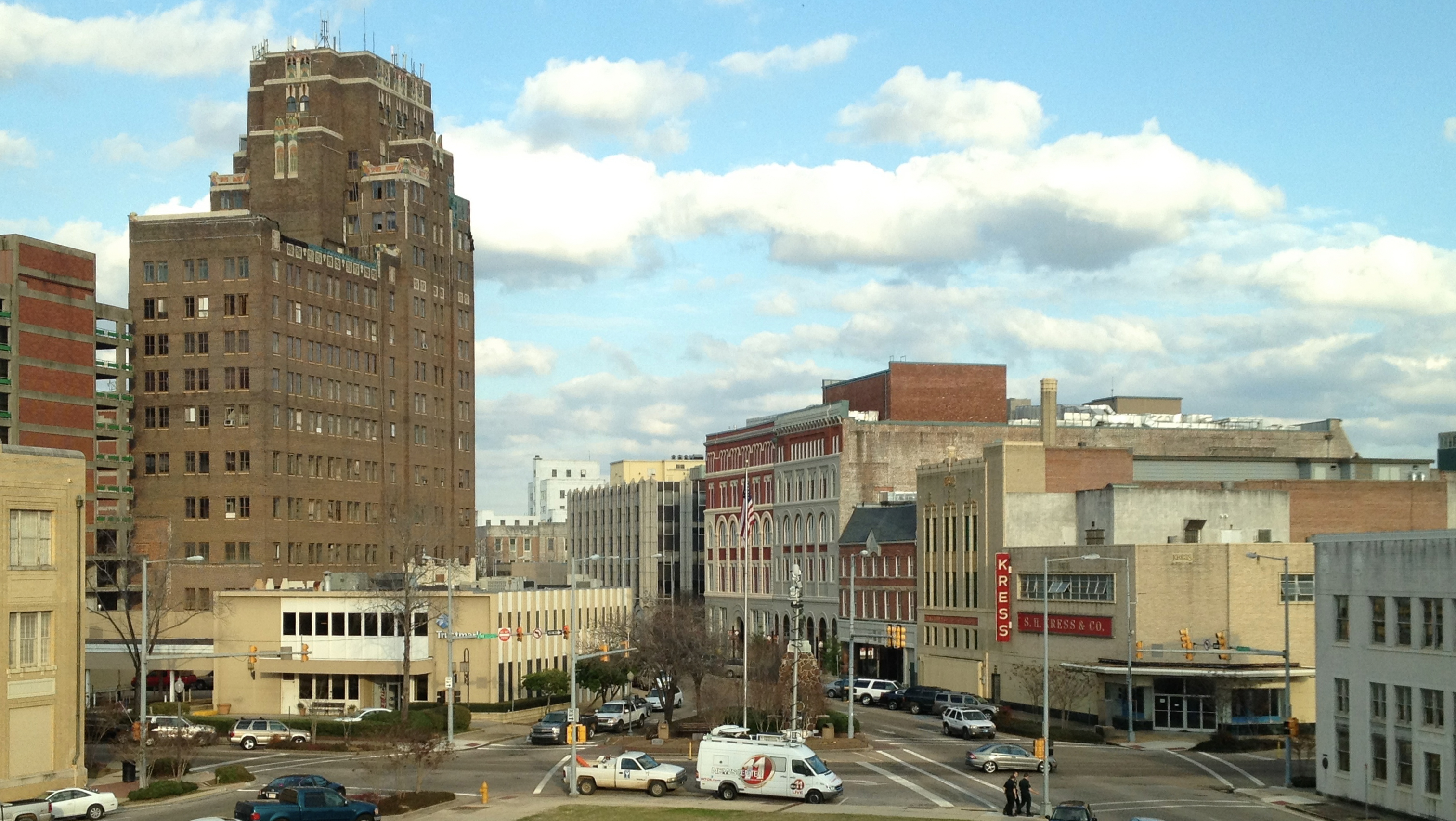
- A view of downtown from the third floor of Meridian City Hall; the 16-story Threefoot Building dominates the skyline
Interactive Map of Meridian, MS μSA
City of Meridian
Meridian, MS μSA
- Country: United States
- State: Mississippi
- Principal city: Meridian
- Time zone: UTC-6 (CST)
  - Summer (DST): UTC-5 (CDT)

The Meridian Micropolitan Statistical Area is a micropolitan area in east central Mississippi that covers three counties - Clarke, Kemper and Lauderdale. As of the 2020 census, the μSA had a population of 97,587.

== Counties ==
- Clarke
- Kemper
- Lauderdale

== Communities ==
=== Cities ===
- Meridian (Principal City)
- Quitman

=== Towns ===
- De Kalb
- Enterprise
- Marion
- Pachuta
- Shubuta
- Stonewall

=== Census-designated places ===
- Bogue Chitto
- Collinsville
- Meridian Station
- Nellieburg
- Porterville

=== Unincorporated places ===
- Bailey
- Cullum
- Daleville
- De Soto
- Electric Mills
- Giles
- Kewanee
- Lauderdale
- Moscow
- Porterville
- Preston
- Russell
- Sucarnoochee
- Suqualena
- Tamola
- Toomsuba
- Wahalak
- Whynot
- Zero

== Demographics ==
As of the 2020 Census, there were 97,587 people residing within the μSA. The racial makeup of the μSA consisted of 49,296 White persons, 42,569 African Americans, 577 Native Americans, 585 Asians, 35 Pacific Islanders, 2,537 individuals from other races, and Hispanic or Latino of any race were numbered at 1,988.

== See also ==
- List of metropolitan areas in Mississippi
- List of micropolitan areas in Mississippi
- List of cities in Mississippi
- List of towns and villages in Mississippi
- List of census-designated places in Mississippi
- List of United States metropolitan areas
