= National Register of Historic Places listings in Kemper County, Mississippi =

Location of Kemper County in Mississippi

This is a list of the National Register of Historic Places listings in Kemper County, Mississippi.

This is intended to be a complete list of the properties and districts on the National Register of Historic Places in Kemper County, Mississippi, United States. Latitude and longitude coordinates are provided for many National Register properties and districts; these locations may be seen together in a map.

There are 6 properties and districts listed on the National Register in the county.

This National Park Service list is complete through NPS recent listings posted October 23, 2026.

== Current listings ==
	Name on the Register	Image	Date listed	Location	City or town	Description
1	Kemper County Hospital, (Old)		February 23, 2026 (#100012731)	14632 Highway 39 North; 32°46′39″N 88°39′26″W	DeKalb	
2	Oliver House	Oliver House	October 31, 1985 (#85003439)	7984 Old Jackson Rd. 32°42′06″N 88°48′53″W	Moscow	Constructed c. 1885
3	Perkins House	Perkins House	June 24, 1994 (#94000643)	2651 Townsend Rd. 32°46′51″N 88°34′46″W	DeKalb	Constructed c. 1870. Originally located on Murphy Hardy Rd., northwest of its junction with Mississippi Highway 493 (32°42′39″N 88°49′27″W); moved to current location in 2012. After the move, the property was relisted on the Register on May 17, 2016.
4	Porterville General Store	Porterville General Store	March 17, 2006 (#06000195)	Old U.S. Highway 45; 32°41′17″N 88°28′18″W	Porterville	
5	Sucarnoochee River Fishweir	Sucarnoochee River Fishweir	March 10, 2010 (#10000065)	Address restricted	Porterville	
6	Zion Baptist Church	Zion Baptist Church	December 12, 2002 (#02001497)	2243 W. Zion Rd. 32°36′32″N 88°52′53″W	Collinsville	Constructed 1910

== See also ==
- List of National Historic Landmarks in Mississippi
- National Register of Historic Places listings in Mississippi
