= Mississippi Highway 498 =

State highway in Mississippi, United States

Mississippi Highway 498
- MS 498 highlighted in orange; former section in purple

Route information
- Maintained by MDOT
- Length: 1 mi (1.6 km)
- Existed: c. 1957–present

Major junctions
- West end: US 45 near Porterville
- East end: Porterville–Alabama Road near Porterville

Location
- Country: United States
- State: Mississippi
- Counties: Kemper

Highway system
- Mississippi State Highway System; Interstate; US; State
← MS 496	→ MS 500

Mississippi Highway 498 (MS 498) is a state highway in eastern Mississippi. The highway starts at U.S. Route 45 (US 45) near Porterville, and it travels eastward from its western terminus. One mile (1.6 km) later, MS 498 ends near a railroad crossing west of Porterville, and the road continues as Porterville–Alabama Road. The route was designated around 1957, from US 45 to the Alabama–Mississippi state line. MS 498 was truncated to Porterville by 1970.

== Route description ==
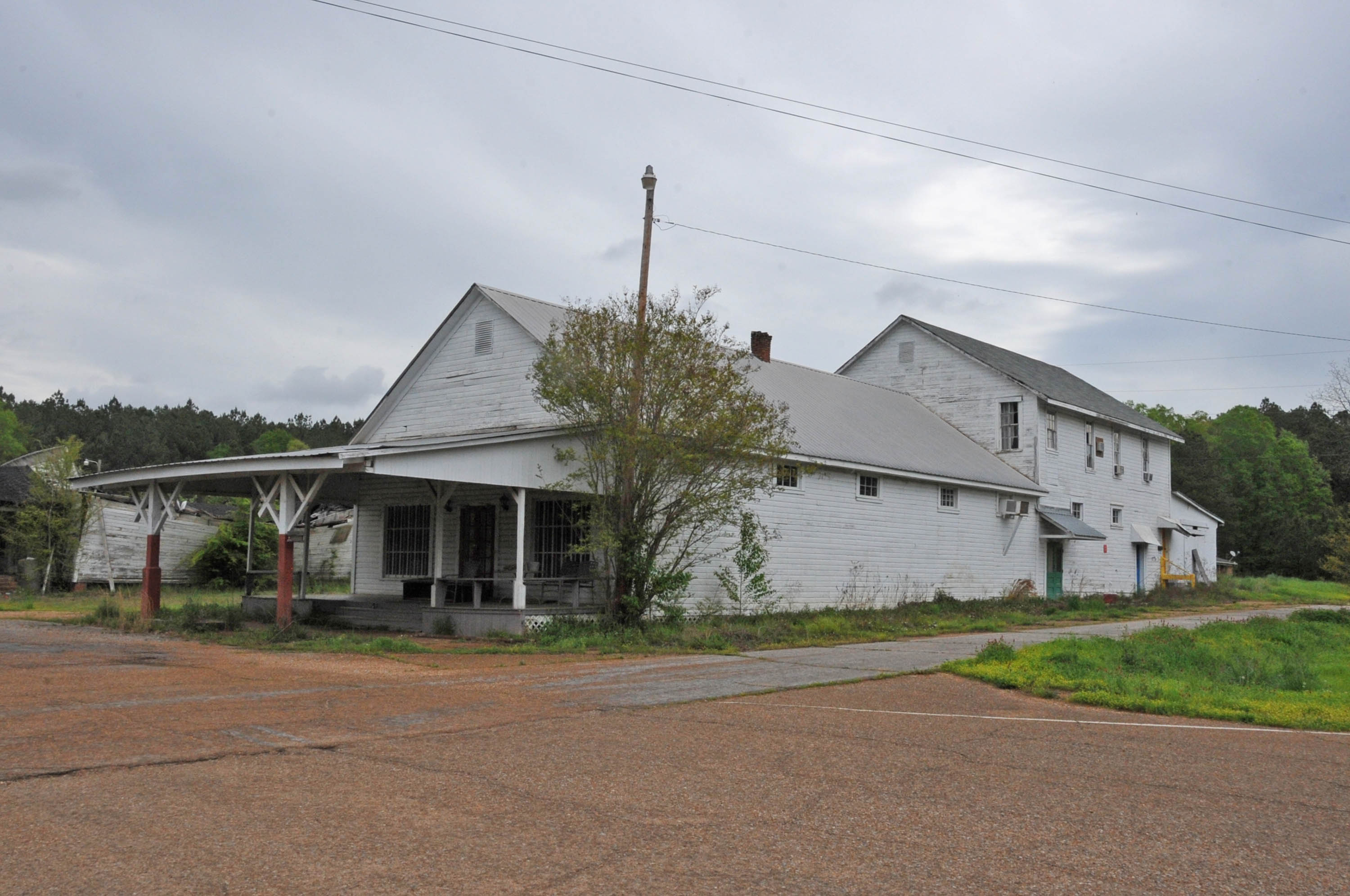
Porterville General Store, located near MS 498

All of MS 498 is located in southeastern Kemper County. In 2017, the Mississippi Department of Transportation (MDOT) calculated 370 vehicles traveling on MS 498 east of Dan Whitsett Road on average each day. The route is legally defined in Mississippi Code § 65-3-3, and it is maintained by MDOT as part of the Mississippi State Highway System.

The highway starts at the intersection of US 45 and Dekalb–Porterville Road, also known as Fire Tower Road. MS 498 travels eastward from the intersection, then east-northeast to Dan Whitsett Road inside a forested area. Afterwards, the road continues eastward and crosses over a small ditch. Around 1,000 feet (300 m) later, MS 498 crosses over the Sucarnoochee River. State maintenance ends several yards before a crossing over a railroad operated Kansas City Southern Railway. The road crosses over the railroad and it continues through Porterville as Porterville–Alabama Road. The Porterville General Store is located near the eastern terminus. Past the unincorporated area, the road continues southeastwards to the Alabama–Mississippi state line, and it becomes Sumter County Road 12 in Alabama.

== History ==
Around 1957, MS 498 was constructed as a gravel road from US 45 near Porterville to the Alabama–Mississippi state line. By 1962, the section from US 45 to Porterville was paved in asphalt. The remaining section east of Porterville was removed from the state highway system by 1970.

== Major intersections ==
The entire route is in Kemper County.

Location	mi	km	Destinations	Notes
	0.000	0.000	US 45 – Scooba, Columbus, Meridian	Western terminus
Porterville	1.000	1.609	Porterville–Alabama Road	Eastern terminus
1.000 mi = 1.609 km; 1.000 km = 0.621 mi
