= Kevin Granger =

American basketball player (born 1973)

Personal information
- Born: December 30, 1973 (age 52) Kemper County, Mississippi, U.S.
- Listed height: 6 ft 3 in (1.91 m)
- Listed weight: 180 lb (82 kg)

Career information
- High school: Kemper County (DeKalb, Mississippi)
- College: Texas Southern (1992–1996)
- NBA draft: 1996: undrafted
- Playing career: 1996–1999
- Position: Point guard
- Number: 10

Career highlights
- 2× Black College All-American (1995, 1996); NCAA scoring champion (1996)

Kevin Granger (born December 30, 1973) is a retired American professional basketball player who is best known for leading NCAA Division I in scoring with a 27.0 points per game average in 1995–96.

Granger grew up in Scooba, Mississippi and attended Kemper County High School (KCHS). He earned First Team All-District, First Team All-State and All-America honors after leading KCHS to the 3-A State Championship. Granger then attended Texas Southern University and became a four-year starter on the varsity basketball team while playing the point guard position. By the time he graduated in 1996 he had established himself as one of the school's all-time leaders in points, assists (467) and steals (146). Granger was named the Southwestern Athletic Conference Freshman of the Year, 1994 SWAC Tournament MVP, and was a two-time First Team All-SWAC and Black College All-American selection.

He did not get selected in the 1996 NBA draft so Granger took his game overseas. In three professional seasons, he played in Cyprus, Argentina (Regatas Corrientes) and Italy (Floor Padova). Upon returning to the United States, Granger became a high school basketball coach and special education teacher at Worthing High School in Houston, Texas. He left the school to become an assistant coach at his alma mater with the promise of becoming the new head coach once interim coach Robert Moreland resigned. Granger and TSU had entered a gentleman's agreement, but once TSU's old athletic director was fired by the school president, he was never given the opportunity to become the head coach and filed a lawsuit in response. Granger married his college sweetheart, Tracy, who was also a Texas Southern cheerleader, and they have three children together.

== See also ==
- List of NCAA Division I men's basketball season scoring leaders
