= Minden, Mississippi =

- Ghost town
- Location in Mississippi and the United States Minden (the United States)
- Coordinates: 32°34′54″N 88°24′57″W
- Country: United States
- State: Mississippi
- County: Kemper
- Time zone: UTC-6 (Central (CST))
  - Summer (DST): UTC-5 (CDT)

Minden is a ghost town in Kemper County, Mississippi. It possessed a post office from 1898 to 1915.

== History ==
The settlement was described in 1907 as being situated along Lost Horse Creek in southeastern Kemper County, approximately 18 miles (29 km) from De Kalb and 4 miles (6.4 km) east of the Mobile & Ohio Railroad.
