= Wild Horse Creek =

Wild Horse Creek or Wildhorse Creek may refer to:

- Wild Horse Creek (Solano County) in California
- Wild Horse Creek (Colorado)
- Wild Horse Creek (Mississippi)
- Wildhorse Creek (Oklahoma)
- Wildhorse Creek (Alvord Lake) in Oregon
- Wildhorse Creek (Texas)
- Wild Horse Creek (Wyoming)
- Wild Horse River, formerly known as Wild Horse Creek, in British Columbia
