= John A. Clark =

American lawyer and politician (1883-1950)

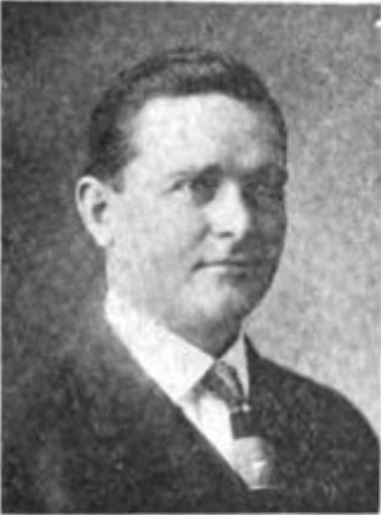
- Clark c. 1917

Member of the Mississippi State Senate from the 15th district
- In office January 1928 – January 1936
- In office January 1916 – January 1920

Personal details
- Born: John Archibald Clark; August 24, 1883 Pea Ridge, Mississippi
- Died: February 26, 1940 (aged 56) Jackson, Mississippi
- Party: Democratic
- Spouse: Tillie Tann (m. 1904)

John Archibald Clark (August 24, 1883 - February 26, 1950) was an American lawyer and Democratic politician. He was a member of the Mississippi State Senate from 1916 to 1920 and from 1928 to 1936.

== Early life ==
John Archibald Clark was born on August 24, 1883, in Pea Ridge, Kemper County, Mississippi. He was the son of Alexander John Clark, a South Carolina native, and Frances Jane (Henson) Clark. Clark attended the high schools of Cleveland, Mississippi, and then the Cooper Institute in Daleyville, Mississippi. Clark graduated from Millsaps College of Law in 1903 and was admitted to the bar. He then moved to DeKalb, Mississippi, to practice law.

== Professional career ==
From 1913 to 1915, Clark was a member of the Board of Aldermen and the City Attorney of DeKalb. Also in 1915, Clark was the attorney for the Board of Supervisors of Kemper County, Mississippi. In 1915, Clark was elected to represent the 15th district in the Mississippi State Senate and served from 1916 to 1920. He served again the Senate from 1928 to 1936, and then retired due to poor health.

== Personal life ==
Clark was a member of the Methodist Church. He also belonged to the Masonic Order and the Columbian Woodsmen. He married Matilda "Tillie" Tann on October 23, 1904. They had one daughter, named Helen Alexandra Clark.

Clark died on February 26, 1940, in a hospital in Jackson, Mississippi. Clark's widow represented Kemper County in the Mississippi House of Representatives from 1940 to 1944.
