= Sucarnoochee =

Sucarnoochee may refer to:

- Sucarnoochee, Mississippi, a community in Kemper County, Mississippi
- Sucarnoochee River, a river in Kemper County, Mississippi and Sumter County, Alabama
