= Binnsville, Mississippi =

- Ghost town
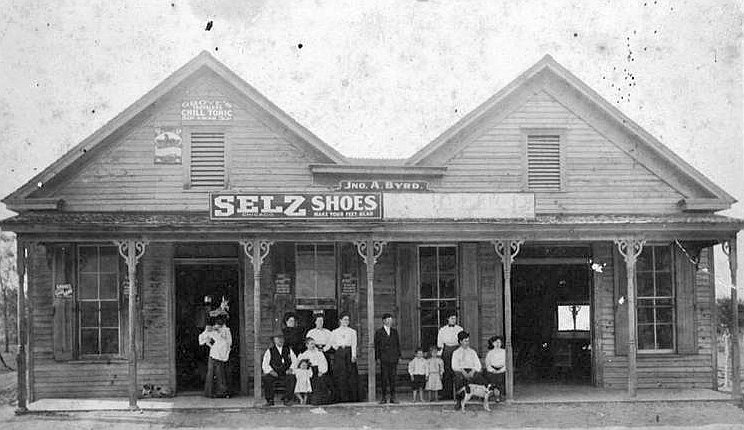
- John A. Byrd store in Binnsville, circa 1905

- Location in Mississippi and the United States Binnsville (the United States)
- Coordinates: 32°54′47″N 88°22′58″W
- Country: United States
- State: Mississippi
- County: Kemper
- Elevation: 236 ft (72 m)
- Time zone: UTC-6 (Central (CST))
  - Summer (DST): UTC-5 (CDT)
- GNIS feature ID: 691705

Binnsville (variant name Binnville) is a ghost town in Kemper County, Mississippi, United States.

== History ==
The earliest record of settlement was the Chapman (or Chatam) Church, organized about 1840. It was later known as the Prairie Church, and then the Binnsville United Methodist Church, rebuilt in 1974.

The settlement's namesake, George Binn, located to the area in the 1870s and opened a store with a post office.

Binnsville was the center of a rich farming region, with access to a riverboat port on the Noxubee River about 1.5 mi (2.4 km) north.

By the late 1800s, Binnsville's population had grown to approximately 500, and it was described as "a bustling town" and "a thriving and prosperous community". The settlement had as many as 16 stores, a post office, two drug stores, three churches, a Masonic Grand Lodge, a cotton gin and a grist mill. Binnsville Cemetery was located south of the settlement.

In 1886, the Mississippi Legislature passed a law stating that "no intoxicating liquors shall be sold or given away within one mile of Chapman Church, situated at Binnsville".

Fairview Male and Female College, a segregated white facility, was established in Binnsville in 1887, and featured dormitories for both sexes. Described as "a school of more than local reputation", it had an enrollment of 150 in 1892, and was the first co-educational school in Kemper County. A noted graduate was Alabama Senator John H. Pinson. The school closed in 1904.

== Decline ==
The area became isolated when the state abandoned dredging operations on the Noxubee River, reducing riverboat access.

The town gradually moved 6 mi (9.7 km) southwest and became part of the Scooba community, which was located on the Gulf, Mobile and Ohio Railroad.

== Notable person ==
- Doc Land, former Major League Baseball outfielder
