= Wild horse (disambiguation) =

Wild horse (Equus ferus) is a species of the genus Equus that includes domesticated and undomesticated subspecies.

- Przewalski's wild horse (Equus ferus przewalskii or Equus przewalskii), a rare and endangered subspecies of wild horse
- Eurasian wild horse (Equus ferus ferus), an extinct subspecies of wild horse
- Yukon wild horse (Equus lambei), an extinct horse species
- Feral horse, free-roaming descendants of domesticated horses

Wild horse or Wild horses may also refer to:

== Geography ==
- Wild Horse, Alberta, an unincorporated community in Alberta, Canada
- Wild Horse, British Columbia or Fisherville, site of an 1864 Gold Rush boomtown
- Wild Horse, Colorado, an unincorporated village in Colorado
- Wild Horse Desert
- Wildhorse Township, Graham County, Kansas, United States
- Wild Horse Valley AVA, a California wine region
- Wild Horse River, a tributary of the Kootenay River in British Columbia, Canada
- Wild Horse Creek (disambiguation)
- Wild Horse Butte, a butte of sedimentary rock in southeastern Utah
- Wildhorse Butte, a volcanic butte in Lincoln County, Idaho

=== Establishments ===
- Wildhorse Resort & Casino, a Native American casino in Oregon, United States
- Wildhorse Saloon, a dance club in Nashville, Tennessee, United States

== Books ==
- Wild Horses, a 1994 novel by Dick Francis
- Wild Horses (play), a 1952 farce by Ben Travers

== Film and television ==
- Wild Horse (1931 film), Western (genre) film starring Hoot Gibson
- Wild Horse (1983 film), a New Zealand film
- Wild Horses (1985 film), a TV movie starring Kenny Rogers and Pam Dawber
- Wild Horses (1995 film), Argentine film by Marcelo Piñeyro
- Wild Horses (2015 film), an American film by Robert Duvall
- "Wild Horses", the nineteenth episode of the anime series Cowboy Bebop
- Wild Horse Nine, a 2026 film by Martin McDonagh
  - Wild Horse Nine (soundtrack), the 2026 soundtrack to the film

== Music ==
=== Bands ===
- Wild Horses (American rock band), a band that originally featured Johnny Edwards and James Kottak
- Wild Horses (American country band), an American country music band
- Wild Horses (British band), a 1980s rock band

=== Albums ===
- Wild Horses (Wild Horses album), a 1980 album by the British band
- Wild Horses (Smokie album), a 1998 album by the English rock band Smokie
- WildHorse, a 2017 album by RaeLynn

=== Songs ===
- "Wild Horses" (Birdy song), a 2015 song by Birdy
- "Wild Horses" (Garth Brooks song), a 1990 song by Garth Brooks
- "Wild Horses" (Gino Vannelli song), a 1987 song by Gino Vannelli
- "Wild Horses" (Rolling Stones song), a 1971 song by the Rolling Stones
- "Wild Horses", 1953 pop song recorded by bandleader Ray Anthony and vocalist Jo Ann Greer
- "Wild Horses", a song by Natasha Bedingfield from the album Unwritten
- "Wild Horses", a song by Bishop Briggs from the album Bishop Briggs
- "Wild Horses", a song by Girls Aloud from the album Chemistry
- "Wild Horses", a song by Nik Kershaw from the album The Riddle
- "Wild Horses", a song by Prefab Sprout from the album Jordan: The Comeback
- "She Rides Wild Horses", a song from the album of the same name by Kenny Rogers

== See also ==
- Horse (disambiguation)
- Wild (disambiguation)
