= Zero, Mississippi =

- Unincorporated community
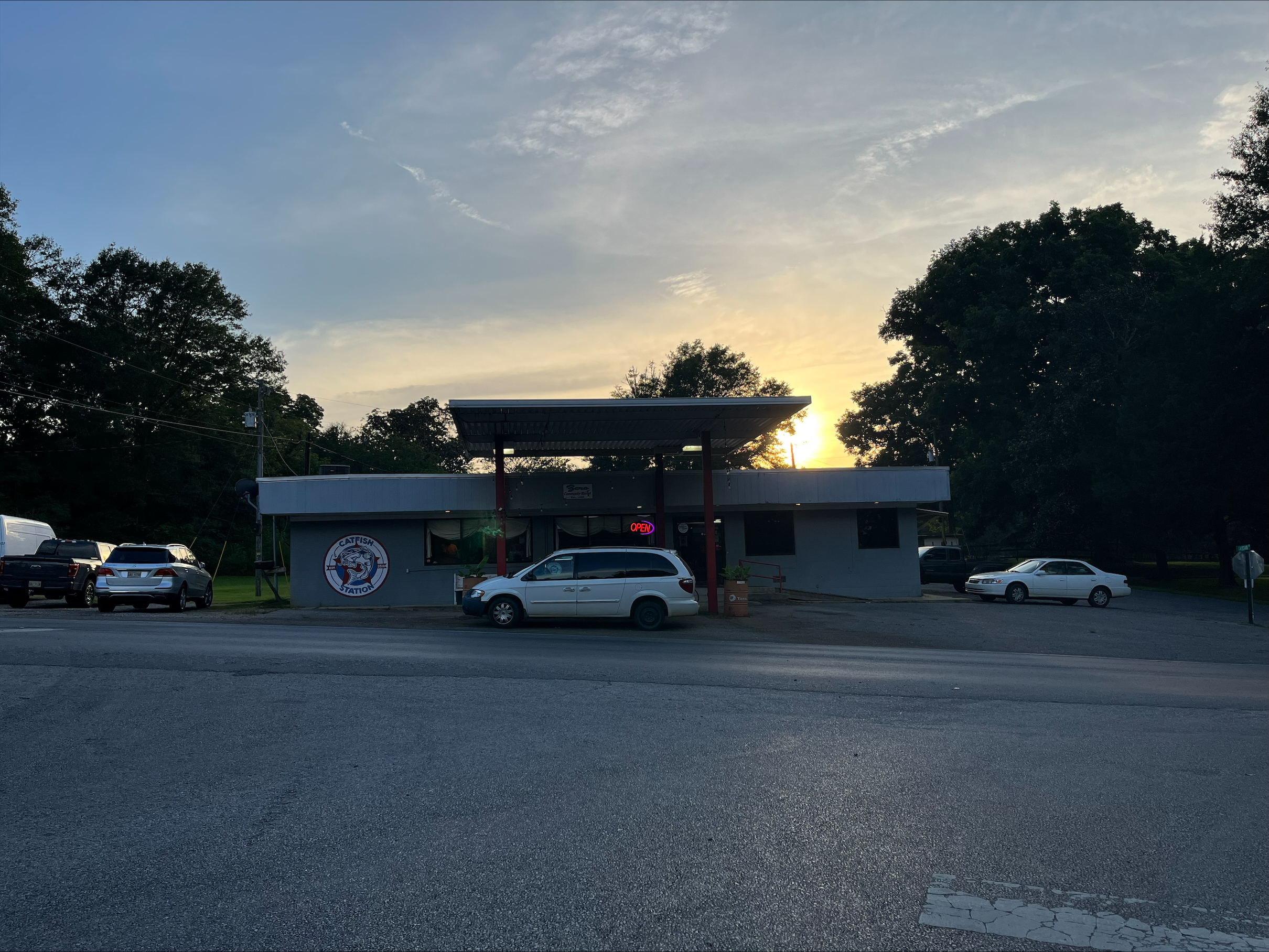
- Former Zero community store, now operating as a restaurant

- Location within Mississippi Location within the United States
- Coordinates: 32°18′01″N 88°39′02″W
- Country: United States
- State: Mississippi
- County: Lauderdale
- Elevation: 449 ft (137 m)
- Time zone: UTC-6 (Central (CST))
  - Summer (DST): UTC-5 (CDT)
- ZIP code: 39301
- Area code: 601
- GNIS feature ID: 692337

Zero is an unincorporated community located in central Lauderdale County, Mississippi, United States, located approximately 5.5 miles (8.9 km) southeast of Meridian near U.S. Route 45 and is part of Meridian, Mississippi Micropolitan Statistical Area.

== History ==
Zero was first known as "Pleasant Hill", and settlers were noted there as early as 1841.

In 1900, Zero had a population of fifty. Zero's post office was closed in 1905.

The Long Creek Volunteer Fire Department is located in Zero. A recreation center is also located there.
