= Lovie Gore =

American politician (1904–1980)

Member of the Mississippi House of Representatives
- In office January 8, 1952 – January 5, 1960

Personal details
- Born: Lovie Landrum; January 15, 1904 Sturgis, Mississippi, U.S.
- Died: February 7, 1980 (aged 76) Starkville, Mississippi, U.S.
- Party: Democratic

Lovie Landrum Gore (née Landrum; January 15, 1904 – February 7, 1980) was an American politician who served as a member of the Mississippi House of Representatives between 1952 and 1960. She was the Democratic national committeewoman for the state of Mississippi between 1956 and 1960. Gore was a vocal opponent of the civil rights movement, attempting to delay school integration in Mississippi and criticizing desegregation efforts from the national Democratic party.

== Early life ==
Lovie Landrum was born in Oktibbeha County, Mississippi, on January 15, 1904, and attended high school in Sturgis. Landrum married Fletcher Gore, who was elected to three terms in the Mississippi Legislature.

== Career ==
Gore was first elected to represent Oktibbeha County in the Mississippi House of Representatives in 1951, after winning a runoff election in the Democratic primary. She was one of five women elected to the 1952 legislature. During her first term, Gore introduced a bill to qualify women for jury service in Mississippi, an effort that she would pursue again in 1958 with state representative Betty Jane Long. She announced her intention to run for a second term in March 1955, and was the only female incumbent state representative to successfully seek re-election that year. In March 1956, she made multiple unsuccessful attempts to introduce a bill that would delay school integration by one year, arguing that her constituents did not have time to plan for the consolidations of schools.

She was elected as the state's Democratic national committeewoman at the Mississippi Democratic convention in July 1956, defeating incumbent national committeewoman Mrs. Hermes Gautier in a 155–122 vote. Her election was described as a "surprise development". She reluctantly supported the 1956 nomination of Adlai Stevenson and Estes Kefauver and decried the national party's stance on civil rights, writing that "neither I nor the people of Mississippi in my opinion will support or subscribe to the strong civil rights plank in the Democratic platform." In December 1958, she voted in support of a motion that demanded the resignation of a Louisiana national committeeman who had praised a national civil rights bill.

Gore began a campaign for the Mississippi State Senate in February 1959, seeking to represent the 23rd district (Oktibbeha and Choctaw counties). She led the first round of the Democratic primary on August 4, 1959, receiving 1582 votes, while law student Ben F. Hilbun Jr. received 1408 votes and Charles L. Barnett received 1328 votes. Because no candidate received a majority of the votes, a runoff election between Gore and Hilbun was held on August 25. Hilbun won the runoff with 55.7 percent of the vote, receiving 486 more votes than Gore. In January 1960, Gore announced that she would not seek re-election as Democratic national committeewoman, citing health issues. She was a pledged elector for the 1960 Kennedy–Johnson ticket and was part of the "loyalist" slate of Mississippi electors that year, opposite a slate of unpledged electors formed by rebel Democrats who sought concessions on civil rights. She was succeeded as Democratic national committeewoman by Alice Phillips.

== Death ==
Gore died on February 7, 1980, at Oktibbeha County Hospital. She was 76 years old.
