= USS Kemper County =

U.S. Navy's World War II ship

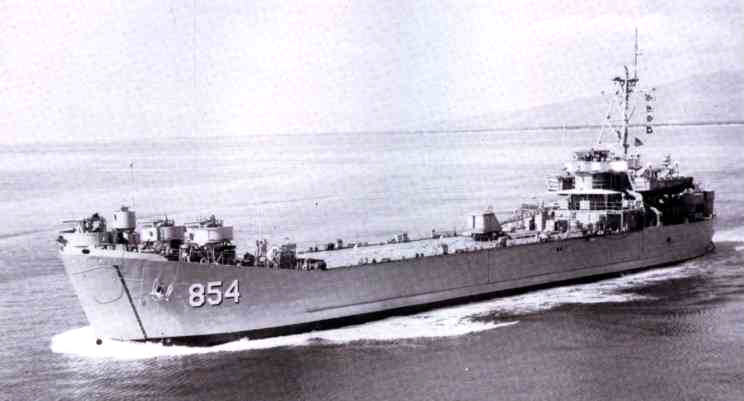
- USS Kemper County (LST-854) underway, date and place unknown

History

United States
- Name: USS LST-854
- Builder: Chicago Bridge & Iron Company, Seneca, Illinois
- Laid down: 30 August 1944
- Launched: 20 November 1944
- Commissioned: 14 December 1944
- Decommissioned: 21 October 1949
- Recommissioned: 20 November 1950
- Decommissioned: 28 May 1969
- Renamed: USS Kemper County (LST-854), 1 July 1955
- Honours and awards: 1 battle star (World War II); 5 battle stars (Korea); 6 campaign stars, Navy Unit Commendation (Vietnam)
- Fate: Transferred to Barbados, July 1975

Barbados
- Name: Northpoint
- Acquired: July 1975
- Fate: Sold to Panama (c. early-1980s)

Panama
- Name: El Gato Blanco
- Acquired: (early-1980s)
- Fate: Unknown

General characteristics
- Class & type: LST-542-class tank landing ship
- Displacement: 1,490 long tons (1,514 t) light; 3,640 long tons (3,698 t) full
- Length: 328 ft (100 m)
- Beam: 50 ft (15 m)
- Draft: Unloaded : 2 ft 4 in (0.71 m) forward; 7 ft 6 in (2.29 m) aft; Loaded : 8 ft 2 in (2.49 m) forward; 14 ft 1 in (4.29 m) aft
- Propulsion: 2 × General Motors 12-567 diesel engines, two shafts, twin rudders
- Speed: 10.8 knots (20.0 km/h; 12.4 mph)
- Range: 6,000 nmi (11,000 km) at 9 kn (17 km/h; 10 mph)
- Boats & landing craft carried: 6 × LCVPs
- Troops: 14 officers, 131 enlisted men
- Complement: 9 officers, 220 enlisted men
- Armament: 6 × 40 mm guns; 12 × 20 mm guns

USS Kemper County (LST-854) was an LST-542-class tank landing ship built for the United States Navy during World War II. Named after Kemper County, Mississippi, she was the only U.S. Naval vessel to bear the name.

Originally laid down as USS LST-854 by the Chicago Bridge & Iron Company of Seneca, Illinois on 30 August 1944; launched on 20 November, sponsored by Mrs. M. A. Menkol; and commissioned on 14 December.

== Service history ==
=== World War II, 1945 ===
After shakedown off Florida, LST-854 departed New Orleans for the Pacific Ocean on 15 January 1945. Steaming via the Panama Canal, the West Coast, and Pearl Harbor, she reached Ulithi, Caroline Islands on 1 April. There she prepared to support the invasion of Okinawa; then, with an Army Aviation Engineer Battalion on board, she sailed on 12 April for that strategic island which lay at the gateway to the heart of the Japanese Empire. The campaign was well underway when LST-854 arrived at Nago Wan, Okinawa six days later. Despite heavy enemy air raids, she unloaded troops and equipment, then returned Ulithi on 5 May. During the remaining months of the war, she shuttled troops and equipment among the Philippines and Okinawa in preparation for a possible invasion of Japan.

=== 1945–1949 ===
Following the end of World War II, she operated in the Far East, transporting occupation forces until November. LST-854 arrived at Seattle, Washington on 16 December, then after overhaul and training returned to the Far East on 27 June 1946. From 1946 to 1949 she transported Navy and Marine Corps troops and cargo among Chinese ports and the Marianas. The veteran landing ship returned to the United States on 6 June 1949, and decommissioned on 21 October at Puget Sound Navy Yard.

=== Korean War, 1950–1953 ===
On the outbreak of the Korean War, the United States responded by sending forces to aid South Korea. To assist in the transportation of troops and cargo, LST-854 was re-commissioned on 20 November 1950; then, after training, she departed San Diego on 17 March 1951. Three months later she commenced operations in the War Zone, and from June to December operated between Japan and Korea. Her duties in Korea were transporting prisoners-of-war from Pusan to Koje Do, furnishing logistics support for troops at Koje Do, and rotating cargo and troops among Korean ports. During early January 1952 LST-854 participated in the landing of the 40th Division at Inchon and provided refugees lifts along the Korean coast. Departing Yokosuka on 25 February, the landing ship arrived at San Diego on 16 March. After overhaul and training along the West Coast, she was back in Japan on 26 November. For the remaining months of the conflict, LST-854 shuttled troops and cargo in support of United Nations Command forces engaged in fierce combat on the Asian mainland. Following the truce which ended hostilities, the veteran landing ship transported pro- and anti-Communist prisoners to await repatriation.

=== 1953–1965 ===
LST-854 returned San Diego on 17 October and, following overhaul, performed training exercises along the West Coast. From May 1954 to May 1960 she sailed on four WestPac cruises in which she supported the 7th Fleet. LST-854 was named USS Kemper County (LST-854) on 1 July 1955. After returning from her WestPac cruise on 6 May 1960, Kemper County spent the next five years performing amphibious training exercises along the California coast and in the Hawaiian operating area.

=== Vietnam War, 1965–1969 ===
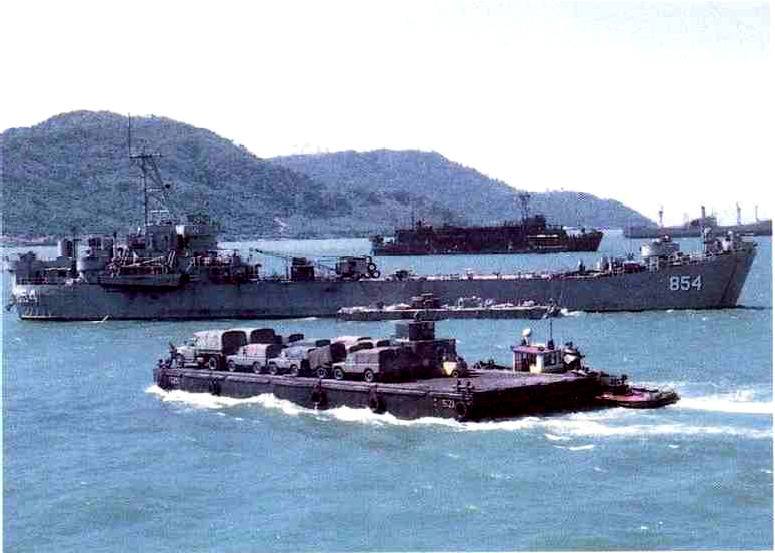
USS Kemper County (LST-854) at anchor of Naval Support Activity Detachment Vũng Tàu, South Vietnam, c. 1967. Note the Australian Army vehicles on the barge in the foreground.

In the early 1960s the United States expanded efforts to protect the integrity and independence of South Vietnam. To aid in the vast logistic demands created, Kemper County departed San Diego on 11 October 1965, arriving Subic Bay, Philippines on 12 November. Ten days later she arrived at Da Nang, and operated along the coast of South Vietnam for the rest of the year. She operated primarily in the rivers of the Mekong Delta transiting enemy-controlled territory to carry supplies to the Army of the Republic of Vietnam Headquarters at Can Tho. Four times she ascended these streams as far as 90 miles (145 km) inland. On 3 March 1966 she assisted tanker SS Paloma which lay burning and adrift in the Saigon River after a Viet Cong attack. On reaching the scene, she shelled the river bank from which the attack had been launched while fighting the conflagration on the tanker. During this deployment Kemper County carried over 10,000 tons of military cargo and vast quantities of food and clothing for the war-stricken civilian population of South Vietnam before returning to San Diego on 28 May 1966. Her services won her the Battle Efficiency "E" of 1966. She operated off the West Coast into 1967 preparing for future action.

=== Decommissioning and transfer ===
Decommissioned on 28 May 1969, Kemper County was subsequently struck from the Naval Vessel Register (date unknown). Transferred to the Government of Barbados in July 1975 and renamed Northpoint, she was later sold to the Government of Panama (c. early-1980s) and renamed El Gato Blanco. Her final fate is unknown.

== Awards ==
LST-854 received one battle star for World War II service, five battle stars for service in the Korean War, and one award of the Navy Unit Commendation and six campaign stars for Vietnam War service.
