= Lyscum Elbert Crowson =

American Methodist preacher (1903-1993)

Reverend Lyscum Elbert Crowson
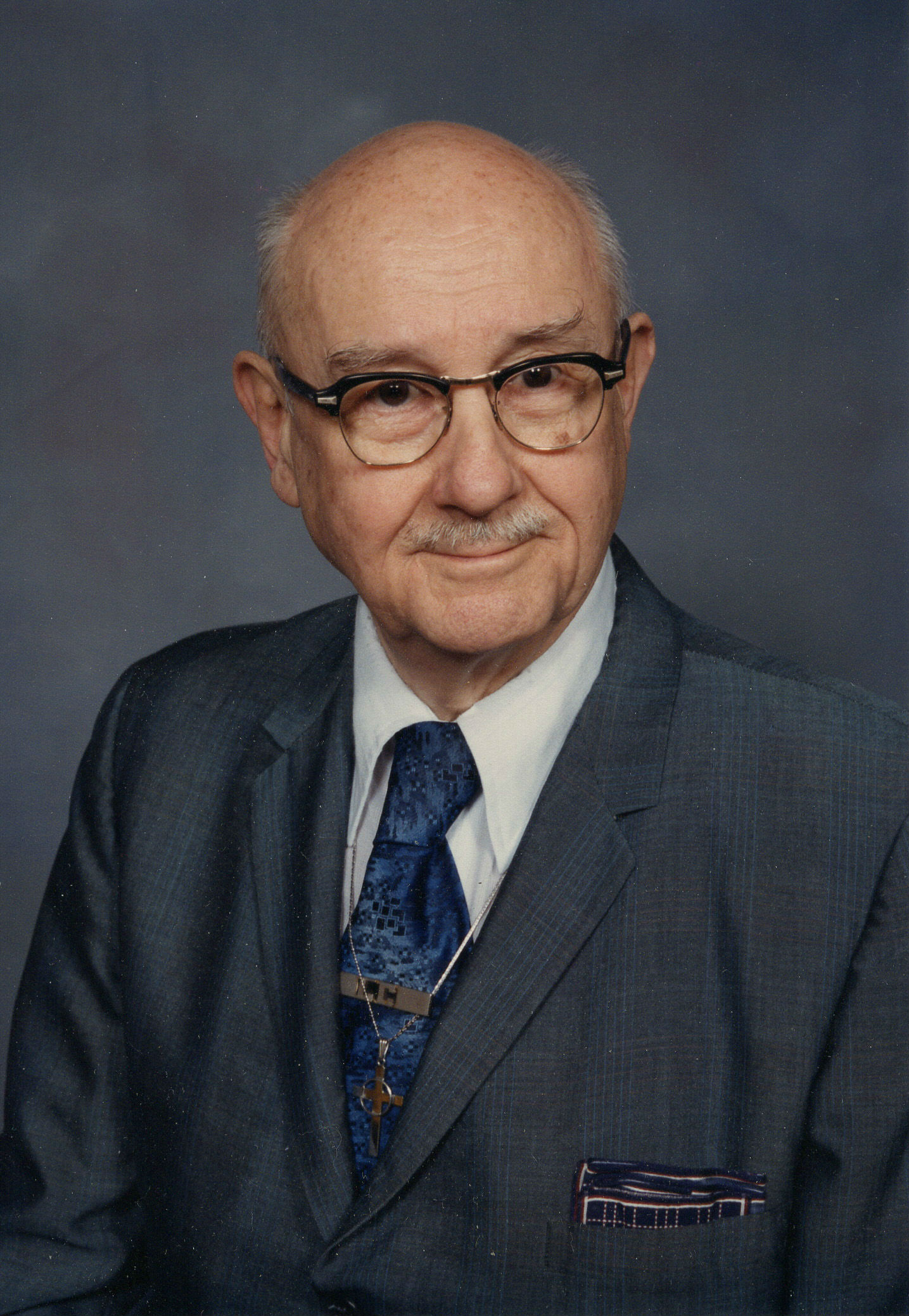
- Born: June 26, 1903; De Kalb, Mississippi
- Died: August 26, 1993 (aged 90); West Virginia
- Education: Asbury College
- Movement: Prohibition of alcohol in West Virginia; abolition of capital punishment

Reverend Lyscum Elbert Crowson (June 26, 1903 - August 26, 1993) was a Methodist preacher who gained notoriety in the 1960s for leading West Virginia's "dry" movement, aimed at prohibiting the sale of "liquor by the drink;" and pressing a successful campaign to abolish capital punishment. As the chairman of the West Virginia Citizens Committee for Defeat of the Liquor Amendment, Crowson frequently engaged in high-profile debates with politicians, the press, and citizens. Crowson won attention for being fiery and unwavering in his political views.

== Personal life ==
L.E. Crowson was born in De Kalb, Mississippi in 1903 to Frederick Lawrence Crowson, a Methodist preacher and Elizabeth S. Pope. Frederick was active in the Methodist Episcopal Church, South. Crowson and his family moved often around the South, spending large amounts of time in Florida, Mississippi, and Alabama.

At 18, Crowson received his license to preach. He subsequently graduated from Asbury College (now Asbury University). After returning to Florida from Asbury, he married Aline Purdom in 1927; they had two daughters. Crowson established his influence in West Virginia from the 1930s to the 1980s while serving in local churches across the state. The couple retired, and lived until their deaths, in Moorefield, West Virginia.

== Politics ==
Throughout his adult life, Crowson was often involved in the insider politics of the wider Methodist church. He repeatedly made waves in regional and national Methodist church conferences with his conservative beliefs.

At the 1960 Methodist General Conference in Denver, Colorado, Crowson presented a resolution aimed at discrediting the presidential aspirations of then-candidate John F. Kennedy, on the grounds that Kennedy's Catholicism caused fundamental problems for American sovereignty. The resolution was overwhelmingly rejected, and Crowson was strongly rebuked by fellow ministers.

In 1962, Crowson headed a successful statewide campaign in West Virginia to defeat a constitutional amendment in favor of loosening alcohol laws for restaurants. Crowson's actions ranged from engaging in high-profile debates to going undercover to liquor establishments, as well as regularly preaching the evils of drink from the pulpit. Crowson frequently clashed with West Virginia newspapers throughout the 1960s, notably with John Hodel and Roy Lee Harmon of the Beckley Register-Herald. Harmon described Crowson as "militant" and "fanatical" and compared Crowson to a "plague of locusts," while Crowson criticized the newspaper over journalistic integrity.

While it was the newspaper coverage, as in the Beckley Register-Herald and the Charleston Gazette, that made him a familiar figure in West Virginia politics, it was more often the stories about Crowson's undercover exploits that delighted the public. The most famous of these stories circulated in West Virginia for decades. Crowson had told reporters about one of his covert visits to an illicit bar, where he ordered a drink and began conversing with another patron. As a teetotaler unable to drink the alcohol, Crowson said, he discreetly poured it out on the floor. A letter-writer to the Charleston Gazette reported having discovered Crowson's ruse when Crowson accidentally poured his drink into the man's shoe. The letter-writer's claim about his alcohol-soaked shoe proved to be a spoof, but the tale became part of Crowson's public image.

Crowson was a lifelong opponent of capital punishment, both on religious grounds and because he said no credible evidence showed its efficacy as a deterrent. He campaigned for its abolition, and was invited to stand behind Gov. Hulett Smith as Smith signed the 1965 law ending its use. When advocates proposed reinstating the penalty in 1969, Crowson joined other religious leaders in testifying against the idea at a state Senate hearing.
