= Doc Land =

American baseball player (1903-1986)

- Outfielder
- Born: May 14, 1903; Binnsville, Mississippi, U.S.
- Died: April 14, 1986 (aged 82); Livingston, Alabama, U.S.
- Batted: Left Threw: Left

MLB debut
- October 6, 1929, for the Washington Senators

Last MLB appearance
- October 6, 1929, for the Washington Senators

MLB statistics
- Batting average: .000
- At bats: 3
- Walks: 1
- Stats at Baseball Reference

Teams
- Washington Senators (1929)

William Gilbert Land (born Doc Burrell Land, May 14, 1903 – April 14, 1986) was an American Major League Baseball outfielder. He played one game for the Washington Senators, appearing as their starting center fielder in the last game of the 1929 season, filling in for Sam West.
