= Kenny Wagner =

American murderer

- Born: William Kenneth Wagner; February 18, 1903; Scott County, Virginia, U.S.
- Died: March 9, 1958 (aged 55); Mississippi State Penitentiary, Sunflower County, Mississippi, U.S.
- Occupation: Bootlegger
- Known for: Escaping prison multiple times
- Conviction: Murder
- Penalty: Life imprisonment

Details
- Victims: 5
- Date: 1925-1926

William Kenneth (Kinnie) Wagner (February 18, 1903 – March 9, 1958) commonly known as Kinnie Wagner (although Kennie and Kenny were also used) was a bootlegger in Mississippi, who murdered five people, including three police officers. He escaped from custody numerous times, but ultimately died in prison.

== Early life ==
Wagner left home at the age of fourteen and joined the Richard Brothers Circus. He became known as a trickshot artist. At the onset of Prohibition he made and sold moonshine.

== Criminal activity ==
In 1925, Wagner had his first infraction with the law when he was arrested in Lucedale, Mississippi for stealing a watch. Awaiting trial, he overpowered the jailer and stole a horse. A posse tracked him to a shack in the woods, but he shot his way out, killing a deputy. He fled to his native mountains. Meeting his sister and friends on the banks of Holston River, near Kingsport, Tennessee, he engaged in a shootout with five local lawmen, killing two and wounding a third. Wagner fled first on horseback, then on foot. He surrendered to a storekeeper in Waycross, Virginia.

Following a trial in Sullivan County ending with a death sentence verdict, Wagner won a new trial on appeal, but proceeded to stage a successful escape from state prison. He fled to Mexico and became notorious for bank and train robbery but returned to the United States. He killed two men in barroom brawls and subsequently surrendered to a female sheriff in Arkansas. The two men whom he killed were Will Carper, and his brother, Sam Carper, and they were at Sam's home, not in a bar, and they were unarmed. The sheriff was Lillie Barber, widow of a slain sheriff. She refused to try Wagner, because in Arkansas, murder in cold blood was a capital offense, and she fell in love with him.

Mississippi, Tennessee, and Arkansas wanted him for murder. Since his first killing was in Mississippi, he was tried there and in 1926 was sentenced to life to be served at Parchman Farm. His first escape attempt was foiled by an informant. However, he was allowed to become an armed trustee and head trainer of the prison's bloodhounds. He tracked escapees alone, armed on horseback. In 1940, he escaped but was located three years later near his old Virginia home. Returned to Parchman, he was again a model prisoner until 1948 when he walked off.

His most notable escape was his last attempt and involved a clever trick that was not discovered until Wagner was outside the prison walls. He had been made a trustee whose job it was to tend the dogs at the prison. He quickly realized the dogs were the means by which the prison guards would track him if he were to escape again. He therefore trained the dogs not to track him by whipping them if they followed his scent.

Wagner remained at large in Wahalak, Mississippi, for several years afterward under the alias "Big Jim," and was subsequently placed on the FBI Ten Most Wanted Fugitives list. In 1956, he was recaptured after a jealous rival informed law enforcement officials of his residence at the house of a female friend.

Seriously ill, he stated "I am very happy to be going back to Parchman." He died there in 1958.

== Folklore and legacy ==
There are several folksongs and ballads about Wagner's escapades. There are several books written about the Mississippi outlaw. And he has also been covered in comics and pulp magazines. Folklorists have explained that Wagner had been cast into the stereotype of the Southern or Western outlaw: chivalrous to women, generous to the poor, a free desperado.

== See also ==
- List of serial killers in the United States
