= Milburn Price =

Milburn Price (born 9 April 1938 in Electric Mills, Mississippi) is a former dean of the School of Performing Arts at Samford University in Birmingham, Alabama, from 1993 to 2006. Prior to that he was dean of the School of Church Music at the Southern Baptist Theological Seminary in Louisville, Kentucky, from 1981 to 1993. Earlier he was chair of the Music Department at Furman University from 1972 to 1981. During the 2011–2012 academic year he was visiting professor and acting chair of choral music at Stetson University. He was a visiting professor at Mercer University (2013–2014) and Mississippi College (2014–2015).

Price served as national president of the American Choral Directors Association from 1999 to 2001.

== Publications ==
Price has written texts and music for several hymns, some of which have been included in the 1975 and 1991 editions of Baptist Hymnal, as well as The Worshiping Church (1990) and Celebrating Grace: Hymnal for Baptist Worship (2010). His choral compositions and arrangements have been published by Hinshaw Music, Oxford University Press, Harold Flammer, Carl Fischer, Genevox, MorningStar, Coronet Press, Mark Foster, and Alliance Music Publications. He has been the recipient of an annual ASCAP (American Society of Composers, Authors, and Publishers) Award each year since 1980.

He is co-author of The Dialogue of Worship (1998, with Gary Furr) and A Survey of Christian Hymnody (with William J. Reynolds and David Music, 4th edition, 1999). He has also written articles on music and worship that have appeared in Choral Journal, The Hymn, and Review and Expositor.

== Honors ==
Price has been honored with several awards, including the Award for Exemplary Leadership in Church Music, given by Baylor University's Center for Christian Music Studies in 2006. In 2005 he was presented the W. Hines Sims Award by the Baptist Church Music Conference for his contributions to church music among Baptists.

He received the biennial Award for Choral Excellence from ACDA's Southern Division in 2006.

== Education ==
Dr. Price earned his bachelor's degree in music from the University of Mississippi in 1960. He continued his education at Baylor University, earning a master's degree in music in 1963. He went on to earn his doctorate in musical arts from the University of Southern California in 1967.

After completing his degrees, he pursued post-doctoral studies at Princeton Theological Seminary and Candler School of Theology of Emory University.
