= Devonta Pollard =

American basketball player (born 1994)

Ensenada Lobos
- Position: Power forward
- League: Circuito de Baloncesto del Pacífico

Personal information
- Born: July 7, 1994 (age 32) Porterville, Mississippi, U.S.
- Listed height: 6 ft 8 in (2.03 m)
- Listed weight: 200 lb (91 kg)

Career information
- High school: Kemper County (De Kalb, Mississippi)
- College: Alabama (2012–2013); East Mississippi CC (2013–2014); Houston (2014–2016)
- NBA draft: 2016: undrafted
- Playing career: 2016–present

Career history
- 2016: Liepājas Lauvas
- 2016–2017: Koroivos Amaliadas
- 2017: Al Sadd Doha
- 2018–2019: Niagara River Lions
- 2019: Pioneros de Los Mochis
- 2021: Ensenada Lobos
- 2021: Centauros de Durango
- 2023–present: Ensenada Lobos

Career highlights
- CIBACOPA All-Star (2019); Second-team All-AAC (2016); McDonald's All-American (2012); First-team Parade All-American (2012); Mississippi Mr. Basketball (2012)

Devonta Pollard (born July 7, 1994) is an American professional basketball player who plays for Ensenada Lobos of the Circuito de Baloncesto del Pacífico (CIBAPAC). A 6'8 power forward, Pollard played college basketball for Alabama, East Mississippi Community College and Houston.

== Early life ==
Pollard grew up in the small town of Porterville, Mississippi. His mother, Jessie Mae, played one season in the Women's Professional Basketball League before it folded in 1981, at which point she returned to Porterville and became a high school history teacher. His father, Ervin, was a forklift driver at a paper plant before he died of pancreatic cancer when Pollard was in high school. Since his only sibling, Lewis, lived alone, he grew closer to his mother. However, their home burned down after getting struck by lightning in 2011.

Pollard played high school basketball at Kemper County. As a senior, he led his team to the Mississippi 3A state championship, recording 28 points, 10 rebounds and 10 blocks in the 75–65 title game victory over Booneville. He averaged 23.8 points, 15.7 rebounds and 5.1 blocks per game to earn the Mississippi Mr. Basketball and McDonald's All-American honors. Pollard was a five-star prospect by Rivals.com and was ranked as the seventh-best small forward in his class and the 22nd best prospect in the nation by the organization. On June 1, 2012, he committed to Alabama, citing his wish to remain close to his mother.

== College career ==
As a freshman at Alabama, Pollard was a role player, averaging 3.9 points per game. The following year, he transferred to East Mississippi Community College in order to be closer to his family. As a sophomore, Pollard averaged 12 points and 6.7 rebounds per game, being the third best scorer of the team.

As a junior, he decided to join Houston, being coached by Kelvin Sampson. Pollard became one of the top big men in the American Athletic Conference, averaging 11.4 points and 6.4 rebounds per game. Pollard finished his senior season averaging 14 points and 5.7 rebounds per game being the second scoring and rebounding leader for the Cougars.

== Professional career ==
Following the close of his college career, Pollard was not drafted in the 2016 NBA draft. On October 5, 2016, he signed with Liepājas Lauvas of the Latvian Basket League. In November 2016, he left Liepājas and signed with Koroivos Amaliadas for the rest of the season.

On October 30, 2017, he moved to Al Sadd Doha of the Qatari Basketball League.

Pollard signed with the Pioneros de Los Mochis of the Circuito de Baloncesto de la Costa del Pacífico (CIBACOPA) ahead of the 2019 CIBACOPA season. He earned league All-Star honors.

In 2021, Pollard joined the Ensenada Lobos of the Circuito de Baloncesto del Pacífico (CIBAPAC). He was named a CIBAPAC Region 2 All-Star and won the dunk contest. However, Pollard left the team later that month. He subsequently joined the Centauros de Durango of the same league.

Pollard returned to the Ensenada Lobos in 2023.

== Career statistics ==
Legend
GP	Games played	GS	Games started	MPG	Minutes per game
FG%	Field goal percentage	3P%	3-point field goal percentage	FT%	Free throw percentage
RPG	Rebounds per game	APG	Assists per game	SPG	Steals per game
BPG	Blocks per game	PPG	Points per game	**Bold**	Career high

=== College ===
Year	Team	GP	GS	MPG	FG%	3P%	FT%	RPG	APG	SPG	BPG	PPG
2012–13	Alabama	**36**	7	17.9	.371	.125	.614	3.1	0.6	.7	**.6**	3.9
2014–15	Houston	32	**26**	**30.5**	.457	.000	.725	**6.4**	1.2	**1.2**	.4	11.4
2015–16	Houston	32	25	29.7	**.479**	**.500**	**.747**	5.7	**1.6**	.9	**.6**	**14.0**
Career		100	58	25.7	.450	.158	.719	5.0	1.1	.9	.2	9.5
