= Circuito de Baloncesto del Pacífico =

Mexican basketball league

- Current season, competition or edition: 2023 CIBAPAC season
- Sport: Basketball
- Founded: July 2015; 10 years ago
- Director: César Manuel Ojeda Anaya
- No. of teams: 31
- Country: Mexico
- Headquarters: Guasave, Sinaloa, Mexico
- Continent: FIBA Americas
- Most recent champions: Leones de Guadalajara (1st title)
- Website: www.ligacibapac.com

The Pacific Basketball Circuit (Spanish: Circuito de Baloncesto del Pacífico or CIBAPAC) is a semi-professional basketball league based in Northwestern Mexico. It was founded in 2015 with the purpose of developing young talent from the region. The league began with four charter members from Sinaloa and Durango but has since grown to include teams from across the country.

As of 2023, there were 31 teams from 10 states.

== Format ==
The CIBAPAC is a developmental league that was created with the aim of developing young talent in Northwestern Mexico, especially in cities without a professional team. Outside of the two foreign players allowed per roster, the teams are made up of local talent. League rules require teams to play an under-17 player for the entire first quarter and an under-21 player for the entire second quarter. The goal is for young players to get scouted and earn college scholarships or professional contracts.

== History ==
=== Foundation and early years (2015–2016) ===
The Circuito de Baloncesto del Pacífico (CIBAPAC) was founded in July 2015. The competition, which was officially presented at a press conference the following month, was created as a developmental league for young talent in the Pacific region of Mexico, with the teams initially based in the states of Sinaloa and Durango in its first season. The charter members of the CIBAPAC were the following:

- Empacadores de La Palma (Navolato, Sinaloa)
- Halcones de Guamúchil (Guamúchil, Sinaloa)
- Liebres de Guasave (Guasave, Sinaloa)
- Linces de Santiago Papasquiaro (Santiago Papasquiaro, Durango)

Notably, the Halcones de Guamúchil signed an agreement with the Caballeros de Culiacán of the Circuito de Baloncesto de la Costa del Pacífico (CIBACOPA). The Linces de Santiago Papasquiaro became the inaugural CIBAPAC champions after beating the Empacadores de La Palma in the finals. The CIBAPAC held its second season in 2016 with five teams. Once again, each team was allowed to sign up to two import players. Notably, former Mexico national team member Jesús "Cachuy" González joined the Empacadores de La Palma at the start of the season while waiting to sign with a Liga Nacional de Baloncesto Profesional (LNBP) team; he eventually agreed to a deal with the Santos de San Luis. The Paskolas de Navojoa won the 2016 CIBAPAC title in their debut season after sweeping the Empacadores de La Palma, 3–0, in the finals. The Paskolas directly qualified for the finals after the Ingenieros de Culiacán were unable to travel to Navojoa for the semifinals due to economic problems, which was condemned by league president César Ojeda. The Ingenieros were not allowed to return the following season after failing league requirements.

=== Expansion (2017–2019) ===
Ahead of the 2017 season, the league doubled its number of teams from five to 10, with six from Sinaloa, two from Durango and two from Sonora. The teams were the following:

- Águilas UNES (Durango, Durango)
- Empacadores de La Palma (Navolato, Sinaloa)
- Fuerza Maicera de Navolato (Navolato, Sinaloa)
- Guerreros de Choix (Choix, Sinaloa)
- Liebres de Guasave (Guasave, Sinaloa)
- Linces de Santiago Papasquiaro (Santiago Papasquiaro, Durango)
- Paskolas de Navojoa (Navojao, Sonora)
- Peregrinos de Badiraguato (Badiraguato, Sinaloa)
- Potros ITSON (Ciudad Obregón, Sonora)
- Vikingos de Los Mochis (Los Mochis, Sinaloa)

The CIBAPAC held its first All-Star Game on 19 November 2017 in Durango at the Auditorio del Pueblo, the home venue of the Águilas UNES. Zona Norte defeated Zona Sur by a score of 114–109 and Jeff Stubbs was named the All-Star Game MVP. Additionally, Corey Hall won the three-point contest while Jay Hedegeman won the dunk contest. The league championship was won by the Águilas UNES, who swept the Peregrinos de Badiraguato in the finals.

Progression of expansion
Season	No. of teams
2015	4
2016	5
2017	10
2018	11
2019	16
2020	6
2021	37
2022	25
2023	31

Ahead of its 2018 season, the CIBAPAC grew from 10 to 11 teams. While the league lost the Águilas UNES, the Guerreros de Choix, and the Vikingos de Los Mochis, it added the Águilas UAS, the Fortaleza 31, the Guaycuras de La Paz, and the Marlins de San José del Cabo. The second CIBAPAC All-Star Game was held on 28 October in La Paz at the Arena La Paz. Zona Norte defeated Zona Sur, 148–116. Following the success of the Peregrinos de Badiraguato the previous season, the municipal government invested MXN$100,000 so that the team could give the public free admission to all their home games in 2018. The Peregrinos went on to reach the finals, where they defeated the Linces de Santiago Papasquiaro, 3–2, to capture the league championship.

Three teams left the CIBAPAC ahead of its 2019 season, including the former champions, the Águilas UNES. However, the league expanded to a total of 16 teams that year due to eight additions: the Capitanes de Puerto Peñasco, the Colorados de San Luis Río Colorado, the Delfines de Mazatlán, the Dragones de Comondú, the Ensenada Lobos, the Guinda de Nogales, the Hardcore de Loreto, and the Mineros de Santa Rosalía. League president César Ojeda announced that the 16 teams would be divided into two groups. The 2019 CIBAPAC All-Star Game was held on 28 September in Ensenada at the Óscar “Tigre” García Municipal Gymnasium, the home of the Ensenada Lobos. The Western Conference defeated the Eastern Conference, 116–103, while Lobos player Jeff Early Jr. was named the All-Star Game MVP. Early won the dunk contest at halftime while his Lobos teammate, Luis “Chupa” Ramírez, won the three-point contest.

The Peregrinos de Badiraguato beat the Delfines de Mazatlán in the Eastern Conference finals while the Colorados de San Luis Río Colorado defeated the Ensenada Lobos in the Western Conference finals, setting up a matchup between the two for the title. In the finals, the Colorados overcame a 2–0 series deficit against the Peregrinos by winning three games in a row to secure the 2019 CIBAPAC championship.

=== Pandemic and recovery (2020–2022) ===
The onset of the COVID-19 pandemic brought uncertainty to the CIBAPAC and its teams. Other leagues in the region, such as the CIBACOPA and the Liga de Básquetbol Estatal de Chihuahua, suspended their campaigns. The 2020 CIBAPAC season was originally planned to begin on 10 July, which was earlier than in past years. This was later pushed back to August and then October. However, by September, the league was still unable to confirm a start date for the season, though league president César Ojeda assured that 24 teams were registered to play. In early October, the Peregrinos de Badiraguato announced that their team would not participate in the 2020 season due to public health concerns, becoming the third team to opt out after the Marlins de San José del Cabo and the Dragones de Comondú. A few days later, it was announced that a shortened 2020 season would be held from 12 to 16 November in the state of Baja California Sur using a "bubble" format, similar to the NBA Bubble used for the 2020 NBA playoffs. It was also originally announced that there would be eight teams divided into two groups that would play in Loreto and San José del Cabo.

The 2020 "bubble" playoffs ultimately consisted of a six-team round-robin tournament, held in La Paz and Cabo San Lucas, where the top two teams then qualified for the championship game. The Guaycuras de La Paz defeated the Pelícanos de Cabo San Lucas, 96–93, in the finals to capture the 2020 CIBAPAC title. Additionally, the Delfines de Mazatlán beat the Choyeros de San José del Cabo, 77–73, in the third-place game.

The 2021 CIBAPAC season was initially scheduled to begin in late August, but it was pushed back to late September to allow for more people to receive the COVID-19 vaccine. 37 teams from 11 different states were divided into six groups, or "Regions". There were a record seven teams in Baja California (Region 2) and six in Baja California Sur (Region 1). The league, which originated in the Pacific region in the Northwest of the country, had officially expanded to the opposite coast. Region 6 was composed of teams based in Tamaulipas and Veracruz, both of which border the Gulf of Mexico. Notably, the Ensenada Lobos signed Devonta Pollard, a former McDonald's All-American. Additionally, the Guerreros de Xalapa hired Jessica Elizondo to lead the team, and she became the first woman to serve as head coach of a professional basketball team in Mexico. Instead of staging one single All-Star Game, the league held one for each Region. In the first round of the playoffs, 14-year-old Oliver Vargas suited up for the Ganaderos de Durango. Each Region held a semifinals and finals round, each in a best-of-three format to determine their respective champions. The winners of each Region were the following:

- Region 1: Pelícanos de Cabos San Lucas
- Region 2: Ensenada Lobos
- Region 3: Potros de Casas Grandes
- Region 4: Delfines de Mazatlán
- Region 5: Demoledora de Linares
- Region 6: Guerreros de Xalapa

The Regional winners then progressed to the quarterfinal round, which was played in a best-of-five format. The Ensenada Lobos beat the Pelícanos de Cabos San Lucas while the Demoledora de Linares beat the Guerreros de Xalapa, each winning their respective series' 3–1 to secure their semifinals spots. The Delfines de Mazatlán then pulled out of their series against the Potros de Casas Grandes, which was tied 2–2 at the time, knowing they would still qualify for the last semifinal spot as the "best losers" for winning two games. The "Final Four" was played in Ensenada on the first weekend of December, shifting to a single-elimination format. The Delfines de Mazatlán and the Potros de Casas Grandes met again in the first semifinal; Steve Pledger scored 30 points to lead the Potros to an 88–83 victory. The Ensenada Lobos beat the Demoledora de Linares, 96–93, in the other semifinal the next day, with Jeff Early Jr. recording 48 points, eight rebounds and five assists. The Lobos defeated the Potros, 103–88, in the championship game, and Early was named the Finals MVP after scoring 36 points.

The 2022 CIBAPAC season tipped off in September, with 25 teams from nine states divided into six Regions. The Ensenada Lobos signed Kezo Brown while one of the expansion teams, the Buras de Hermosillo, signed Gaston Essengué. 16 teams qualified for the playoffs. The Leones de Guadalajara defeated the Mineros de Cananea, 3–1, in the finals, winning the league title in their debut season.

=== Continued growth (2023–present) ===
In January 2023, league president César Ojeda led a meeting in Guasave between owners of 24 teams – the first owners' meeting announcing that the team registration deadline was mid-February and the tentative start date to the new season was 9 June. The league became official affiliates of FIBA and the Asociación Deportiva Mexicana de Básquetbol (ADEMEBA). In an effort to move towards professionalism, it also established a rule ending the practice of using local referees for home games. In March, the Guaycuras de La Paz presented a women's section complete with a full roster and coaching staff, even though there was no CIBAPAC women's league. The league did announce, however, the creation of the Copa Gobernadora, a competition between the five teams based in Baja California (Ensenada, Mexicali, Rosarito, Tecate and Tijuana), organized in collaboration with the Baja California Institute of Sport and Physical Culture. Notably, the Reyes de Durango signed Irwin Ávalos, a hometown player and national team member.

The 2023 season tipped off in June, with 31 teams from 10 states divided into six Regions. The CIBAPAC All-Star Game was played on 2 July in San Luis Río Colorado. A few days later, 14-year-old Ulises Ortiz made his debut for the Reyes de Durango.

== CIBAPAC Femenil ==
The league launched a women's counterpart, the Circuito de Baloncesto del Pacífico (CIBAPAC) Femenil, which began play in 2024 with seven teams split into two regions:

- Region 1
  - Guinda de Nogales (Nogales, Sonora)
  - Mineras de Cananea (Cananea, Sonora)
  - Vaqueras de Agua Prieta (Agua Prieta, Sonora)
- Region 2
  - Guaycuras de La Paz (La Paz, Baja California Sur)
  - Pelícanos de Cabo San Lucas (Cabo San Lucas, Baja California Sur)
  - Piratas Bagdag de Matamoros (Matamoros, Tamaulipas)
  - Stars de Santiago (Santiago, Nuevo León)

== List of champions ==
Year	Champion	Series	Runner-up	Ref.
2015	Linces de Santiago Papasquiaro	3–1	Empacadores de La Palma	
2016	Paskolas de Navojoa	3–0	Empacadores de La Palma	
2017	Águilas UNES	3–0	Peregrinos de Badiraguato	
2018	Peregrinos de Badiraguato	3–2	Linces de Santiago Papasquiaro	
2019	Colorados de San Luis Río Colorado	3–2	Peregrinos de Badiraguato	
2020	Guaycuras de La Paz	(Note: The 2020 CIBAPAC playoffs were played in a "bubble" due to the COVID-19 pandemic, with six teams taking part in a four-day round-robin tournament to determine the league champion.)	Pelícanos de Cabo San Lucas	
2021	Ensenada Lobos	1–0 (Note: The 2021 CIBAPAC playoffs consisted of a single-elimination tournament. Ensenada defeated Casas Grandes, 103–88, in the championship game.)	Potros de Casas Grandes	
2022	Leones de Guadalajara	3–1	Mineros de Cananea	
