= Betty Jane Long =

American politician (1928–2023)

Member of the Mississippi House of Representatives
- In office January 3, 1956 – January 3, 1984

Personal details
- Born: May 8, 1928 Electric Mills, Mississippi, U.S.
- Died: June 29, 2023 (aged 95) Marion, Mississippi, U.S.
- Party: Democratic
- Education: Millsaps College (BS); University of Alabama (MS); University of Mississippi (LLB)

Betty Jane Long (May 8, 1928 – June 29, 2023) was an American politician and attorney who served in the Mississippi House of Representatives from 1956 to 1984. A member of the Democratic Party, she was one of few women legislators in Mississippi during her time in the House. She chaired several committees and subcommittees, including a subcommittee on the Equal Rights Amendment, which she opposed. After her retirement from the House, Long was appointed to a committee that drafted a proposal for a new Constitution of Mississippi.

== Early life and education ==
Long was born on May 8, 1928, in Electric Mills, Mississippi, and moved to Meridian with her family when she was eight years old. She earned the Bachelor of Science degree from Millsaps College, the Master of Science degree from the University of Alabama, and the Bachelor of Laws degree from the University of Mississippi School of Law. She was admitted to the Mississippi Bar in August 1953, the only woman among the 16 new members.

== Career ==
In August 1955, Long was elected to represent Lauderdale County in the Mississippi House of Representatives, after winning the Democratic primary against four opponents and facing no Republican opposition. She was one of only two women in the House of Representatives, along with Lovie Gore of Oktibbeha County. Long was the chair of the State Library committee, and a member of Ways and Means committee and Judiciary A standing committee. She was close friends with state tax collector Nellah Massey Bailey, and introduced a resolution of respect after Bailey's death in March 1956 that was adopted by the House. In July 1956, she was elected permanent secretary of the Mississippi Democratic Party, and selected as an alternate delegate for the state to the 1956 Democratic National Convention. Long and Gore introduced a bill in January 1958 to qualify women for jury duty in Mississippi, with exemptions for nurses and mothers of underage children, and to provide women's restrooms in courthouses. Despite the bill receiving support from Governor James P. Coleman and being passed by the state senate, it was not taken up by the House Judiciary Committee.

It was reported as early as October 1957 that Long was considering a primary challenge to U.S. Representative W. Arthur Winstead, but she ultimately opted to seek re-election. She defeated one challenger in August 1959 and was re-elected to a second term. She was added to the House committee on juvenile delinquency and child welfare, and was chosen as secretary of three House committees: Ways and Means, Judiciary en banc, and Judiciary A. In her second term, Long introduced bills that abolished the office of state tax collector, banned false wholesale advertising, and increased penalties for narcotics dealers who sold to children. She also co-founded the Acme Cafe in Meridian with her mother in November 1960. Long announced her plans to seek re-election to a third term in June 1963, and was re-elected in August 1963. In November 1964, Governor Paul B. Johnson Jr. appointed her to the newly created Commission on the Status of Women, designed to study the status of women in Mississippi with respect to employment, education, and legal rights.

After the death of Mississippi House Speaker Walter Sillers Jr., the House unanimously named Long as temporary speaker on November 9, 1966, in order to hold the session to elect a permanent speaker. After two rounds of voting, the House elected John R. Junkin later that day. Long was re-elected to a fourth and fifth term in 1967 and 1971, respectively, without opposition in the primary or general elections. She chaired a House Rules subcommittee on the proposed Equal Rights Amendment in 1974 and was the only female member of the committee. Long personally opposed the ERA, saying that it was "broad enough to create problems not envisioned by the proponents", and the resolution failed to pass the House Rules Committee in February 1975. In the 1975 elections, she defeated a Democratic primary challenger and H. E. Damon, a Republican engineering firm owner, winning re-election to a sixth term in the House. House Speaker's removal of Long and three other conservative Democratic lawmakers from their committee chairmanships in January 1976 was reported as "an apparent swing to 'middle road' politics in the House". She was a delegate for George Wallace at the 1976 Democratic National Convention. Long was unopposed in the 1979 election and was re-elected to a seventh term; the other women incumbents were defeated that year, leaving Long as the only female legislator in Mississippi.

In May 1983, Long announced her intentions to retire from the House, citing her father's illness and the financial pressure of running her cafe. She was succeeded by Republican Bill Crawford. In November 1985, she was appointed by Governor William Allain to a committee examining potential changes to the legislative sections of the Mississippi Constitution. She was later named to a 16-member committee tasked with drafting of the new proposed constitution.
