= Hank Presswood =

American baseball player

- Shortstop / Third baseman
- Born: October 7, 1921; Electric Mills, Mississippi, U.S.
- Died: December 27, 2014 (aged 93); Chicago, Illinois, U.S.
- Batted: Right Threw: Right

Teams
- Cleveland Buckeyes (1948–1950); Kansas City Monarchs (1952–1953)

Henry Presswood (October 7, 1921 – December 27, 2014) was an American infielder who played in the Negro American League. He batted and threw right handed.

Born in Electric Mills, Mississippi, Presswood played sandlot ball before joining the Mill City Jitterbugs club in 1936 and 1937 and later the Denkman All-Stars in Canton, Mississippi from 1938 through 1944.

Afterwards, Presswood served in the U.S. Army from 1945 to 1947 during World War II conflict, then returned briefly to the Denkman All-Stars. Content with playing locally, it was not until after he received an offer to play in the Negro leagues. Presswood then was assigned to the Cleveland Buckeyes in 1948 and immediately he was installed as their shortstop, playing alongside such greats as Webbo Clarke, Sam Jethroe and Sam 'Toothpick' Jones.

The 26-year old rookie joined the lineup of defending champions of the Negro American League, just one year after Jackie Robinson, Larry Doby, Hank Thompson, Willard Brown and Dan Bankhead had broken the color barrier in the Major Leagues.

Presswood played with the Buckeyes until they folded in the 1950 season. Following a year off, he was picked up by the Kansas City Monarchs, who were managed by the legendary Buck O’Neil. Presswood played with the Monarchs as a third baseman from 1952 to 1953, in a time when Ernie Banks was their regular shortstop. O’Neil gave Presswood the nickname of 'Baby', which stuck with him well after his career was over. Besides, O’Neil also served as his mentor both on and off the field.

When his baseball days came to an end, Preswood settled in Chicago, Illinois where he worked at the Inland Steel Company and played fast-pitch softball for the company team, retiring after 30 years of work.

Preswood received his due recognition as an octogenarian in 2008, when Major League Baseball staged a special draft of the surviving Negro league players, doing a tribute for those living Negro leaguers who were kept out of the Big Leagues because of their race. Hall of Fame Baseball player Dave Winfield hatched the idea to have this draft while MLB clubs each selected a former NLB player. As a result, Preswood was drafted by the Chicago White Sox as a shortstop/third baseman.

Two years later in 2010, The Topps Company honored him with a baseball card in their Allen & Ginter set, as he remarked about finally having a rookie card.

In his later years, Presswood became a spokesperson for the Negro leagues, attending numerous events and telling people baseball fans and hardball history enthusiasts with tales and remembrances of his playing days. He died in 2014 in Chicago at the age of 93.
