= Electric Mills, Mississippi =

- Unincorporated community
- Location in Mississippi and the United States Electric Mills (the United States)
- Coordinates: 32°46′9″N 88°27′50″W
- Country: United States
- State: Mississippi
- County: Kemper
- Elevation: 190 ft (58 m)
- Time zone: UTC-6 (Central (CST))
  - Summer (DST): UTC-5 (CDT)
- GNIS feature ID: 669716

Electric Mills is an unincorporated community in Kemper County, Mississippi. It lies along U.S. Route 45 east of the city of De Kalb, the county seat of Kemper County.

== History ==
The town of Electric Mills was established in 1913 and named after its modern, electrically powered mill; one of the first mills to be completely electric-powered.

In 1914, Electric Mills and Roanoke Rapids, North Carolina were selected by the United States Public Health Service as sites to conduct fieldwork on the prevention of malaria. Through improved drainage and the use of quinine, both towns experienced significant reductions in the disease.

Much of the town was removed after milling ceased in 1941.

Electric Mills is located on the Kansas City Southern Railway. A post office operated under the name Electric Mills from 1911 to 1985.

== Notable people ==
- Betty Jane Long, member of the Mississippi House of Representatives
- Hardy Myers, Oregon Attorney General and speaker of the Oregon House of Representatives.
- Henry Presswood, baseball player in the Negro leagues from 1948 to 1952.
- Milburn Price, dean of the School of Performing Arts at Samford University.
