= Alcohol laws of West Virginia =

Alcohol laws of West Virginia are more complex on paper than in actual practice, owing to a provision of the state constitution and "work-arounds" of its terms.

== Constitution ==
The state constitution, Article VI, Section 46, passed to repeal prohibition in 1934, prohibits the consumption of "intoxicating liquors" in a "saloon or other public place".

== Retail sale of beer and wine ==
Beer has been available in general, privately owned, retail stores since 1934. Wine was transferred from the state-owned "ABC Stores" system to private sale in 1981 via H.B. 1111.

== Retail sale of liquor ==
Prior to 1990, liquor was sold only in a state owned system of stores, known as ABC Stores. In that year, the state withdrew from the retail liquor business and auctioned off permits to private businesses, who operate as "agents of the state". In smaller counties, a local monopoly was provided for, with only one agent per area, but in larger counties, multiple competing agencies were granted. Agencies are rebid every 10 years. In the 2010 rebid, the following agencies were granted:

Rite Aid drug store chain, 42 agencies

CVS drug store chain, 9 agencies

7-Eleven convenience store chain, 20 agencies

Sam's Club warehouse store chain, 2 agencies

Kroger grocery store chain, 1 agency

Par Mar Stores 1 agency

privately owned convenience stores, 31 agencies

privately owned alcohol and tobacco shops, 14 agencies

privately owned grocery stores, 7 agencies

privately owned souvenir shop, 1 agency

privately owned stand-alone liquor only stores, 40 agencies

== By the drink sale of beer ==
In 1937, the state "worked around" the constitutional prohibition on public consumption by redefining standard beer as "non-intoxicating beer" and thus permitting the sale of this product in bars and restaurants. All beer vendors to this day are legally selling "non-intoxicating beer".

== By the drink sale of wine and liquor ==
Following World War II, there was a desire to provide for the sale of wine and liquor by the drink, particularly in the northern parts of the state. In 1948 the state provided for the licensing of private clubs, such as veteran's organizations, fraternal organizations, and golf and country clubs, on the theory that these were not "public places".

Throughout the 1950s, however state voters regularly rejected constitutional amendments which provided for public consumption. The Citizen's Committee for the Defeat of the Liquor Amendment, led by Methodist minister L.E. Crowson, campaigned across the state and participated in public debates that were instrumental in keeping the amendment from passing. Votes were generally along regional lines, with northern areas and larger cities supporting repeal, and southern and rural areas supporting the continued ban. In 1961, the state legislature found a "work-around" that short-circuited another vote. The new law provided for a new type of "private club". In actual practice, these "private clubs" are simply public places. Patrons become "members" for one dollar with the purchase of their first drink, which comes with a one dollar "discount", with the law requiring that the club may not refuse "membership" to any person over age 21. In previous years, patrons were actually issued membership cards, but this practice has fallen into disuse and 99% of patrons are unaware that they are members of any such "club". Technically, public bars and saloons remain illegal in the state to this day. The 1961 law was a part of a political deal whereby southern legislators agreed to these changes, and northern legislators withdrew their blocking of the renaming of Marshall College, which had been accredited as a "university" since 1937 and which is located in southern West Virginia, to Marshall University. This system remains in effect to this day. Such "clubs" are required to post a registry number which begins with the letter "ABCC" followed by a serial number, over their doors.

The Greenbrier Resort in White Sulphur Springs, simply adds a $10 "alcohol membership fee" to the bill of all first time patrons.

== Raising the ABV% Cap ==
Prior to July 2009, non-intoxicating beer was defined as all malt based beverages that contained at least 0.5% ABV and not more than 6% ABV. Therefore, all beer sold in WV could not contain more than 6% ABV. This effectively eliminated nearly 2/3 of all beer being produced throughout the world from being purchased in WV. Beginning in 2005 there were many attempts to raise that limit so that the WV market would be opened to the many world class beers that were, at the time, illegal to purchase in WV. The WV Beer Wholesalers Association were initially opposed to the change in the law stating that it would cause higher rates of underage drinking and DUI's. The facts however showed that this was not the case and in 2009, the WV Beer Wholesalers Association changed their stance on the subject and, along with the beer consumer advocacy group West Virginia Craft Beer Society, proceeded to lobby the Legislature to pass HB 2719, aka "The Craft Beer Bill" and change the definition of "non-intoxicating beer" to all malt based beverages between 0.5% and 12% ABV. The WV Legislature passed the bill in April 2009 and Governor Joe Manchin III signed the bill into law in July 2009.

== Days and hours ==
Retail sale of beer and wine is prohibited daily between 2:00 a.m. and 6:00 a.m.. Retail sale of liquor is prohibited on Easter Sunday and Christmas Day, and between 12:00 midnight and 6:00 a.m each day. Private clubs must close by 3:30 a.m. and remain closed until 6:00 a.m each day. Taverns/bars must close by 2:30 a.m. and remain closed until 6:00 a.m each day.

In 2016, the state permitted a local option election whereby counties may change the Sunday 1:00 p.m. time to 10:00 a.m. Several counties immediately scheduled such elections for November 2016.

== Drinking age and dry counties ==
The drinking age was 18 for beer/wine and 21 for liquor until 1972, when it was lowered to 18 for all beverages (along with the age of majority). It was then raised to 19 in 1983 (21 for non-residents) and 21 for all in 1986. Persons under 18 are also not allowed to sell alcohol. Calhoun County was dry for wine and hard liquor sales until August 11, 2021, in which it became wet. There are no more dry counties in West Virginia, however there is still one dry municipality: Brandonville. All counties are wet for off-premises consumption as of 2020.

== Cross-border issues ==
Because its laws are less restrictive than its neighbor states, West Virginia benefits from sales to border residents, especially from the southern part of its border with Kentucky which has several "dry" counties. Huntington also benefits from neighboring Lawrence County, Ohio, having several dry townships. Also Mineral County benefits people from nearby Allegany County Maryland
