= Louis Westerfield =

American lawyer (1949–1996)

- Born: July 31, 1949; De Kalb, Mississippi, US
- Died: August 24, 1996 (aged 47)
- Education: Southern University (1971); Loyola University (1974); Columbia University (1980)
- Title: Dean of the University of Mississippi School of Law
- Spouse: Gelounder Westerfield

Louis Westerfield (July 31, 1949 – August 24, 1996) was an American lawyer and law professor who was the first African-American Dean of the University of Mississippi School of Law.

== Early years ==
Born July 31, 1949, in DeKalb, Mississippi, Westerfield was the son of a Mississippi sharecropper. He received his bachelor's degree from Southern University at New Orleans in 1971. In 1974, he received his Juris Doctor from Loyola University School of Law in New Orleans. He earned his Master of Laws from Columbia Law School in New York City in 1980.

Westerfield began his legal career in 1974 as an assistant district attorney in New Orleans and a year later became assistant professor of law and director of the law clinic at Southern University Law Center. Westerfield joined Loyola's law faculty in 1978 and went to the University of Mississippi as its first tenured black law professor in 1983. He became dean of the University of Mississippi School of Law in 1994.

Westerfield died on August 24, 1996, from heart attack.
