= Perkins House (DeKalb, Mississippi) =

Historic house in Mississippi, United States

- U.S. National Register of Historic Places
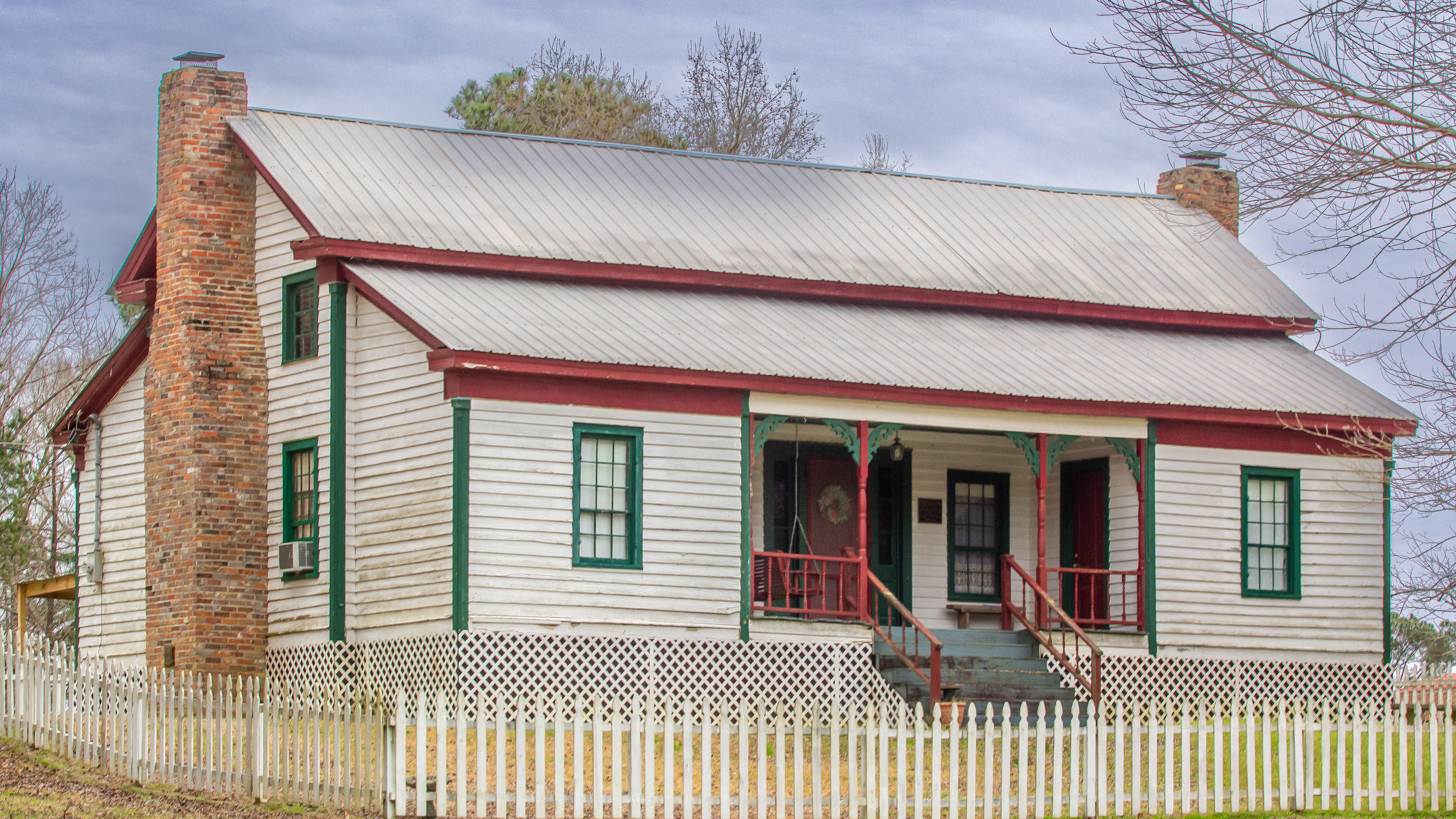

- Location within Mississippi Location within the United States
- Location: 2651 Townsend Rd, Dekalb, Mississippi
- Coordinates: 32°46′51″N 88°34′46″W
- Built: c. 1870
- Artist: "Mr. Mayer"
- Architectural style: Mid-nineteenth century vernacular
- NRHP reference No.: 94000643 (original); 16000283 (increase)

Significant dates
- Added to NRHP: June 24, 1994
- Moved: 2012
- Relisted on NRHP: May 17, 2016

The Perkins House in Dekalb, Mississippi is a historic structure listed on the National Register of Historic Places in 1994 for its architectural significance as a mid-nineteenth century example of a vernacular middle-class farmhouse as well as the artistic significance of the ornamental painting displayed throughout the interior of the house. The Perkins House was originally built around 1870, and the artwork was added in the 1890s. The house was originally located on Murphy Hardy Rd, northwest of its junction with Mississippi Highway 493 but was moved to its current location on Townsend Road in 2012 after being purchased by new owners.

== History ==
The exact construction date of the Perkins House is unknown, but the house probably dates from around 1870. The house's architecture is similar in style to many of the I-houses common in eastern Mississippi but is smaller than other more extravagant structures. As such, the house is reminiscent of the life of a typical modest-income late-nineteenth-century farmer in this region. The house was owned by a family known as the Dees before being purchased some time around the turn of the century by Burel Wilson (Wilse) and Sarah Elizabeth (Sally) Darnel Perkins. Wilse and Sally Perkins lived in the house until their deaths, upon which their son Sheldon Perkins and his wife Beatrice Perkins Koostra inherited the property, remaining there until the 1940s. The house was inhabited by George Cole from 1955 until 1991, after which time the house was abandoned. The house was listed on the National Register of Historic Places in 1994 and was later sold and moved from its original location in 2012 to its current location at 2709 Townsend Road. After the move, the Perkins House was relisted on the National Register in 2016.

== Significance ==
=== Architecture ===
The Perkins House is significant as an example of a mid-nineteenth century vernacular farmhouse associated with a middle-class family in the rural area of eastern Mississippi during this period. Though very similar in style to an I-house, a popular style in the region during this era, the floor plan deviates from the I-house standard in several features, most obviously the absence of an inhabitable second floor. The first floor layout consists of two 15 feet (4.6 m) by 17 feet (5.2 m) rooms divided by a central passageway. Shed style porches run the entire length of the front and rear facades and contain cabinet rooms in each corner. The centers of each of the porches are loggias; the rear one was originally open, but was closed in some time after 1994. The southwest cabinet room has an entrance from the front loggia but no entrance into the interior of the house while the northwest cabinet room opens into the northern main room but has no entrance from the loggia. The southeast cabinet room is a kitchen, and the northeast cabinet room is a bathroom which was originally open only to the northern main room but a second door was added into the rear loggia some time after 1994, possibly when the rear loggia was enclosed. Atop the first floor lies a small attic which was originally inaccessible, but a ship's ladder was installed after 2012 to provide access.

Each of the main rooms has two nine over six double-hung sash windows flanking a central chimney stack (each of which were rebuilt using original material after the move in 2012), and each of the cabinet rooms has a single double-hung nine over six window. Original hardware for shutters is still present on the exterior of the windows. The northern and southern sides of the building also each feature two fixed six-pane windows in the attic. Before the rear loggia was enclosed, both external doors were flanked by sidelights; when the rear was enclosed, the door was moved to the new rear entrance, but the sidelights were left intact. The exterior wall of the enclosed loggia contains 4 four over four double-hung sash windows which break the original symmetry of the facade. The front door and most of the interior doors contain four recessed panels, the door between the northern main room and the bathroom has five panels, and the door from the bathroom to the enclosed rear loggia is a modern six-panel door. The rear door present at the back of the central passageway when the house was listed on the National Register in 1994 did not include any panels and was likely not original. The current rear door of the enclosed loggia has four panels.

=== Interior artwork ===
The flooring and interior walls and ceilings are all constructed out of plain pine wood. Each of the fireplaces in the main rooms is topped by a wooden mantel adorned with ogee curves and flanked by wooden pilasters. A defining feature of the interior is the decorative paintings on many walls and ceilings of the two main rooms of the house. The southern room includes a twisted rope pattern as an artificial picture rail and a wainscot along the lower portion of the walls. The ceiling features a large square with a central circle of a different color. A rosette design surrounds a central lighting fixture, and tendrils emanate from the rosette about halfway to the edge of the circle. Tendrils also appear at each of the four corners of the square. A similar design is found in the northern room, with a central rosette and wainscoting.

The interior artwork is similar to that found in several other houses in the original location of the Perkins House, most notably the Oliver House in Moscow, Mississippi, also listed on the National Register in 1985. Other houses in that area which feature artwork similar to the Perkins House are the Shotts House and the now non-extant Cole House, the artwork of which is preserved in the Old Capitol Museum in Jackson, Mississippi. The close proximity and similar design of all of these pieces suggests they were the work of a single artist, and local wisdom attributes them all to a "Mr. Mayer", a German artist that passed through the area in the 1890s. No evidence is present of a larger collection of interior artwork anywhere in the state of Mississippi.
