= Giles, Mississippi =

- Unincorporated community
- Location within Mississippi Location within the United States
- Coordinates: 32°49′51.47″N 88°22′48.12″W
- Country: United States
- State: Mississippi
- County: Kemper
- Elevation: 203 ft (62 m)
- Time zone: UTC-6 (Central (CST))
  - Summer (DST): UTC-5 (CDT)
- GNIS feature ID: 691884

Giles is an unincorporated community in Kemper County, Mississippi, United States.

Giles is located on Mississippi Highway 16, east of Scooba.

== History ==
Jacob Giles built a plantation here in 1835.

A Mississippi historical marker is located at the Neville-Giles Cemetery in Giles.

The population in 1900 was 45.

== Notable people ==
- Shepherd S. Neville, planter and merchant in Giles; represented Sumter County, Alabama, in 1882 state legislature.
