= Porterville General Store =

- U.S. National Register of Historic Places
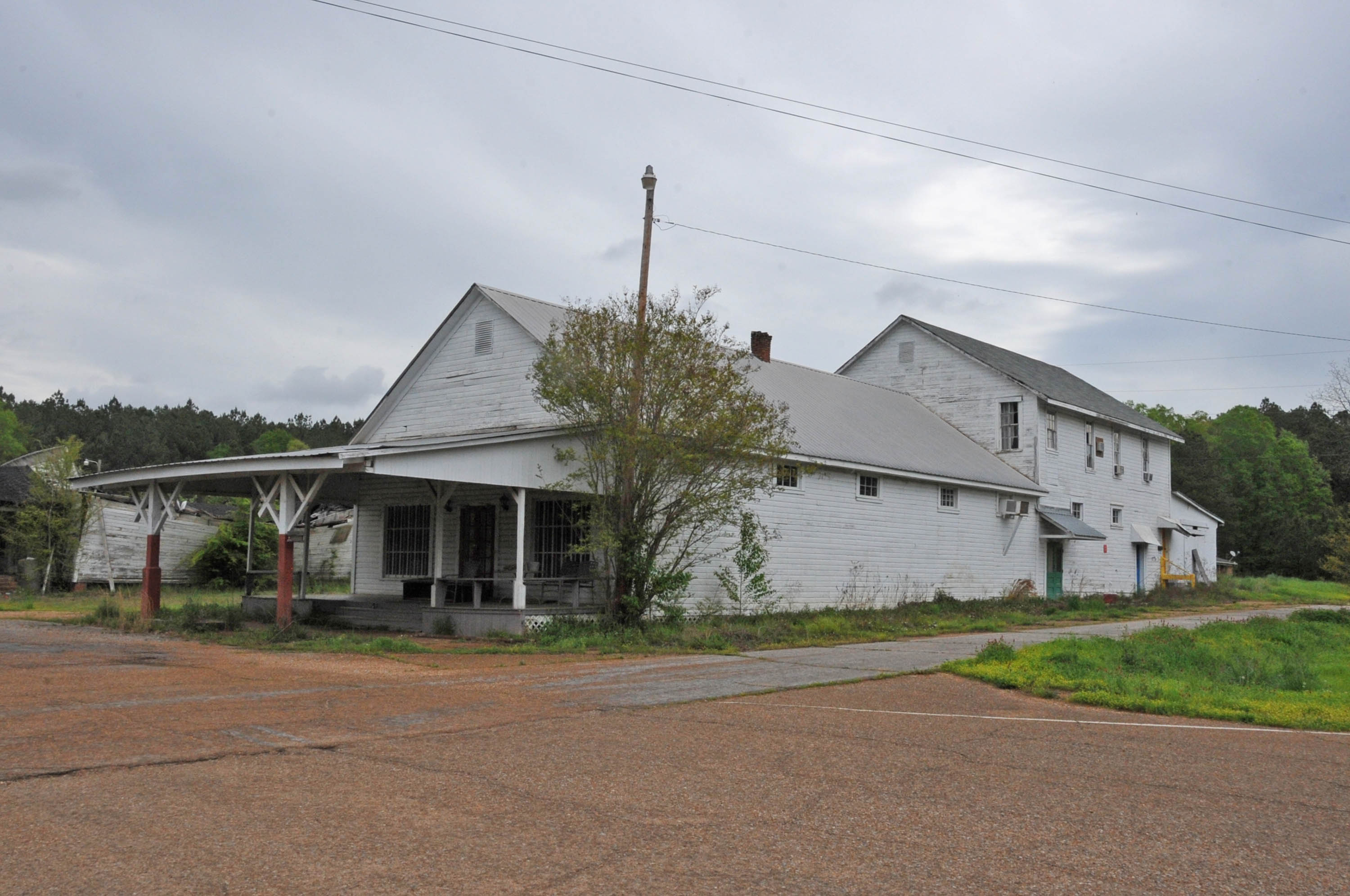

- Location within Mississippi Location within the United States
- Location: Old MS 45, Porterville, Mississippi
- Coordinates: 32°41′17″N 88°28′18″W
- Area: less than one acre
- Built: 1913
- NRHP reference No.: 06000195
- Added to NRHP: March 17, 2006

The Porterville General Store is a historic structure in Porterville, Kemper County, Mississippi. The wood-frame building on a brick foundation was constructed in 1913. Dr. W. F. Rogers built it to replace a previous store that burned. It was added to the National Register of Historic Places on March 17, 2006. The building is located on Old Mississippi Highway 45. It is now an art studio. It was near the Mobile and Ohio Railroad (M&O) line's station.

== See also ==
- National Register of Historic Places listings in Mississippi
