= Cullum, Mississippi =

- Unincorporated community
- Location within Mississippi Location within the United States
- Coordinates: 32°38′26″N 88°36′29″W
- Country: United States
- State: Mississippi
- County: Kemper
- Elevation: 253 ft (77 m)
- Time zone: UTC-6 (Central (CST))
  - Summer (DST): UTC-5 (CDT)
- Area codes: 601 and 769
- GNIS feature ID: 691794

Cullum is an unincorporated community in Kemper County, Mississippi, United States. A post office operated under the name Cullum from 1895 to 1914. In 1900, Cullum's population was 24.
