= Zion Baptist Church (Collinsville, Mississippi) =

Historic church in Mississippi, United States

- U.S. National Register of Historic Places
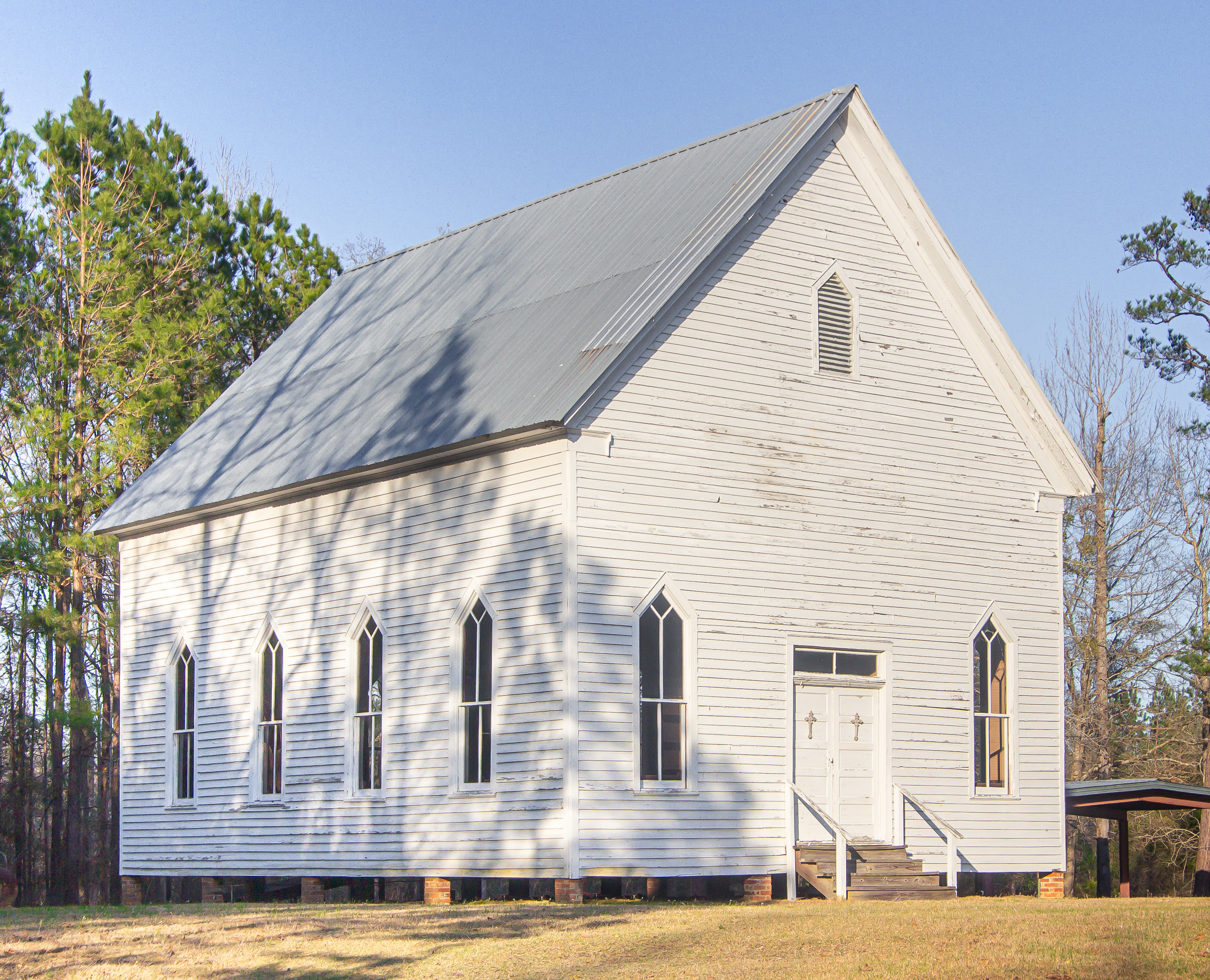
- Zion Baptist Church in 2022

- Location within Mississippi Location within the United States
- Nearest city: Collinsville, Mississippi
- Coordinates: 32°36′32″N 88°52′53″W
- Built: 1910-11
- Architect: Roland Greenberry Skinner
- Architectural style: Carpenter Gothic
- NRHP reference No.: 02001497
- Added to NRHP: December 12, 2002

Zion Baptist Church in Collinsville, Mississippi is a Carpenter Gothic church built in 1910–11. It was listed on the National Register of Historic Places (NRHP) in 2002.

According to its NRHP nomination, it was deemed significant "because of the quality of its architectural detail as a rural, vernacular church built during the early 1900s, and its unusually high degree of integrity."

The church building replaced a previous building on the site.

Its 6-acre (2.4 ha) property includes a cemetery with graves of immigrants from about 1860 on, including from England, Scotland, and Ireland. An African-American cemetery also associated with the church is outside the listed property, accessed through a fence.
