= Tamola, Mississippi =

- Unincorporated community
- Location within Mississippi Location within the United States
- Coordinates: 32°35′12″N 88°28′37″W
- Country: United States
- State: Mississippi
- County: Kemper
- Elevation: 229 ft (70 m)
- Time zone: UTC-6 (Central (CST))
  - Summer (DST): UTC-5 (CDT)
- GNIS feature ID: 692255

Tamola is an unincorporated community that is located in Kemper County, in the U.S. state of Mississippi.

== History ==
Tamola is a name derived from the Choctaw language, purported to mean "to scatter". A variant name is "Tamola Station".

In 1856, the Mobile and Ohio Railroad laid track through Tamola. On April 12, 1858, a train station was opened in the community. A post office was opened on April 29, 1959 under the name Tamola Station from 1858 to 1879 and under the name Tamola from 1903 to 1924.

Tamola is located on the CPKC Railroad ex Kansas City Southern Railway.

Tamola was once home to a Catholic church of the Diocese of Natchez and was served by clergy from Meridian.
