= Wahalak, Mississippi =

- Unincorporated community
- Location in Mississippi and the United States Wahalak (the United States)
- Coordinates: 32°54′20″N 88°31′47″W
- Country: United States
- State: Mississippi
- County: Kemper
- Elevation: 187 ft (57 m)
- Time zone: UTC-6 (Central (CST))
  - Summer (DST): UTC-5 (CDT)
- GNIS feature ID: 692299

Wahalak is a small unincorporated community in central Kemper County, Mississippi, United States.

== History ==
The community is named for Wahalak Creek. Wahalak likely comes from a Choctaw word meaning "to spread".

The community was originally founded in 1837 on Wahalak Creek three miles east of the present location and had a bank and male and female academies. The Wahalak Female Academy first opened in 1839. The original community was located on the 1842 post road. After the founding of the Mobile and Ohio Railroad, most of the town's inhabitants and businesses moved to be closer to the railroad. The new community was then named Wahalak Station and the original community became known as Old Wahalak.

By August 1856, The Mobile and Ohio Railroad had laid track through Wahalak. A post office and train station were opened April 19th, 1860.

Wahalak is located on the Kansas City Southern Railway. A post office operated under the name Wahalak Station from 1860 to 1871 and under the name Wahalak from 1873 to 1951.

In late December 1906, Wahalak and Scooba, Mississippi, were the sites of white rioting against African-Americans. In the various conflicts, a total of twelve African-Americans and two whites were killed by December 26. The county sheriff called in the state militia for assistance.

The murderer Kenny Wagner was captured in Wahalak on January 30, 1956.
