= Porterville, Mississippi =

- Census-designated place
- Location in Mississippi and the United States Porterville (the United States)
- Coordinates: 32°41′16″N 88°28′20″W
- Country: United States
- State: Mississippi
- County: Kemper

Area
  - Total: 0.39 sq mi (1.01 km^{2})
  - Land: 0.39 sq mi (1.01 km^{2})
  - Water: 0 sq mi (0.00 km^{2})
- Elevation: 200 ft (61 m)

Population (2020)
  - Total: 34
  - Density: 88/sq mi (33.8/km^{2})
- Time zone: UTC-6 (Central (CST))
  - Summer (DST): UTC-5 (CDT)
- ZIP codes: 39352
- FIPS code: 28-59520
- GNIS feature ID: 676260

Porterville (also Maryville) is a census-designated place and unincorporated community in Kemper County, Mississippi. As of the 2020 census, Porterville had a population of 34. It lies a slight distance away from U.S. Route 45 southeast of the city of De Kalb, the county seat of Kemper County. Its elevation is 200 feet (61 m). It has a post office with the ZIP code 39352. It is adjacent to Lake Porterville.

== Demographics ==
Historical population
Census	Pop.	Note	%±
2020	34		—
U.S. Decennial Census

== History ==
By August 1856, the Mobile and Ohio Railroad had laid track through Porterville. On May 24, 1890, a post office was opened in Porterville, likely coinciding with a train station being opened around the same time.

Porterville was named for the first postmaster, Willie N. Porter.

The community is located on the CPKC Railroad ex Kansas City Southern Railway Porterville was once home to several stores and in 1906 had a population of 200.

The Porterville General Store is listed on the National Register of Historical Places.

== Education ==
The Kemper County School District is the sole school district of the county.

East Mississippi Community College is the community college of Kemper County.

== Notable people ==
- Clay Hopper, former professional baseball player and member of the International League Hall of Fame
- Devonta Pollard, professional basketball player
