= Wildhorse Creek (Texas) =

River in Howard County, Texas, USA

- Location within Texas

Location
- Country: United States of America
- State: Texas
- County: Howard County

Physical characteristics
- Mouth: Morgan Creek
  - coordinates: 32.4037°N 101.2351°W

Wildhorse Creek in Howard County, Texas is a tributary of Morgan Creek. It flows near Wildhorse Mountain.
