= Lost Horse Creek =

Stream in Mississippi, U.S.

Coordinates: 32°30′28.5″N 88°36′37.2″W

Lost Horse Creek also known as Wild Horse Creek and Wildhorse Creek is a stream in the U.S. state of Mississippi.
