= Sucarnoochee, Mississippi =

- Unincorporated community
- Location within Mississippi Location within the United States
- Coordinates: 32°43′52″N 88°28′23″W
- Country: United States
- State: Mississippi
- County: Kemper
- Elevation: 223 ft (68 m)
- Time zone: UTC-6 (Central (CST))
  - Summer (DST): UTC-5 (CDT)
- GNIS feature ID: 678379

Sucarnoochee is an unincorporated community in Kemper County, Mississippi, United States. Its post office has been closed. It was also known as Sucarnooche.

The community was named from its location near the Sucarnoochee River.

== History ==
By August 1856, the Mobile and Ohio Railroad had laid track through Sucarnoochee. The post office and presumably a train station were opened August 29, 1860 under the spelling Sucarnochee.

Sucarnoochee is located on the CPKC Railroad former Kansas City Southern Railway. In 1900, Sucarnoochee's population was 92.
