= Scooba, Mississippi =

Town in Mississippi, United States

- Town
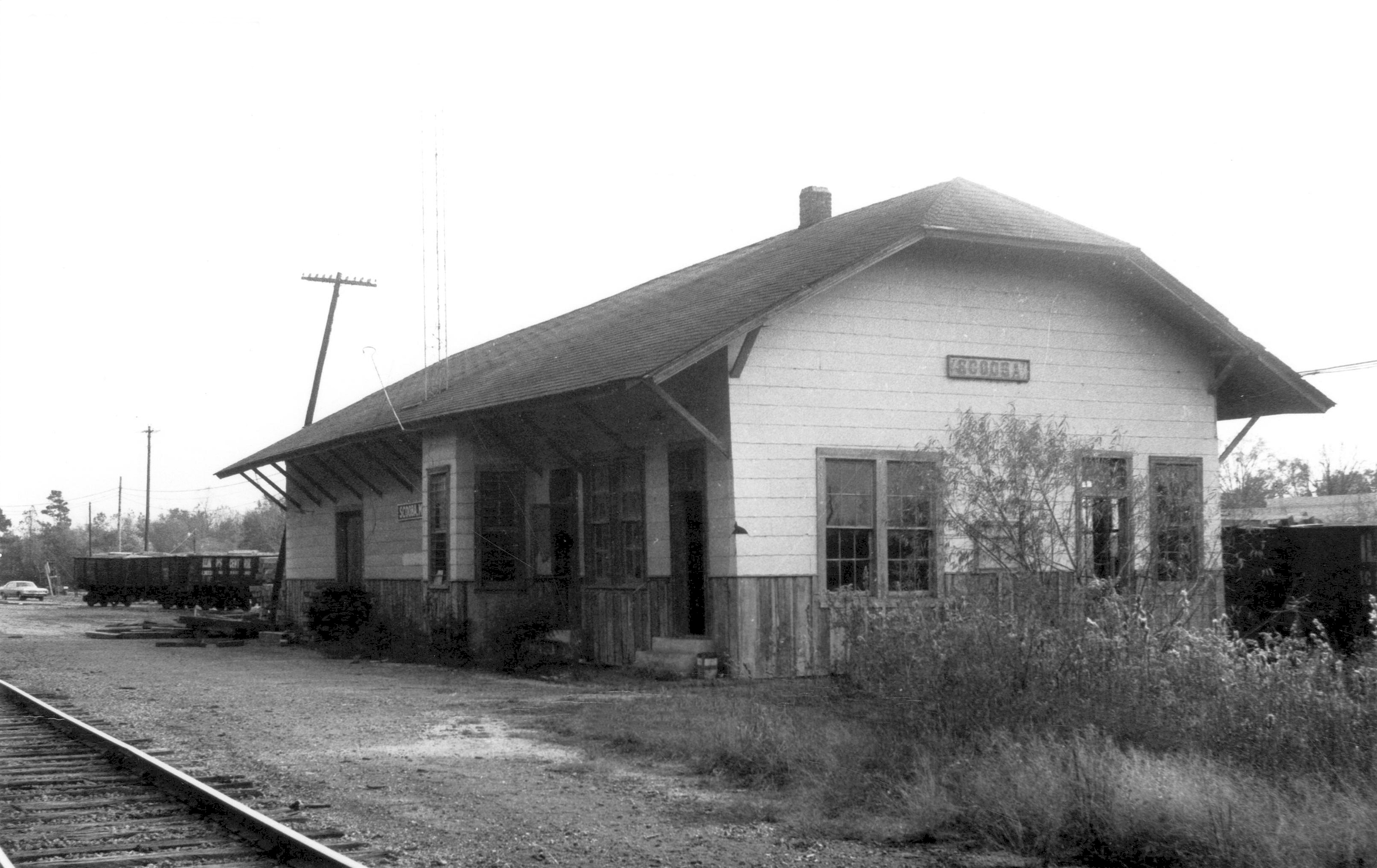
- Scooba railway station in 1975

- Flag Logo

- Location in Kemper county and Mississippi

- Location in the United States
- Coordinates: 32°49′41.5″N 88°28′35.1″W
- Country: United States
- State: Mississippi
- County: Kemper
- District: 1
- Founded: December 13, 1858
- Incorporated: April 9, 1873
- Named for: Choctaw: scooba ("Reed brake")

Government
  - Type: Mayor–Council
  - Mayor: Craig N. Nave Sr. (I)
  - Council: Board of Aldermen

Area
  - Total: 2.48 sq mi (6.42 km^{2})
  - Land: 2.48 sq mi (6.42 km^{2})
  - Water: 0 sq mi (0.00 km^{2})
- Elevation: 213 ft (65 m)

Population (2020)
  - Total: 744
  - Density: 300.1/sq mi (115.88/km^{2})
- Time zone: UTC-6 (Central (CST))
  - Summer (DST): UTC-5 (CDT)
- ZIP code: 39358
- Area code: 662
- FIPS code: 28-66160
- GNIS feature ID: 677458
- Highways: U.S. Highway 45; Highway 16
- Major airport: Jackson Airport (JAN)
- Website: townofscooba.net

Scooba is a town in Kemper County, Mississippi, United States. Founded in 1858, the population was 744 as of the 2020 Census.

== Etymology ==
Scooba is a Choctaw word meaning "reed brake" (i.e., a farming tool used on reeds), and the early settlement was noted for its productive farmland.

== History ==
The first permanent settlement at Scooba was made in the 1830s.

A post office was opened on March 9th, 1836 named Scoober.

By August 1856, the Mobile and Ohio Railroad had built a line through Scooba. A station had been opened by December 13, 1858, corresponding to the opening of the new post office.

A Democratic weekly newspaper, The Kemper Herald, was established in Scooba in 1876. By the early 1900s, Scooba had several residential homes, a hotel, a livery barn, a post office, two saw milling plants, a cotton gin, a general store, five churches (three white and two colored), a school, and a bank (the Bank of Kemper, established in 1904). Scooba was a local market for cotton.

In late December 1906, Scooba and Wahalak, Mississippi, were the sites of white rioting against blacks. In the various conflicts, which started with confrontations between passengers and conductors on the railroad, a total of 12 blacks and two whites were killed by December 26. The county sheriff called in the state militia for assistance. The events were covered by national newspapers.

== Geography ==
According to the United States Census Bureau, the town has a total area of 2.5 square miles (6.5 km^{2}), all land. Scooba is adjacent to U.S. Route 45, Mississippi Highway 16, and a railroad. It is 35 miles (56 km) north of Meridian and 50 miles (80 km) south of Columbus.

== Demographics ==
Historical population
Census	Pop.	Note	%±
1900	286		—
1910	322		12.6%
1920	700		117.4%
1930	933		33.3%
1940	606		−35.0%
1950	734		21.1%
1960	513		−30.1%
1970	626		22.0%
1980	511		−18.4%
1990	541		5.9%
2000	632		16.8%
2010	732		15.8%
2020	744		1.6%
U.S. Decennial Census

=== Racial and ethnic composition ===
Scooba town, Mississippi – Racial and ethnic composition Note: the US Census treats Hispanic/Latino as an ethnic category. This table excludes Latinos from the racial categories and assigns them to a separate category. Hispanics/Latinos may be of any race.
Race / Ethnicity (NH = Non-Hispanic)	Pop 2000	Pop 2010	Pop 2020	% 2000	% 2010	% 2020
White alone (NH)	280	240	186	44.30%	32.79%	25.00%
Black or African American alone (NH)	343	477	539	54.27%	65.16%	72.45%
Native American or Alaska Native alone (NH)	0	3	11	0.00%	0.41%	1.48%
Asian alone (NH)	0	0	0	0.00%	0.00%	0.00%
Native Hawaiian or Pacific Islander alone (NH)	0	0	0	0.00%	0.00%	0.00%
Other race alone (NH)	0	0	3	0.00%	0.00%	0.40%
Mixed race or Multiracial (NH)	4	5	1	0.63%	0.68%	0.13%
Hispanic or Latino (any race)	5	7	4	0.79%	0.96%	0.54%
Total	632	732	744	100.00%	100.00%	100.00%

=== 2020 census ===
As of the 2020 United States census, there were 744 people, 191 households, and 107 families residing in the town.

=== 2000 census ===
As of the census of 2000, there were 632 people, 204 households, and 139 families residing in the town. The population density was 257.3 inhabitants per square mile (99.3/km^{2}). There were 244 housing units at an average density of 99.3 per square mile (38.3/km^{2}). The racial makeup of the town was 54.91% African American, 44.30% White, 0.16% from other races, and 0.63% from two or more races. Hispanic or Latino of any race were 0.79% of the population.

There were 204 households, out of which 38.2% had children under the age of 18 living with them, 38.7% were married couples living together, 27.9% had a female householder with no husband present, and 31.4% were non-families. 30.4% of all households were made up of individuals, and 10.8% had someone living alone who was 65 years of age or older. The average household size was 2.47 and the average family size was 3.09.

In the town, the population was spread out, with 23.6% under the age of 18, 29.7% from 18 to 24, 19.5% from 25 to 44, 17.4% from 45 to 64, and 9.8% who were 65 years of age or older. The median age was 22 years. For every 100 females, there were 127.3 males. For every 100 females age 18 and over, there were 134.5 males.

The median income for a household in the town was $18,875, and the median income for a family was $31,375. Males had a median income of $30,500 versus $29,063 for females. The per capita income for the town was $12,110. About 30.3% of families and 25.5% of the population were below the poverty line, including 27.2% of those under age 18 and 15.0% of those age 65 or over.

== Education ==
The Town of Scooba is served by the Kemper County School District, the sole school district of the county.

East Mississippi Community College is the community college of Kemper County. The main campus of EMCC, including the college system's administrative headquarters, is in Scooba. EMCC was featured on the Netflix documentary Last Chance U, which chronicled their 2015 and 2016 football seasons.

== Notable people ==
- Abner M. Aust - United States Air Force officer and World War II flying ace.
- Kevin Granger - professional basketball player.
- Charles Jones - played four seasons in the National Basketball Association.
- John J. Pettus - 23rd Governor of Mississippi; moved to Scooba at age 22.
