= Kemper County, Mississippi =

County in Mississippi, United States

- County
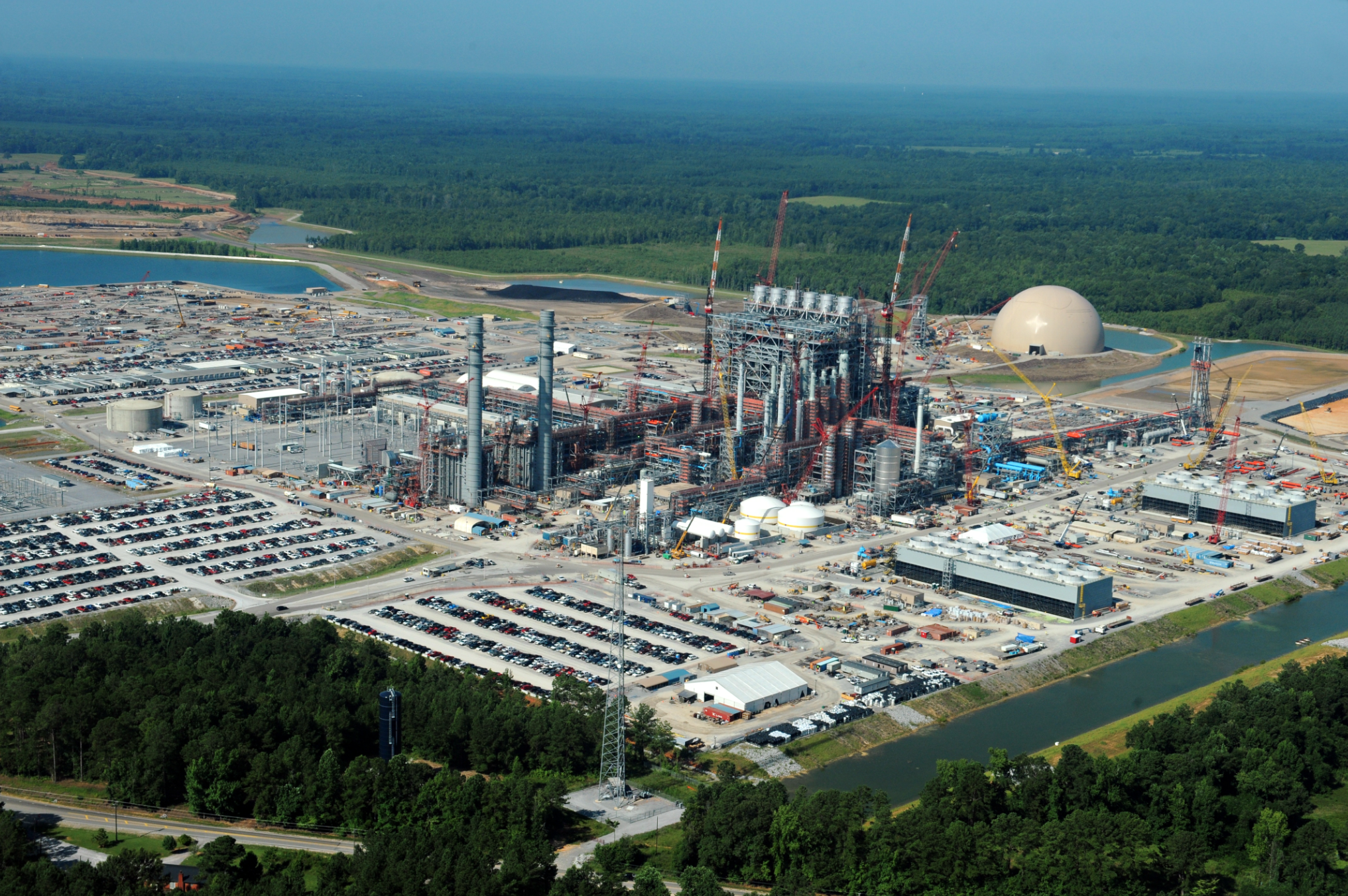
- The Kemper Project power plant

- Location within the U.S. state of Mississippi
- Coordinates: 32°46′N 88°39′W
- Country: United States
- State: Mississippi
- Founded: 1833
- Named for: Reuben Kemper
- Seat: De Kalb
- Largest Town: De Kalb

Area
  - Total: 767 sq mi (1,990 km^{2})
  - Land: 766 sq mi (1,980 km^{2})
  - Water: 0.8 sq mi (2.1 km^{2}) 0.1%

Population (2020)
  - Total: 8,988
  - Estimate (2025): 8,600 ▼
  - Density: 11.7/sq mi (4.53/km^{2})
- Time zone: UTC−6 (Central)
  - Summer (DST): UTC−5 (CDT)
- Congressional district: 3rd
- Website: www.kempercounty.ms

Kemper County is a county located on the central eastern border of the U.S. state of Mississippi. As of the 2020 census, the population was 8,988. Its county seat is De Kalb. The county is named in honor of Reuben Kemper.

The county is part of the Meridian, MS Micropolitan Statistical Area. In 2010 the Mississippi Public Service Commission approved construction of the Kemper Project, designed to use "clean coal" to produce electricity for 23 counties in the eastern part of the state. As of February 2017, it was not completed and had cost overruns. It is designed as a model project to use gasification and carbon-capture technologies at this scale.

East Mississippi Community College is located in Kemper County in the town of Scooba, at the junction of US 45 and Mississippi Highway 16.

== History ==
In the wake of the county's founding, Abel Mastin Key served as the first circuit clerk. Land in the area was developed in the 19th century by white planters for cotton cultivation using enslaved African Americans. Blacks have comprised the majority of the county population since before the American Civil War. The county continues to be largely rural.

After the American Civil War and Reconstruction, racial violence increased as whites struggled to regain power over the majority population of freedmen and to suppress their voting. In the period from 1877 to 1950, Kemper County had 24 documented lynchings of African Americans, the third-highest of Mississippi counties. Hinds and Leflore counties had 29 and 48 lynchings, respectively, in this period. This form of racial terrorism was at its height in the decades around the turn of the 20th century, which followed the state's disenfranchisement of most blacks in 1890 through creating barriers to voter registration.

In 1877 the Chisolm Massacre occurred, the murder by a mob of a judge, his children, and two of their friends while they were in protective custody in jail.

In 1890, blacks made up the majority of the county' population: 10,084 blacks to 7,845 whites. They generally worked as sharecroppers or tenant farmers. Often illiterate, many of the sharecroppers were at a disadvantage in the annual accounting that was done by the landowners. Sometimes the planters had grocery stores on their property and required the sharecroppers to buy all their goods there, adding to their debt.

Beginning in late December 1906, there were several days of racial terror in the county. After violent incidents on the railroad between conductors and black passengers, whites attacked blacks at the rural towns of Wahalak and Scooba; by December 27, whites had killed a total of 13 blacks in rioting. The events started with a physical confrontation between a conductor and an African-American man on a Mobile & Ohio Railroad train. The conductor was cut, and he fatally shot two black men. George Simpson, another African American thought to be involved, escaped from the train. When captured in Wahalak by a posse, he killed a white constable and was quickly lynched by the other whites.

As reported by The New York Times,

Not satisfied with the punishment of this man, the whites immediately set out to strike terror into the negroes, who had been getting defiant of late. They found two sons of Simpson and lynched them, filling their bodies with bullets. Two other negroes who had behaved defiantly were treated in similar fashion.

Whites worried about blacks gathering to take revenge at Wahalak, where they had already been abused by lynchings. Local authorities called for state militia. Their commanding officer took his troops away from Wahalak, although there was still unrest, because he felt they were not being treated properly.

By the end of the day on December 26, white men in Scooba had killed another five black men. The county sheriff arrested several whites for these murders, and called for the state militia to go to Scooba. "All the men killed at Scooba today are said to be innocent of any crime, having been shot down merely as a matter of revenge by the rough whites." There had been a conflict on another train, in which a black man mortally shot a conductor, George Harrison. The yardmaster shot and killed the African American. The rioting by whites in Scooba started after Harrison died. Governor James K. Vardaman went to Scooba with militia to establish control. He left a force of 20 there commanded by Adjutant General Fridge and returned to the state capital on the evening of December 27. That day the body of another murdered African-American man was found in the woods, bringing the total killed in Scooba to six.

In 1934, three African-American suspects in Kemper County were repeatedly whipped in order to force them to confess to murder. In Brown v. Mississippi (1936), the U.S. Supreme Court unanimously ruled such forced confessions violated the Due Process Clause of the Fourteenth Amendment, and were inadmissible at trial.

The peak of population in the rural county was in 1930. Mechanization of agriculture decreased the need for farm labor. From 1940 to 1970, the population declined markedly, as may be seen on the table below, as people moved to other areas for work. This was also the period of the second wave of the Great Migration, when 5 million African Americans moved out of the South to the North and especially to the West Coast, where the defense industry had many jobs, beginning during World War II.

== Geography ==
According to the U.S. Census Bureau, the county has a total area of 767 square miles (1,990 km^{2}), of which 766 square miles (1,980 km^{2}) is land and 0.8 square miles (2.1 km^{2}) (0.1%) is water.

=== Major highways ===
- U.S. Highway 45
- Mississippi Highway 16
- Mississippi Highway 21
- Mississippi Highway 39

=== Adjacent counties ===
- Noxubee County (north)
- Sumter County, Alabama (east)
- Lauderdale County (south)
- Neshoba County (west)
- Winston County (northwest)

== Demographics ==
Historical population
Census	Pop.	Note	%±
1840	7,663		—
1850	12,517		63.3%
1860	11,682		−6.7%
1870	12,920		10.6%
1880	15,719		21.7%
1890	17,961		14.3%
1900	20,492		14.1%
1910	20,348		−0.7%
1920	19,619		−3.6%
1930	21,881		11.5%
1940	21,867		−0.1%
1950	15,893		−27.3%
1960	12,277		−22.8%
1970	10,233		−16.6%
1980	10,148		−0.8%
1990	10,356		2.0%
2000	10,453		0.9%
2010	10,456		0.0%
2020	8,988		−14.0%
2025 (est.)	8,600	▼	−4.3%
U.S. Decennial Census; 1790-1960 1900-1990; 1990-2000 2010-2013

=== Racial and ethnic composition ===
Kemper County, Mississippi – Racial and ethnic composition Note: the US Census treats Hispanic/Latino as an ethnic category. This table excludes Latinos from the racial categories and assigns them to a separate category. Hispanics/Latinos may be of any race.
Race / Ethnicity (NH = Non-Hispanic)	Pop 1980	Pop 1990	Pop 2000	Pop 2010	Pop 2020	% 1980	% 1990	% 2000	% 2010	% 2020
White alone (NH)	4,538	4,395	4,068	3,665	2,812	44.72%	42.44%	38.92%	35.05%	31.29%
Black or African American alone (NH)	5,436	5,721	6,028	6,273	5,486	53.57%	55.24%	57.67%	59.99%	61.04%
Native American or Alaska Native alone (NH)	72	200	213	385	460	0.71%	1.93%	2.04%	3.68%	5.12%
Asian alone (NH)	6	8	8	10	6	0.06%	0.08%	0.08%	0.10%	0.07%
Native Hawaiian or Pacific Islander alone (NH)	x	x	0	0	1	x	x	0.00%	0.00%	0.01%
Other race alone (NH)	1	0	4	1	13	0.01%	0.00%	0.04%	0.01%	0.14%
Mixed race or Multiracial (NH)	x	x	56	70	143	x	x	0.54%	0.67%	1.59%
Hispanic or Latino (any race)	95	32	76	52	67	0.94%	0.31%	0.73%	0.50%	0.75%
Total	10,148	10,356	10,453	10,456	8,988	100.00%	100.00%	100.00%	100.00%	100.00%

=== 2020 census ===
As of the 2020 census, the county had a population of 8,988. The median age was 40.4 years. 20.2% of residents were under the age of 18 and 19.8% of residents were 65 years of age or older. For every 100 females there were 101.7 males, and for every 100 females age 18 and over there were 101.4 males age 18 and over.

The racial makeup of the county was 31.4% White, 61.1% Black or African American, 5.2% American Indian and Alaska Native, 0.1% Asian, 0.1% Native Hawaiian and Pacific Islander, 0.3% from some other race, and 1.9% from two or more races. Hispanic or Latino residents of any race comprised 0.7% of the population.

<0.1% of residents lived in urban areas, while 100.0% lived in rural areas.

There were 3,385 households in the county, of which 27.7% had children under the age of 18 living in them. Of all households, 36.1% were married-couple households, 22.6% were households with a male householder and no spouse or partner present, and 36.9% were households with a female householder and no spouse or partner present. About 31.4% of all households were made up of individuals and 14.6% had someone living alone who was 65 years of age or older.

There were 3,909 housing units, of which 13.4% were vacant. Among occupied housing units, 77.5% were owner-occupied and 22.5% were renter-occupied. The homeowner vacancy rate was 0.8% and the rental vacancy rate was 6.1%.

=== 2010 census ===
As of the 2010 United States census, there were 10,456 people living in the county. 60.1% were Black or African American, 35.3% White, 3.7% Native American, 0.1% Asian, 0.1% of some other race and 0.7% of two or more races. 0.5% were Hispanic or Latino (of any race).

=== 2000 census ===
As of the census of 2000, there were 10,453 people, 3,909 households, and 2,787 families living in the county. The population density was 14 people per square mile (5.4 people/km^{2}). There were 4,533 housing units at an average density of 6 units per square mile (2.3 units/km^{2}). The racial makeup of the county was 58.13% Black or African American, 39.03% White, 2.06% Native American, 0.08% Asian, 0.03% Pacific Islander, 0.11% from other races, and 0.57% from two or more races. 0.73% of the population were Hispanic or Latino of any race.

There were 3,909 households, out of which 32.20% had children under the age of 18 living with them, 46.70% were married couples living together, 20.20% had a female householder with no husband present, and 28.70% were non-families. 26.40% of all households were made up of individuals, and 12.60% had someone living alone who was 65 years of age or older. The average household size was 2.57 and the average family size was 3.11.

In the county, the population was spread out, with 25.40% under the age of 18, 12.50% from 18 to 24, 25.20% from 25 to 44, 21.80% from 45 to 64, and 15.10% who were 65 years of age or older. The median age was 35 years. For every 100 females there were 92.20 males. For every 100 females age 18 and over, there were 88.30 males.

The median income for a household in the county was $23,998, and the median income for a family was $30,248. Males had a median income of $24,431 versus $18,199 for females. The per capita income for the county was $11,985. About 21.20% of families and 26.00% of the population were below the poverty line, including 35.30% of those under age 18 and 26.70% of those age 65 or over.

== Education ==
There is one school district in the county: Kemper County School District.

Kemper County is within the service area of the East Mississippi Community College system. The main campus of EMCC, including the college system's administrative headquarters, is in the Scooba Campus in Scooba.

== Government ==
The county is governed by a five-member elected Board of Supervisors, who are elected from single-member districts. The County Sheriff, Chancery Clerk, Circuit Clerk, and Tax Assessor are also elected to office.

Kemper County generally votes for candidates of the Democratic Party; the Republican presidential nominee has won it only four times in the past century.

United States presidential election results for Kemper County, Mississippi
Year	Republican		Democratic		Third party(ies)	
Year	No.	%	No.	%	No.	%
1912	20	2.20%	828	90.99%	62	6.81%
1916	71	6.91%	939	91.34%	18	1.75%
1920	129	8.31%	1,397	90.01%	26	1.68%
1924	56	5.79%	911	94.21%	0	0.00%
1928	141	9.03%	1,421	90.97%	0	0.00%
1932	27	1.86%	1,420	98.00%	2	0.14%
1936	8	0.54%	1,477	99.46%	0	0.00%
1940	42	2.87%	1,422	97.13%	0	0.00%
1944	37	2.68%	1,345	97.32%	0	0.00%
1948	29	1.91%	98	6.46%	1,390	91.63%
1952	372	18.93%	1,593	81.07%	0	0.00%
1956	173	9.49%	1,586	87.00%	64	3.51%
1960	193	11.28%	931	54.41%	587	34.31%
1964	2,185	91.96%	191	8.04%	0	0.00%
1968	167	4.98%	655	19.54%	2,530	75.48%
1972	2,748	75.25%	837	22.92%	67	1.83%
1976	1,680	40.38%	2,436	58.56%	44	1.06%
1980	1,822	41.05%	2,601	58.59%	16	0.36%
1984	2,354	52.83%	2,089	46.88%	13	0.29%
1988	2,128	50.25%	2,069	48.85%	38	0.90%
1992	1,830	41.96%	2,243	51.43%	288	6.60%
1996	1,439	38.93%	2,048	55.41%	209	5.65%
2000	1,915	44.94%	2,311	54.24%	35	0.82%
2004	2,109	45.82%	2,465	53.55%	29	0.63%
2008	1,935	37.05%	3,256	62.34%	32	0.61%
2012	1,789	35.41%	3,239	64.11%	24	0.48%
2016	1,778	38.33%	2,827	60.94%	34	0.73%
2020	1,787	37.77%	2,887	61.02%	57	1.20%
2024	1,691	41.39%	2,381	58.27%	14	0.34%

== Electric power plant ==
In 2010, the Mississippi Public Service Commission approved the construction of a lignite coal plant in Kemper County to be financed by electricity customers in twenty-three southeastern Mississippi counties being served by Mississippi Power Company. It is designed as a model project to use gasification and carbon-capture technologies at this scale.

The plant was strongly opposed by former Republican State Chairman Clarke Reed of Greenville, who favored a less-expensive natural gas-fueled plant. Reed called the project "... a horrible thing." He said it would be a political issue that could be used against Republicans for years.

The Kemper Project was scheduled to open in the third quarter of 2016, more than two years behind schedule. Its cost increased to $6.6 billion—three times original cost estimate. As of February 2017, the project was still not in service, and the cost had increased to $7.1 billion.

== Communities ==
=== Towns ===
- De Kalb (county seat)
- Scooba

=== Census-designated places ===
- Bogue Chitto (mostly in Neshoba County)
- Porterville

=== Unincorporated communities ===
- Cullum
- Electric Mills
- Giles
- Moscow
- Preston
- Sucarnoochee
- Tamola
- Wahalak

=== Ghost town ===
- Binnsville
- Minden

== Notable residents ==
- Eddie Briggs, 28th Lt. Governor of Mississippi
- Bud Brown, former pro football player, was born in DeKalb
- Clay Hopper, professional baseball player
- Sampson Jackson, served in the Mississippi State Senate, was born in Preston
- Al Key, aviator, Mayor of Meridian, Mississippi (1965-1973)
- Fred Key, aviator, broke aviation endurance record in 1935 with brother Al
- John J. Pettus, 23rd Governor of Mississippi, previously represented Kemper County in the Mississippi House of Representatives and the Mississippi State Senate
- Devonta Pollard, professional basketball player
- J.H. Rush, who founded the first private hospital in Meridian
- John C. Stennis, who served as United States Senator from 1947 to 1988, was born in Kemper County

== See also ==
- National Register of Historic Places listings in Kemper County, Mississippi
- USS Kemper County (LST-854)
