= Kemper County School District =

School district in Mississippi

Address
- 159 Main Avenue DeKalb, Mississippi, 39328; United States

District information
- Type: Public
- Grades: PreK–12
- Superintendent: Dr. Hilute Hudson
- Budget: $18,000,000 (2021-22)
- NCES District ID: 2802310

Students and staff
- Students: 895 (2023-24)
- Teachers: 100.00 (FTE)
- Staff: 132.55
- Student–teacher ratio: 8.95

Other information
- Website: www.kempercountyschools.org

The Kemper County School District is a public school district based in De Kalb, Mississippi, United States. The district's boundaries parallel that of Kemper County.

== Schools ==
Comprehensive campuses

- Kemper County Middle & High School (De Kalb, Grades 7-12)
- Kemper County Elementary School (De Kalb, Grades PK-5)
  - Construction was scheduled to finish in December 2023. It was scheduled to open in Spring 2024. It has a multipurpose room and a storm shelter.

Alternative and other

- Kemper County Success School (De Kalb)
- John C. Stennis CTE Vocational Complex (De Kalb)

Former schools

- Kemper County Upper Elementary School (De Kalb, Grades PreK and 4-6)
- Kemper County Lower Elementary School (Scooba; Grades K-3)
- East Kemper Elementary School (Scooba; Grades PK-6)
- West Kemper Elementary School (De Kalb; Grades PK-6)

== Demographics ==
=== 2006-07 school year ===
There were a total of 1,321 students enrolled in the Kemper County School District during the 2006–2007 school year. The gender makeup of the district was 49% female and 51% male. The racial makeup of the district was 98.03% African American, 1.59% White, 0.23% Hispanic, and 0.15% Native American. 81.5% of the district's students were eligible to receive free lunch.

=== Previous school years ===
School Year	Enrollment	Gender Makeup		Racial Makeup				
School Year	Enrollment	Female	Male	Asian	African American	Hispanic	Native American	White
2005-06	1,357	49%	51%	–	98.01%	0.15%	0.15%	1.69%
2004-05	1,333	48%	52%	–	97.22%	0.08%	0.15%	2.55%
2003-04	1,338	49%	51%	0.07%	97.01%	0.07%	–	2.84%
2002-03	1,363	49%	51%	0.22%	97.21%	0.07%	0.07%	2.42%

== Accountability statistics ==
	2006-07	2005-06	2004-05	2003-04	2002-03
District Accreditation Status	Accredited	Accredited	Accredited	Accredited	Accredited
School Performance Classifications
Level 5 (Superior Performing) Schools	0	0	0	0	0
Level 4 (Exemplary) Schools	0	1	1	0	0
Level 3 (Successful) Schools	1	2	2	3	1
Level 2 (Under Performing) Schools	2	0	0	0	2
Level 1 (Low Performing) Schools	0	0	0	0	0
Not Assigned	0	0	0	0	0

== See also ==
- List of school districts in Mississippi
