= De Kalb, Mississippi =

- Town
- Nickname: Dynamite City of the South
- Location of De Kalb, Mississippi

- Location in the United States
- Coordinates: 32°46′11″N 88°39′1″W
- Country: United States
- State: Mississippi
- County: Kemper
- Named after: Johann de Kalb

Government
  - Mayor: Clark Adams

Area
  - Total: 3.32 sq mi (8.61 km^{2})
  - Land: 3.32 sq mi (8.60 km^{2})
  - Water: 0.0077 sq mi (0.02 km^{2})
- Elevation: 466 ft (142 m)

Population (2020)
  - Total: 877
  - Density: 264.3/sq mi (102.03/km^{2})
- Time zone: UTC-6 (Central (CST))
  - Summer (DST): UTC-5 (CDT)
- ZIP code: 39328
- Area code: 601
- FIPS code: 28-18340
- GNIS feature ID: 0669159

De Kalb is a town in and the county seat of Kemper County, Mississippi, United States. As of the 2020 census, De Kalb had a population of 877. De Kalb is named after General Johann de Kalb, a Franconian-French military officer who served as a major general in the Continental Army during the American Revolutionary War.

== Geography ==
De Kalb is located in central Kemper County at 32°46′11″N 88°39′1″W (32.769751, -88.650407). Mississippi Highway 16 passes through the north side of the town, leading east 11 miles (18 km) to Scooba and west 28 miles (45 km) to Philadelphia. Mississippi Highway 39 (Main Avenue) passes through the center of De Kalb, leading north 19 miles (31 km) to Shuqualak and south 30 miles (48 km) to Meridian.

According to the United States Census Bureau, De Kalb has a total area of 3.3 square miles (8.6 km^{2}), of which 0.01 square miles (0.02 km^{2}), or 0.22%, are water.

== Demographics ==
Historical population
| Census | Pop. | Note | %± |
|---|---|---|---|
| 1920 | 554 | | — |
| 1930 | 888 | | 60.3% |
| 1940 | 866 | | −2.5% |
| 1950 | 953 | | 10.0% |
| 1960 | 880 | | −7.7% |
| 1970 | 1,072 | | 21.8% |
| 1980 | 1,159 | | 8.1% |
| 1990 | 1,073 | | −7.4% |
| 2000 | 972 | | −9.4% |
| 2010 | 1,164 | | 19.8% |
| 2020 | 877 | | −24.7% |
U.S. Decennial Census

=== Racial and ethnic composition ===
De Kalb town, Mississippi – Racial and ethnic composition Note: the US Census treats Hispanic/Latino as an ethnic category. This table excludes Latinos from the racial categories and assigns them to a separate category. Hispanics/Latinos may be of any race.
| Race / Ethnicity (NH = Non-Hispanic) | Pop 2000 | Pop 2010 | Pop 2020 | % 2000 | % 2010 | % 2020 |
|---|---|---|---|---|---|---|
| White alone (NH) | 471 | 372 | 225 | 48.46% | 31.96% | 25.66% |
| Black or African American alone (NH) | 481 | 773 | 631 | 49.49% | 66.41% | 71.95% |
| Native American or Alaska Native alone (NH) | 2 | 0 | 1 | 0.21% | 0.00% | 0.11% |
| Asian alone (NH) | 0 | 0 | 0 | 0.00% | 0.00% | 0.00% |
| Native Hawaiian or Pacific Islander alone (NH) | 0 | 0 | 1 | 0.00% | 0.00% | 0.11% |
| Other race alone (NH) | 0 | 0 | 3 | 0.00% | 0.00% | 0.34% |
| Mixed race or Multiracial (NH) | 9 | 8 | 10 | 0.93% | 0.69% | 1.14% |
| Hispanic or Latino (any race) | 9 | 11 | 6 | 0.93% | 0.95% | 0.68% |
| Total | 972 | 1,164 | 877 | 100.00% | 100.00% | 100.00% |

=== 2020 census ===
As of the 2020 United States census, there were 877 people, 480 households, and 292 families residing in the town.

=== 2000 census ===
As of the census of 2000, there were 972 people, 388 households, and 233 families residing in the town. The population density was 293.5 inhabitants per square mile (113.3/km^{2}). There were 444 housing units at an average density of 134.1 per square mile (51.8/km^{2}). The racial makeup of the town was 70.31% African American, 18.56% White, 0.21% Native American, and 0.93% from two or more races. Hispanic or Latino of any race were 0.93% of the population.

There were 388 households, out of which 26.5% had children under the age of 18 living with them, 35.8% were married couples living together, 20.9% had a female householder with no husband present, and 39.7% were non-families. 37.6% of all households were made up of individuals, and 20.9% had someone living alone who was 65 years of age or older. The average household size was 2.28 and the average family size was 3.03.

In the town, the population was spread out, with 22.6% under the age of 18, 9.0% from 18 to 24, 23.0% from 25 to 44, 19.5% from 45 to 64, and 25.8% who were 65 years of age or older. The median age was 42 years. For every 100 females, there were 83.7 males. For every 100 females age 18 and over, there were 73.3 males.

The median income for a household in the town was $21,000, and the median income for a family was $24,886. Males had a median income of $26,477 versus $16,964 for females. The per capita income for the town was $11,171. About 23.3% of families and 28.1% of the population were below the poverty line, including 38.9% of those under age 18 and 21.0% of those age 65 or over.

== Education ==
De Kalb is served by the Kemper County School District.

East Mississippi Community College is the community college of Kemper County.

== Notable people ==
- Eddie Briggs, former Lieutenant Governor of Mississippi
- Bud Brown, former safety for the Miami Dolphins
- Cleo Brown, blues and jazz vocalist and pianist
- John A. Clark, member of the Mississippi State Senate from 1916 to 1920
- Lyscum Elbert Crowson, Methodist minister
- J. H. Rush, physician
- John H. Stennis, member of the Mississippi House of Representatives from 1969 to 1984
- Louis Westerfield, lawyer and former dean of the University of Mississippi School of Law
- Jeremiah White, cast member on Love Island
