= National Register of Historic Places listings in Winston County, Mississippi =

Location of Winston County in Mississippi

This is a list of the National Register of Historic Places listings in Winston County, Mississippi.

This is intended to be a complete list of the properties and districts on the National Register of Historic Places in Winston County, Mississippi, United States. Latitude and longitude coordinates are provided for many National Register properties and districts; these locations may be seen together in a map.

There are 8 properties and districts listed on the National Register in the county.

This National Park Service list is complete through NPS recent listings posted March 14, 2025.

== Current listings ==
	Name on the Register	Image	Date listed	Location	City or town	Description
1	Baptist Church of Christ at Sardis	Baptist Church of Christ at Sardis	March 21, 2011 (#11000110)	2185 Sardis Rd. 33°03′20″N 88°51′13″W	Louisville vicinity	
2	Downtown Louisville Historic District	Downtown Louisville Historic District	July 20, 2011 (#11000473)	Bounded by Church St., W. Park St., Columbus Ave. & Mill St. 33°07′25″N 89°03′16″W	Louisville	
3	Foster-Fair House	Foster-Fair House	November 29, 2000 (#00000332)	507 S. Columbus Ave. 33°07′04″N 89°03′09″W	Louisville	
4	Legion State Park	Legion State Park	November 5, 1998 (#98001333)	635 Legion State Park Rd. 33°09′05″N 89°02′41″W	Louisville vicinity	
5	Old Masonic Hall	Old Masonic Hall	February 25, 1994 (#94000065)	302 W. Park St. 33°07′19″N 89°03′22″W	Louisville	
6	Nanih Waiya Mound And Village	Nanih Waiya Mound And Village	March 28, 1973 (#73001032)	Along Mississippi Highway 393 in Nanih Waiya State Park; 32°55′15″N 88°56′55″W	Fearns Springs	
7	Old Robinson Road	Old Robinson Road	April 3, 1975 (#75001061)	16.6 miles northeast of Louisville in the Noxubee National Wildlife Refuge; 33°16′32″N 88°49′52″W	Louisville vicinity	
8	Benjamin Franklin Smyth House	Benjamin Franklin Smyth House	February 25, 1994 (#94000064)	227 Smyth Rd. 33°05′52″N 89°04′24″W	Louisville	

== See also ==
- List of National Historic Landmarks in Mississippi
- National Register of Historic Places listings in Mississippi
