= Mississippi Highway 397 =

State highway in Mississippi

Mississippi Highway 397

Route information
- Maintained by MDOT
- Length: 33.564 mi (54.016 km)
- Existed: 1957–present

Major junctions
- South end: MS 16 near De Kalb
- MS 21 in Preston MS 490 in Nanih Waiya
- North end: MS 14 in Louisville

Location
- Country: United States
- State: Mississippi
- Counties: Kemper, Winston

Highway system
- Mississippi State Highway System; Interstate; US; State
← MS 395	→ MS 403

Mississippi Highway 397 (MS 397) is a 33 1/2-mile-long (53.9 km) state highway in eastern Mississippi. Running generally in a southeast to northwest direction, it is signed north—south traveling from the De Kalb vicinity at MS 16 to Louisville at MS 14.

== Route description ==
The state highway begins west of De Kalb along MS 16. MS 397 heads northwest through barren forest land as a two-lane 55 miles per hour (89 km/h) speed limit highway. First, an access road to Kemper Lake intersects the highway, later Sinai Road branches off the highway providing access to a small settlement. Continuing northwest, MS 397 intersects the northern end of unsigned MS 493 and a second access road to Kemper Lake. About 0.9 miles (1.4 km) later, it reaches the northern terminus of MS 495. Then about 1 1/4 miles (2.0 km) after that, MS 397 reaches the settlement of Preston which has an intersection with MS 21, some houses, and a pair of stores.

To the north of Preston, MS 397 heads through more woodlands, though as it approaches the Winston County line, some open fields appear along the road. After entering Winston County, MS 397 heads northwest through a mix of woods and fields. The highway passes Nanih Waiya High School, A Dollar General store, and a small traveler stop. MS 397 reaches an intersection with MS 490 and the two highways run concurrent for about 0.8 miles (1.3 km) to the west. At the settlement of Vernon, MS 490 breaks off to head southwest while MS 397 continues northwest. It passes more woodlands and field mix as well as a hunting lodge and lake. As it enters the city of Louisville, the road name officially becomes E John C. Stennis Drive. It passes a few clusters of houses, a cemetery, and small businesses. MS 397 curves to the due west, crosses S Columbus Avenue, and becomes W John C. Stennis Drive for the next block. At the next intersection, S Church Avenue, MS 397 turns north onto it through Louisville's central business district. The highway ends at MS 14 which carries Main Street in the city.

== History ==
A state highway connecting De Kalb and Louisville had existed since 1940. By 1950, with the portion of the road in Winton County being fully paved, was given the designation of MS 397. The remaining portion of MS 397 was paved by 1955.

== Major intersections ==
County	Location	mi	km	Destinations	Notes
Kemper		0.000	0.000	MS 16 – De Kalb, Philadelphia	Southern terminus; to John C. Stennis Memorial Hospital
Kemper	Lynville	8.792	14.149	MS 493 south – Joe W. Williams Field	Northern terminus of MS 493
Kemper		9.702	15.614	MS 495 south / Nell Burnett Road	Northern terminus of MS 495
Kemper	Preston	10.937	17.601	MS 21 – Philadelphia, Shuqualak	
Winston	Mashulaville	20.031	32.237	MS 490 east – Mashulaville	Southern end of MS 490 concurrency
Winston	Vernon	20.848	33.552	MS 490 west – Noxapater, Nanih Waiya State Park	Northern end of MS 490 concurrency
Winston	Louisville	33.564	54.016	MS 14 / North Church Avenue – Kosciusko, Macon	Northern terminus
1.000 mi = 1.609 km; 1.000 km = 0.621 mi: Concurrency terminus
