= Mississippi Highway 490 =

Mississippi Highway 490

Route information
- Auxiliary route of MS 397
- Maintained by MDOT
- Length: 13.130 mi (21.131 km)
- Existed: 1954–present
- History: Early 1950s: Planned Mid 1950s: West Segment being built Late 1950s: East Segment being built Mid 1960s: West Segment finished Early 1970s: East Segment finished
- Time period: Late 1950s

Western segment
- Length: 6.890 mi (11.088 km)
- West end: MS 15 in Noxapater
- Major intersections: MS 15 south – Noxapater; MS 15 north – Noxapater; MS 395 in Noxapater
- East end: MS 397 in Nanih Waiya

Eastern segment
- Length: 6.700 mi (10.783 km)
- West end: MS 397 in Nanih Waiya
- Major intersections: MS 14 east – Mashulaville; MS 14 west – Mashulaville
- East end: MS 14 in Mashulaville

Location
- Country: United States
- State: Mississippi
- Counties: Winston, Noxubee

Highway system
- Mississippi State Highway System; Interstate; US; State
← MS 489	→ MS 491

Mississippi Highway 490 (MS 490) is a county highway in eastern Mississippi. The highway's western terminus is at the intersection of MS 395 and MS 15 in Noxapater. From there, it travels generally eastward, serving as a spur for MS 397 by accessing roads off of MS 397

The western segment ends at an T-Intersection in Nanih Waiya

its eastern segment starts by splitting up with MS 397.

After splitting up MS 490 ends at an T-Intersection in Mashulaville, Highway 14 runs past the intersection.

== Western Segment of Mississippi Highway 490 ==
MS 490 begins in rural Winston County at a junction with MS 395,MS 15 in Noxapater in the vicinity of the historic Nanih Waiya Mound and the associated Nanih Waiya Historical Memorial. From this point, the highway proceeds generally eastward through a largely rural landscape, characterized by agricultural areas and woodlands.

As it continues its eastward trajectory, MS 490 approaches MS 393. This road leads to the Nanih Waiya Mound.

South East of Louisville, MS 490 continues its rural course until it reach its eastern terminus in the community of Nanih Waiya and Mashulaville. Here, it concurs with MS 397 a significant north–south county highway.

The total length of MS 490 is approximately 5.206 miles (8.378 km). The route is maintained by the Mississippi Department of Transportation (MDOT). The entire length of MS 490 is a two-lane, rural state highway.

== Eastern Segment of Mississippi Highway 490 ==
Mississippi Highway 490 Eastern (MS 490 E) is a relatively short, rural state highway in eastern Mississippi, spanning approximately 5.2 miles (8.4 km). Its "eastern segment" specifically refers to the portion of the highway that extends from the vicinity of Macon in Noxubee County eastward to its terminus in the community of Noxapater.

"This eastern segment of MS 490 is characterized by a two-lane road that primarily traverses agricultural land and woodlands. Significantly, MS 490 has a concurrency with Mississippi Highway 397 (MS 397) in the Nanih Waiya area, meaning the two highways share the same road for a portion of their route. A notable point along this segment is its intersection with Mississippi Highway 14 (MS 14) in Mashulaville, Noxubee County, which provides a key connection for local traffic. While it doesn't pass directly through downtown Macon, it serves as an access route to the town from the east. Ultimately, MS 490's eastern segment fulfills its role as a local connector, facilitating movement between the Nanih Waiya historical area, and Macon."

== History ==
When MS 397 was being paved they figured they would not be able to make the road connect to Highway 14 from far from where they started paving, so they made MS 490 for cars to get to Highway 14 to Highway 397.

== Major intersections ==
County	Location	mi	km	Destinations	Notes
Winston	Nanih Waiya	0.000	0.000	MS 397 north – Nanih Waiya	
Winston	Vernon	4.031	6.487	MS 397 south – Vernon	
Winston	Vernon	6.848	11.021	MS 397 north – Noxapater	
Winston	Noxapater	3.564	5.736	MS 15 south – Noxapater, Plattsburg	
1.000 mi = 1.609 km; 1.000 km = 0.621 mi: Concurrency terminus
