= Mississippi Highway 395 =

State highway in the United States

Mississippi Highway 395
- MS 395 highlighted in red

Route information
- Maintained by MDOT
- Length: 14.645 mi (23.569 km)
- Existed: 1958–present

Major junctions
- South end: MS 19 in Arlington
- North end: MS 15 / MS 490 in Noxapater

Location
- Country: United States
- State: Mississippi
- Counties: Neshoba, Winston

Highway system
- Mississippi State Highway System; Interstate; US; State
← MS 393	→ MS 397

Mississippi Highway 395 (MS 395) is a short state highway in east-central Mississippi. It connects the small communities of Arlington and Plattsburg, along with MS 19, with the town of Noxapater.

== Route description ==
MS 395 begins in northern Neshoba County at an intersection with MS 19 in Arlington. The highway heads north through a mix of farmland and wooded areas for a few miles before crossing into Winston County. The highway immediately passes through the community of Plattsburg, where it has an intersection with Plattsburg Road, which leads a short distance away to MS 25. It winds its way northward through woodlands for the next several miles, crossing a couple of small creeks and having an intersection with Liberty Road (also leads to MS 25), before curving eastward to pass through farmland an enter the town of Noxapater along W Main Street. MS 395 passes through neighborhoods before coming to an end at the center of downtown, at an intersection with MS 15 (Kilpatrick Street), with the road continuing east as MS 490 (E Main Street).

The entire length of Mississippi Highway 395 is a rural, two-lane, state highway.

== Major intersections ==
County	Location	mi	km	Destinations	Notes
Neshoba	Arlington	0.00	0.00	MS 19 – Philadelphia, Kosciusko	Southern terminus; road continues south as County Road 399 (CR 399)
Winston	Noxapater	14.65	23.58	MS 15 (Kilpatrick Street) – Philadelphia, Louisville MS 490 east (E Main Street) – De Kalb	Northern terminus; western terminus of MS 490
1.000 mi = 1.609 km; 1.000 km = 0.621 mi
