= Chris Blair (American football) =

American football player (born 1997)

No. 19 – Atlanta Falcons
- Position: Wide receiver
- Roster status: Active

Personal information
- Born: October 6, 1997 (age 29); Louisville, Mississippi, U.S.
- Listed height: 6 ft 2 in (1.88 m)
- Listed weight: 215 lb (98 kg)

Career information
- High school: Louisville
- College: Hinds CC (2016–2017); Alcorn State (2018–2019)
- NFL draft: 2020: undrafted

Career history
- Green Bay Packers (2021–2022)*; DC Defenders (2023); Atlanta Falcons (2023–present)
- * Offseason or practice squad member only

Career NFL statistics as of Week 5, 2026
- Receptions: 2
- Receiving yards: 23
- Stats at Pro Football Reference

Christopher Marquinton "CB" Blair (born October 6, 1997) is an American professional football wide receiver for the Atlanta Falcons of the National Football League (NFL). He played college football at Hinds Community College and for the Alcorn State Braves. He also played for the Green Bay Packers of the National Football League (NFL) and for the DC Defenders of the XFL.

== Early life ==
Blair grew up in Louisville, Mississippi and attended Louisville High School where he lettered in football and basketball. He was an unranked wide receiver recruit and committed to Hinds Community College.

== College career ==
=== Hinds CC ===
During Blair's true freshman season in 2016, he played in six games where he recorded seven receptions for 46 yards.

During the 2017 season, Blair played in nine games while starting four of them. He finished the season by catching nine passes for 172 receiving yards and three touchdowns.

=== Alcorn State ===
During the 2018 season, Blair played in 13 games while starting 11 of them. He finished the season by catching 43 passes for 529 receiving yards and six touchdowns. He led the team in receiving yards in 2018.

During the 2019 season, Blair played in 13 games while starting 12 of them. He finished the season by catching 44 passes for 931 receiving yards and seven touchdowns. Blair ranked 6th in the nation in yards per reception with 21.2. He also lead the team in receiving yards in 2019.

== Professional career ==
Pre-draft measurables
Height	Weight	Arm length	Hand span	Wingspan
6 ft 1 7/8 in (1.88 m)	198 lb (90 kg)	31 7/8 in (0.81 m)	8 1/2 in (0.22 m)	6 ft 5 1/8 in (1.96 m)
All values from Pro Day

=== Green Bay Packers ===
After going undrafted in the 2020 NFL draft, the Green Bay Packers brought in Blair for a tryout on August 30, 2020. The Packers hosted Blair for another tryout on January 6, 2021, and was signed to the team on January 8. Blair was released on August 25, but was re-signed to the practice squad on September 1. Blair was released from the practice squad on January 10, 2022, but later signed to a future contract on January 25. Blair was released on May 11.

=== DC Defenders ===
After a tryout with the Indianapolis Colts on August 1, 2022, Blair signed with the DC Defenders of the XFL on January 26, 2023. Blair finished the 2023 XFL season with 25 receptions, 594 receiving yards, and three touchdowns.

Blair tried out for the Tennessee Titans after the 2023 season on May 27, 2023.

=== Atlanta Falcons ===
On June 18, 2023, Blair was signed by the Atlanta Falcons. Blair was reverted to an injured reserve on August 4. He was waived on August 14, with an injury settlement. Blair was re-signed to the team's practice squad on September 27. He made his NFL debut on November 26, versus the New Orleans Saints. Following the end of the regular season, Blair signed a reserve/future contract with the Falcons on January 10, 2024.

Blair was released by the Falcons as part of final roster cuts on August 27, 2024, and re-signed to their practice squad the next day. He was promoted to the active roster on December 21. The next day against the New York Giants, Blair recorded his first career catch on a 17-yard reception from Michael Penix Jr.

On August 26, 2025, Blair was waived by the Falcons as part of final roster cuts and re-signed to their practice squad the next day. He signed a reserve/future contract with Atlanta on January 5, 2026.

== XFL career statistics ==
Year	Team	Games		Receiving					
Year	Team	GP	GS	Tgt	Rec	Yds	Avg	Lng	TD
2023	DC	10	9	47	26	594	22.8	86	3
Career		10	9	47	26	594	22.8	86	3
