= Singleton, Winston County, Mississippi =

Singleton, Mississippi
- Ghost town
- Location within the state of Mississippi
- Coordinates: 33°11′20″N 88°51′25″W
- Country: United States
- State: Mississippi
- County: Winston
- Elevation: 292 ft (89 m)
- Time zone: UTC-6 (Central (CST))
  - Summer (DST): UTC-5 (CDT)
- GNIS feature ID: 687705

Singleton is a ghost town in Winston County, Mississippi, United States.

Singleton was located approximately 13 mi (21 km) northeast of Louisville.

The settlement had a post office and two churches. The population of was 75 in 1900.
