= Camile Street School =

Historically black school in Louisville, Mississippi

Coordinates: 33.1184°N 89.0633°W

- Louisville, Mississippi; United States

Camile Street School, also known as Louisville Colored School, was a school for African-American children in Louisville, Mississippi. It was originally opened as Winston County Training School, and later renamed Louisville Negro High School. It closed in 1970 due to the integration of public schools. At that time, it had a population of 1,961 students, all of whom were Black, in a district which was 50% White. In 1970 the Supreme Court decision Alexander v Holmes forced the integration of Black and White schools. High School students were sent to Louisville High School. For racist White people to maintain segregated schools, a private segregation academy, Winston Academy was established.

The school's sports teams were nicknamed the Trojans.

In 1970, the Louisville Municipal School District proposed that all White students attend Louisville High School, while Camile Street School was to host only students in grades 1 through 7 and grade 9, and remain 100% Black. This proposal fell by the wayside when the Supreme Court established Alexander v Holmes. The school was later repurposed as Louisville Junior High School and finally Louisville Middle School.
