= Alabama State Route 32 =

State highway in Alabama, United States

State Route 32

Route information
- Maintained by ALDOT
- Length: 3.594 mi (5.784 km)
- Existed: 1957–present

Major junctions
- West end: MS 14 at the Mississippi state line near Cochrane
- East end: SR 17 near Cochrane

Location
- Country: United States
- State: Alabama

Highway system
- Alabama State Highway System; Interstate; US; State
← US 31	→ SR 33

State Route 32 (SR 32) is a 3.594 miles (5.784 km) state highway in southwestern Pickens County, in the U.S. state of Alabama. The highway enters the state as a continuation of Mississippi Highway 14 (MS 14), and continues east to an intersection with SR 17 at Cochrane, a small, unincorporated community southwest of Aliceville. MS 14, SR 32, and SR 17 serve as the connecting routes between Macon, Mississippi and Aliceville.

== History ==
The current version of SR 32 was formed in 1957, serving as a replacement of County Road 30. A previous alignment of SR 32 existed between 1940 and 1957, connecting Oneonta and Albertville. The former SR 32 is now designated as SR 75.

== Route description ==
SR 32 begins at the Mississippi state line, in Pickens County, heading east on a two-lane undivided road. The highway continues west into Mississippi as MS 14. The highway travels through open farmland, intersecting CR 1. SR 32 reaches its eastern terminus at an intersection with SR 17 in Cochrane.

== Major intersections ==
The entire route is in Pickens County.

Location	mi	km	Destinations	Notes
	0.000	0.000	MS 14 west – Macon	Mississippi state line
Cochrane	3.594	5.784	SR 17 – Aliceville, Geiger	Eastern terminus
1.000 mi = 1.609 km; 1.000 km = 0.621 mi
