= Mississippi Highway 14 =

State Highway in Mississippi

Mississippi Highway 14

Route information
- Maintained by MDOT
- Length: 145.4 mi (234.0 km) (139.332 mi excluding concurrencies)
- Existed: 1934–present

Western segment
- Length: 31.3 mi (50.4 km)
- West end: Levee Road in Mayersville
- Major intersections: MS 1 in Mayersville; US 61 from Rolling Fork to Anguilla
- East end: MS 149 in Louise

Eastern segment
- Length: 114.1 mi (183.6 km)
- West end: Ebenezer Coxburg Road / Ebenezer Road
- Major intersections: I-55 in Goodman; US 51 in Goodman; US 45 in Macon; MS 145 in Macon; MS 490 in Mashulaville
- East end: SR 32 at the Alabama state line near McLeod

Location
- Country: United States
- State: Mississippi
- Counties: Issaquena, Sharkey, Humphreys, Holmes, Attala, Winston, Noxubee

Highway system
- Mississippi State Highway System; Interstate; US; State
← MS 13	→ MS 15

Mississippi Highway 14 (MS 14) is a 145.4-mile-long (234.0 km) state highway that runs from west to east in the U.S. State of Mississippi. MS 14 serves the counties of Issaquena, Sharkey, Humphreys, Holmes, Attala, Winston, and Noxubee. MS 14 exists in two sections. The first section runs from west to east, beginning at Levee Road in Mayersville and ending at a junction with MS 149 near Louise. The second section begins at Ebenezer Coxburg Road / Ebenezer Road in Ebenezer and runs eastward to the Mississippi/Alabama state line near Macon where it continues as Alabama State Route 32 (SR 32).

== Route description ==
=== Western segment ===
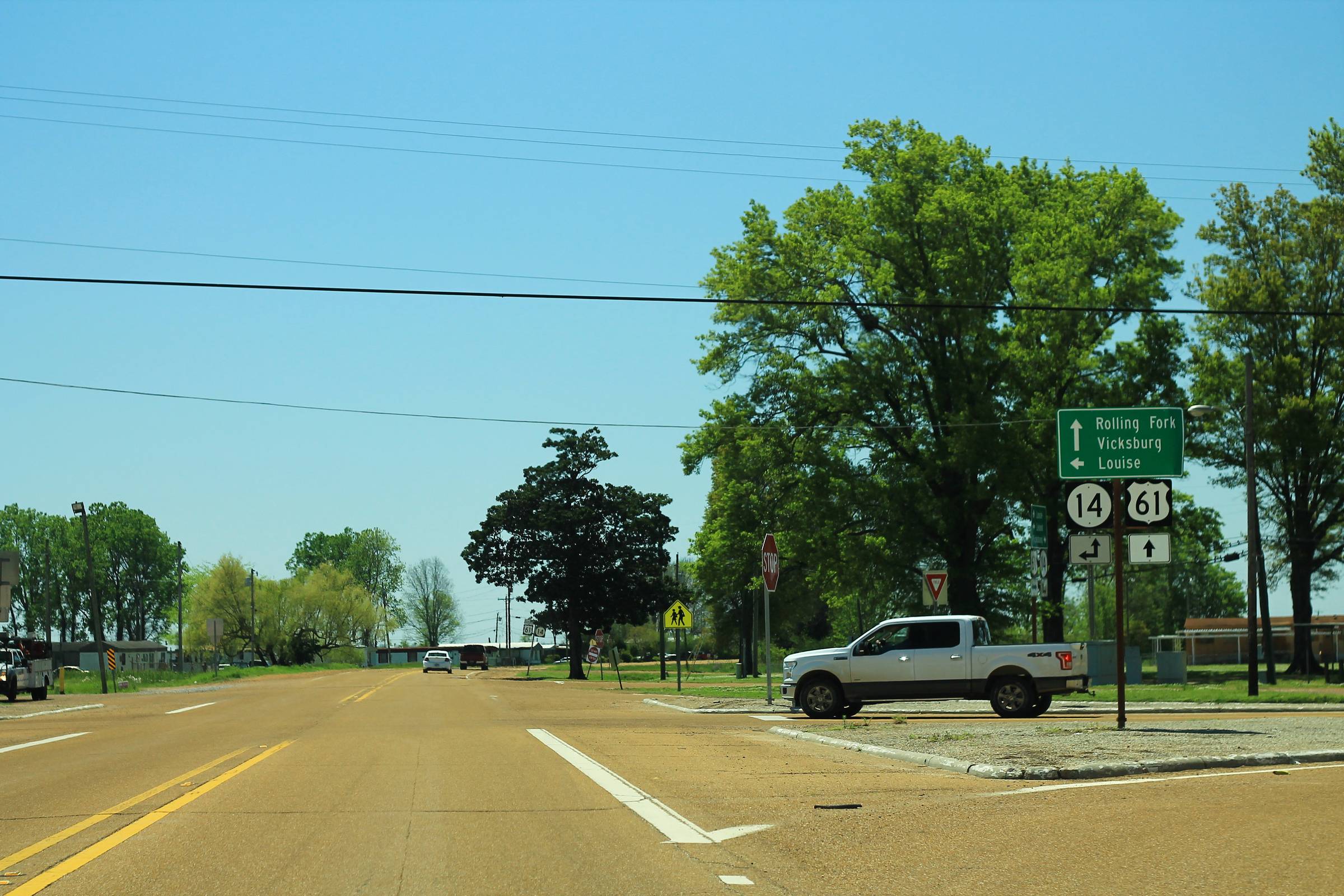
The intersection of US 61 and MS 14 in Anguilla

MS 14 begins in Issaquena County in Mayersville at a fork in the road at an intersection with Levee Road, not even a half mile from the banks of the Mississippi River (one can access the river via this gravel road). The highway heads east straight through the center of town along Court Street, where it has an intersection and becomes concurrent with MS 1 (part of the Great River Road). They head northeast as a two-lane highway to leave Mayersville and pass through rural farmland for several miles to an intersection where MS 1 (Great River Road) splits off and heads north toward Greenville. MS 14 heads due east through more flat farmland to cross Newsom Bayou before entering Sharkey County at a bridge over a small creek.

MS 14 passes along the northern edge of Indian Bayou State Wildlife Management Area before entering the Rolling Fork city limits as Race Street. It has a junction with MS 826 and passes by the town's hospital before passing through neighborhoods, where it crosses Deer Creek, and along the southern edge of downtown to come to an intersection with US 61. The highway becomes concurrent with US 61 and they head north to have an intersection with MS 16 (McLaurin Street) before passing through a business district. US 61/MS 14 have an intersection with Rosenwald Avenue (former/connector to the other section of MS 16) before leaving Rolling Fork and passing through flat farmland for several miles. The highway now enters Anguilla, with MS 14 splitting off and heading east at the eastern edge of downtown. MS 14 crosses the Sunflower River before passing along the northern edge of the Delta National Forest and entering Humphreys County.

MS 14 passes through rural flat farmland for several miles before coming to an end at the very northern edge of Louise at an intersection with MS 149.

This entire western segment of MS 14 lies entirely within the Mississippi Delta region.

=== Eastern segment ===
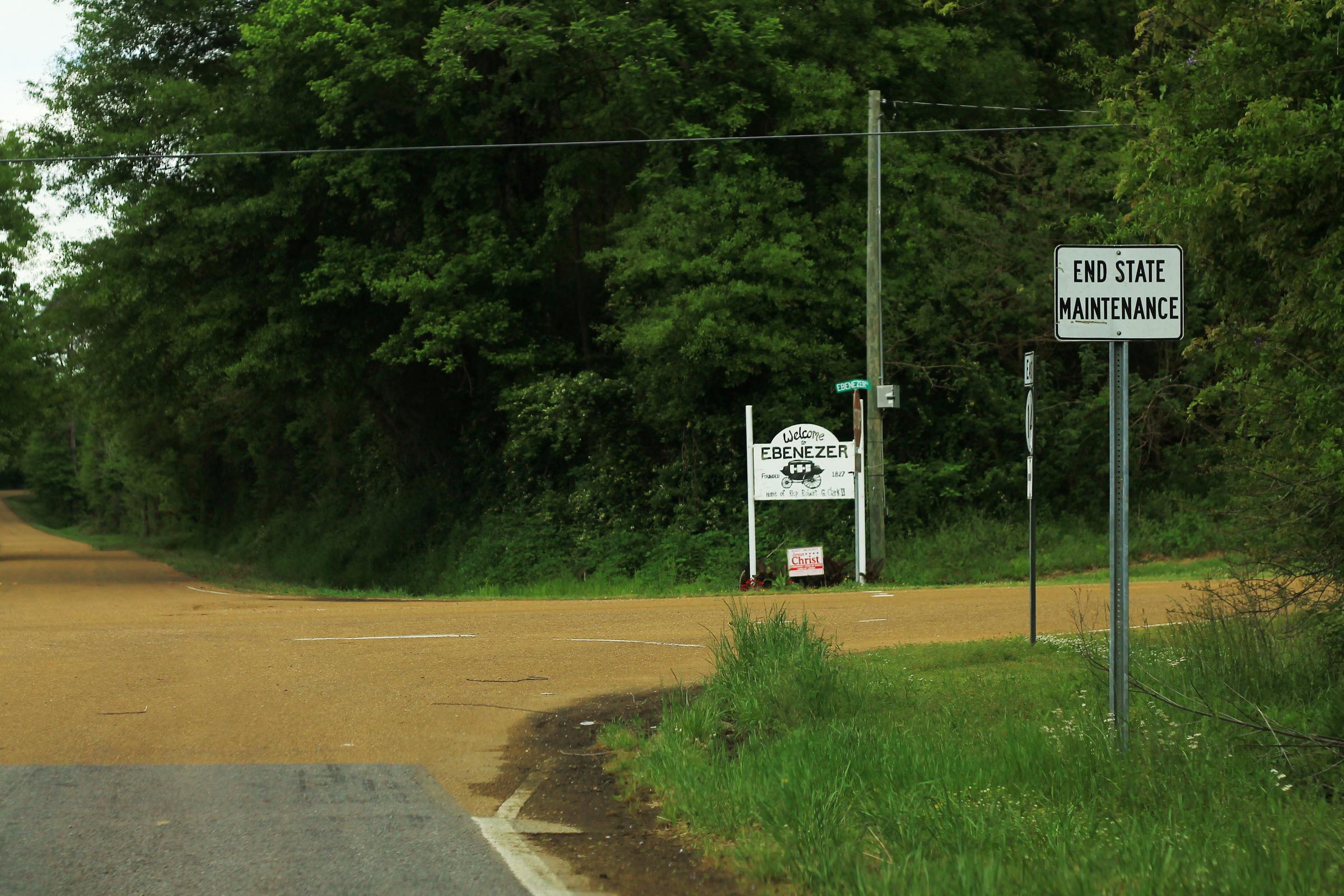
Terminus of eastern segment at a four-way stop in Ebenezer

MS 14 begins again in Holmes County at a four-way stop in the community of Ebenezer. It heads east as a two-lane highway through farmland and wooded areas for a few miles to pass through Richland, where it has a short concurrency with MS 17 and an interchange with I-55 (Exit 146). The highway now passes through the town of Goodman, where it passes by the Goodman campus of Holmes Community College and has an intersection with US 51, before crossing the Big Black River into Attala County.

MS 14 passes eastward through a mix of farmland and woodlands for the next several miles, where it has a concurrency with MS 429, before becoming concurrent with MS 43 and the two head north to enter the Kosciusko outskirts. MS 14 splits off at an intersection with S Natchez Street and the highway heads east to bypass the town along its south side as it passes over the Natchez Trace Parkway (without an interchange) and crosses the Yockanookany River. MS 14 now travels through neighboring Williamsville, where it becomes concurrent with MS 19 at an intersection with MS 35, as well as having an intersection with MS 736, before leaving the Kosciusko area. MS 19 splits off after a few miles and MS 14 continues east through remote woodlands for several miles, where it has an intersection with Hanna Road (proposed MS 411 extension) before entering Winston County.

MS 14 continues east through woodlands to have an intersection with MS 15/MS 25 before passing straight through downtown Louisville, where it has an intersection with MS 397 (S Church Avenue). The highway now leaves Louisville and passes through farmland for several miles before re-entering woodlands to cross into Noxubee County.

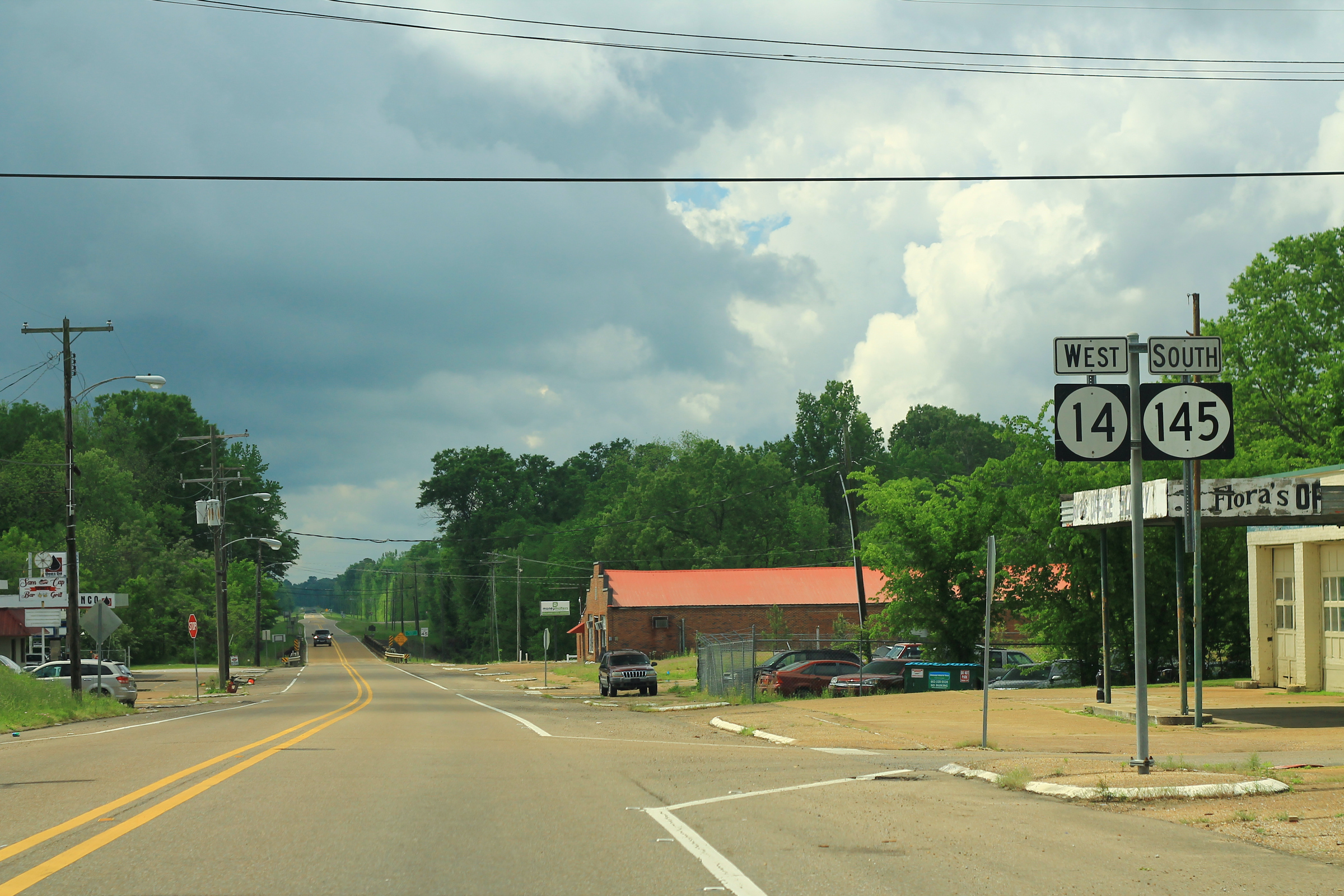
MS 14/MS 145 in Macon

MS 14 passes through Mashulaville, where it has an intersection with MS 490, before passing through some farmland and becoming concurrent with MS 145. They head north to cross the Noxubee River into Macon, with MS 14 splitting off in downtown. MS 14 has an intersection with US 45 before leaving Macon and passing rural farmland for several miles to come to the Alabama state line, where the road continues into that state as Alabama State Route 32 (SR 32).

== Major intersections ==
County	Location	mi	km	Destinations	Notes
Issaquena	Mayersville	0.0	0.0	Levee Road	Western terminus of western segment
Issaquena	Mayersville	0.4	0.64	MS 1 south / Great River Road south – Onward, Vicksburg	West end of MS 1 overlap
Issaquena		6.0	9.7	MS 1 north / Great River Road north – Glen Allan, Greenville	East end of MS 1 overlap
Sharkey		10.1	16.3	MS 826 east to US 61 south – Onward, Vicksburg	Western terminus of MS 826
Sharkey	Rolling Fork	11.5	18.5	US 61 south – Vicksburg	West end of US 61 overlap
Sharkey	Rolling Fork	11.6	18.7	MS 16 / Walnut Street – Downtown Rolling Fork, Delta National Forest	
Sharkey	Rolling Fork	12.3	19.8	To MS 16 west / Rosenwald Avenue	
Sharkey	Anguilla	17.1	27.5	US 61 north / MS 824 west – Leland	East end of US 61 overlap
Humphreys		31.3	50.4	MS 149 – Silver City, Yazoo City, Louise	Eastern terminus of western segment
Gap in route
Holmes	Ebenezer	0.0	0.0	Ebenezer Coxburg Road / Ebenezer Road	Western terminus of eastern segment; to MS 433
Holmes		6.2	10.0	MS 17 south – Pickens	West end of MS 17 overlap
Holmes	Richland	6.7	10.8	MS 17 north – Lexington	East end of MS 17 overlap
Holmes		7.9– 8.1	12.7– 13.0	I-55 – Grenada, Jackson	I-55 exit 146
Holmes	Goodman	11.1	17.9	US 51 – Durant, Pickens	
Attala	Newport	22.1	35.6	MS 429 north – Sallis	West end of MS 429 overlap
Attala	Zemuly	24.3	39.1	MS 429 south – Thomastown	East end of MS 429 overlap
Attala		32.6	52.5	MS 43 south – Thomastown, Canton	West end of MS 43 overlap
Attala		34.4	55.4	MS 43 north / South Natchez Street – Kosciusko	East end of MS 43 overlap
Attala	Williamsville	36.2	58.3	MS 19 north / MS 35 – Kosciusko, Carthage	West end of MS 19 overlap
Attala	Williamsville	38.1	61.3	MS 736 west – Williamsville	Eastern terminus of MS 736
Attala		42.8	68.9	MS 19 south – Zama, Philadelphia, Meridian	East end of MS 19 overlap
Attala		50.1	80.6	Hanna Road - Ethel, McCool	Proposed MS 411
Winston	Louisville	67.2	108.1	MS 15 / MS 25 – Carthage, Philadelphia, Ackerman, Starkville	
Winston	Louisville	68.9	110.9	MS 397 south	Northern terminus of MS 397
Noxubee	Mashulaville	87.8	141.3	MS 490 - Mashulaville	To MS 490
Noxubee		98.8	159.0	MS 145 south – Shuqualak	West end of MS 145 overlap
Noxubee	Macon	99.4	160.0	MS 145 north – Brooksville	East end of MS 145 overlap
Noxubee	Macon	100.3	161.4	US 45 – Columbus, Meridian	
Noxubee		114.1	183.6	SR 32 east – Aliceville	Eastern terminus of eastern segment
1.000 mi = 1.609 km; 1.000 km = 0.621 mi: Concurrency terminus
