= Perkinsville =

Perkinsville can refer to:

- Perkinsville, Alaska, USA
- Perkinsville, Arizona, USA
  - the Perkinsville Bridge is nearby
- Perkinsville, County Durham, England
- Perkinsville, Indiana, USA
- Perkinsville, New York, USA
- Perkinsville, Mississippi, USA
- Perkinsville, Vermont, USA
