= Larry Estes =

American football player (born 1946)

No. 84, 81, 75, 74
- Position: Defensive end

Personal information
- Born: December 9, 1946 (age 79); Louisville, Mississippi, U.S.
- Listed height: 6 ft 6 in (1.98 m)
- Listed weight: 255 lb (116 kg)

Career information
- High school: Louisville
- College: Alcorn A&M
- NFL draft: 1970: 8th round, 192nd overall pick

Career history
- New Orleans Saints (1970–1971); Philadelphia Eagles (1972–1972); Kansas City Chiefs (1975–1976)

Career NFL statistics
- Games played: 47
- Stats at Pro Football Reference

Lawrence G. Estes (born December 9, 1946) is an American former professional football player who was a defensive end in the National Football League (NFL). He played college football for the Alcorn A&M Braves (now Alcorn State).

Estes was born in Louisville, Mississippi, where he attended Louisville High School. One of few NAIA players to have been drafted by the NFL, Estes was the Saints 8th pick in the 1970 draft.
