= Andrew Fowler =

Andrew Fowler may refer to:

- Andrew Fowler (Baptist minister)
- Andrew Fowler (swimmer)
- Andrew Fowler (journalist)
