= Benjamin Franklin Smyth House =

Historic house in Mississippi, United States

- U.S. National Register of Historic Places
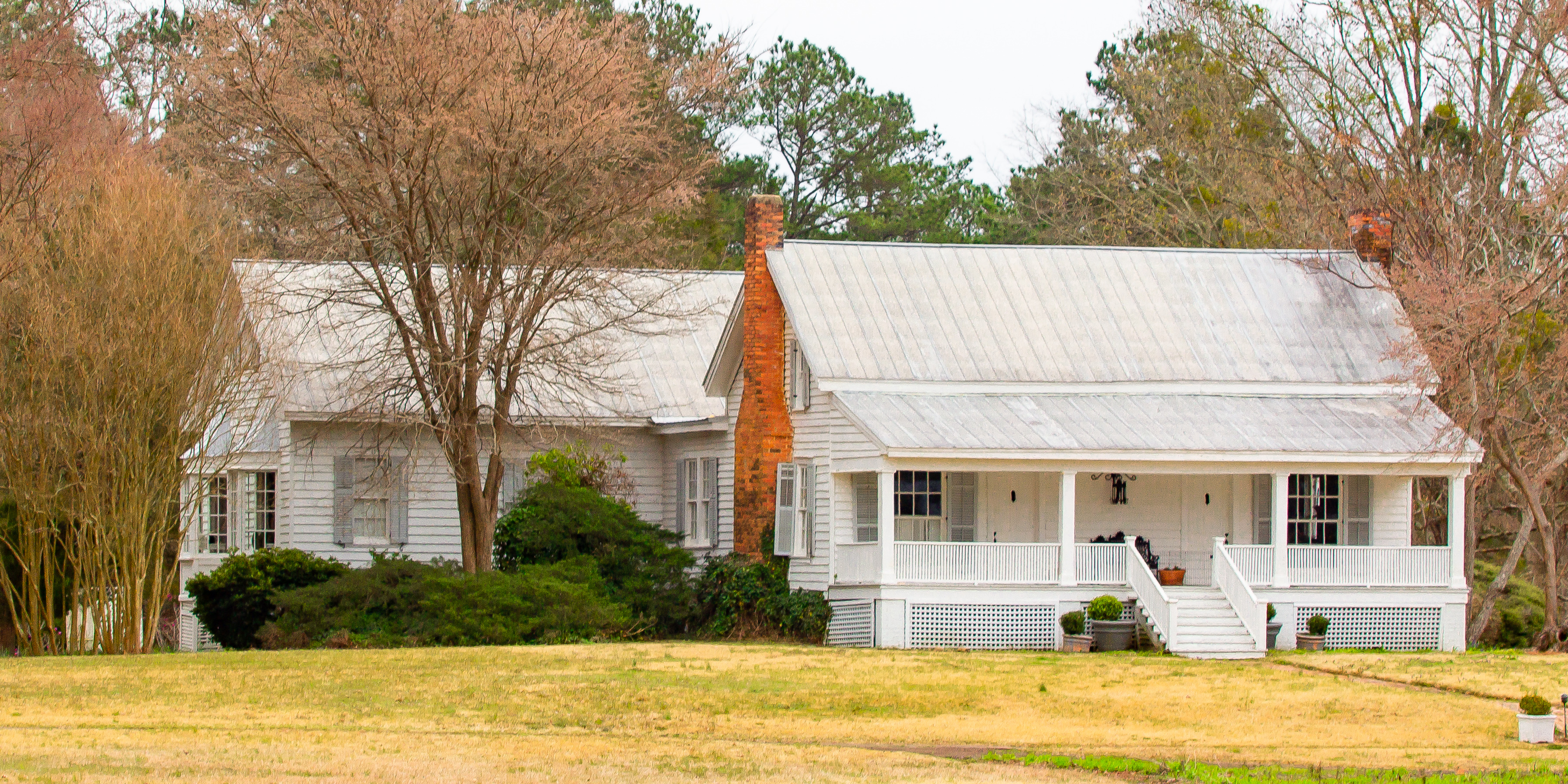

- Location within Mississippi
- Location: 207 Smyth Road, Louisville, Mississippi
- Coordinates: 33°05′52″N 89°04′24″W
- Area: 19 acres (7.7 ha)
- Built: 1840
- Architectural style: Single-pen log converted to hall & parlor
- NRHP reference No.: 94000064
- Added to NRHP: February 25, 1994

The Benjamin Franklin Smyth House is a historic house in Louisville, Mississippi. It was built in 1840 for John Brown Smyth, a settler who owned slaves, and his four sons. After his death, his son Benjamin Franklin Smyth inherited the house and expanded it with the help of another brother, Samuel Washington Smyth, who also built the Foster-Fair House. Benjamin Franklin Smyth lived in this house with his wife, née Margaret Tankersley, and at least one son, Sylvester. By the 1990s, the house still belonged to the Smyth family.

The house has been listed on the National Register of Historic Places since February 25, 1994.
