= Winston County, Mississippi =

County in Mississippi, United States

- County
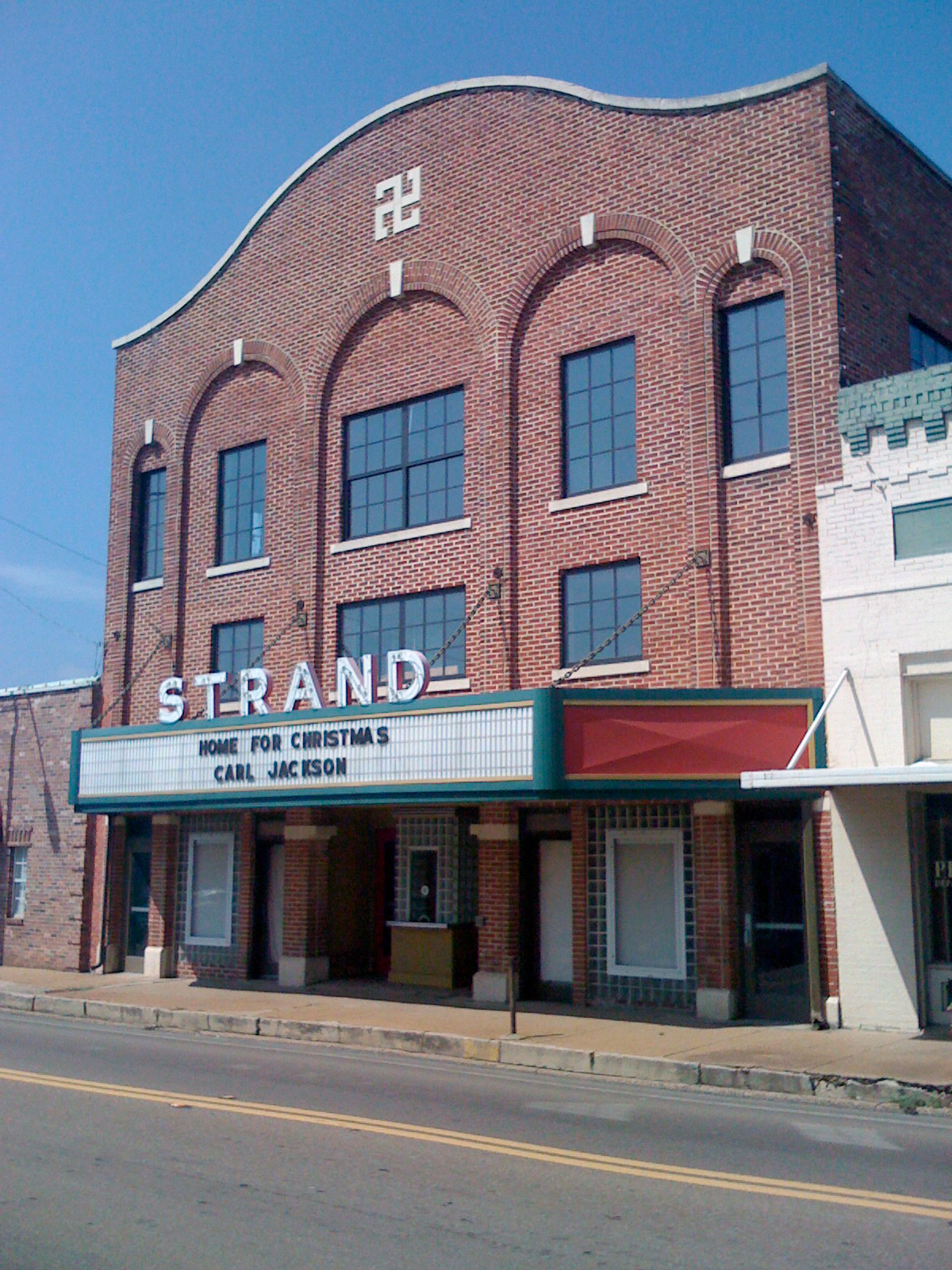
- The historic Strand Theatre in Louisville, Mississippi

- Location within the U.S. state of Mississippi
- Coordinates: 33°05′N 89°02′W
- Country: United States
- State: Mississippi
- Founded: 1833
- Named for: Louis Winston
- Seat: Louisville
- Largest city: Louisville

Area
  - Total: 610 sq mi (1,600 km^{2})
  - Land: 607 sq mi (1,570 km^{2})
  - Water: 2.8 sq mi (7.3 km^{2}) 0.5%

Population (2020)
  - Total: 17,714
  - Estimate (2025): 17,473 ▼
  - Density: 29.2/sq mi (11.3/km^{2})
- Time zone: UTC−6 (Central)
  - Summer (DST): UTC−5 (CDT)
- Congressional district: 3rd
- Website: Winston County, Mississippi; Winston County Economic Development District Partnership

Winston County is a county located in the U.S. state of Mississippi. In the 2020 census, the population was 17,714. Its county seat is Louisville. The county is named for Louis Winston (1784–1824), a colonel in the militia, a prominent lawyer, and a judge of the Mississippi Supreme Court.

The county is the site of Nanih Waiya, an ancient mound built in the Woodland period, about 1 CE-300 CE. Since the 17th century, it has been venerated by the Choctaw people who later occupied the area. As of 2008, the mound is owned by the Mississippi Band of Choctaw Indians, a federally-recognized tribe.

== History ==
The county is one of sixteen formed when Chief Greenwood LeFlore ceded the lands in the Treaty of Dancing Rabbit Creek, which resulted in the removal of the Choctaw Nation from their ancestral lands to Oklahoma.

In 1863, during the American Civil War, the Union Army under Colonel Benjamin H. Grierson, marched through Louisville with 900 troops on a raid through Mississippi. There was no fighting in Winston County and no significant destruction of property.

== Geography ==
According to the U.S. Census Bureau, the county has a total area of 610 square miles (1,600 km^{2}), of which 607 square miles (1,570 km^{2}) is land and 2.8 square miles (7.3 km^{2}) (0.5%) is water.

=== Major highways ===
- Mississippi Highway 14
- Mississippi Highway 15
- Mississippi Highway 19
- Mississippi Highway 25
- Mississippi Highway 397
- Mississippi Highway 490

=== Adjacent counties ===
- Oktibbeha County (north)
- Noxubee County (east)
- Kemper County (southeast)
- Neshoba County (south)
- Attala County (west)
- Choctaw County (northwest)

=== National protected area ===
- Tombigbee National Forest (part)

== Demographics ==
Historical population
Census	Pop.	Note	%±
1840	4,650		—
1850	7,956		71.1%
1860	9,811		23.3%
1870	8,984		−8.4%
1880	10,087		12.3%
1890	12,089		19.8%
1900	14,124		16.8%
1910	17,139		21.3%
1920	18,139		5.8%
1930	21,239		17.1%
1940	22,751		7.1%
1950	22,231		−2.3%
1960	19,246		−13.4%
1970	18,406		−4.4%
1980	19,474		5.8%
1990	19,433		−0.2%
2000	20,160		3.7%
2010	19,198		−4.8%
2020	17,714		−7.7%
2025 (est.)	17,473	▼	−1.4%
U.S. Decennial Census; 1790-1960 1900-1990; 1990-2000 2010-2013

Age pyramid Winston County

=== Racial and ethnic composition ===
Winston County, Mississippi – Racial and ethnic composition Note: the US Census treats Hispanic/Latino as an ethnic category. This table excludes Latinos from the racial categories and assigns them to a separate category. Hispanics/Latinos may be of any race.
Race / Ethnicity (NH = Non-Hispanic)	Pop 1980	Pop 1990	Pop 2000	Pop 2010	Pop 2020	% 1980	% 1990	% 2000	% 2010	% 2020
White alone (NH)	11,623	11,121	11,024	9,891	8,856	59.68%	57.23%	54.68%	51.52%	49.99%
Black or African American alone (NH)	7,560	8,064	8,687	8,729	8,078	38.82%	41.50%	43.09%	45.47%	45.60%
Native American or Alaska Native alone (NH)	155	162	128	215	162	0.80%	0.83%	0.63%	1.12%	0.91%
Asian alone (NH)	18	16	16	37	39	0.09%	0.08%	0.08%	0.19%	0.22%
Native Hawaiian or Pacific Islander alone (NH)	x	x	0	3	1	x	x	0.00%	0.02%	0.01%
Other race alone (NH)	1	0	2	4	19	0.01%	0.00%	0.01%	0.02%	0.11%
Mixed race or Multiracial (NH)	x	x	60	135	333	x	x	0.30%	0.70%	1.88%
Hispanic or Latino (any race)	117	70	243	184	226	0.60%	0.36%	1.21%	0.96%	1.28%
Total	19,474	19,433	20,160	19,198	17,714	100.00%	100.00%	100.00%	100.00%	100.00%

=== 2020 census ===
As of the 2020 census, the county had a population of 17,714. The median age was 42.3 years. 22.9% of residents were under the age of 18 and 21.3% of residents were 65 years of age or older. For every 100 females there were 94.0 males, and for every 100 females age 18 and over there were 90.7 males age 18 and over.

The racial makeup of the county was 50.2% White, 45.8% Black or African American, 1.0% American Indian and Alaska Native, 0.2% Asian, <0.1% Native Hawaiian and Pacific Islander, 0.6% from some other race, and 2.1% from two or more races. Hispanic or Latino residents of any race comprised 1.3% of the population.

<0.1% of residents lived in urban areas, while 100.0% lived in rural areas.

There were 7,207 households in the county, of which 30.4% had children under the age of 18 living in them. Of all households, 40.6% were married-couple households, 19.2% were households with a male householder and no spouse or partner present, and 35.3% were households with a female householder and no spouse or partner present. About 31.0% of all households were made up of individuals and 15.6% had someone living alone who was 65 years of age or older.

There were 8,174 housing units, of which 11.8% were vacant. Among occupied housing units, 73.2% were owner-occupied and 26.8% were renter-occupied. The homeowner vacancy rate was 1.8% and the rental vacancy rate was 7.2%.

=== 2010 census ===
As of the 2010 United States census, there were 19,198 people living in the county. 51.9% were White, 45.6% Black or African American, 1.1% Native American, 0.2% Asian, 0.2% of some other race and 0.9% of two or more races. 1.0% were Hispanic or Latino (of any race).

=== 2000 census ===
At the 2000 census, there were 20,160 people, 7,578 households and 5,471 families living in the county. The population density was 33 per square mile (13/km^{2}). There were 8,472 housing units at an average density of 14 per square mile (5.4/km^{2}). The racial makeup of the county was 55.26% White, 43.25% Black or African American, 0.66% Native American, 0.08% Asian, 0.28% from other races, and 0.46% from two or more races. 1.21% of the population were Hispanic or Latino of any race.

There were 7,578 households, of which 33.50% had children under the age of 18 living with them, 49.90% were married couples living together, 18.10% had a female householder with no husband present, and 27.80% were non-families. 25.20% of all households were made up of individuals, and 12.50% had someone living alone who was 65 years of age or older. The average household size was 2.59 and the average family size was 3.09.

26.80% of the population were under the age of 18, 9.20% from 18 to 24, 26.10% from 25 to 44, 22.50% from 45 to 64, and 15.50% who were 65 years of age or older. The median age was 36 years. For every 100 females there were 93.70 males. For every 100 females age 18 and over, there were 88.30 males.

The median household income was $28,256, and the median family income was $33,602. Males had a median income of $28,665 versus $18,210 for females. The per capita income for the county was $14,548. About 19.40% of families and 23.70% of the population were below the poverty line, including 32.90% of those under age 18 and 18.90% of those age 65 or over.

== Communities ==
=== City ===
- Louisville (county seat)

=== Towns ===
- Noxapater

=== Unincorporated communities ===
- Highpoint
- Nanih Waiya
- Vernon
- Rocky Hill

=== Ghost towns ===
- Perkinsville
- Randalls Bluff
- Singleton

== Education ==
There is one school district in the entire county, the Louisville Municipal School District. There are three public high schools in Winston County: Louisville High School (Louisville Wildcats), Nanih Waiya Attendance Center (Nanih Waiya Warriors) and Noxapater Attendance Center (Noxapater Tigers).

In addition, there are two private schools, Winston Academy also known as (W.A.) or (Winston Patriots), established in 1969 as a segregation academy, and Grace Christian School (Eagles) in Louisville, which was founded in 1970.

East Central Community College (formerly East Central Junior College) is the community college of Winston County. The county joined the college's service area in 1935.

== Politics ==
Winston County has voted majority Republican since 1980, often by double digits, despite nearly half of the population being African American, a demographic which tends to lean Democratic.

United States presidential election results for Winston County, Mississippi
Year	Republican		Democratic		Third party(ies)	
Year	No.	%	No.	%	No.	%
1912	9	1.09%	743	90.39%	70	8.52%
1916	47	3.83%	1,152	93.96%	27	2.20%
1920	113	10.64%	932	87.76%	17	1.60%
1924	53	3.79%	1,344	96.21%	0	0.00%
1928	97	5.65%	1,620	94.35%	0	0.00%
1932	12	0.69%	1,720	99.08%	4	0.23%
1936	21	0.86%	2,418	99.10%	1	0.04%
1940	26	1.30%	1,979	98.70%	0	0.00%
1944	51	2.72%	1,822	97.28%	0	0.00%
1948	33	1.57%	240	11.40%	1,832	87.03%
1952	771	23.15%	2,559	76.85%	0	0.00%
1956	361	13.35%	2,132	78.82%	212	7.84%
1960	405	13.65%	1,056	35.60%	1,505	50.74%
1964	3,922	94.30%	237	5.70%	0	0.00%
1968	508	8.39%	911	15.05%	4,635	76.56%
1972	5,155	78.64%	1,354	20.66%	46	0.70%
1976	3,659	46.96%	3,956	50.77%	177	2.27%
1980	3,998	46.79%	4,416	51.68%	131	1.53%
1984	5,192	59.36%	3,543	40.51%	11	0.13%
1988	5,317	57.61%	3,851	41.73%	61	0.66%
1992	4,311	48.07%	3,953	44.08%	704	7.85%
1996	3,498	47.03%	3,488	46.89%	452	6.08%
2000	4,645	55.51%	3,672	43.88%	51	0.61%
2004	5,386	57.24%	3,978	42.28%	45	0.48%
2008	5,497	53.78%	4,653	45.52%	71	0.69%
2012	5,168	52.58%	4,607	46.87%	54	0.55%
2016	4,910	55.29%	3,850	43.35%	121	1.36%
2020	5,112	55.35%	4,040	43.74%	84	0.91%
2024	4,922	58.71%	3,392	40.46%	70	0.83%

== Notable person ==
- Andy Kennedy - basketball player and coach

== See also ==
- National Register of Historic Places listings in Winston County, Mississippi
