= William Jernagin =

American Baptist minister, activist (1869–1958)

William Henry Jernagin
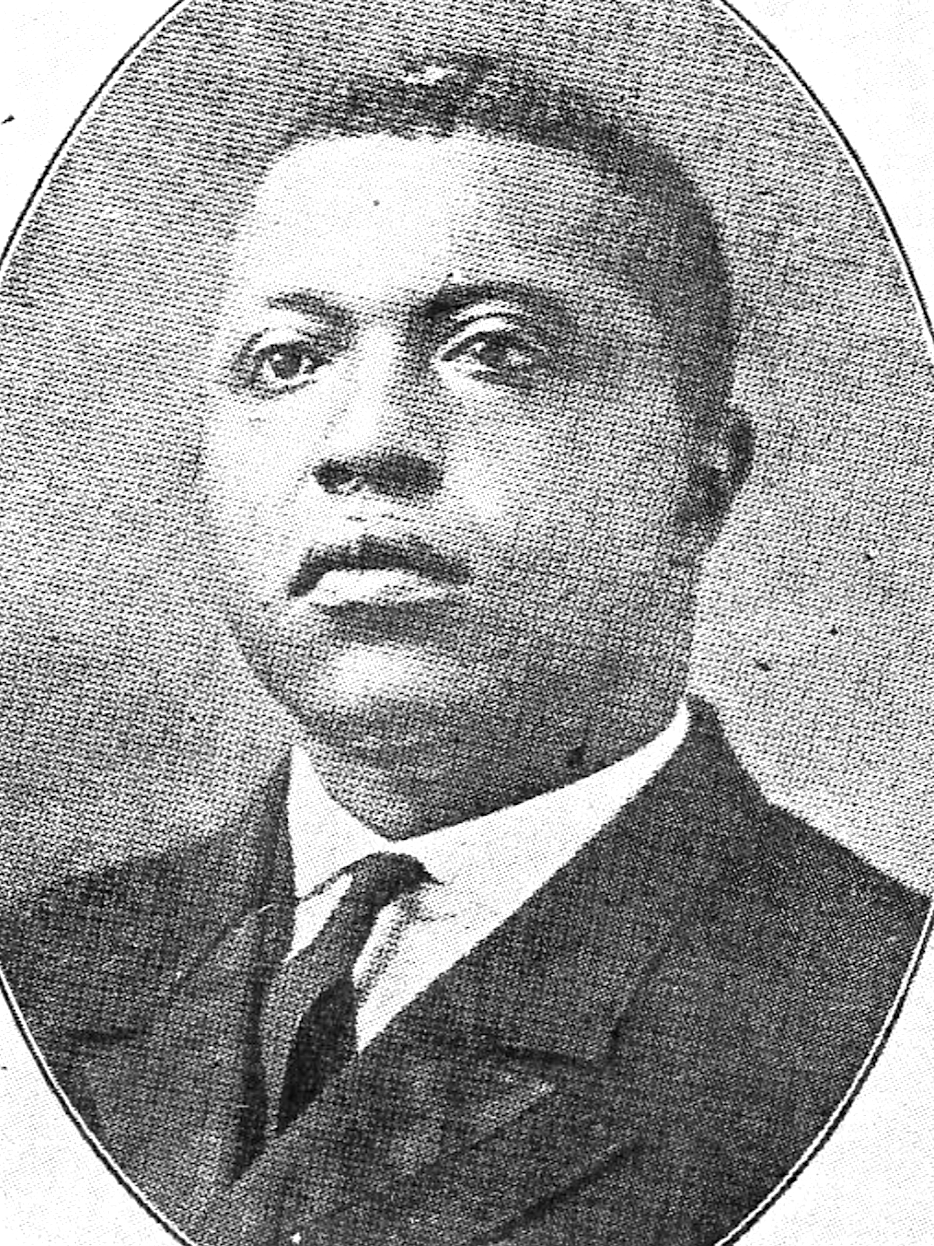
- Born: October 13, 1869; Mashulaville, Mississippi, U.S.
- Died: February 18, 1958 (aged 88); Miami, Florida, U.S.
- Other names: W.H. Jernagin
- Occupations: Minister, activist
- Known for: Baptist minister

Rev. William Henry Jernagin (October 13, 1869 – February 18, 1958) was an African-American Baptist pastor, an important figure in the civil rights movement (1896–1954), and Pan-African activist. The National Race Congress selected Jernagin to attend the Paris Peace Conference and the First Pan-African Congress in 1919.

== Early life ==
William Henry Jernagin was born in Mashulaville, Mississippi, on October 13, 1869, to Allen Fletcher Jernagin and Julia Ruth Walker. While his parents were mostly illiterate, they managed to obtain a small 40-acre farm upon which they grew a variety of fruits and vegetables. His family worked primarily harvesting apples and peaches for Juke Jernagin, a former slave owner. In the breaks between the sowing and reaping seasons, William attended a number of public schools in the Noxubee and Lauderdale Counties, among them Meridian Academy, Alcorn A&M College (now Alcorn State University), and Jackson College. In addition, he attended American Correspondence School located in Danville, N.Y.

== First steps ==
After working in a school in Lauderdale County for roughly five years, Jernagin was licensed to preach by the Bush Fork Baptist Church of Mississippi. In 1892, two years after his pastoral licensing, the 23-year-old Jernagin was called to preach at a number of Mississippi Baptist Churches including: New Prospect Baptist Church in Meridian, Mississippi, Mount Moriah Baptist Church, and Scooba Baptist Church in Okolona, Mississippi.

The year of 1896 was a busy one for Jernagin, who worked to unite a number of churches, among them: Missionary Union Baptist Church, First Baptist Church in Winona, Mississippi, Second Baptist Church, First Baptist Church in Mound Bayou, Mississippi, First Baptist Church in Brandon, Mississippi, and Tabernacle Baptist Church in Oklahoma City, Oklahoma. During this year, he founded Mississippi's Meridian Baptist Seminary, which was among the first educational institutions for African Americans east of the Mississippi River and helped establish an educational standard for African-American Baptist pastors. In addition, he became the president of the Oklahoma General Baptist Convention, aided in the establishment of the Winona-Granada Baptist College, and organized the Young People's Christian Educational Congress of Mississippi.

In 1905, following his rapid string of accomplishments for the church and well-received pastorates all across the state of Mississippi, Jernagin was appointed to the Tabernacle Baptist Church, which led him to move to Oklahoma City, Oklahoma. An article run by the Oklahoma Safeguard on July 6, 1905, stated of the young pastor: "The installation of Reverend W.H. Jernagin as pastor of the Tabernacle Baptist Church, of Oklahoma City was pulled off last Sunday in good shape. Rev. Jernagin, seated away back in that fine church, confronted with an audience of from five hundred to eight hundred, surrounded by all the big preachers, lawyers, doctors, teachers and big men of that great city, looked as though he was old Pope Leo."

He served as Tabernacle's pastor for nine years and used his position in the community and personal influence within the National Baptist Convention (NBC) to engage a number of statewide and nationwide problems relating to Jim Crow policies. With the aid of others, Jernagin formed the State Constitutional League of Oklahoma whose expressed goal was to "secure the manhood rights of the race [sic] in concert with rights anticipated by other Americans". Jernagin himself testified in court advocating against the admission of the Oklahoma territory and Indian territory into the United States, decrying the idea as a move that would further entrench Jim Crow laws. William Harrison, a local attorney based out of Oklahoma City, aided the State Constitutional League in bringing a suit before the United States Supreme Court. A key feature of the case involved the Interstate Passenger Law. "Harrison knew [that the] success [of the case] would put an end to all 'Jim Crowism' as far as interstate passengers were concerned."

== Move to Washington, D.C. ==
In 1912, Reverend Jernagin was appointed to serve in Washington, D.C., at the Mount Carmel Baptist Church. While this move marked the end of his residence in the state of Oklahoma, his influence in the state's affairs certainly never abated. On November 16, 1912, The Washington Bee, a prominent African-American weekly newspaper based in Washington, D.C., said of his installation and ensuing pastorate: "[Jernagin] is a wide-awake man. He is an eloquent and logical speaker, and his people think the world of him. [ ... ] there has never been a man at this church who has ever been more honored and respected than [Jernagin] ... it is quite evident ... that his administration will be a success". He would go on to serve the Mount Carmel congregation and the broader D.C. community with distinction for an illustrious 46-year term until his death in 1958.

During his first few years of serving in the nation's capital, Jernagin's position and clout within the National Baptist Convention continued to increase. Additionally, his influence in the surrounding communities steadily rose as he expanded his social networks to include key individuals, most notably: The Washington Bee publisher William Calvin Chase, activist and newspaper editor William Monroe Trotter, fellow Baptist, Reverend Walter Henderson Brooks, educator and founder of the National Training School for Women and Girls Nannie Helen Burroughs, and clubwoman Mary Church Terrell. These individuals supported Jernagin, effectively and efficiently "incorporating him into the organizations and issues that advocated for civil and human rights", while also providing him a myriad of sociopolitical avenues to approach the racial and religious issues he sought to engage with.

== Attending the Pan-African Congress (1919, 1921) ==
During the years following the close of the First World War, Jernagin's voice and influence rose as his positions within such organizations as the National Baptist Convention and the National Race Conference invited significant crossover between his promotion of Christian ideals and his fight for black rights around the globe.

As the president of the National Race Conference (NRC), which later consolidated with National Equal Rights League (of which William Monroe Trotter was closely associated, Jernagin traveled to Europe to attend the Pan-African Congress (PAC) to serve as a delegate for the NRC. While he missed the first day of the meeting, he was present for the business session and bore witness to the nine-point resolution that was released on March 29, 1919, which read: "The Negroes of the world in [PAC] assembled demand for the interests of justice and humanity and for strengthening the forces of civilization that immediate steps be taken to develop the 200,000,000 of Negroes and Negroids. To this end we propose: That the allied and associated powers establish a code of laws similar to the proposed international code of labor. The League of Nations establish a permanent bureau, charged with the special duty of overseeing the application of these laws to the political, social and economic welfare of the natives. The Negroes of the world demand that hereafter the natives of Africa and the peoples of Africa [sic] descent be governed according to the following principles: [land, capital, labor, education, medicine/ hygiene, the state, culture/religion, civilized Negroes and the League of Nations]."

In addition to attending the PAC, Jernagin also used his time in Paris, France, to visit some black troops stationed there. In an article published in the Kansas City Advocate on May 2, 1919, he reported on the dismal treatment some of the servicemen had received, stating: "The Negro, especially of the labor battalions, had not received a square deal in France, and white officers had carried their race prejudice into France, and had not failed to exhibit it when the occasion presented itself. But I thank God I am able to say to you that in the face of all this our boys discharged their duty and are war heroes. Some of them died, and at the command marched into death like they were going into a banquet hall. The world will give them credit of being soldiers. We must do it ourselves, and not depend on others." Jernagin later attended the Pan-African Congress of 1921, held in London, England. In 1920, following the Paris Peace Conference Jernagin and the NRC welcomed the President-elect C. D. B. King of Liberia. Following the introduction and entertainment of the President-elect, the NRC pledged its support to the Liberian people, considering it a "Sister Republic" and "the open door through which the New World might entertain life in Africa." His involvement with the PAC and the subsequent international relationships forged as a result illustrates Jernagin's steadfast dedication to the ending of "colonial rule, racial discrimination and imperialism in Africa and the Caribbean, while also demanding basic human rights and equality of economic opportunity."

== Involvement with the National Fraternal Council of Negro Churches ==
The National Fraternal Council of Negro Churches (NFCNC) was formed in 1933 after Bishop Reverdy C. Ransom (of the African Methodist Episcopal Church) issued an appeal to black ministers to meet and discuss possibly forming an organization that would serve as an African-American-oriented Federal Council of Churches. The first meeting of the NFCNC was held at Mount Carmel Church. Of the organization's formation, Ransom stated: "Impelled by a deep sense of the need of our racial group for an authoritative voice to speak for us on social, economic, industrial and political questions and believing that a united Negro church could best supply this need, a number of interested churchmen met in Washington and bound themselves together in what they designated as a Voluntary Committee on the Federation of Negro Religious Denominations in the United States of America."

Jernagin served as the NFCNC's president from 1938 to 1939, as the Council's chair from 1940 to1945 and later from 1952 to 1958. In addition, he created the Washington Bureau Committee, a branch of the NFCNC that he later separated from the parent organization. Jernagin would resign from his position at the Washington Bureau as a result of conflict, but regained his position as the chair of the NFCNC in 1952, a position he would hold until his death six years later. "With both the Washington Bureau and the executive committee under his command, Jernagin in effect was the NFCNC" Jernagin's Washington Bureau "met and corresponded with presidents Roosevelt to [Eisenhower]; testified before House and Senate Committees on such issues as the FEPC, anti-lynching and anti–poll tax bills, desegregation of interstate travel, housing and education aid, civil rights for [Washington] and the 1957 Civil Rights Act." Jernagin's Washington Bureau "served as the de facto voice of the black church on executive and legislative matters in the struggle to secure civil rights."

== Death and legacy ==
Reverend William Jernagin died on February 18, 1958, while on vacation in Miami, Florida. Following his death, the Baltimore Afro-American reported: "A positive leader [is] one who takes a firm stand and does not equivocate. For years [Jernagin] has been recognized as the 'watchdog of the race' at the Nation's capital, both as a race leader and a denominational leader." A number of prominent figures from a variety of backgrounds published statements regarding Jernagin's life and legacy, most notable among them: Martin Luther King Jr., Mordecai Johnson, E. Pauline Myers, and Andrew Fowler. King noted, "[Jernagin] has given to the Baptist youth of America a leadership which will long be recorded in the annals of history. He has inspired thousands of young men and women. I will always remember the encouragement that he has given me." Myers recalled, "There was no vain gloriousness [sic] about him. The common people loved him for he was one of them himself." Jernagin's legacy can be characterized as one where the intersection of faith and civil always brought about useful change and dialogue.

== Quotes ==
I shall speak far less, I trust, as a Negro than as a representative of the Christian Church whose duty it is to uphold the Christian ideals and to work for their realization with the belief that the conventions and customs of society can be changed by the persistent pressure of Christian influences. As churchmen, we have respect for government and believe that reasonable, intelligent administration can achieve results 'if the spirit is right.' At this hour of crisis the church is concerned specifically with economic distress which deepens as the world crisis develops. When the war ends jobs will disappear for from one to twenty million workers in war production in [America]. It is needless to say, minority groups will suffer most due to manpower surplus. There is no hatred and strife bitter than that which can come when people of different races compete for too little food and too few jobs. We would be morally derelict in our Christian duty if we failed to call attention to the unethical basis of an order which permits this kind of distress to continue. The church must exert its influence to eliminate the causes of economic distress and also to help to set in motion those administrative and legislative measures which must be taken as a preliminary to the establishment of a just social and economic system.

— (excerpt from) William Henry Jernagin's testimony before the Subcommittee of the Committee on Education and Labor in the U.S. Senate pushing for the passage of the Fair Employment Practices Act.

Nothing suits the devil more than when a strong man decides that he is going to give up the fight. I am not going to give up. I am going to ask God for more faith and fight for the thing that is right regardless to whom may differ. I have stood alone in a number of things but I have seen them come to pass. It is when we are willing to stand alone when God comes to our rescue.

— William Henry Jernagin, in a letter to Benjamin Mays on February 17, 1951.

In this age, we must be aggressive or perish. We must be progressive, and we must seize every lawful opportunity to sustain ourselves as individuals and sustain ourselves as a Race. The leaders of our race should collaborate on the best possible means for obtaining the unity and harmony that will result in an outstanding success. Progress should be the password and by word of every Negro. It is his salvation in a chaotic and war-torn world.

— William Henry Jernagin, in a newspaper article titled "Aggressive or Perish" (presently a news clipping contained within the Mount Carmel Baptist Church Archives (MCBCA))

What the color[ed] man will be in this country depends not on what others may do for him, but what he does for himself, and it is time we were doing something.

— William Henry Jernagin, in a call for a Colored Conference to be held at Mount Carmel in September 1916.

So long as we have the badge in our faces, and centuries will pass before we lose that, if ever, we shall remind mankind of that lowly state from which we have, through the mercy of God, had opportunity to rise…Race progress must be built upon racial self-respect. But racial self-respect cannot be built upon anything but racial history.

— William Henry Jernagin, in his Emancipation celebration address "New Freedom", January 1, 1934.

There have been 3 great emancipations—That of the body, that of the mind, such as come from schooling and finally that of the spirit when we know we are free of fear because we know the eternal truth which is God revealed through Jesus Christ…God is not mocked, neither will He keep his anger forever, and as we arrive at the full stature of citizenship and the knowledge of the privilege and duties of the suffrage we shall assume that right and its obligations as is being gradually proven in every section of this land

— William Henry Jernagin, in his Emancipation celebration address "New Freedom", January 1, 1934.

== Texts ==
- Jernagin, W. H., A. H. Waters, & L. T. Gordon (1930), "Proceedings of the Annual Meeting of the Association for the Study of Negro Life and History Held in Washington D.C., October 27–31, 1929", in The Journal of Negro History, Vol. 15, No. 1 (January 1930), pp. 1–13.
