= The Baptist Church of Christ at Sardis =

Historic church in Mississippi, United States

- U.S. National Register of Historic Places
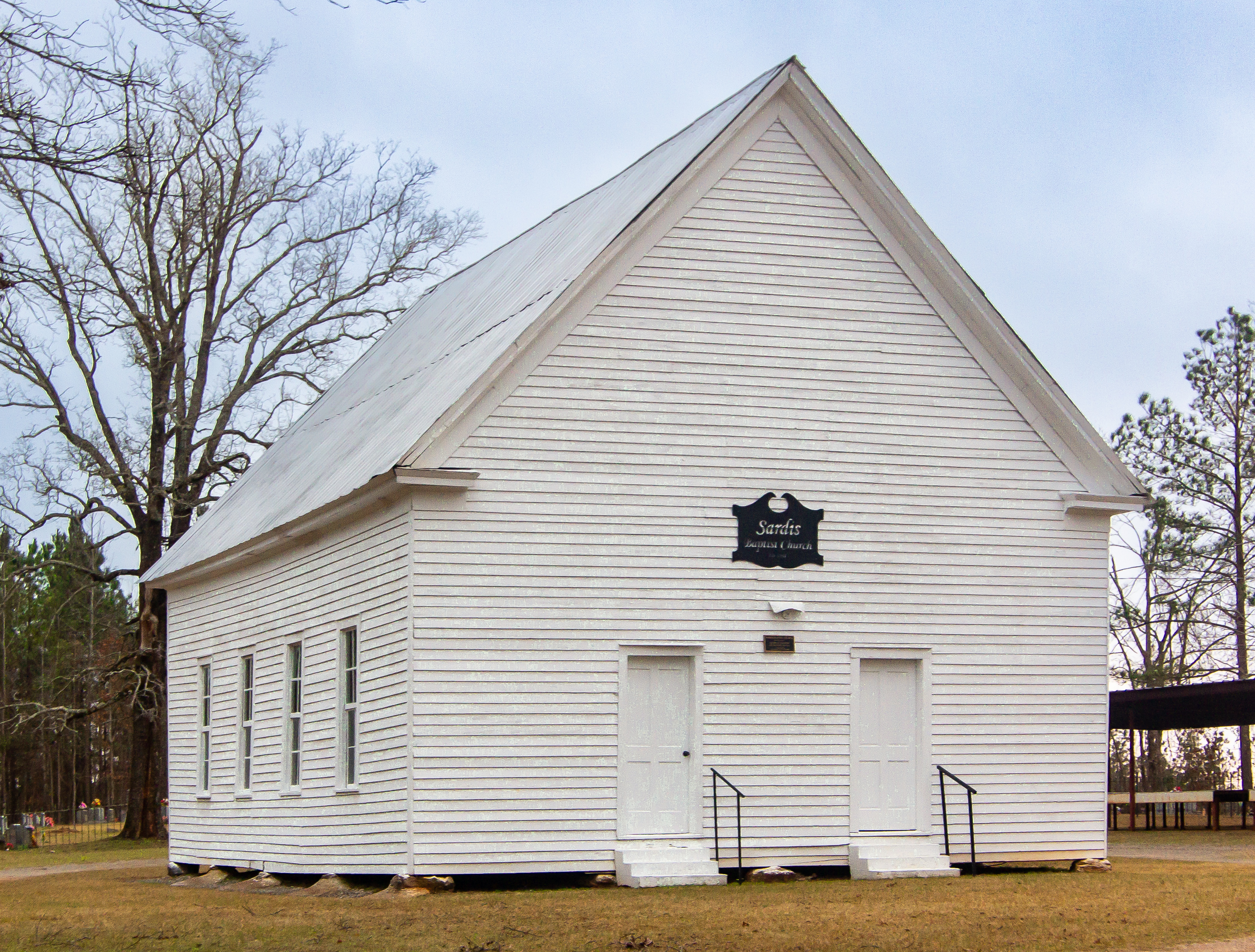

- Location within Mississippi
- Location: 2185 Sardis Road, Louisville, Mississippi
- Coordinates: 33°03′19″N 88°51′13″W
- NRHP reference No.: 11000110
- Added to NRHP: March 21, 2011

The Baptist Church of Christ at Sardis is a church built in 1917 of the partially extinct denomination (the Baptist Church of Christ) in Mississippi. The building is one room with symmetrically placed front doors. The timber used to build it was from the local communities, and milled onsite. Both the pews and the pulpit are original, as is most of the structure. In the early 2010s, David Preziosi, executive of the National Register of Historic Places in Mississippi nominated it for historic research. This was granted to him on March 21, 2011. Today, the building is placed as a historic site as well as a genealogical center as it has a cemetery with many people who used to live near there.
