= Doug Cunningham (American football) =

American football player (1945–2015)

No. 42, 40
- Position: Running back

Personal information
- Born: September 14, 1945; Louisville, Mississippi, U.S.
- Died: January 13, 2015 (aged 69); Jackson, Mississippi, U.S.
- Listed height: 6 ft 0 in (1.83 m)
- Listed weight: 200 lb (91 kg)

Career information
- High school: Louisville
- College: Mississippi
- NFL draft: 1967: 6th round, 145th overall pick

Career history
- San Francisco 49ers (1967–1973); Washington Redskins (1974)

Awards and highlights
- First-team All-SEC (1966)

Career NFL statistics
- Rushing yards: 1,515
- Rushing average: 3.7
- Receptions: 137
- Receiving yards: 1,171
- Total touchdowns: 10
- Stats at Pro Football Reference

Julian Douglas Cunningham (September 14, 1945 – January 13, 2015) was an American professional football running back in the National Football League (NFL) for the San Francisco 49ers and the Washington Redskins. He played college football at the University of Mississippi and was selected 145th overall in the sixth round of the 1967 NFL/AFL draft.

Cunningham was one of at least 345 NFL players to be diagnosed after death with chronic traumatic encephalopathy (CTE), which is caused by repeated hits to the head.
