= Perkinsville, Mississippi =

- Ghost town
- Location within the state of Mississippi
- Coordinates: 33°06′04″N 88°51′50″W
- Country: United States
- State: Mississippi
- County: Winston
- Elevation: 486 ft (148 m)
- Time zone: UTC-6 (Central (CST))
  - Summer (DST): UTC-5 (CDT)
- GNIS feature ID: 710063

Perkinsville is a ghost town in Winston County, Mississippi, United States.

Perkinsville was located approximately 10 mi (16 km) east of Louisville.

A fraternal lodge, No. 331, was located in Perkinsville in 1891.

The population of Perkinsville was 44 in 1900. The settlement had a post office, as well as "a church and a good school".

All that remains is the Perkinsville Cemetery, located on Perkinsville Road.
