= Marcus Thames =

American baseball player and coach (born 1977)

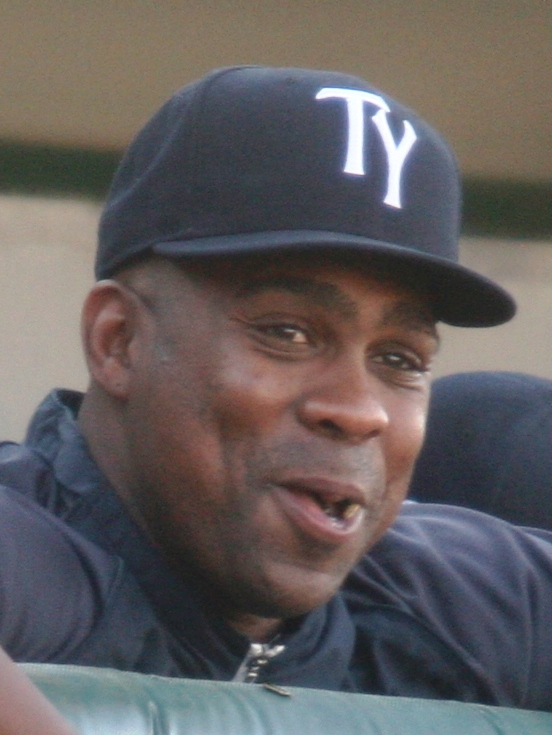
- Thames coaching the Tampa Yankees in 2013

Kansas City Royals – No. 99
- Left fielder / Designated hitter / Coach
- Born: March 6, 1977 (age 49); Louisville, Mississippi, U.S.
- Batted: Right Threw: Right

MLB debut
- June 10, 2002, for the New York Yankees

Last MLB appearance
- July 6, 2011, for the Los Angeles Dodgers

MLB statistics
- Batting average: .246
- Home runs: 115
- Runs batted in: 301
- Stats at Baseball Reference

Teams
- As player: New York Yankees (2002); Texas Rangers (2003); Detroit Tigers (2004–2009); New York Yankees (2010); Los Angeles Dodgers (2011); As coach: New York Yankees (2016–2021); Miami Marlins (2022); Los Angeles Angels (2023); Chicago White Sox (2024–2025); Kansas City Royals (2026–present)

Marcus Markley Thames (/ˈtɪmz/ TIMZ; born March 6, 1977) is an American professional baseball player and baseball coach who currently serves as a hitting coach for the Kansas City Royals of Major League Baseball (MLB). He played in MLB for the New York Yankees, Texas Rangers, Detroit Tigers, and Los Angeles Dodgers as a left fielder and designated hitter from 2002 through 2011. He coached with the Yankees from 2016 through 2021, the Miami Marlins in 2022, the Los Angeles Angels in 2023, and the Chicago White Sox in 2024 and 2025.

For his career, Thames averaged a home run every 15.9 at-bats and holds the Tigers franchise record for average at-bats per home run, at 14.8.

== Amateur career ==
Thames attended Louisville High School in Louisville, Mississippi, where he played baseball, basketball, and football. He attended East Central Community College in Decatur, Mississippi on a football scholarship and walked onto the baseball team in the spring of 1996.

== Professional career ==
=== New York Yankees ===
The New York Yankees selected Thames in the 30th round of the 1996 Major League Baseball draft. He decided to return to college for his junior year before signing with the Yankees before their signing rights expired. By 2001, Thames was in his third year at the Double-A level. At the age of 24, he hit .321 with 31 home runs and 97 RBI with the Norwich Navigators to earn himself some recognition as a prospect.

He was promoted to Triple-A in 2002, but failed to duplicate his success from the previous year. Thames made his major league debut for the Yankees on June 10, 2002. He hit a home run in his first at bat on the very first pitch he saw from Randy Johnson of the Arizona Diamondbacks.

=== Texas Rangers ===
On June 6, 2003, the Yankees, who were looking for a left-handed batter, traded Thames to the Texas Rangers for Rubén Sierra. Thames hit a home run in his first game with the Rangers. The Rangers released him after the season.

=== Detroit Tigers ===
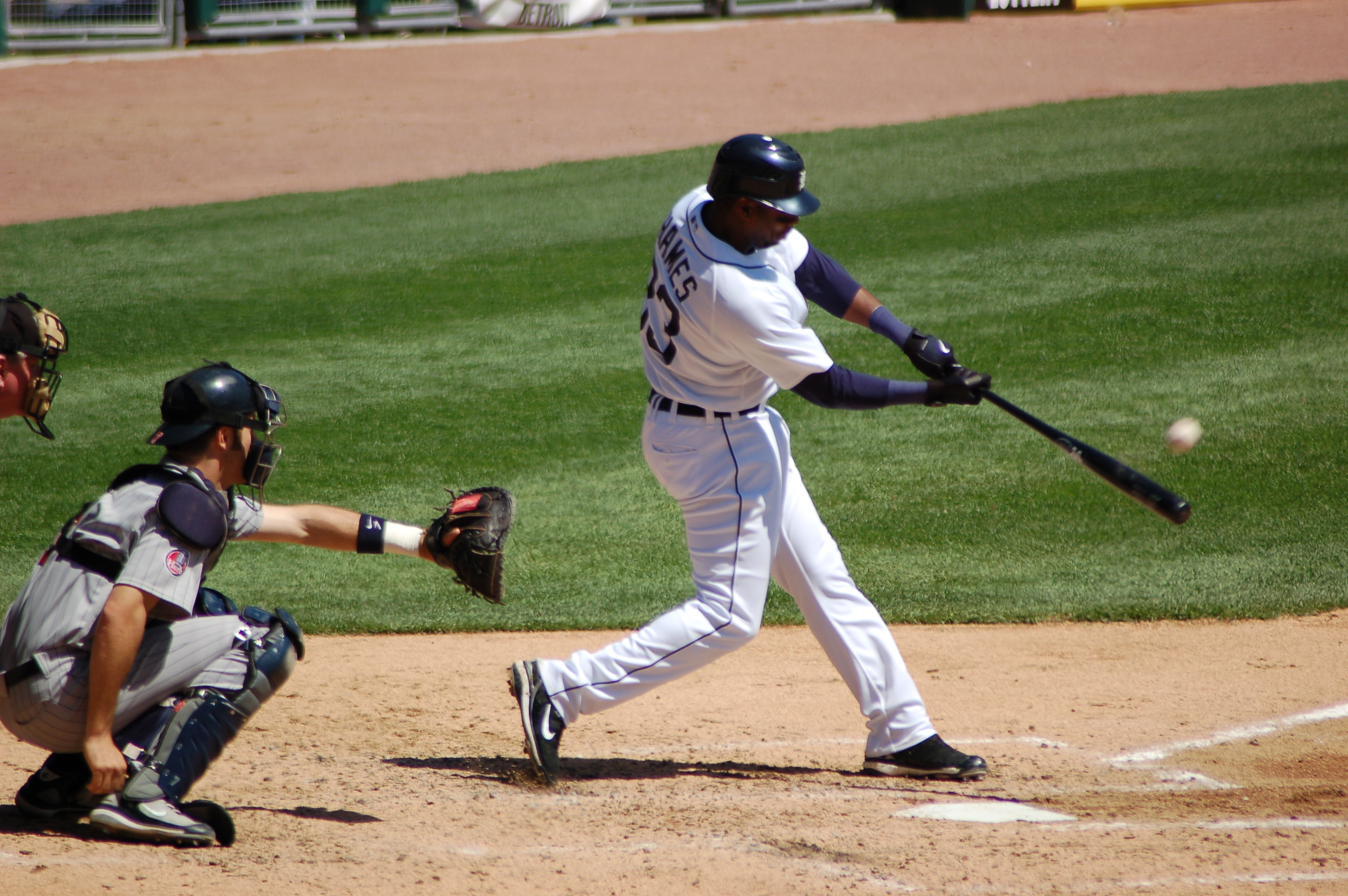
Thames with Tigers, 2007

He signed with the Detroit Tigers in December 2003. After hitting .321 with 24 home runs in Triple-A, Thames was called up to the majors on June 22, 2004. On July 25, he hit his first career grand slam. In 2005, Thames was the final roster cut of spring training. However, he was called up five games into the season and hit a grand slam in his first game. After hitting .188 with six home runs through June 12, he was optioned to Triple-A Toledo. Thames was a key part of the Toledo Mud Hens team that won the International League Governor's Cup that year. He was called up on September 17 to finish out the season.

Thames made the Tigers' 2006 opening day roster as the team's fourth outfielder. Despite his struggles in that role in the past, new manager Jim Leyland felt he earned the right to prove himself. Thames played a key role in a major victory against the Chicago White Sox on July 20. His takeout slide against second baseman Tadahito Iguchi in the seventh inning broke up an inning-ending double play that allowed the Tigers the opportunity to score the go-ahead run and take a commanding lead in the division. He set career highs in every offensive category that year, hitting .256 with 26 home runs and 60 RBI in only 348 at-bats, finishing with a solid .882 OPS. He was nicknamed "Country Strong" by then Tigers broadcaster Rod Allen. Thames had five hits as the starting DH in the 2006 ALDS against the Yankees.

In 2007, the Tigers had him learn how to play first base during spring training in order to get him more at-bats during the season. On July 1, Thames hit a solo home run in the bottom of the eighth inning to score the only run in the game in a victory over the Minnesota Twins. On July 6, he hit the third grand slam of his career at Comerica Park against the Boston Red Sox. On July 8, Thames hit a 440-foot home run to center field off Daisuke Matsuzaka. It was his 10th homer in just 131 at-bats.

During the 2008 season, Thames hit eight home runs in a seven-game stretch from June 11 to 17, becoming the first Tigers batter in team franchise history to achieve that feat. During that streak, he also homered in five consecutive games which tied the franchise record (shared with four other players). On June 21, Thames hit a pinch hit, two-run go-ahead home run in the seventh inning against the San Diego Padres.

When the Tigers released Gary Sheffield at the end of spring training in 2009, Thames was named the full-time designated hitter. However, he suffered a strained rib cage during batting practice on April 21 and was out until June 6. On August 9, Thames hit his 100th career home run. It took him just 1,549 at-bats to reach that mark, the fastest in MLB history. He was released from the Tigers at the end of the season after hitting .252 with 13 homers and 36 RBI.

=== New York Yankees (second stint) ===
Thames signed a minor league deal to return to the Yankees on February 8, 2010. He hit just .135 in 52 at-bats that spring, but he still made the team thanks to his track record against lefties. His contract was purchased at the end of spring training.

Thames began the season platooning in left field with Brett Gardner. However, he was soon moved to a bench role because of his poor defense and Gardner's ability to hit left-handed pitchers. Thames would see more regular starts in left when Gardner moved to center field in place of the injured Curtis Granderson. He also saw a few starts in right field when Nick Swisher was sidelined with an injury. However, in the latter part of the season, he rarely played the outfield, especially after the acquisition of Austin Kearns.

He hit .288 with 12 home runs in 82 games and had several big hits over the season. On May 17, he hit a walk-off home run against Red Sox closer Jonathan Papelbon. On July 4, Thames returned from a DL stint to hit a game-ending single against the Toronto Blue Jays. On July 29, Thames made his first professional career appearance at third base as a late-inning replacement, committing a throwing error in his only chance. On August 11, he helped the Yankees come back from a five-run deficit by hitting a home run in the eighth inning and a go-ahead single in the ninth inning to beat the Rangers. On August 24, Thames, Mark Teixeira, and Jorge Posada each hit a home run in the third inning against the Toronto Blue Jays. In a six-game stretch from August 24 to 30, he had 6 home runs and 11 RBIs in 21 at-bats.

Thames hit a two-run home run in Game 3 of the 2010 ALDS against the Minnesota Twins. It was his first postseason home run. During the 2010 ALCS, he batted in the go-ahead run during the Yankees' Game 1 win over the Texas Rangers. Thames served as the designated hitter when Lance Berkman took over first base and Mark Teixeira went on the disabled list with a hamstring injury.

=== Los Angeles Dodgers ===
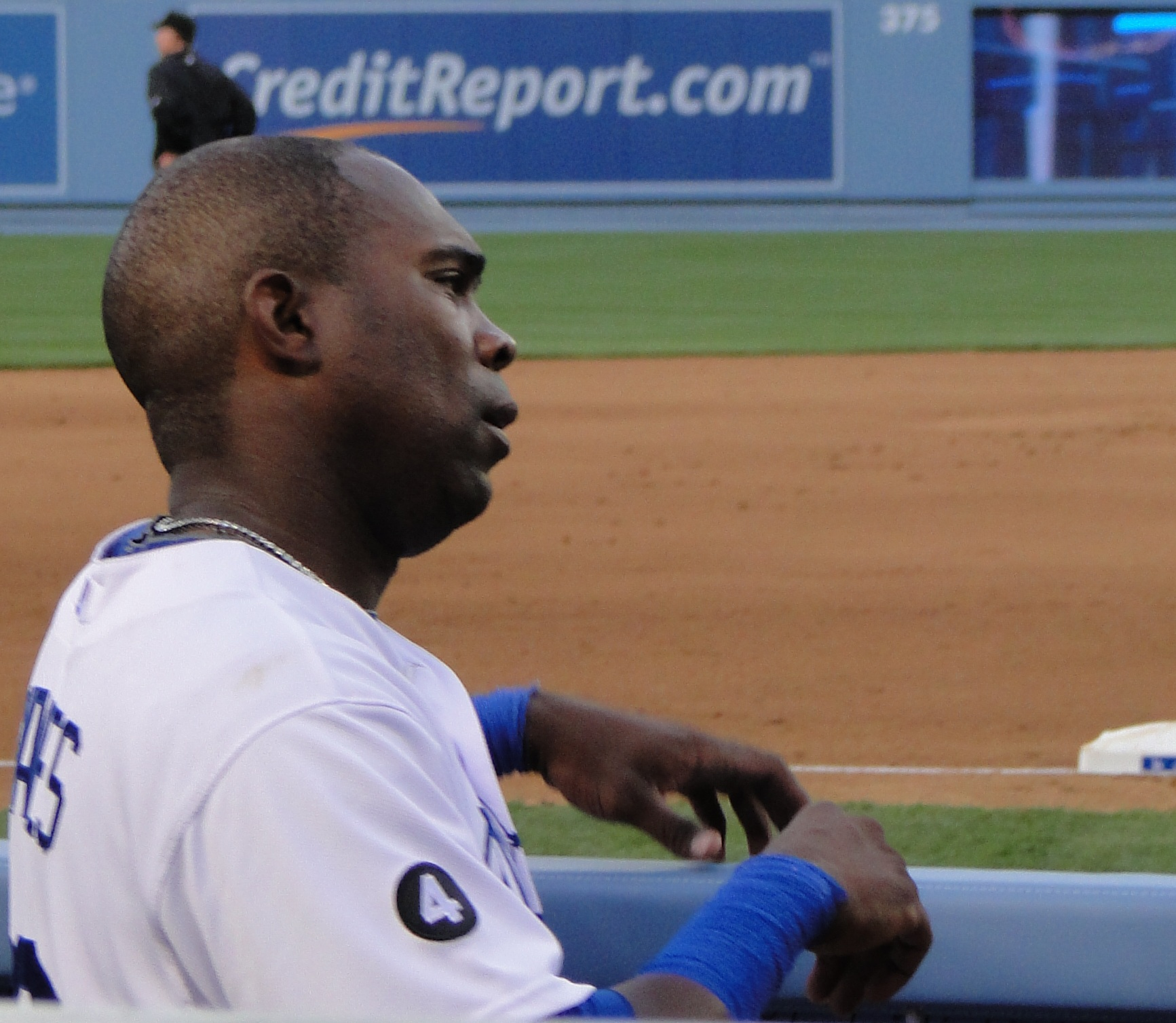
Thames with Dodgers, April 2011

Thames signed a one-year deal with the Los Angeles Dodgers for the 2011 season. He had two pinch-hit home runs in April, then went on the disabled list at the beginning of May with a quad strain and missed five weeks. He made 70 appearances for the Dodgers before being designated for assignment on July 12. He had a .197 batting average for Los Angeles. He was released on July 19.

=== New York Yankees (third stint) ===
On July 22, 2011, the New York Yankees signed Thames to a minor league deal. However, he never played in a game for the Yankees at any level of their system the rest of the season.

== Coaching career ==
=== New York Yankees ===
On January 10, 2013, Thames was named the hitting coach of the High-A Tampa Yankees. For the 2014 season, Marcus Thames was named the hitting coach of the New York Yankees' Double-A affiliate the Trenton Thunder. Top Yankees prospect Rob Refsnyder credited Thames with helping him rework his swing that allowed him to have his breakout 2014 season.

Thames was considered by the New York Yankees for their vacant hitting coach job and for a new role as assistant hitting coach prior to the 2015 season, but he ultimately was named hitting coach for the Yankees Triple-A affiliate the Scranton/Wilkes-Barre RailRiders.

After the 2015 season, the Yankees dismissed Jeff Pentland as their hitting coach, promoted Alan Cockrell, their assistant hitting coach, to replace him, and promoted Thames to the role of assistant hitting coach. After the 2017 season, the Yankees dismissed Alan Cockrell as their hitting coach and promoted Thames to hitting coach. Following the 2020 season, he interviewed for the Tigers' managerial opening. His contract was not renewed for the 2022 season.

=== Miami Marlins ===
On November 17, 2021, Thames was hired by the Miami Marlins to serve as the team's hitting coach for the 2022 season.

=== Los Angeles Angels ===
On November 7, 2022, the Los Angeles Angels hired Thames as their hitting coach for the 2023 season.

=== Chicago White Sox ===
On November 7, 2023, the Chicago White Sox hired Thames as their new hitting coach for the 2024 season. He was let go by the White Sox following the 2025 season.

=== Kansas City Royals ===
On November 10, 2025, the Kansas City Royals hired Thames and Connor Dawson to serve as a hitting coach under senior director of hitting Alec Zumwalt.

== Personal life ==
Thames's mother, Veterine, was paralyzed from the neck down. She was injured in a car accident in 1982 when Marcus was five years old. Thames and his five siblings helped take care of the house by cooking, cleaning, and taking odd jobs to make extra money. Because of her condition, she was only able to watch him play in person a handful of times. Veterine died in 2012.

Thames's nickname, "Slick", is the result of getting his hair cut too short when he was four years old.

Thames served in the Mississippi National Guard from 1994 to 1998. He was a platoon leader in basic training. After he joined the Yankees organization, Thames was granted leave and allowed to make up his Guard time in the offseason.

== See also ==
- List of Major League Baseball players with a home run in their first major league at bat

Sporting positions
| Preceded by Alan Cockrell | New York Yankees assistant hitting coach 2016–2017 | Succeeded by P. J. Pilittere |
| Preceded by Alan Cockrell | New York Yankees hitting coach 2018–2021 | Succeeded by Dillon Lawson |
| Preceded by Eric Duncan | Miami Marlins hitting coach 2022 | Succeeded by Brant Brown |
| Preceded by Jeremy Reed | Los Angeles Angels hitting coach 2023 | Succeeded by Johnny Washington |
| Preceded by José Castro | Chicago White Sox hitting coach 2024–2025 | Succeeded by TBA |
