= Mississippi Highway 826 =

Highway in Mississippi

Mississippi Highway 826
- MS 826 highlighted in blue

Route information
- Maintained by MDOT
- Length: 2.316 mi (3.727 km)
- Existed: c. 1957–present

Major junctions
- West end: MS 14 near Rolling Fork
- East end: US 61 near Rolling Fork

Location
- Country: United States
- State: Mississippi
- Counties: Sharkey

Highway system
- Mississippi State Highway System; Interstate; US; State
← MS 824	→ MS 830

Mississippi Highway 826 (MS 826) is a short state highway in western Mississippi. The route starts at U.S. Route 61 (US 61) south of Rolling Fork. The road then travels northward through farmland, and MS 826 ends at its intersection with MS 14, west of the town. The road was constructed in 1955 to bypass Rolling Fork, and the route was designated around 1957, after a proposal by Sharkey County to transfer the road to state maintenance.

== Route description ==
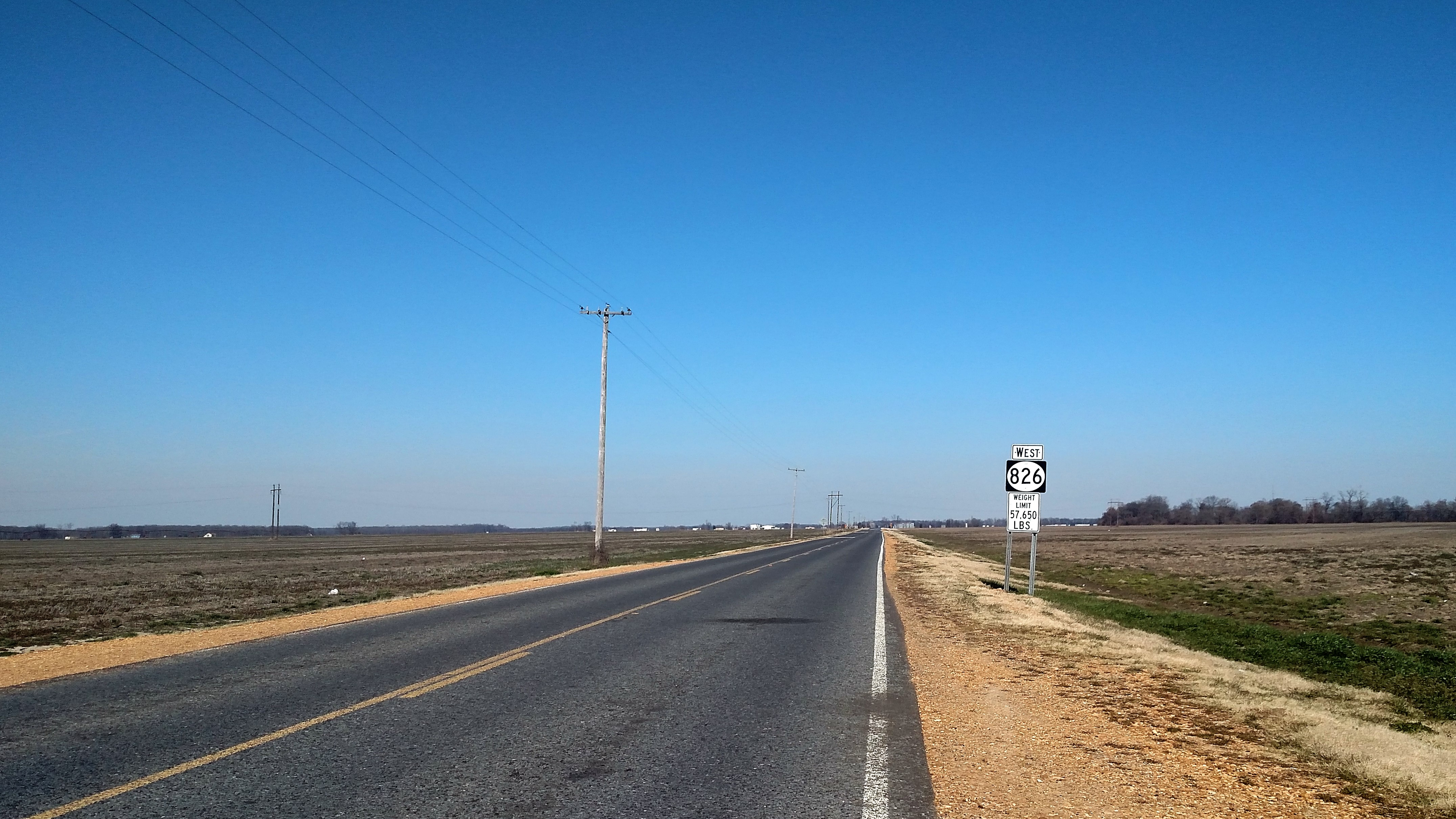
Reassurance marker along Highway 826

All of MS 826 is located in Sharkey County. In 2018, the Mississippi Department of Transportation (MDOT) calculated 690 vehicles traveling on MS 826 south of Ending Bar Road on average each day. The route is legally defined in Mississippi Code § 65-3-3, and it is maintained by MDOT and Sharkey County, as part of the Mississippi State Highway System.

The route starts at the intersection of US 61 and Fork Creek Road southwest of Rolling Fork. Surrounded by farmland, the road travels north and intersects a gravel road. MS 826 then intersects Ending Bar Road, which travels to the southern part of the town. The route continues northward and ends at MS 14, west of Rolling Fork. The road continues north as Burma Road, a gravel road that ends at MS 16 near Lorenzen.

== History ==
The road was paved around 1955 by Sharkey County, connecting US 61 to MS 14 and bypassing the town of Rolling Fork. It was built to relieve cross-country traffic travelling around Rolling Fork. Following a proposal by the Sharkey County Board of Supervisors in March 1955, the road was added to the state highway system by 1957.

== Major intersections ==
The entire route is in Sharkey County.

Location	mi	km	Destinations	Notes
	0.000	0.000	US 61	Southern terminus
	2.316	3.727	MS 14	Northern terminus
1.000 mi = 1.609 km; 1.000 km = 0.621 mi
