= Preston, Mississippi =

- Unincorporated community
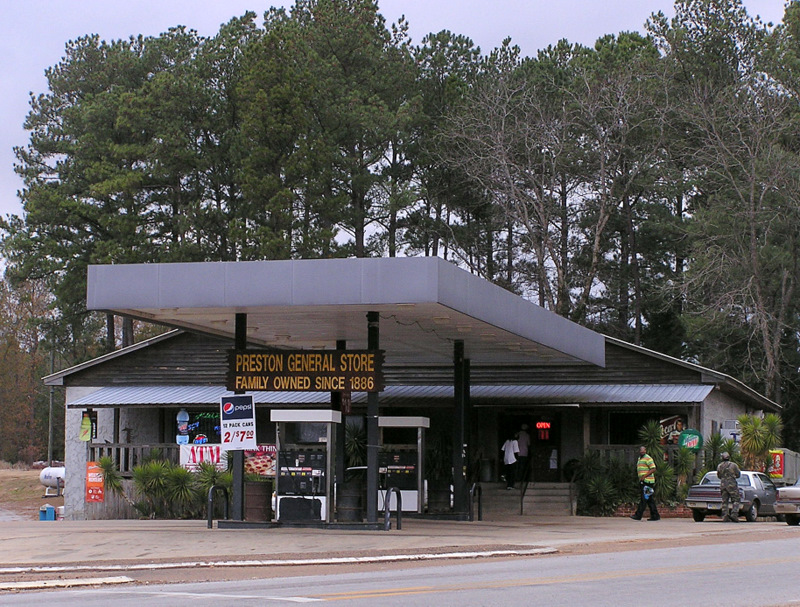
- Preston, Mississippi

- Location in Mississippi and the United States Preston (the United States)
- Coordinates: 32°52′57″N 88°49′44″W
- Country: United States
- State: Mississippi
- County: Kemper
- Elevation: 541 ft (165 m)
- Time zone: UTC-6 (Central (CST))
  - Summer (DST): UTC-5 (CDT)
- ZIP codes: 39354
- GNIS feature ID: 676327

Preston (also Pleasant Springs) is an unincorporated community in Kemper County, Mississippi. It lies at the intersection of State Highways 21 and 397 northwest of the city of De Kalb, the county seat of Kemper County. Its elevation is 541 feet (165 m). It has a post office with the ZIP code 39354.

== Notable people ==
- Michael Evans, member of the Mississippi House of Representatives
- Sampson Jackson, member of the Mississippi State Senate
