= Noxapater, Mississippi =

- Town
- Flag

- Location of Noxapater, Mississippi

- Location in the United States
- Coordinates: 32°59′32″N 89°3′50″W
- Country: United States
- State: Mississippi
- County: Winston

Area
  - Total: 1.01 sq mi (2.61 km^{2})
  - Land: 1.01 sq mi (2.61 km^{2})
  - Water: 0 sq mi (0.00 km^{2})
- Elevation: 548 ft (167 m)

Population (2020)
  - Total: 390
  - Density: 387.1/sq mi (149.47/km^{2})
- Time zone: UTC-6 (Central (CST))
  - Summer (DST): UTC-5 (CDT)
- ZIP code: 39346
- Area code: 662
- FIPS code: 28-52880
- GNIS feature ID: 0674982
- Website: www.noxapater.com

Noxapater is a town in Winston County, Mississippi. As of the 2020 census, Noxapater had a population of 390.

== History ==
The community takes its name from Noxapater Creek, which flows near the site. A post office was established in 1846, and the town was incorporated in 1906. Noxapater was a stop on the Mobile, Jackson and Kansas City Railroad, built in 1890.

In 1927, a mob of 1,000 white men, mostly from Louisville, lynched two African-Americans, Jim and Mark Fox. The Foxes were accused of killing a white man who started a fight with them.

== Geography ==
Noxapater is located at 32°59′32″N 89°3′50″W (32.992208, -89.063796).

According to the United States Census Bureau, the town has a total area of 1.0 square mile (2.6 km^{2}), all land.

== Demographics ==
Historical population
Census	Pop.	Note	%±
1910	311		—
1920	515		65.6%
1930	526		2.1%
1940	569		8.2%
1950	615		8.1%
1960	549		−10.7%
1970	554		0.9%
1980	516		−6.9%
1990	441		−14.5%
2000	419		−5.0%
2010	472		12.6%
2020	390		−17.4%
U.S. Decennial Census

At the 2000 census, there were 419 people, 171 households and 121 families residing in the town. The population density was 417.2 inhabitants per square mile (161.1/km^{2}). There were 191 housing units at an average density of 190.2 per square mile (73.4/km^{2}). The racial makeup of the town was 64.44% White and 35.56% African American.

There were 171 households, of which 30.4% had children under the age of 18 living with them, 48.0% were married couples living together, 18.7% had a female householder with no husband present, and 29.2% were non-families. 27.5% of all households were made up of individuals, and 17.5% had someone living alone who was 65 years of age or older. The average household size was 2.45 and the average family size was 2.96.

Age distribution was 24.6% under the age of 18, 7.4% from 18 to 24, 24.1% from 25 to 44, 25.1% from 45 to 64, and 18.9% who were 65 years of age or older. The median age was 41 years. For every 100 females, there were 80.6 males. For every 100 females age 18 and over, there were 71.7 males.

The median household income was $27,917, and the median family income was $28,750. Males had a median income of $25,500 versus $18,500 for females. The per capita income for the town was $13,658. About 16.9% of families and 18.4% of the population were below the poverty line, including 25.7% of those under age 18 and 9.5% of those age 65 or over.

== Education ==
The Town of Noxapater is within the Louisville Municipal School District, which covers the entire county. Its school is Noxapater Attendance Center, which covers grades Kindergarten through 12.

East Central Community College is the community college of Winston County.

== Notable people ==
- F. Mason Sones, pioneer in cardiac catheterization.

Van Chancellor Basketball coach
