= Cochrane, Alabama =

Unincorporated community in Alabama, United States

- Unincorporated community
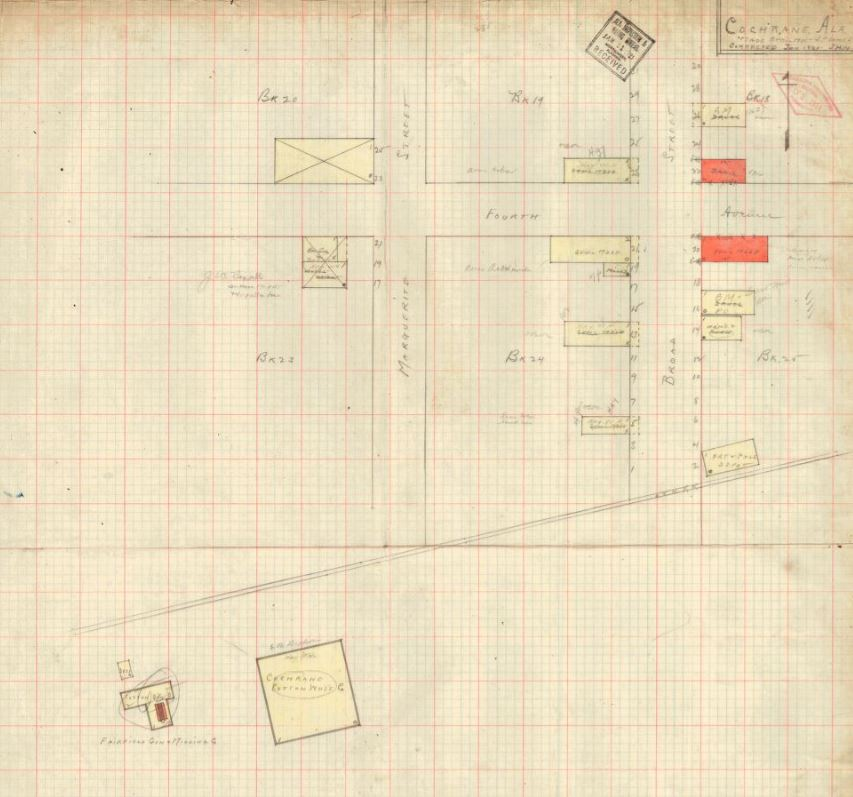
- 1911 fire insurance map of Cochrane

- Location within Alabama Location within the United States
- Coordinates: 33°21′56″N 88°07′11″W
- Country: United States
- State: Alabama
- County: Pickens
- Elevation: 172 ft (52 m)
- Time zone: UTC-6 (Central (CST))
  - Summer (DST): UTC-5 (CDT)
- Area codes: 205, 659
- GNIS feature ID: 116336

Cochrane is an unincorporated community in Pickens County, Alabama, United States.

== History ==
Cochrane is named for John T. Cochrane, the founder of Aliceville, Alabama. Cochrane served as the superintendent of the Tuscaloosa Belt Line, which was part of the Alabama, Tennessee and Northern Railroad. A post office operated under the name Cochrane from 1907 to 1972.

The John T. Milner Bridge, located in Cochrane, was the first toll bridge in Alabama to be officially dedicated.
