= Louisville Municipal School District =

School district in Mississippi

The Louisville Municipal School District is a public school district based in Louisville, Mississippi (USA). The district's boundaries parallel that of Winston County.

== History ==
The first public school in Louisville was established in 1872. Winston County Schools and Louisville City Schools were consolidated in 1960 to become the Louisville Municipal School District.

== Schools ==
- Louisville High School (Grades 9-12)
- Eiland Middle School (Grades 6-8)
- Louisville Elementary School (Grades 3-5)
- Fair Elementary School (Grades Pre-K-2)
- Nanih Waiya School (Grades K-12)
- Noxapater School (Grades K-12)

== Demographics ==
=== 2006-07 school year ===
There were a total of 2,883 students enrolled in the Louisville Municipal School District during the 2006–2007 school year. The gender makeup of the district was 49% female and 51% male. The racial makeup of the district was 63.65% African American, 34.69% White, 1.18% Native American, 0.35% Hispanic, and 0.14% Asian. 66.7% of the district's students were eligible to receive free lunch.

=== Previous school years ===
School Year	Enrollment	Gender Makeup		Racial Makeup				
School Year	Enrollment	Female	Male	Asian	African American	Hispanic	Native American	White
2005-06	2,908	48%	52%	0.21%	63.03%	0.31%	1.38%	35.08%
2004-05	2,911	48%	52%	0.27%	62.73%	0.31%	1.41%	35.28%
2003-04	2,965	48%	52%	0.27%	63.14%	0.24%	1.38%	34.97%
2002-03	3,041	47%	53%	0.26%	63.60%	0.26%	1.32%	34.56%

== Accountability statistics ==
	2006-07	2005-06	2004-05	2003-04	2002-03
District Accreditation Status	Accredited	Accredited	Accredited	Accredited	Accredited
School Performance Classifications
Level 5 (Superior Performing) Schools	0	0	0	0	0
Level 4 (Exemplary) Schools	1	1	3	2	1
Level 3 (Successful) Schools	4	5	3	3	4
Level 2 (Under Performing) Schools	1	0	0	1	1
Level 1 (Low Performing) Schools	0	0	0	0	0
Not Assigned	0	0	0	0	0

== See also ==
- List of school districts in Mississippi
