= Foster-Fair House =

Historic house in Mississippi, United States

- Foster--Fair House
- U.S. National Register of Historic Places
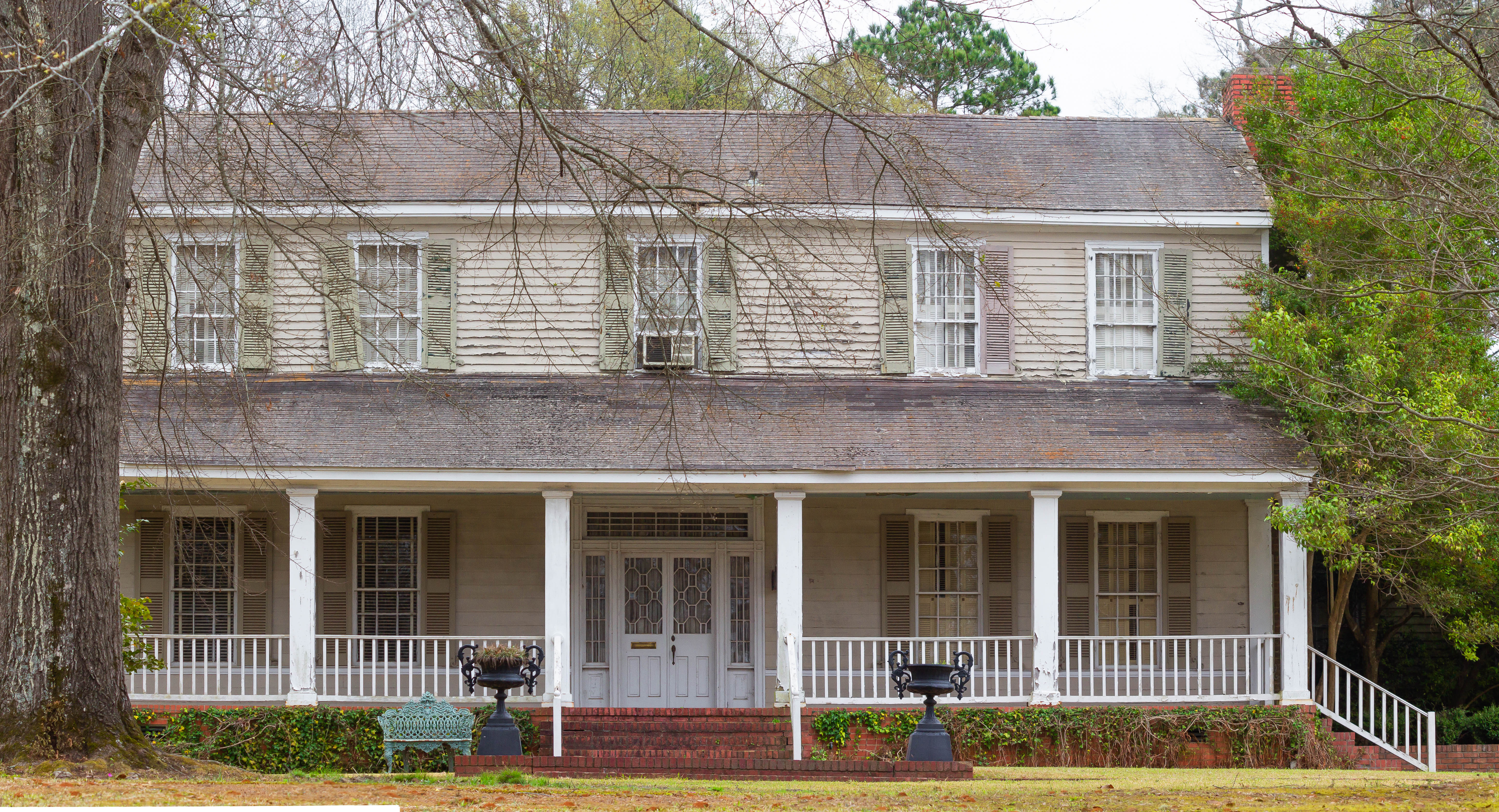

- Location within Mississippi
- Location: 507 South Columbus Avenue, Louisville, Mississippi
- Coordinates: 33°07′04″N 89°03′09″W
- Area: 1.3 acres (0.53 ha)
- Architectural style: carolina I-house
- NRHP reference No.: 00000332
- Added to NRHP: November 29, 2000

The Foster-Fair House is a historic two-story house in Louisville, Mississippi. It was built in 1842 by Samuel Washington Smyth. It was later acquired by Dr. Edward Foster, a settler and physician who was related to Vice President John C. Calhoun, in 1852.

The property was designed as an I-house, with Greek Revival features. It has been listed on the National Register of Historic Places since November 29, 2000.
