= Lynching of Jim and Mark Fox =

1927 killing of two Black men in Mississippi

- Location: Louisville, Mississippi, U.S.
- Date: June 13, 1927; 99 years ago
- Attack type: Lynching
- Deaths: 2
- Victims: Jim Fox; Mark Fox
- Perpetrator: Mob of 1,000 white men from Louisville
- Motive: Retaliation for the alleged killing of a white sawmill superintendent

Jim and Mark Fox were two African-American brothers, who were murdered in Louisville, Mississippi, in 1927. On June 13, 1927, a mob of 1,000 white men from Louisville lynched two African-Americans, Jim and Mark Fox. In the aftermath of the Great Mississippi Flood of 1927, the Fox brothers were working in or for a Red Cross camp, and got into an argument with a white sawmill superintendent, allegedly killing him. The argument apparently concerned work hours. The two brothers were seized by a crowd and paraded through Louisville; then they were tied to a telephone pole, doused in gasoline, and burned alive. An onlooker who tried to help them was pulled away by the crowd.
