= Andrew Fowler (Baptist minister) =

American pastor

- Born: February 23, 1910; Inman, Spartanburg County, South Carolina
- Died: January 4, 2003; Washington, D.C.
- Citizenship: United States of America
- Education: Tuskegee Institute, BS Howard University, BD, MA Lynchburg Seminary and College, DDiv
- Occupation(s): Baptist Pastor, Educator, Political and Religious Advisor, and Civil Rights Activist
- Organization(s): Pastor, Capital View Baptist Church President, Washington Baptist Theological Seminary Director, Washington Bureau of the NFCNC Executive Secretary, Committee of 100 Ministers President, Baptist Convention of D.C. and Vicinity
- Spouse: Henrietta Roberta Hatter (1944-2003)

Andrew Fowler (February 23, 1910 - January 4, 2003) was a Baptist minister, educator, school administrator, counselor, political and religious adviser, church statesman and civil rights activist in Washington D.C.

== Early life and education ==
Andrew Fowler was born on February 23, 1910, in Inman, Spartanburg County, South Carolina, the oldest of seven children born to John Calvin Fowler and Ina Nesbitt Fowler, both natives of Spartanburg. His father worked at various professions, including being a track man for the railroad. His mother was a homemaker and also worked as a domestic staff. Later in life, he spoke of his childhood as "a happy situation," as he had a close relationship with his parents. Both of his parents emphasized religion, requiring Sunday School and regular church attendance. His paternal grandmother, Ellen, whose mother had been enslaved, was an important influence in Fowler's life; she passed on stories of their family history during enslavement in the United States.

Fowler's first job was to assist a white farmer in putting down fertilizer for cotton, for which he was paid $0.75 per day. He picked cotton, berries, peaches, and peas when in season, crowning up. When he earned an early promotion to the fourth grade, his father removed him from school and insisted that he got a job and helped to support his family.

By the age of seven, Fowler realized that he wanted to become a preacher. At the age of 12, he was converted and baptized at his family's church in Inman, Zion Hill Baptist Church. Over the next several years, his religious life grew, and he held various positions within the church, including Sunday School teacher, Assistant Superintendent of the Sunday School, and president of the Baptist Young Peoples Union, and when he turned 18, he was ordained a deacon. During this time, he was under the tutelage of his childhood pastor Rev. W.M. Lipscomb, whom he described as "a great gospel preacher."

== Education ==
=== Tuskegee Institute ===
Fowler took and passed the senior class final examination test, allowing him to graduate. A short time later, the president of the bank in which he worked introduced him to Acie Thompson, who was acquainted with the president of Tuskegee Institute (now known as Tuskegee University), Dr. Robert Russa Moton. Thompson suggested that Fowler enroll at Tuskegee. Fowler took his advice and arrived at Tuskegee Institute in September 1929. During his time there, he met many members of the faculty, including Dr. Moton, George Washington Carver, and Benjamin O. Davis Sr. By his second year at Tuskegee, Fowler had made a name for himself around campus because of his academic achievements, and he remained committed to his religious life, singing hymns in both the morning and evening vespers Chapel services.

Fowler received his high school diploma in plumbing in 1933, graduating as the highest ranking male student academically. He entered college at Tuskegee in 1933, majoring in History and minoring in Sociology. He was mainly interested in history. This was during the Great Depression and he worked as a janitor during his studies. After eight years he graduated with a Bachelor of Science degree in May 1937.

=== Howard University ===
Fowler decided to move to Washington, D.C., to attend the Howard University School of Religion (now Howard University School of Divinity), as he planned to lead an African American congregation. He arrived in DC in August 1937, and stayed for the remainder of his life. With this period of transition, he became one of more than six million African Americans who came from the rural Southern United States to the urban Northeast, a movement that has come to be known and defined as the Great Migration.

In September, he commenced study at the School of Religion, where his teachers included Benjamin Elijah Mays, Dean of the School of Religion, and Howard Thurman, Dean of the Chapel. He graduated from Howard in June 1940 with a Bachelor of Divinity degree. While working on his degree, Dr. Mays secured him an apprenticeship at the historic Shiloh Baptist Church under the leadership of the Rev. Dr. Earl L. Harrison. In June 1943, Fowler earned his Master of Arts degree in Religious Education from Howard.

== Career ==
=== Pastor ===
==== Capital View Baptist Church ====
In August 1940, Fowler was ordained a Baptist preacher by his childhood pastor, Rev. Lipscomb at his home church in Inman, Zion Hill Baptist. In early March 1941, at the age of 31, he was unanimously elected the third pastor of the Capital View Baptist Church in Northeast, Washington, D.C., after the church's second pastor had accepted a chaplaincy in the army.

Within five years of his appointment, Fowler disbursed all of the church's debts, spearheaded the construction of a new $330,000 edifice, and led the church to contribute annually to denominational schools and affiliate with numerous local organizations, including the National Urban League, the Stoddard Baptist Nursing Home Association, the DC chapter of the Tuberculosis Association, the local branch of the NAACP, and the Mayor's Emergency Committee on Health. While initially elected to serve as pastor for one year, Fowler served Capital View for a total of 62 years until his death in 2003.

==== Washington Baptist Theological Seminary ====
While pastor of Capital View, Fowler developed a relationship with Rev. Dr. William H. Jernagin, then President of the District of Columbia Baptist Convention, founder of the Washington Baptist Theological Seminary, chair of the National Fraternal Council of Negro Churches (NFCNC), and a nationally recognized figure in religion and civil rights. After delivering a message at the Seminary's chapel service, Fowler became an instructor at the school in 1947 teaching English and literature.

In May 1970, he was elected interim president of the school. As part of his role, he helped acquire the personal libraries of well-known African American Baptists and raise endowment funds. In 1976, he was formally named president of the seminary.

==== Divinity Degree ====
In 1960 Fowler was awarded an Honorary Doctor of Divinity Degree by the Lynchburg Seminary and College (now Virginia University of Lynchburg) for his outstanding work as a denomination leader, teacher, builder, civic leader, missionary, and pastor.

=== Politics ===
==== Civil Rights Leader ====
Upon the deaths of Dr. William Jernagin, and later Drs. J.L.S. Holloman and Earl L. Harrison, Fowler became the principal leader in organizing the clergy and laity in the District of Columbia. He committed himself to a number of social causes, particularly civil rights. He spent six years as Commissioner of D.C. General Hospital. As a member of the board of the National Fraternal Council of Negro Churches, director of its Washington Bureau, and Executive Secretary of the Committee of 100 Ministers, Fowler worked to support America's public schools, improve the social services system, lobbied to make jobs available to African Americans who could not be hired at federal agencies in D.C., such as the Bureau of Engraving and Printing, and advocated for the integration of the armed forces and public transportation in D.C.

==== D.C. Home Rule ====
In early 1974, a proposed D.C. Home Rule Act would have given the District an elected mayor and a 13-member city council. Several D.C. community leaders and home rule proponents denounced the legislation as a token effort, but Fowler and the Committee of 100 Ministers supported the act, taking the position that imperfect change was better than no change. Feeling that the citizens of the District needed to be educated regarding the Home Rule bill, and since the Committee of 100 represented over 25,000 people, he organized and conducted educational seminars aimed at turning out high numbers of “yes” votes. The act passed, and on January 2, 1975, the District's first elected officials took the oath of office. Walter E. Washington (a close friend of Fowler's) served one four-year term as elected mayor, and was succeeded by Marion Barry in 1979.

==== Presidential Adviser ====
Over the course of his political life, Fowler advised seven U.S. presidents (Franklin D. Roosevelt, Harry S. Truman, Dwight D. Eisenhower, John F. Kennedy, Lyndon B. Johnson, Richard Nixon, and Jimmy Carter), as well as mayors, and other political figures locally and nationally. He believed that morality could not be legislated, but that society should discipline itself. He opposed the D.C. City Council's attempts to legalize same-sex marriage, marijuana, and gambling. He felt the latter proposals would increase crime, "deteriorate character", and "dull the moral sense".

== Personal life ==
While serving his apprenticeship at Shiloh Baptist Church, he met one of the parishioners, Henrietta Roberta Hatter (June 16, 1913 - December 25, 2004).

Hatter was a native Washingtonian with roots in Stafford County, Virginia. She attended the public schools of the District of Columbia, graduating from Armstrong High School in 1931. After high school, she immediately began matriculation at the Miner Teachers College and earned her Bachelor of Science degree in Education in 1935. In the fall of 1937, she enrolled at Howard University and completed her work towards a Master of Arts degree in History in 1939. Shortly after earning her undergraduate degree, her teaching career began in Baltimore where she taught geography, and in 1950, she was hired by the District of Columbia Public School System as a full-time substitute teacher.

After a period of courting, Fowler and Hatter were married on June 27, 1944. Together they had four children: Andretta, Andrew H., Henrietta E., and John T.

In addition to her roles as wife and mother, Mrs. Fowler continued her career in education, and in 1968, she became a permanent faculty member at Woodrow Wilson High School teaching World History, Sociology, and American History, a position from which she retired in 1979. As First Lady of Capital View, she was also a volunteer at her husband's church.

== Death ==
Andrew Fowler died on January 4, 2003, at the age of 92. At the time of his death, he was one of the oldest and longest-serving pastors in the city and in the United States.
