= Vernon, Winston County, Mississippi =

Vernon
- Unincorporated community
- Vernon's position in Mississippi.
- Coordinates: 32°59′08″N 88°55′53″W
- Country: United States
- State: Mississippi
- County: Winston
- Elevation: 512 ft (156 m)
- Time zone: UTC-6 (Central (CST))
  - Summer (DST): UTC-5 (CDT)
- GNIS feature ID: 679207

Vernon is an unincorporated community in Winston County, Mississippi, United States. On April 27, 2011, a tornado hit 5 miles (8 km) southeast of Vernon as part of the 2011 Super Outbreak, damaging between 10 and 20 homes, knocking down numerous trees that blocked roads, and injuring seven people.
