= Louisville High School (Mississippi) =

Location
- 258 Ivy Ave. Louisville, Mississippi 39339; United States
- 33.1351°N 89.0518°W

Information
- Type: Public
- School district: Louisville Municipal School District
- Teaching staff: 35.42 (FTE)
- Grades: 9–12
- Enrollment: 502 (2023–2024)
- Student to teacher ratio: 14.17
- Color
- Mascot: Wildcat
- Website: www.louisvillehigh.com

Louisville High School (LHS) is a public secondary school in Louisville, Mississippi, United States. It hosts grades 9–12. Its mascot is the wildcat.

== Alumni ==
- Doug Cunningham – Professional football player
- Larry Estes – Professional football player
- Andy Kennedy – basketball player and coach
- Marcus Thames – baseball player and coach
