= Mashulaville, Mississippi =

Unincorporated community in Mississippi, US

Mashulaville
- Unincorporated community
- Location within the state of Mississippi
- Coordinates: 33°05′12″N 88°44′39″W
- Country: United States
- State: Mississippi
- County: Noxubee
- Elevation: 266 ft (81 m)
- Time zone: UTC-6 (Central (CST))
  - Summer (DST): UTC-5 (CDT)
- GNIS feature ID: 673218
- == Major highways ==: Mississippi Highway 490; Mississippi Highway 14 MS 14 is The East end Of MS 490; MS 490 Has an intersection with MS 397

Mashulaville is an unincorporated community in Noxubee County, Mississippi, United States.

== History ==
Mashulaville was named for Mushulatubbee, chief of the Choctaw.

The community is located on Hashuqua Creek and in 1900 had a population of 125. It was once home to three churches, two stores, a saw mill, and cotton gin.

A post office operated under the name Mashulaville from 1838 to 1960.

In the 1960s, Mennonites settled in Mashulaville after founding a mission to the Choctaw. The Mennonites operate the Mashulaville Dormitory, which is housed in the former Noxubee County Agricultural High School. The dormitory provides housing for mission work and serves as a location for community programs.

The Mashulaville Baptist Church is one of the oldest Baptist church structures in Mississippi.

The Treaty of Dancing Rabbit Creek was signed near Mashulaville.

== Notable people ==
- William Jernagin, an African-American civil rights activist, was born at Mashulaville in 1869.
