= Louisville, Mississippi =

Town in Winston County

- City
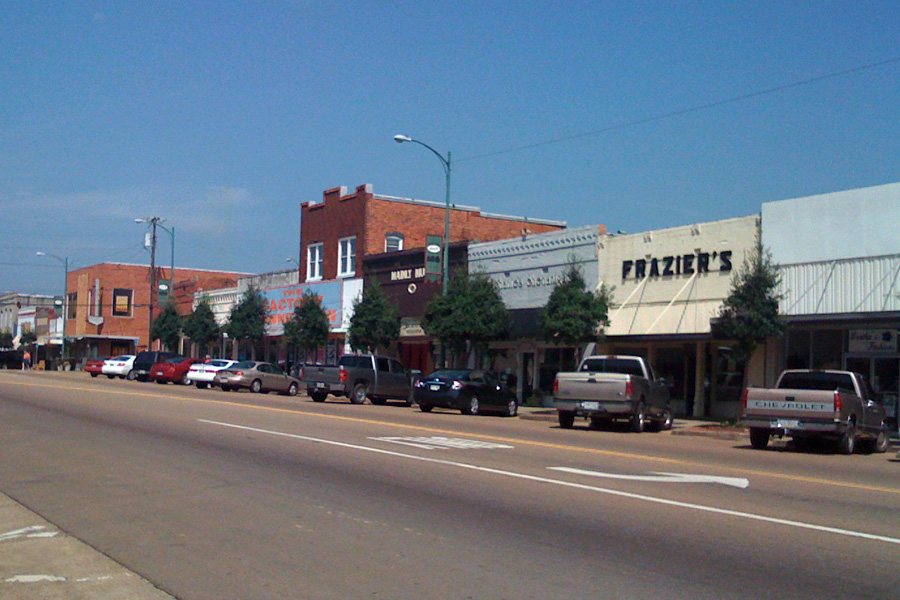
- Main Street in Louisville, 2008

- Flag Logo

- Location of Louisville, Mississippi

- Location in the United States
- Coordinates: 33°7′23″N 89°3′22″W
- Country: United States
- State: Mississippi
- County: Winston

Government
  - Mayor: William A. Hill (D)

Area
  - Total: 15.27 sq mi (39.56 km^{2})
  - Land: 15.10 sq mi (39.10 km^{2})
  - Water: 0.18 sq mi (0.46 km^{2})
- Elevation: 571 ft (174 m)

Population (2020)
  - Total: 6,072
  - Density: 402.2/sq mi (155.28/km^{2})
- Time zone: UTC-6 (Central (CST))
  - Summer (DST): UTC-5 (CDT)
- ZIP code: 39339
- Area code: 662
- FIPS code: 28-42280
- GNIS feature ID: 0693835
- Website: City Website

Louisville (pronounced LEW-iss-vill) is a city in and the county seat of Winston County, Mississippi. The population was 6,072 at the 2020 census.

== History ==
Like Winston County, Louisville is named for Louis Winston (1784–1824), a colonel in the militia, a prominent lawyer, and a judge of the Mississippi Supreme Court. In 1863 Union Colonel Benjamin Grierson marched 900 troops through Louisville during his raid through Mississippi. There was no fighting in Winston County.

In 1927, a mob of 1,000 white men from Louisville, lynched two African-Americans, Jim and Mark Fox by wrapping them in barbed wire and setting them on fire. The Foxes were accused of killing Clarence Nichols, a white man who started a fight with them because they would not let him pass their Ford touring car in his Chevrolet.

On April 28, 2014, Louisville was hit by an EF4 tornado, resulting in ten fatalities.

== Geography ==
Louisville is located at 33°7′23″N 89°3′22″W (33.122931, -89.056182). According to the United States Census Bureau, the city has a total area of 15.3 square miles (40 km^{2}), of which 15.1 square miles (39 km^{2}) is land and 0.2 square miles (0.52 km^{2}) (1.44%) is water. It is known by many as the "Front porch of the South".

=== Climate ===
Louisville has a humid subtropical climate (Köppen Cfa) with long, hot summers and short, mild winters.

Climate data for Louisville, Mississippi (1991–2020 normals, extremes 1891–2020)
Month	Jan	Feb	Mar	Apr	May	Jun	Jul	Aug	Sep	Oct	Nov	Dec	Year
Record high °F (°C)	84 (29)	87 (31)	92 (33)	92 (33)	101 (38)	105 (41)	107 (42)	107 (42)	106 (41)	97 (36)	88 (31)	83 (28)	107 (42)
Mean maximum °F (°C)	72.1 (22.3)	76.1 (24.5)	82.3 (27.9)	85.7 (29.8)	90.8 (32.7)	95.1 (35.1)	97.2 (36.2)	97.5 (36.4)	93.7 (34.3)	88.0 (31.1)	78.5 (25.8)	72.8 (22.7)	97.7 (36.5)
Mean daily maximum °F (°C)	55.0 (12.8)	58.9 (14.9)	67.8 (19.9)	75.0 (23.9)	82.5 (28.1)	89.0 (31.7)	91.5 (33.1)	91.0 (32.8)	86.2 (30.1)	76.5 (24.7)	64.8 (18.2)	56.8 (13.8)	74.6 (23.7)
Daily mean °F (°C)	44.4 (6.9)	48.0 (8.9)	55.7 (13.2)	63.0 (17.2)	71.4 (21.9)	78.2 (25.7)	81.0 (27.2)	80.5 (26.9)	75.2 (24.0)	64.5 (18.1)	53.5 (11.9)	46.5 (8.1)	63.5 (17.5)
Mean daily minimum °F (°C)	33.9 (1.1)	37.1 (2.8)	43.6 (6.4)	50.9 (10.5)	60.4 (15.8)	67.4 (19.7)	70.6 (21.4)	70.0 (21.1)	64.1 (17.8)	52.6 (11.4)	42.2 (5.7)	36.2 (2.3)	52.4 (11.3)
Mean minimum °F (°C)	15.7 (−9.1)	20.0 (−6.7)	25.7 (−3.5)	34.7 (1.5)	44.8 (7.1)	57.4 (14.1)	63.2 (17.3)	62.6 (17.0)	49.8 (9.9)	36.1 (2.3)	26.7 (−2.9)	20.7 (−6.3)	14.1 (−9.9)
Record low °F (°C)	−6 (−21)	−13 (−25)	12 (−11)	26 (−3)	37 (3)	43 (6)	52 (11)	46 (8)	37 (3)	24 (−4)	10 (−12)	−3 (−19)	−13 (−25)
Average precipitation inches (mm)	5.05 (128)	5.68 (144)	5.47 (139)	5.31 (135)	4.96 (126)	3.95 (100)	4.62 (117)	4.76 (121)	4.05 (103)	4.21 (107)	4.21 (107)	5.24 (133)	57.51 (1,460)
Average precipitation days (≥ 0.01 in)	8.8	8.6	8.8	7.4	8.7	8.1	10.0	8.9	5.5	5.9	7.3	8.9	96.9
Source: NOAAIEM

== Demographics ==
Historical population
Census	Pop.	Note	%±
1870	385		—
1880	418		8.6%
1890	484		15.8%
1900	505		4.3%
1910	1,181		133.9%
1920	1,777		50.5%
1930	3,013		69.6%
1940	3,451		14.5%
1950	5,282		53.1%
1960	5,066		−4.1%
1970	6,626		30.8%
1980	7,323		10.5%
1990	7,169		−2.1%
2000	7,006		−2.3%
2010	6,631		−5.4%
2020	6,072		−8.4%
U.S. Decennial Census

=== 2020 census ===
As of the 2020 census, Louisville had a population of 6,072. The median age was 38.8 years. 26.7% of residents were under the age of 18 and 19.8% of residents were 65 years of age or older. For every 100 females there were 82.5 males, and for every 100 females age 18 and over there were 75.5 males age 18 and over.

0.0% of residents lived in urban areas, while 100.0% lived in rural areas.

There were 2,377 households in Louisville and 1,589 families. Of all households, 36.0% had children under the age of 18 living in them, 31.7% were married-couple households, 17.0% were households with a male householder and no spouse or partner present, and 45.4% were households with a female householder and no spouse or partner present. About 30.8% of all households were made up of individuals and 14.3% had someone living alone who was 65 years of age or older.

There were 2,645 housing units, of which 10.1% were vacant. The homeowner vacancy rate was 4.1% and the rental vacancy rate was 6.3%.

Racial composition as of the 2020 census
Race	Number	Percent
White	1,929	31.8%
Black or African American	3,928	64.7%
American Indian and Alaska Native	20	0.3%
Asian	28	0.5%
Native Hawaiian and Other Pacific Islander	1	0.0%
Some other race	52	0.9%
Two or more races	114	1.9%
Hispanic or Latino (of any race)	96	1.6%

=== 2000 census ===
As of the census of 2000, there were 7,006 people, 2,641 households, and 1,817 families living in the city. The population density was 464.5 inhabitants per square mile (179.3/km^{2}). There were 2,884 housing units at an average density of 191.2 per square mile (73.8/km^{2}). The racial makeup of the city was 46.29% White, 52.46% African American, 0.13% Native American, 0.17% Asian, 0.44% from other races, and 0.51% from two or more races. Hispanic or Latino of any race were 1.66% of the population.

There were 2,641 households, out of which 34.3% had children under the age of 18 living with them, 40.4% were married couples living together, 25.0% had a female householder with no husband present, and 31.2% were non-families. 28.2% of all households were made up of individuals, and 14.4% had someone living alone who was 65 years of age or older. The average household size was 2.55 and the average family size was 3.12.

In the city, the population was spread out, with 28.9% under the age of 18, 9.3% from 18 to 24, 24.7% from 25 to 44, 19.8% from 45 to 64, and 17.3% who were 65 years of age or older. The median age was 35 years. For every 100 females, there were 80.6 males. For every 100 females age 18 and over, there were 73.8 males.

The median income for a household in the city was $27,485, and the median income for a family was $31,750. Males had a median income of $29,951 versus $17,491 for females. The per capita income for the city was $15,857. About 24.8% of families and 28.5% of the population were below the poverty line, including 39.3% of those under age 18 and 20.9% of those age 65 or over.

== Education ==
There is one school district in the entire county, the Louisville Municipal School District.

Prior to 1970, Louisville maintained a dual system of schools for White and Black students. Black students were educated at the Louisville Colored School, also known as Camile Street School, whereas White students had their own schools, including Louisville High School. Several federal laws and U.S. Supreme Court decisions forced this to change. In 1967, due to the Civil Rights Act of 1964, the school adopted a desegregation plan that in theory allowed students to choose which schools to attend. When the courts mandated that the schools be integrated, students from Louisville Colored School were allowed to attend Louisville High School. In order to preserve a segregated education for White students only, a segregation academy, Winston Academy was created. The City of Louisville is now served by the Louisville Municipal School District and Louisville High School. Private schools in Louisville include Winston Academy, which as of 2020 was still over 99% white, and Grace Christian School.

East Central Community College is the community college of Winston County.

== Culture ==
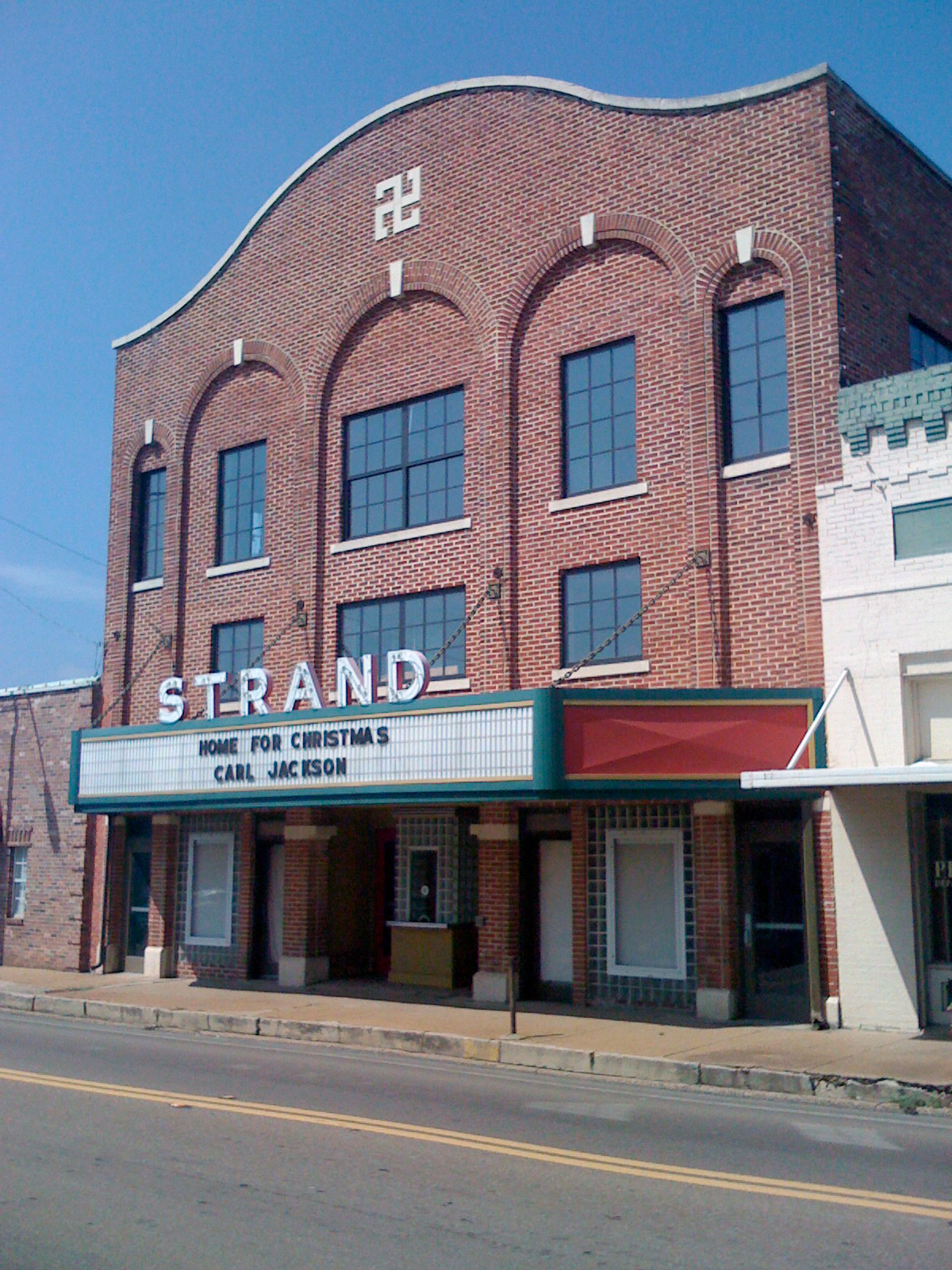
The historic Strand Theatre in downtown Louisville; note that the Swastika incorporated into the building's facade is decorative rather than political, as the theatre antedates the Nazi era.

The American Heritage "Big Red" Fire Museum is located in Louisville. This museum features a collection of restored antique fire equipment and fire engines. The Strand Theatre, in downtown Louisville, is an historic movie theater which now serves as an art and music venue. Louisville native Carl Jackson plays an annual Christmas concert at the theater to raise money for the building's restoration.

== Transportation ==
Mississippi Highway 14 enters east from the Alabama state line through Macon and when it enters in Louisville it is also known as Main Street. It leaves westbound eventually traveling to the Mississippi River where it ends.

Mississippi Highway 15 enters from the north from Ackerman, MS, then meets up with Mississippi Highway 25 just north of Louisville. M.S. 25 enters from the north from Starkville. M.S. 15 and 25 travel together along the western side of town. At the southern edge of town they separate: M.S. 15 traveling to Philadelphia & Interstate 20; and M.S. 25 to Jackson.

== Notable people ==
- Van Chancellor, basketball coach
- Thomas D. Clark, noted historian
- Doug Cunningham, former professional football player
- Olu Dara (born Charles Jones), jazz musician, father of the rapper Nas
- Drew Eubanks, American basketball player
- Mark Hudspeth, football coach
- Carl Jackson, country music songwriter
- E. Grady Jolly, U.S. circuit judge
- Andy Kennedy, basketball coach
- Coby Miller, Olympic athlete
- Matthew Mitchell, basketball coach
- Russ Nowell, politician
- Kim Rosamond, basketball coach for Tennessee Tech Golden Eagles
- Lisa Stewart, country music singer and TV host
- Marcus Thames, Major League Baseball player and coach
- Taylor McNeel, United States District Judge
