= Mississippi Highway 495 =

State highway in Mississippi

Mississippi Highway 495

Route information
- Maintained by MDOT
- Length: 33.859 mi (54.491 km)
- Existed: 1957–present

Major junctions
- South end: MS 493 in Bailey
- MS 16 near Moscow
- North end: MS 397 near Preston

Location
- Country: United States
- State: Mississippi
- Counties: Lauderdale, Kemper

Highway system
- Mississippi State Highway System; Interstate; US; State
← MS 494	→ MS 496

Mississippi Highway 495 (MS 495) is a state highway in eastern Mississippi running just under 34 miles (55 km) in length. Traveling through northern Lauderdale County and western Kemper County, it was created in 1957 and has remained on its original alignment since then.

== Route description ==
MS 495 begins at the settlement of Bailey at a T-intersection with MS 493. The two-lane road briefly heads west before turning to the north. It passes small housing developments, individual houses, and churches as it heads through rural northwestern Lauderdale County. At Center Hill, MS 495 passes Center Hill Martin Road which provides access to Okatibbee Dam and its associated park and lake, a gas station, and West Lauderdale Elementary School. As the road crosses into Kemper County, it heads to a more forested area passing fewer houses and settlements. About 14 miles (23 km) after crossing the county line, MS 495 reaches MS 16 at a T-intersection. MS 16 and MS 495 form a concurrency to the west for about one-half mile (0.80 km). MS 495 breaks off the concurrency to head north again through wooded areas but with some farm fields present along the road. It passes to the west of Joe Williams Field, an auxiliary air field of Naval Air Station Meridian and makes sharper curves through this area. It eventually curves more to the northeast to end at MS 397 south of the community of Preston.

== History ==
MS 495 was created in 1957 running along the alignment it runs today to the west of MS 493. It had originally been constructed as an unimproved road, it was not fully paved until 1974.

== Major intersections ==
County	Location	mi	km	Destinations	Notes
Lauderdale	Bailey	0.000	0.000	MS 493	Southern terminus
Kemper		23.189	37.319	MS 16 east – De Kalb	Southern end of MS 16 concurrency
Kemper		23.676	38.103	MS 16 west / Little Rock Road – Philadelphia	Northern end of MS 16 concurrency
Kemper		33.859	54.491	MS 397 / Nell Burnett Road	Northern terminus
1.000 mi = 1.609 km; 1.000 km = 0.621 mi: Concurrency terminus
