= Possumneck, Mississippi =

- Unincorporated community
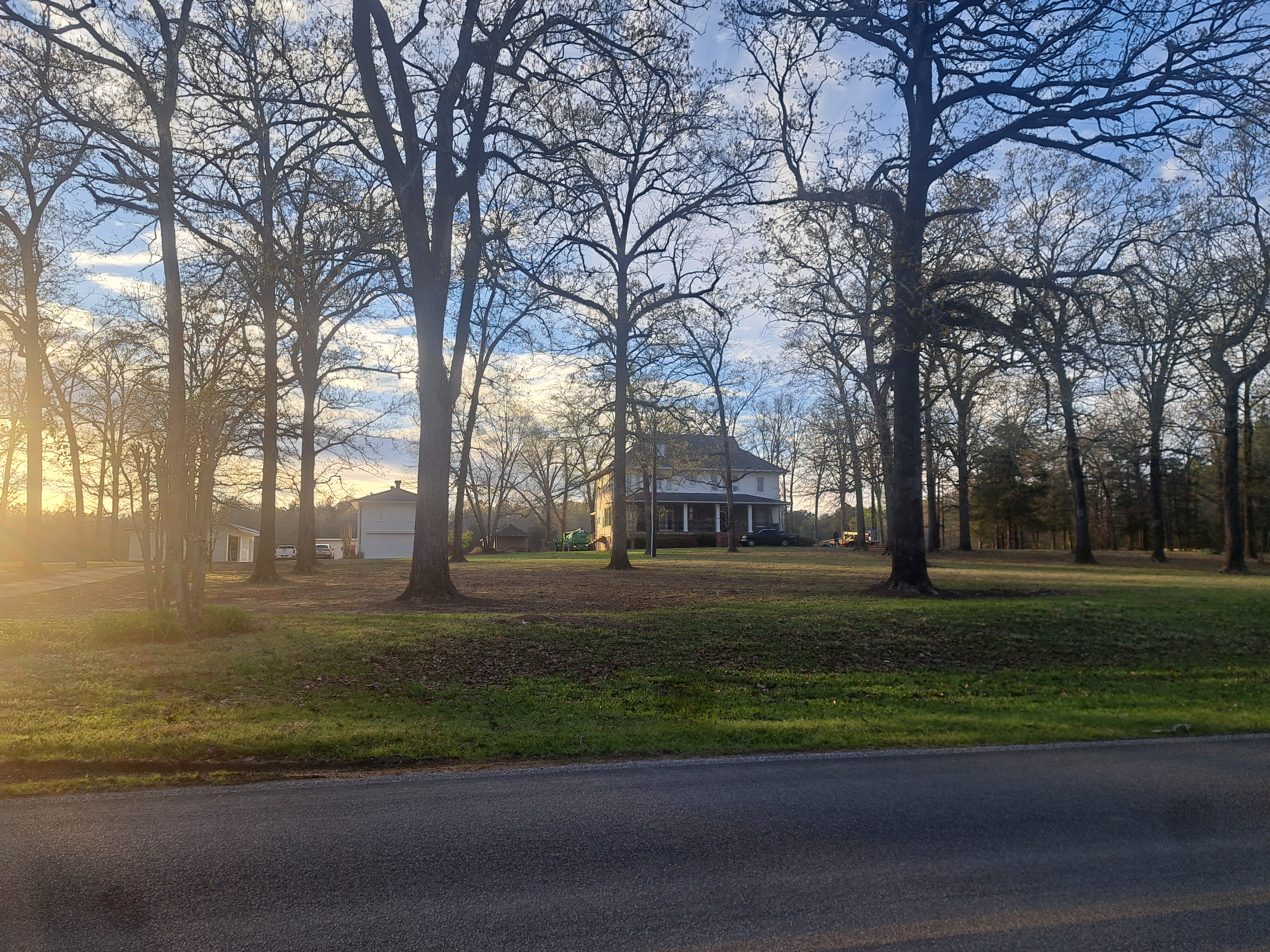
- One of the many rural homes in Possumneck

- Location within Mississippi Location within the United States
- Coordinates: 33°8′28.46″N 89°44′30.30″W
- Country: United States
- State: Mississippi
- County: Attala
- Elevation: 325 ft (99 m)
- Time zone: UTC-6 (Central (CST))
  - Summer (DST): UTC-5 (CDT)
- ZIP code: 39192
- Area code: 662
- GNIS feature ID: 676272

Possumneck is an unincorporated community located in Attala County, Mississippi, United States, along Mississippi Highway 19 and is approximately 4.3 miles (6.9 km) south-southeast of West.

== History ==
Possumneck is on land that once belonged to the Choctaws until the Treaty of Dancing Rabbit Creek. Settlers arrived in the 1830s from Alabama, Georgia, and Tennessee. The community was once known as "The Neck", as it is located on a neck of land between Sharkey Creek and the Big Black River. A local historian recounted that the name "Possumneck" was derived from a joke about all of the possums that lived in "The Neck", which caused its inhabitants to then refer to the community as Possumneck. J.A. Weeks, who was the first postmaster of Possumneck, reportedly built the first private airport in the state of Mississippi in Possumneck.

In 1900, Possumneck had a population of 48. The community once had one of the largest sawmills and cotton gins in Attala County.

A post office operated under the name Possumneck from 1893 to 1905.
