= Hesterville, Mississippi =

Hesterville
- Unincorporated community
- Hesterville's position in Mississippi.
- Coordinates: 33°09′38″N 89°39′15″W
- Country: United States
- State: Mississippi
- County: Attala
- Elevation: 440 ft (130 m)
- Time zone: UTC-6 (Central (CST))
  - Summer (DST): UTC-5 (CDT)
- GNIS feature ID: 671142

Hesterville (alternate names include Ayers Shop, Cedar Grove, and Palmers Springs) is an unincorporated community in Attala County, Mississippi, United States. A post office operated under the name Hesterville from 1881 to 1923. On April 27, 2011, a tornado reportedly hit the Hesterville area along the Mississippi State Highway 19 corridor as part of the 2011 Super Outbreak, downing numerous trees and rolling some trailers onto County Road 3031.
