= Valena, Mississippi =

- Ghost town
- Location within the state of Mississippi Valena, Mississippi (the United States)
- Coordinates: 32°57′15″N 89°53′00″W
- Country: United States
- State: Mississippi
- County: Attala
- Elevation: 230 ft (70 m)
- Time zone: UTC-6 (Central (CST))
  - Summer (DST): UTC-5 (CDT)
- GNIS feature ID: 711031

Valena is a ghost town in Attala County, Mississippi, United States.

The settlement was located approximately 2 mi (3.2 km) southeast of Goodman.

== History ==
Attala County was established in 1833, and Valena was one of its earliest settlements.

Valena was located on the east bank of the Big Black River, on the western part of a plantation owned by S.H. Clark.

The settlement prospered as a small trading center, and was a regular stopping point for flatboats on the river. The first sawmill in the county was located there, as well as a blacksmith shop, a saloon, two or three stores, and a post office from 1837 to 1840.

Valena was abandoned before 1900.
