= Little Apookta Creek =

Stream in Mississippi, U.S.

Coordinates: 33.1040177°N 89.6453564°W

Little Apookta Creek is a stream in the U.S. state of Mississippi. It is a tributary to Apookta Creek.

Apookta is a name derived from the Choctaw language meaning "doubled".
