= Mississippi Highway 16 =

State Highway in Mississippi

Mississippi Highway 16

Route information
- Maintained by MDOT
- Length: 186.4 mi (300.0 km) (166.472 mi excluding concurrencies)
- Existed: 1932–present

Major junctions
- West end: MS 1 in Grace
- US 61 in Rolling Fork; US 49 in Yazoo City; I-55 in Canton; US 51 in Canton; US 45 in Scooba
- East end: CR 30 to SR 17 at the Alabama state line near Giles

Location
- Country: United States
- State: Mississippi
- Counties: Issaquena, Sharkey, Yazoo, Humphreys, Madison, Leake, Neshoba, Kemper

Highway system
- Mississippi State Highway System; Interstate; US; State
← MS 15	→ MS 17

Mississippi Highway 16 (MS 16) is a state highway in central Mississippi. It runs east–west for 186.4 miles (300.0 km), from the Mississippi Delta region to the Alabama state line. MS 16 serves 8 counties: Issaquena, Sharkey, Yazoo, Humphreys, Madison, Leake, Neshoba, and Kemper.

== Route description ==
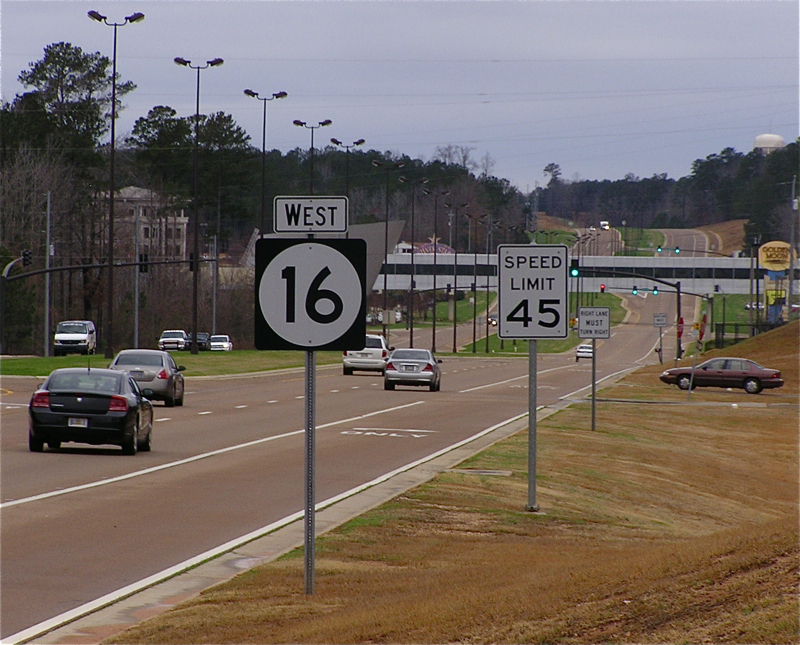
Mississippi Highway 16 westbound in Neshoba County.

MS 16 begins in the Mississippi Delta region in Issaquena County at an intersection with Grace Road in the community of Grace, not even a half mile from that road's intersection with MS 1 (Great River Road). It heads southeast as a two-lane highway through rural farmland for several miles to enter Sharkey County.

The highway now crosses Deer Creek before making a sharp right turn at an intersection with Rolling Fork Road to enter the Rolling Fork city limits, where state maintenance ends. Former MS 16 heads south enter town along Martin Luther King Jr. Street before turning left onto Rosenwald Avenue just north of downtown. Former MS 16 follows Rosenwald Avenue through some neighborhoods before it became concurrent (overlapped) US 61 south/MS 14 west. They headed south along a three-lane boulevard through a business district before state maintenance restarts on MS 16, with it splitting off along McLaurin Street. MS 16 leaves Rolling Fork as a two-lane and passes southeast through farmland for a few miles to enter the Delta National Forest. It travels southeastward through the northern part of for several miles before leaving the forest and crossing the Sunflower River into Holly Bluff and Yazoo County.

MS 16 passes straight through the center of the village, where it makes a sharp left turn at an intersection with Satartia Road (connector to MS 433), before leaving Holly Bluff and passing northeast through farmland (paralleling Silver Creek) for several miles to temporarily enter Humphreys County, where it crosses the creek and becomes concurrent with MS 149, before re-entering Yazoo County. MS 16/MS 149 pass southeast through a wooded area, where they cross the Will M. Whittington Auxiliary Channel, before re-entering farmland for several miles, where they cross Broad Lake. The highway now passes by Yazoo County Airport before crossing the Yazoo River to enter Yazoo City and immediately have an interchange with MS 3. MS 16/MS 149 pass east through both neighborhoods and the downtown area along Broadway Street to come to an intersection with US 49, where MS 149 ends and MS 16 continues east to climb some Loess hills out of the Mississippi Delta for several miles to pass through Benton, where it has an intersection with MS 433. The highway travels southeast through farmland for several miles to cross the Big Black River into Madison County.

MS 16 continues southeast to come to an interchange with I-55 (Exit 124), which it becomes concurrent with, and they head south as a four-lane freeway to enter Canton, which they mostly bypass along its west side as they have an interchange with MS 22 (Exit 119). MS 16 splits off at Exit 118 and heads east through the city's southern outskirts as a four-lane divided highway known as Nissan Parkway, where it has an intersection with US 51, and Canton Parkway, where it comes to an intersection with MS 43. MS 16 heads north along MS 43 as a two-lane through neighborhoods to an intersection with E Peace Street, where MS 16 splits off and heads east to leave Canton and pass through rural areas for the next several miles, where it has an intersection with MS 17 near Farmhaven, before entering Leake County.

MS 16 travels east through a wooded area to have an interchange with the Natchez Trace Parkway before crossing the Yockanookany River and passing through the community of Wiggins, where it has an interchange with MS 25. The highway now begins heading as it parallels the Pearl River to pass straight through downtown Carthage as a four-lane undivided highway, where it has an intersection with MS 35. MS 16 now narrows back to two-lanes as it leaves Carthage and travels through hillier terrain for the next several miles to the community of Edinburg, where it crosses the Pearl River and has an intersection with MS 427, before entering Neshoba County.

MS 16 travels southeast across the Mississippi Band of Choctaw Indians Reservation, where it passes through the community of Pearl River, as well as widens to a four-lane divided highway for several miles. The highway now enters the Philadelphia city limits, with it passing through a major business district as it has a short concurrency with MS 15, as well as starting two longer ones with MS 21 and MS 19. MS 16/MS 21/MS 19 have an intersection with unsigned MS 885 before splitting into a one-way pair between Main Street and Beacon Street to travel straight through the center of downtown, where they pass by the Neshoba County Courthouse before MS 21 splits off along Pecan Avenue. MS 19 splits off along Holland Avenue just shortly before Main Street and Beacon Street merge back together, and MS 16 heads east through neighborhoods as a four-lane undivided highway, where it has an intersection with MS 486, before leaving Philadelphia and heading east. MS 16 travels through rural areas for several miles, where it has intersections with MS 482 and MS 491, before crossing into Kemper County.

MS 16 travels eastward through remote woodlands for the next several miles, where it has a short concurrency with MS 495, as well an intersection with MS 397, prior to entering De Kalb. The highway passes through a business district before having a short concurrency with MS 39 as it bypasses downtown along its north side. MS 16 leaves De Kalb and travels through more remote woodlands (where it crosses the Sucarnoochee River) to enter Scooba. It passes by East Mississippi Community College before passing straight through town and coming to an intersection with US 45. MS 16 continues east to leave Scooba and travel through rural farmland for a few miles to come to the Alabama state line, where the road continues as Sumter County Road 30 (CR 30), a well maintained 2.9-mile-long (4.7 km) two-lane road that connects MS 16 with Alabama State Route 17 (SR 17).

== History ==
Until the 1990s, MS 16 was one continuous highway. The Martin Luther King Jr. Street and Rosenwald Avenue portions were turned over to the city of Rolling Fork, with the former concurrency with US 61/MS 14 being annulled at that time.

Until 2013 when the Canton Parkway was built, MS 16 did not bypass downtown Canton as it does today. It entered the area from the northwest along its current alignment to have an interchange with I-55 (Exit 124). The highway then followed Old Highway 16 to enter the city limits and become concurrent with US 51. MS 16/US 51 headed south along Liberty Street through neighborhoods to enter downtown, where MS 16 split off along E Peace Street at an intersection with MS 22 (W Peace Street). MS 16 headed east to leave downtown and pass through neighborhoods and a business district, where it had/has an intersection with MS 43 (Old Sharon Road). MS 16 then continued east along its current alignment toward Carthage.

== Major intersections ==
County	Location	mi	km	Destinations	Notes
Issaquena	Grace	0.0	0.0	Grace Road; To MS 1 – Mayersville, Greenville	Western terminus; leads only 0.4 mile west to MS 1
Sharkey	Rolling Fork	8.1	13.0	Rosenwald Avenue	East end of state maintenance
Sharkey	Rolling Fork	Gap in route			
Sharkey	Rolling Fork	9.2	14.8	US 61 / MS 14 – Vicksburg, Leland	
Yazoo	Holly Bluff	23.6	38.0	Sartaria Road - Lake George Wildlife Management Area	To MS 433
Yazoo		35.2	56.6	MS 149 north – Silver City	West end of MS 149 overlap
Yazoo	Yazoo City	46.2	74.4	MS 3 to US 49W – Greenwood, Vicksburg, trucks to US 49 / US 49W	interchange
Yazoo	Yazoo City	48.9	78.7	US 49 north – Greenwood, trucks to MS 149 north	Southern terminus of MS 149; west end of US 49 overlap
Yazoo		49.2	79.2	US 49 south – Jackson	East end of US 49 overlap
Yazoo		57.0	91.7	MS 433 – Benton, Bentonia, Benton Academy	
Madison		72.5	116.7	I-55 – Grenada	I-55 exit 124
Madison		76.6	123.3	US 51 north (Liberty Street)	West end of US 51 concurrency
Madison	Canton	77.6– 78.3	124.9– 126.0	MS 22 west (W Peace Street) – Canton, Flora	Eastern terminus of MS 22
Madison	Canton	80.6	129.7	US 51 south to Nissan Parkway west / I-55 – Jackson, Grenada	East end of US 51 overlap
Madison	Canton	83.4	134.2	MS 43 south – Sand Hill, Ross Barnett Reservoir	West end of MS 43 overlap
Madison	Canton	84.6	136.2	MS 43 north / East Peace Street – Sharon, Downtown Canton	East end of MS 43 overlap
Madison	Farmhaven	97.5	156.9	MS 17 north – Camden, Pickens	Southern terminus of MS 17
Leake		103.0– 103.4	165.8– 166.4	Natchez Trace Parkway	Interchange
Leake	Wiggins	107.9– 108.2	173.6– 174.1	MS 25 – Louisville, Jackson	Interchange
Leake	Carthage	113.9	183.3	MS 35 – Kosciusko, Forest, Walnut Grove	
Leake	Edinburg	126.9	204.2	MS 427 south – Madden	Northern terminus of MS 427
Neshoba	Philadelphia	138.1	222.3	MS 15 south / MS 21 south – Williamsville, Forest, Newton	West end of MS 15 / MS 21 overlap
Neshoba	Philadelphia	138.3	222.6	Cooper Williams Drive - Williamsville	
Neshoba	Philadelphia	138.9	223.5	MS 15 north / MS 19 north – Kosciusko, Louisville	East end of MS 15 overlap; west end of MS 19 overlap; no access from MS 15/MS 19 south to MS 16 east/MS 21 north; no access from MS 16 west/MS 21 south to MS 15/MS 19 north
Neshoba	Philadelphia	139.2	224.0	MS 885 north To MS 15 north / MS 19 north – Kosciusko, Louisville	Southern terminus of unsigned MS 885
Neshoba	Philadelphia	140.7	226.4	MS 21 north (Pecan Avenue)	East end of MS 21 overlap
Neshoba	Philadelphia	140.8	226.6	MS 19 south (Holland Avenue) – Meridian	East end of MS 19 overlap
Neshoba	Philadelphia	141.4	227.6	MS 486 east	Western terminus of MS 486
Neshoba	Philadelphia	142.0	228.5	Williamson Avenue	Proposed MS 894
Neshoba		144.4	232.4	MS 482 east	Western terminus of MS 482
Neshoba		145.7	234.5	Road 547	Proposed MS 853
Neshoba	Crossroads	150.2	241.7	MS 491 north	Southern terminus of MS 491
Kemper		155.8	250.7	MS 495 north	West end of MS 495 overlap
Kemper		156.3	251.5	MS 495 south	East end of MS 495 overlap
Kemper		157.9	254.1	Joe W. Williams Field	Proposed MS 493 north
Kemper		158.3	254.8	MS 493 south – Moscow, Meridian	Northern terminus of MS 493
Kemper		165.2	265.9	MS 397 north – Preston, Louisville, Lake Kemper County	Southern terminus of MS 397
Kemper	De Kalb	167.9	270.2	MS 39 north – Shuqualak	West end of MS 39 overlap
Kemper	De Kalb	168.1	270.5	MS 39 south (Main Avenue) – Downtown De Kalb, Meridian	East end of MS 39 overlap
Kemper	Scooba	180.2	290.0	US 45 – Macon, Meridian	
Kemper		186.4	300.0	CR 30 east to SR 17 – Geiger, Emelle	Eastern terminus; Alabama state line; runs only 2.9 miles east to SR 17
1.000 mi = 1.609 km; 1.000 km = 0.621 mi: Concurrency terminus; Incomplete access
