= Mississippi Highway 493 =

State highway in Mississippi

Mississippi Highway 493

Route information
- Maintained by MDOT and Kemper County
- Length: 35.135 mi (56.544 km)
- Existed: 1956–present

Major junctions
- South end: Poplar Springs Drive in Meridian
- MS 16 near Moscow
- North end: MS 397 in Lynville

Location
- Country: United States
- State: Mississippi
- Counties: Lauderdale, Kemper

Highway system
- Mississippi State Highway System; Interstate; US; State
← MS 492	→ MS 494

Mississippi Highway 493 (MS 493) is a state highway in eastern Mississippi for a length of 35 miles (56 km). It begins in the northernmost part of Meridian and travels through rural northern Lauderdale County and western Kemper County. The highway south of MS 16 is signed and maintained by the state while the portion north of it is unsigned and is maintained by Kemper County.

== Route description ==
MS 493 begins in the northern reaches of Meridian's city limits in the Poplar Springs neighborhood. The highway begins along Poplar Springs Drive on a curve where state maintenance begins along the road. Heading north, the highway first widens from two to four lanes in width, and passes through a commercial district passing numerous businesses and strip malls. As the road leaves the city limits, it narrows first to a two-lane road with a center turn lane, then to only two lanes. It heads into more rural surroundings with woods and farmlands. At the settlement of Bailey, MS 493 intersects MS 495 at the latter's southern terminus. MS 493 heads through numerous small settlements, each generally comprising houses and a few churches.

Continuing into Kemper County, MS 493 has similar surrounding as it did through northern Lauderdale County. It passes around the site of the Kemper Project power plant in southern Kemper County. It later heads through the settlement of Moscow, a relatively sparsely populated settlement with only some houses, farm facilities, and an eatery present. After passing an electric substation, the signed, state-maintained portion of MS 493 ends at a stop-controlled T-intersection with MS 16. Officially however, MS 493 resumes about 1/3 mile (0.54 km) to the east of here where it heads north along the county-maintained Lynville Road. The road passes along the edge of Joe Williams Field, an auxiliary air field of Naval Air Station Meridian. The two-lane road passes through a mix of farms and woods before ending in Lynville at MS 397.

== History ==
MS 493 was created in 1956 running generally along the alignment it runs today. A state maintained gravel road had existed from Meridian to MS 16 since 1951. This alignment had generally been maintained since then. Around 1974, the portion of the highway north of MS 16 had been removed from state maintenance. However, this segment remains formally part of MS 493 to today.

At its southern end, MS 493 formerly continued into downtown Meridian. It followed Poplar Springs Drive and 24th Avenue to end at 8th Street (which carried MS 19.

== Major intersections ==
County	Location	mi	km	Destinations	Notes
Lauderdale	Meridian	0.000	0.000	Poplar Springs Drive south	Southern terminus
Lauderdale	Bailey	4.838	7.786	MS 495 north	Southern terminus of MS 495
Kemper		27.213	43.795	MS 16 west – Philadelphia	Southern end of MS 16 concurrency; northern end of signed portion of MS 493
Kemper		27.541	44.323	MS 16 east – De Kalb	Northern end of MS 16 concurrency; to John C. Stennis Memorial Hospital
Kemper	Lynville	35.135	56.544	MS 397	Northern terminus
1.000 mi = 1.609 km; 1.000 km = 0.621 mi: Concurrency terminus
