= Mississippi Highway 496 =

State highway in Eastern Mississippi

Mississippi Highway 496
- MS 496 highlighted in red

Route information
- Maintained by MDOT
- Length: 13.198 mi (21.240 km)
- Existed: c. 1957–present

Major junctions
- West end: MS 19 near Meridian
- East end: CR 1 near Cuba, AL

Location
- Country: United States
- State: Mississippi
- Counties: Lauderdale

Highway system
- Mississippi State Highway System; Interstate; US; State
← MS 495	→ MS 498

Mississippi Highway 496 (MS 496) is a 13.2-mile-long (21.24 km) east–west state highway in eastern Mississippi. The route starts at MS 19 near Meridian and travels eastwards through rural Lauderdale County. The road crosses the Alabama–Mississippi state line east of Alamucha, and it continues on as a county highway. The road that became part of the route was constructed in the 1920s, and it was designated as a state highway by 1957. Two projects in 1964 and 1974 resulted in the route being fully paved.

== Route description ==
Traffic volume on Mississippi Highway 496
Location	Volume
East of Whitaker Road	1,100
East of Linton Road	430
East of Greenhill Road	230
West of Wire Road 1	150
Data was measured in 2019 in terms of AADT; Source: Mississippi Department of Transportation

All of MS 496 is located within Lauderdale County, and the route is maintained by the Mississippi Department of Transportation (MDOT) as part of the Mississippi State Highway System. MS 496 is legally defined in Mississippi Code § 65-3-3.

MS 496 starts at a three-way intersection with MS 19 near Meridian, and the route travels eastward through rural, forested Lauderdale County. The road begins to turn northeast past Old Wire Road and Whitaker Road, and it crosses Cokers Branch near Harper Road. At KOA Campground Road, MS 496 begins traveling southeastward. The route then intersects Russell–Mount Gilead Road and Linton Road, which travel to Russell and Vimville respectively. MS 496 enters the unincorporated area of Alamucha near Alamucha–Whynot Road, and starts traveling northeastwards again east of Greenhill Road. Near the Alabama–Mississippi state line, the road intersects T.K. Culpepper Road, a county-maintained state highway with the designation of MS 897. MS 496 crosses the state line past Salem Church Road, and it continues as Sumter County Route 1, which continues northeastwards towards the town of Cuba.

== History ==
The road that became part of MS 496 was built in the 1920s, following telegraph lines that were completed in 1849. By 1957, it became part of MS 496, starting at MS 19 near Meridian and ending at the Alabama state line. The route was paved in asphalt near the western terminus, and the remaining had a gravel surface. A project to pave and improve 3.9 miles (6.3 km) of MS 496 from Meridian to Alamucha began in 1964, and it was completed one year later. Another project to pave the route to the Alabama state line started in 1973, and it was completed by 1974, resulting in MS 496 being fully paved in asphalt though both termini.

== Major intersections ==
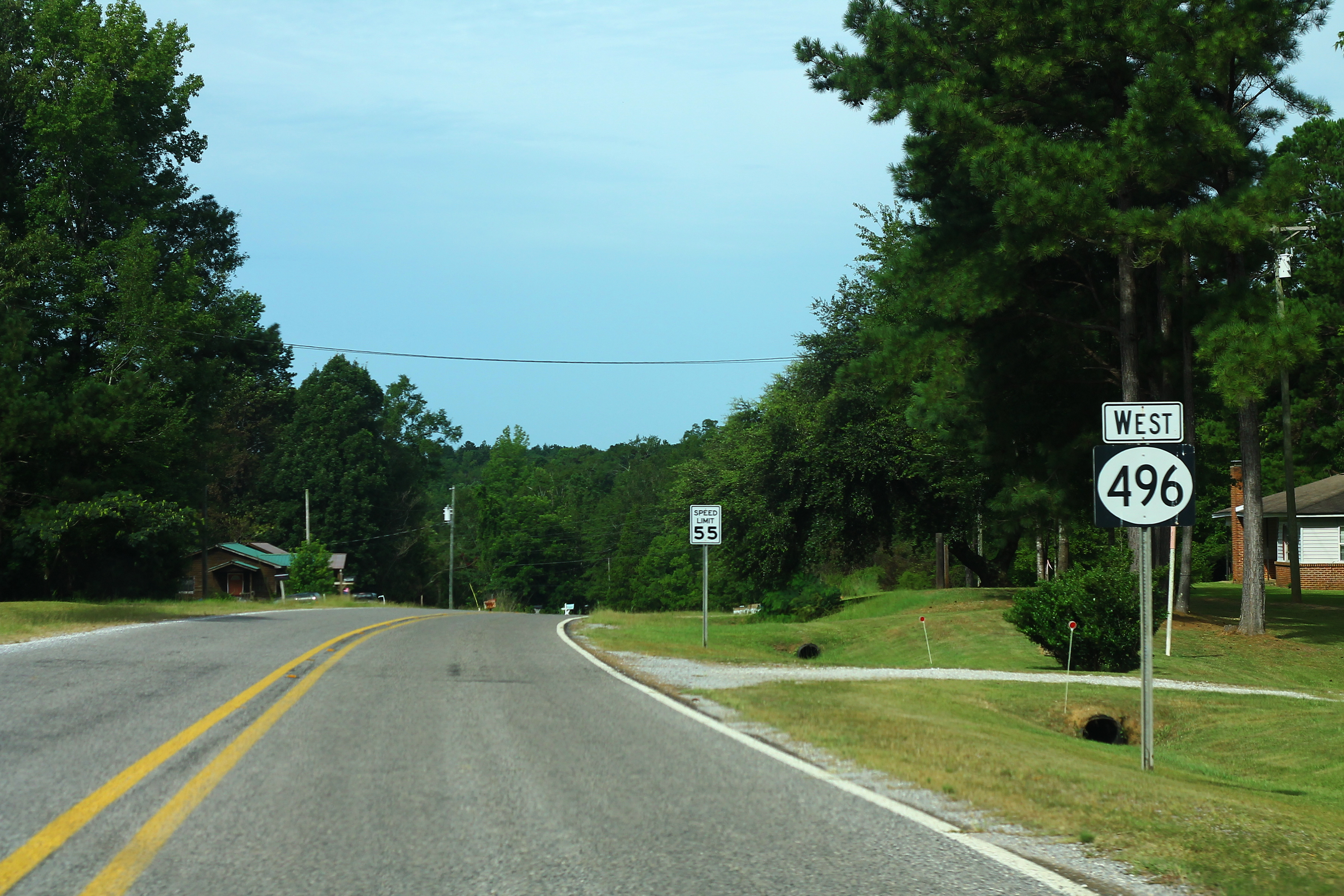
MS 496 in Lauderdale County, Mississippi

The entire route is in Lauderdale County.

Location	mi	km	Destinations	Notes
	0.0	0.0	MS 19 – Meridian, Butler, AL	Western terminus
	12.4	20.0	MS 897 (T.K. Culpepper Road)	Northern terminus of MS 897
	13.2	21.2	CR 1 (Wire Road 1)	Eastern terminus
1.000 mi = 1.609 km; 1.000 km = 0.621 mi
