= Apookta Creek =

Stream in Mississippi, U.S.

Coordinates: 33°06′58″N 89°48′15″W

Apookta Creek is a stream in the U.S. state of Mississippi. It is a tributary to the Big Black River.

Apookta is a name derived from the Choctaw language meaning "doubled". Variant names are "Apuchtah Creek" and "Opookta Creek".
