= Mississippi Highway 494 =

State highway in Mississippi

Mississippi Highway 494

Route information
- Maintained by MDOT
- Length: 22.723 mi (36.569 km)

Major junctions
- West end: MS 15 in Union
- East end: MS 19 near Nellieburg

Location
- Country: United States
- State: Mississippi
- Counties: Newton, Lauderdale

Highway system
- Mississippi State Highway System; Interstate; US; State
← MS 493	→ MS 495

Mississippi Highway 494 (MS 494) is a 22.7-mile-long (36.5 km) state highway connecting Union at MS 15 to MS 19 northwest of Meridian.

== Route description ==
MS 494 begins about one mile (1.6 km) southeast of downtown Union (but within the town limits) at the MS 15 bypass of the town. It heads southeast through a mix of open fields and woods passing some homes along the way. It passes through the community of Little Rock then generally heads more easterly passing to the north of Duffee. After entering Lauderdale County from Newton County, MS 494 begins to curve back towards the southeast. It enters the community of Schamberville and forms part of the border of the census designated place of Collinsville. Continuing southeast, it heads through Suqualena before ending at MS 19, about equidistant between Collinsville and Nellieburg and about six miles (9.7 km) northwest of Meridian.

== History ==
A state highway that followed MS 494 was first shown on state highway maps in 1951. The MS 494 appeared along the road by 1955 however references to it dated back to at least 1952. The only change to its routing was when MS 15 was moved to a bypass of Union in 1977, MS 494 was cut back to its current terminus from Old Decatur Road.

== Major intersections ==
County	Location	mi	km	Destinations	Notes
Newton	Union	0.000	0.000	MS 15 / Highway 494 – Newton, Philadelphia	Western terminus
Lauderdale		22.723	36.569	MS 19 – Philadelphia, Meridian	Eastern terminus
1.000 mi = 1.609 km; 1.000 km = 0.621 mi
