= Wiggins, Leake County, Mississippi =

- Unincorporated community
- Location within Mississippi Location within the United States
- Coordinates: 32°42′7.49″N 89°38′12.27″W
- Country: United States
- State: Mississippi
- County: Leake
- Elevation: 377 ft (115 m)
- Time zone: UTC-6 (Central (CST))
  - Summer (DST): UTC-5 (CDT)
- GNIS feature ID: 679670

Wiggins is an unincorporated community in Leake County, Mississippi.

Wiggins is located at 32°42′7.49″N 89°38′12.27″W, west of Carthage, near the intersection of Mississippi Highway 16 and Mississippi Highway 25.
