= Mississippi Highway 19 =

State Highway in Mississippi

Mississippi Highway 19

Route information
- Maintained by MDOT
- Length: 118.3 mi (190.4 km) (101.864 mi excluding concurrencies)
- Existed: 1932–present

Major junctions
- South end: SR 10 at the Alabama state line near Whynot
- US 45 in Meridian; I-20 / I-59 / US 11 / US 80 in Meridian; MS 15 / MS 16 / MS 21 in Philadelphia; MS 14 / MS 35 in Williamsville; MS 12 / MS 43 in Kosciusko
- North end: US 51 in West

Location
- Country: United States
- State: Mississippi
- Counties: Lauderdale, Newton, Neshoba, Winston, Attala, Holmes

Highway system
- Mississippi State Highway System; Interstate; US; State
← MS 18	→ I-20

Mississippi Highway 19 (MS 19) is a state highway in Mississippi. It runs for 118.3 miles (190.4 km), serving the counties of Lauderdale, Newton, Neshoba, Winston, Attala, and Holmes. The highway is actually part of a long multi-state route that goes through Alabama and Georgia.

== Route description ==
MS 19 begins in Lauderdale County at the Alabama state line, where it continues into that state as Alabama State Route 10 (SR 10). It heads northwest as a two-lane highway through wooded and hilly terrain for several miles, where it passes through the community of Whynot and has an intersection with MS 496, before widening to a four-lane divided highway as it enters the Meridian city limits. The highway heads east through suburbs to have an interchange with US 45, as well as an intersection with Jimmie Rodgers Parkway as it passes by Bonita Lakes Park, before entering a business and becoming concurrent (overlapped) with I-20/I-59/US 11/US 80 (Exit 154 A/B) at an intersection with MS 39. They head west to bypass downtown along its southern edge as a four-lane freeway, having interchanges with MS 145 and MS 493 (22nd Avenue; Exit 153), as well as 29th Avenue (Exit 152), and 49th Avenue (Exit 151). MS 19 splits off at Exit 150, with departing and heading south at the same exit, which lies just north of Meridian Regional Airport. The highway heads north as a four-lane undivided highway through a business district far a little over a mile before making a sharp left turn onto 8th Street and passing by Meridian Community College. MS 19 passes through neighborhoods, where it has an intersection with Old Highway 80 W, before turning northwest to leave Meridian and widen to a divided highway. It crosses over Okatibbee Creek before passing through the communities of Nellieburg, Hookston (where it has an intersection with MS 494), and Collinsville (where it briefly narrows to an undivided highway and passes by Okatibbee Lake and Dam). The highway now briefly enters the northeastern corner of Newton County, where it has an intersection with MS 491, before entering Neshoba County.

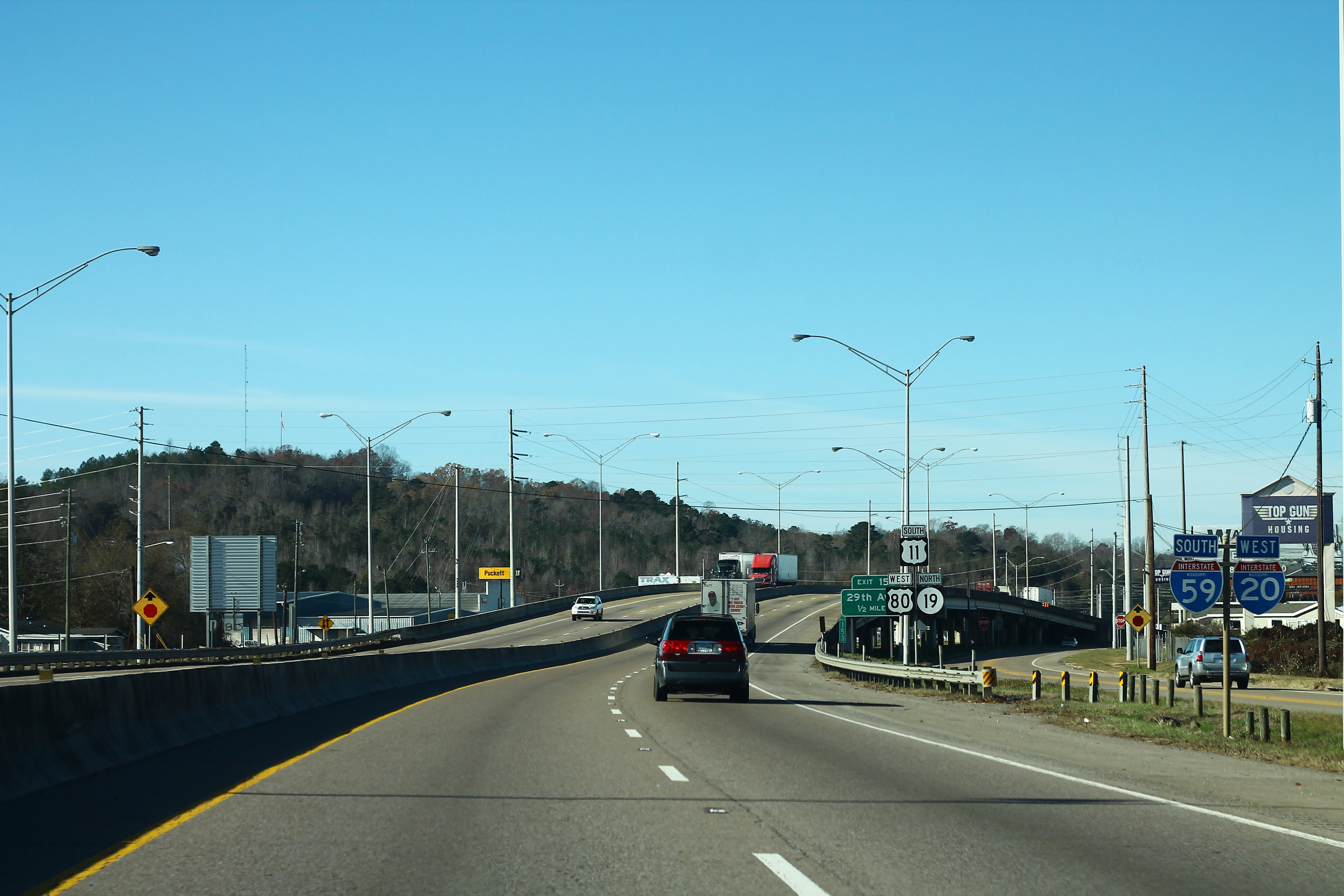
MS 19 along its concurrency (overlap) with I-20/I-59/US 11/US 80 in Meridian

MS 19 passes through the community of House, where it has an intersection with MS 492, before narrowing to two-lanes and traveling through a portion of the Mississippi Band of Choctaw Indians Reservation, where it passes through the community of Tucker. The highway now enters the Philadelphia city limits along Holland Avenue and immediately passes through a business district before passing through neighborhoods to become concurrent with MS 16, with the road heading west into downtown as a one-way pair between Main Street and Beacon Street. MS 16/MS 19 are almost immediately joined by MS 21 (Pecan Avenue) and the highway passes straight through the heart of town for several blocks. The highway now leaves downtown as Main Street and Beacon Street merge and they pass through a business district, where they have an intersection with unsigned MS 885 before MS 19 splits off and heads north along MS 15. MS 15/MS 19 head north through the outskirts of town along MS 15's two-lane bypass of the city, where they pass by Philadelphia Municipal Airport before MS 19 splits off at an interchange. MS 19 now leaves Philadelphia and travels through another portion of the Mississippi Band of Choctaw Indians Reservation, where it passes through the community of Choctaw and crosses the Pearl River, before curving to the northwest to have an intersection with MS 395 in Arlington and enter some hilly terrain as it briefly crosses into the southwestern-most corner of Winston County, where it has an interchange with MS 25.

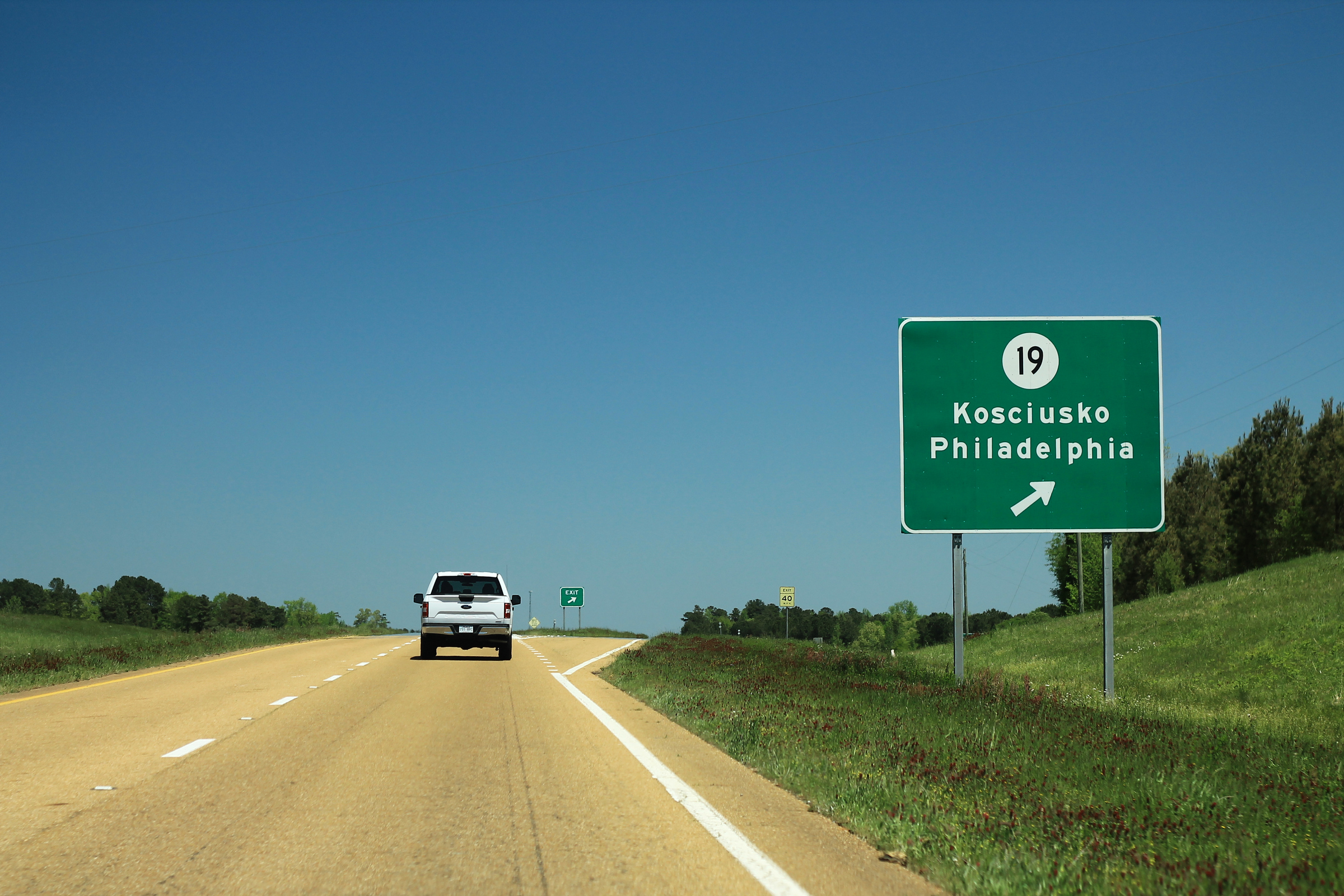
Sign for Mississippi Highway 19 along Mississippi Highway 25

MS 19 enters Attala County as it travels through hilly woodlands for the next several miles, where it becomes concurrent with MS 14, before entering the community of Williamsville, where they have an intersection with MS 736 before MS 19 splits from MS 14 and heads north along MS 35 to cross the Yockanookany River and enter Kosciusko at an interchange with the Natchez Trace Parkway. MS 19/MS 35 immediately have an intersection with MS 731 (S Huntington Street) before bypassing downtown along its west side (known as Veterans Memorial Drive), where it has an intersection with MS 735 (Old State Highway 12) before becoming concurrent with MS 12. MS 12/MS 19/MS 35 head west through business district on the north side of town as a four-lane undivided highway, where they become concurrent with MS 43 at another intersection with MS 731 (N Natchez Street). MS 19/MS 35 split off along N Jackson Street as a two-lane shortly thereafter, with MS 19 itself splitting off along Fenwick Street a little over an eighth mile later. MS 19 passes through neighborhoods before leaving Kosciusko and traveling mostly wooded areas for the next several miles, where it passes through the community of Possumneck and has an intersection with MS 440, before crossing the Big Black River into Holmes County.

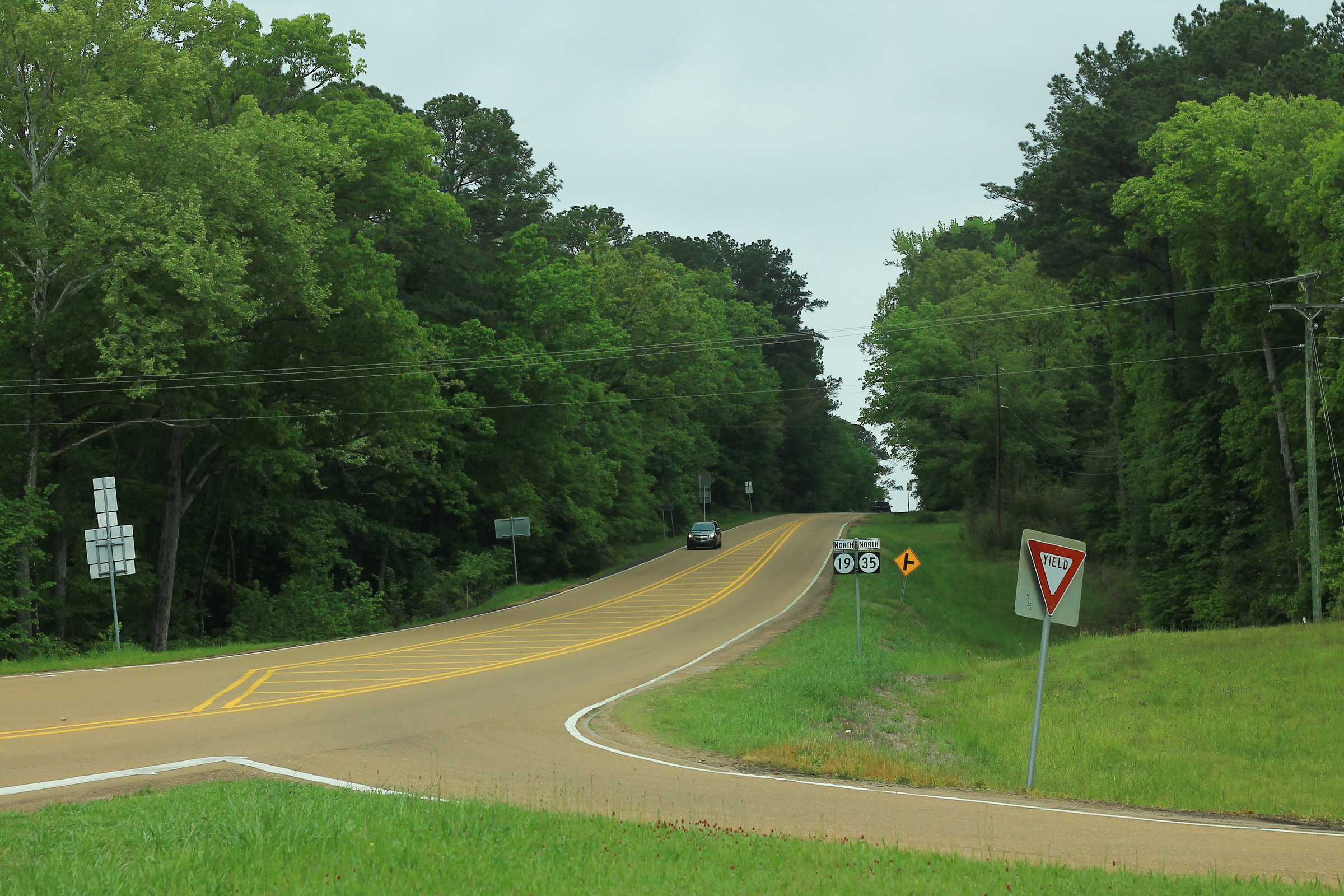
MS 19 at its junction with MS 14 and MS 35 in Williamsville

The highway immediately enters the town of West city limits and comes to an end near the center of town at an intersection US 51.

== Major intersections ==
County	Location	mi	km	Destinations	Notes
Lauderdale		0.0	0.0	SR 10 east – Lisman, Butler	Alabama state line; southern terminus
Lauderdale		13.2	21.2	MS 496 east – Rosser	Western terminus of MS 496
Lauderdale	Meridian	14.6– 14.9	23.5– 24.0	US 45 – Quitman, Macon	Interchange
Lauderdale	Meridian	15.8	25.4	To I-20 / I-59 / Jimmie Rodgers Parkway	
Lauderdale	Meridian	17.1	27.5	I-20 east / I-59 north – Tuscaloosa US 11 north / US 80 east (Frontage Road) / MS 39 north – De Kalb, Naval Air Station	South end of I-20 / I-59 / US 11 / US 80 overlap; MS 19 south follows exit 154A; southern terminus of MS 39
Lauderdale	Meridian	18.4– 18.7	29.6– 30.1	MS 145 south / MS 493 north (22nd Avenue) – Quitman	I-20/59 exit 153; northern terminus of MS 145; southern terminus of MS 493
Lauderdale	Meridian	19.5– 20.0	31.4– 32.2	29th Avenue	I-20/59 exit 152
Lauderdale	Meridian	20.4– 20.9	32.8– 33.6	49th Avenue	I-20/59 exit 151
Lauderdale	Meridian	21.3	34.3	I-20 west / I-59 south / US 80 west – Laurel, Jackson US 11 south – Meridian Airport	North end of I-20 / I-59 / US 11 / US 80 overlap; MS 19 north follows exit 150
Lauderdale	Hookston	28.7	46.2	MS 494 west – Suqualena, Union	Eastern terminus of MS 494
Lauderdale		30.6	49.2	Okatibbee Dam Road - Okatibbee Dam	Provides access to the dam
Lauderdale	Collinsville	32.9	52.9	Okatibbee Dam Road - Okatibbee Lake Park Areas	Provides access to lakeside park areas
Newton		42.0	67.6	MS 491 north	Southern terminus of MS 491
Neshoba	House	47.0	75.6	MS 492 – Union	
Neshoba	Philadelphia	59.3	95.4	MS 16 east (Main Street) – De Kalb	South end of MS 16 overlap
Neshoba	Philadelphia	59.4	95.6	MS 21 north (Pecan Avenue)	South end of MS 21 overlap
Neshoba	Philadelphia	61.0	98.2	MS 885 north To MS 15 north / MS 19 north – Louisville	Southern terminus of unsigned MS 885
Neshoba	Philadelphia	61.2	98.5	MS 15 south / MS 16 west / MS 21 south – Carthage, Newton	North end of MS 16 / MS 21 overlap; interchange; south end of MS 15 overlap; no access to northbound MS 15/MS 19; no access from southbound MS 15 to southbound MS 16/MS 19/MS 21
Neshoba	Philadelphia	64.5	103.8	MS 15 north – Noxapater, Louisville	North end of MS 15 overlap; interchange
Neshoba	Arlington	71.8	115.6	MS 395 north – Noxapater	Southern terminus of MS 395
Winston	Four Corners	80.2– 80.5	129.1– 129.6	MS 25 – Carthage, Jackson, Louisville, Starkville	Interchange
Attala		91.8	147.7	MS 14 east – Louisville	South end of MS 14 overlap
Attala	Williamsville	96.5	155.3	MS 736 west – Williamsville	Eastern terminus of MS 736
Attala	Williamsville	98.4	158.4	MS 14 west / MS 35 south – Goodman, Carthage	North end of MS 14 overlap; south end of MS 35 overlap
Attala		99.0	159.3	MS 736 east – Williamsville	Western terminus of MS 736
Attala		99.2– 99.5	159.6– 160.1	Natchez Trace Parkway	Interchange
Attala	Kosciusko	99.5	160.1	MS 731 north (S Huntington Street) – Downtown	Southern terminus of MS 731
Attala	Kosciusko	101.4	163.2	MS 735 (Old State Highway 12) – Downtown, Ethel	Former MS 12
Attala	Kosciusko	101.9	164.0	MS 12 east – Ackerman	South end of MS 12 overlap
Attala	Kosciusko	102.5	165.0	MS 43 north (North Natchez Street)	South end of MS 43 overlap
Attala	Kosciusko	102.6	165.1	MS 12 west / MS 43 south / North Jackson Street – Durant, Kosciusko	North end of MS 12 / MS 43 overlap
Attala	Kosciusko	102.7	165.3	MS 35 north – Vaiden	North end of MS 35 overlap
Attala		118.1	190.1	MS 440 east	Western terminus of MS 440
Holmes	West	118.3	190.4	US 51 – Durant, Vaiden	Northern terminus
1.000 mi = 1.609 km; 1.000 km = 0.621 mi: Concurrency terminus; Incomplete access
