= Williamsville, Mississippi =

- Unincorporated community
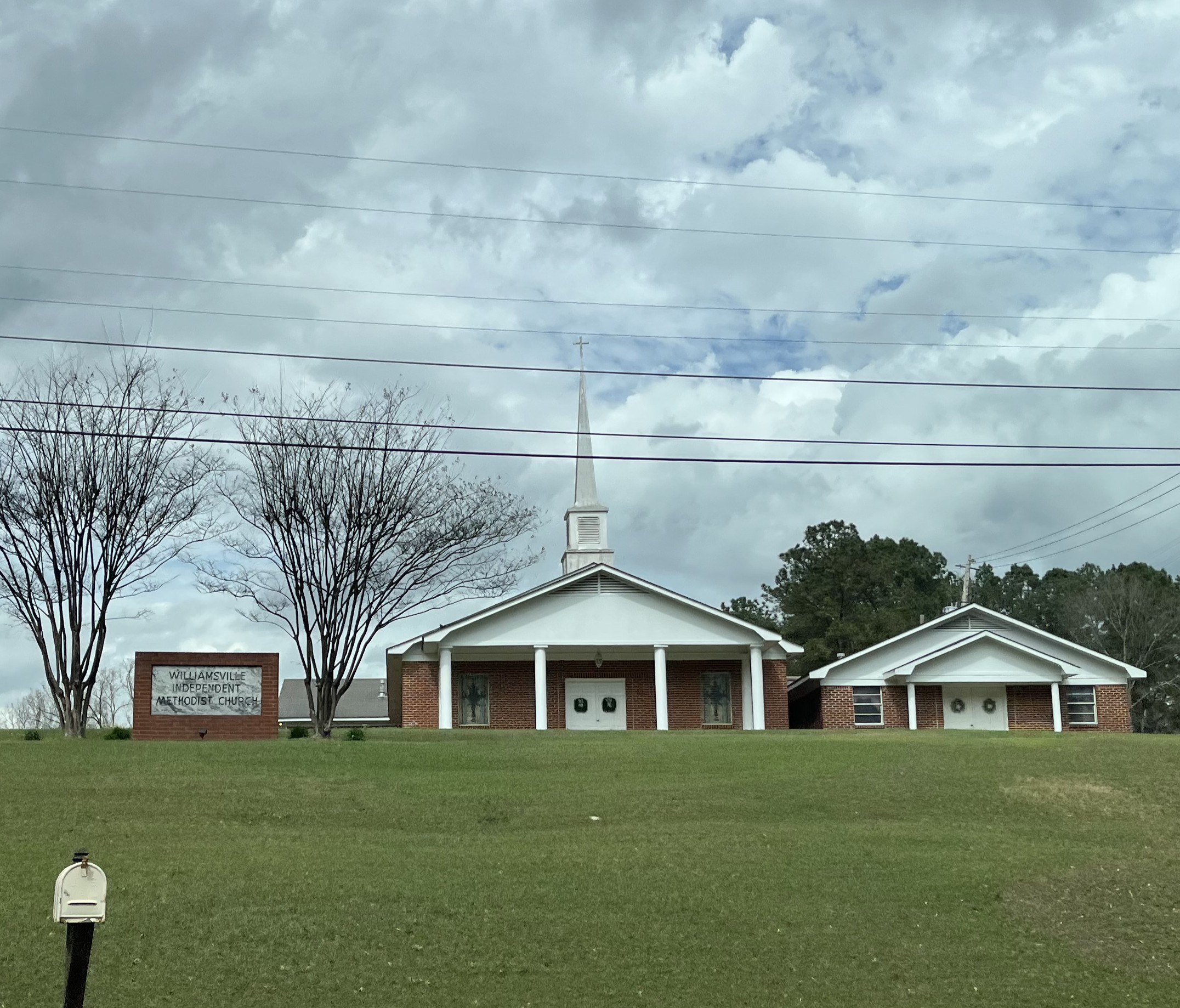
- Williamsville Independent Methodist Church

- Location within Mississippi Location within the United States
- Coordinates: 33°01′36″N 89°34′01″W
- Country: United States
- State: Mississippi
- County: Attala
- Elevation: 420 ft (128 m)
- Time zone: UTC-6 (Central (CST))
  - Summer (DST): UTC-5 (CDT)
- Area code: 662
- GNIS feature ID: 679727

Williamsville is an unincorporated community in Attala County, Mississippi, United States. Williamsville is located near Mississippi Highway 19 and is approximately 2.4 miles (3.9 km) southeast of Kosciusko.
