= Suqualena, Mississippi =

- Unincorporated community
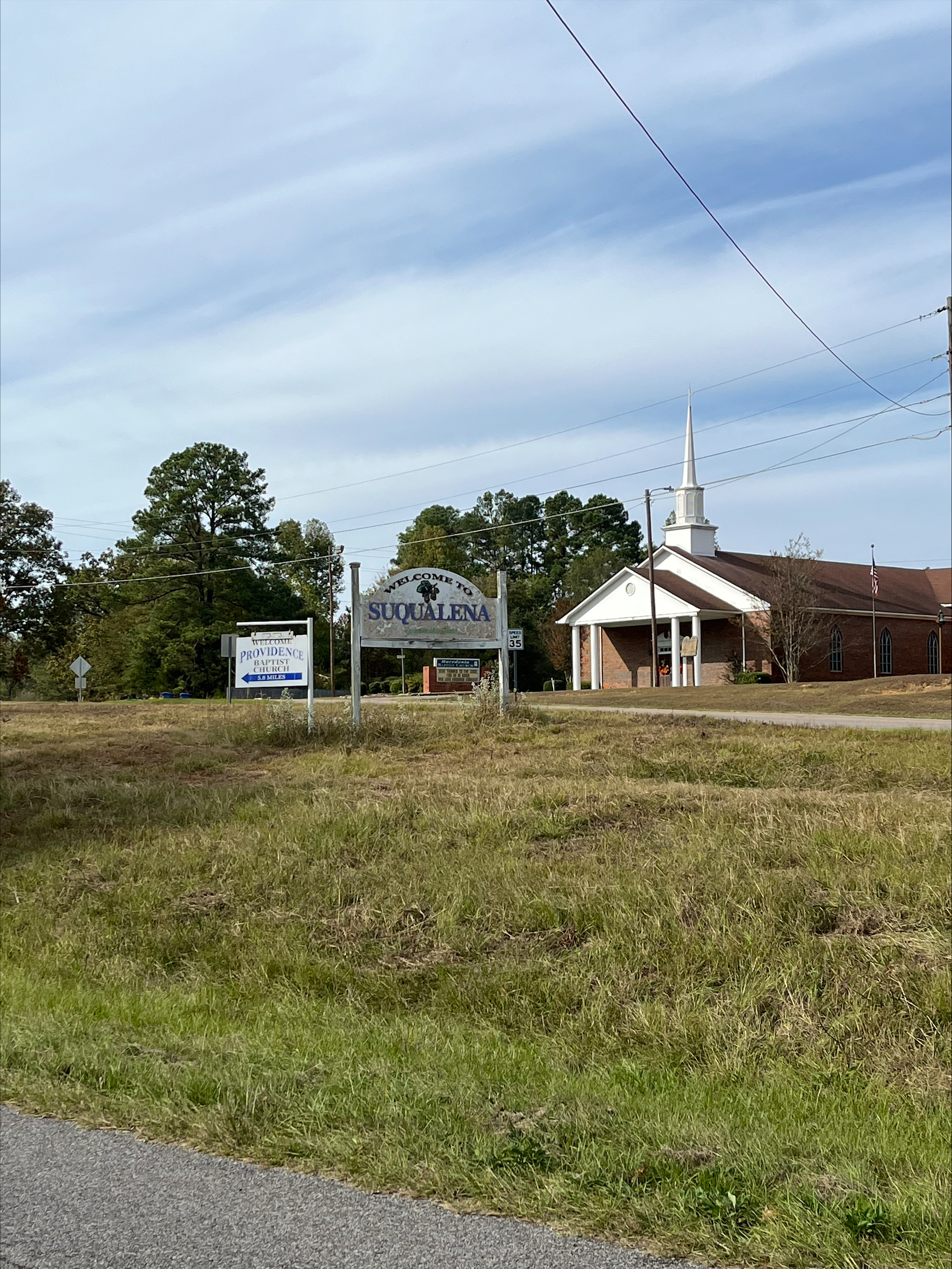
- Suqualena Welcome Sign

- Location within Mississippi Location within the United States
- Coordinates: 32°26′36″N 88°49′35″W
- Country: United States
- State: Mississippi
- County: Lauderdale
- Elevation: 397 ft (121 m)
- Time zone: UTC-6 (Central (CST))
  - Summer (DST): UTC-5 (CDT)
- Area code: 601
- GNIS feature ID: 678439

Suqualena, also spelled Sookalena, is an unincorporated community located in central Lauderdale County, Mississippi, United States, located approximately 9 miles (14 km) northwest of Meridian on Mississippi Highway 494 and is part of Meridian, Mississippi Micropolitan Statistical Area.

== History ==
Suqualena is named after Suqualena Creek, which is derived from the Choctaw language words meaning either "creek on whose banks are camps" or "poor hog". The community had a depot on the Meridian and Memphis Railway.

In 1921, Suqualena was served by a two-year school.

Suqualena was once home to a 675-acre plantation.

A post office operated under the name Sookalena from 1851 to 1860.

Suqualena is served by the Suqualena Volunteer Fire Department.
