= Bailey, Mississippi =

- Unincorporated community
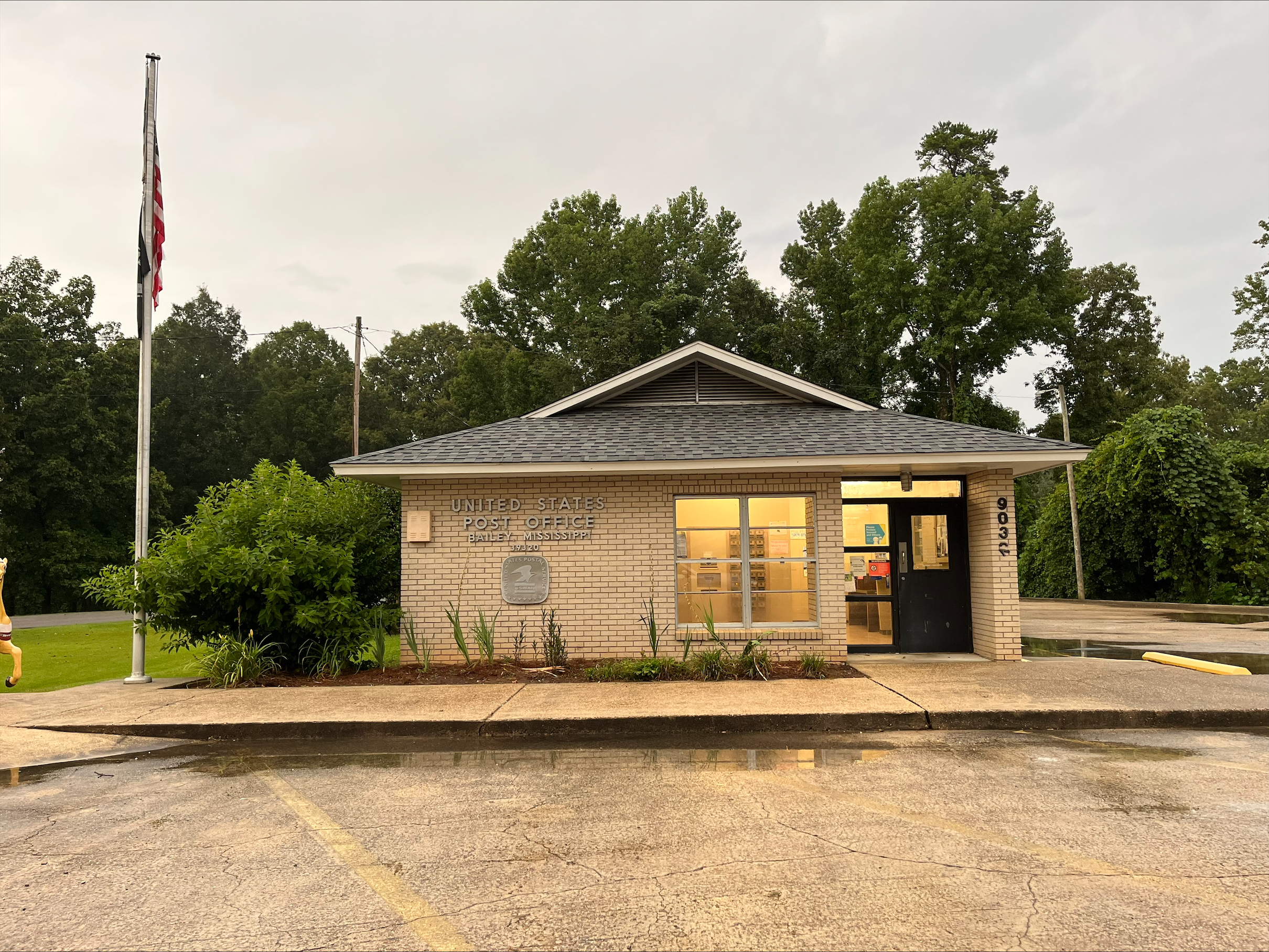
- Bailey Post Office

- Location within Mississippi Location within the United States
- Coordinates: 32°28′04″N 88°43′22″W
- Country: United States
- State: Mississippi
- County: Lauderdale
- Elevation: 390 ft (120 m)
- Time zone: UTC-6 (Central (CST))
  - Summer (DST): UTC-5 (CDT)
- ZIP code: 39320
- Area codes: 601 & 769
- GNIS feature ID: 666451

Bailey is an unincorporated community in Lauderdale County, Mississippi, United States. Its ZIP code is 39320.

== History ==
The population of Bailey in 1900 was 56. The settlement had a post office around that time.
