= Moscow, Mississippi =

- Unincorporated community
- Location in Mississippi and the United States Moscow (the United States)
- Coordinates: 32°42′36″N 88°48′0″W
- Country: United States
- State: Mississippi
- County: Kemper
- Elevation: 509 ft (155 m)
- Time zone: UTC-6 (Central (CST))
  - Summer (DST): UTC-5 (CDT)
- GNIS feature ID: 673861

Moscow is an unincorporated community in Kemper County, Mississippi. It lies along State Highway 493 southwest of the city of De Kalb, the county seat of Kemper County. Its elevation is 509 feet (155 m). A post office operated under the name Moscow from 1871 to 1922. In 1900, Moscow's population was 30.
