= Big Black River (Mississippi) =

River in the US state of Mississippi

Coordinates: 32°03′11″N 91°03′27″W

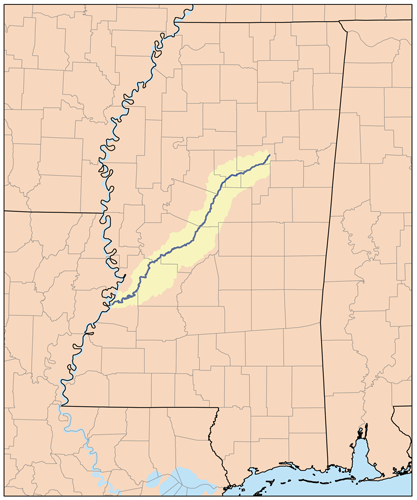

Location
- Country: United States

Physical characteristics
- Source
  - location: Webster County, Mississippi
- Mouth
  - location: Mississippi River
  - elevation: 40 feet (12 m)
- Discharge
  - location: Bovina, MS
  - average: 3,825 cu/ft. per sec.

Big Black River is a river in the U.S. state of Mississippi and a tributary of the Mississippi River. Its origin is in Webster County near the town of Eupora in the north central part of the state. From there it flows 330 miles (530 km) in a generally southwest direction until it merges with the Mississippi River 25 miles (40 km) south of the city of Vicksburg. It is the major contributor to the Big Black River Basin. It forms part of the northern border of Choctaw County, passes through Montgomery County, and forms the eastern border of Holmes County and the northern border of Claiborne County.

The Big Black River and most of its tributaries are silt-filled. The rivers carry large amounts of suspended sediment, resulting mostly from agricultural runoff. These tributaries are mostly slow-flowing muddy streams, however some are swift-flowing with sandy bottoms.

In colonial days it was sometimes called the Loosa Chitto. The Battle of Big Black River Bridge, fought during the Vicksburg campaign, was part of the Vicksburg Campaign in the American Civil War.

== Big Black River Basin ==
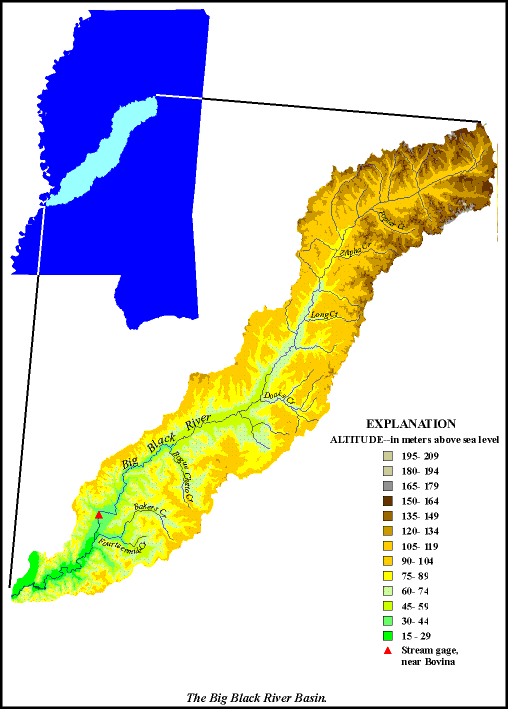
Big Black River Basin

The size of the Big Black River Basin drainage area is 3,400 square miles (8,800 km^{2}). Its elevation varies from 50 to 650 feet (14 to 198 meters) above sea level. It is 160 miles (260 km) long and averages 22 to 25 miles wide. Most of its small tributaries are in the upper part of the basin and flow only part of the year. The terrain is hilly with 56% of the land forested and 39% used for farming and cattle ranching.

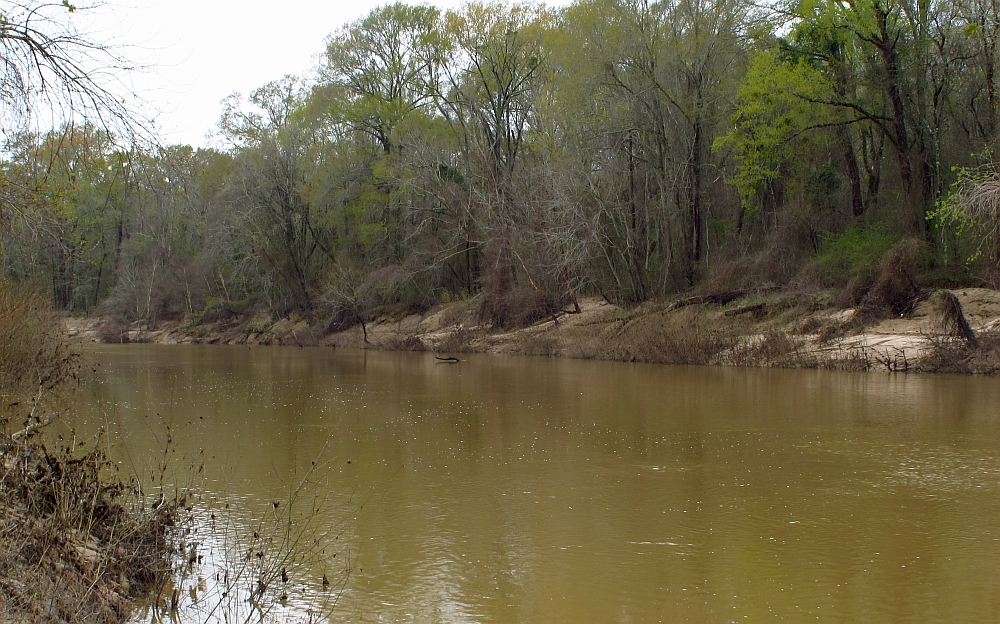
Big Black River at Highway 16 in Madison County, Mississippi.

== Battle site ==
During the American Civil War, a pivotal battle between the Union and Confederate forces occurred along the Big Black River, culminating in the Siege of Vicksburg in 1863. Commanded by General Ulysses S. Grant, Union forces defeated Confederate troops under General John C. Pemberton at the Battle of Champion Hill. Grant chased Pemberton, who was headed toward Vicksburg. Pemberton left 5,000 troops to make a stand on both sides of the Big Black River after his Champion Hill defeat, while he withdrew with his main command to nearby Vicksburg.

== See also ==
- List of rivers of Mississippi
