= Eupora High School =

Location
- 65 Clark Avenue; Eupora, Webster County, Mississippi 39744; 33.5437°N 89.2733°W

Information
- School type: Public
- School district: Webster County School District
- NCES District ID: 2804560
- Superintendent: James Mason
- NCES School ID: 280456001097
- Principal: Chip Powell
- Grades: 6-12
- Enrollment: 437
- Student to teacher ratio: 11.47
- Colors: Maroon, White
- Mascot: Eagle
- Website: https://ehs.webstercountyschools.org/

Eupora High School is a public school for grades 6 to 12 in Eupora, Mississippi. It is in the Webster County School District.

In 2025 the student body of 224 was about 2/3 white and 1/3 black. Sixty percent of students were categorized as economically disadvantaged.

== History ==
In 1892 D. Harmon was principal of the school. In 1914 A. B. Campbell was the school's superintendent.

The Works Progress Administration built the school's building from 1938 to 1940. E. L. Malvaney was its architect and it is now used as offices for the school district.

Schools were segregated in Mississippi and educational opportunities for African Americans limited. Webster County Training School was a "negro" elementary school. A photo of it exists.

In 1994 it was at 212 West Clarke Avenue.

== Extracurriculars ==
Eagles are the school mascot. The school's football team has won the district championship many times but has never won a state championship. In 2016, Ricky Williams succeeded Stephen Edwards as football coach.

A teacher at the school was fired and convicted of statutory rape.

Mrs. Russell Shaw compiled a history of the school's library used in a book on libraries in Mississippi.

== Alumni ==
- Derrick Jones, football player
- Michael Simmons, football player

== See also ==
- National Register of Historic Places listings in Webster County, Mississippi
