= Sherwood, Mississippi =

- Unincorporated community
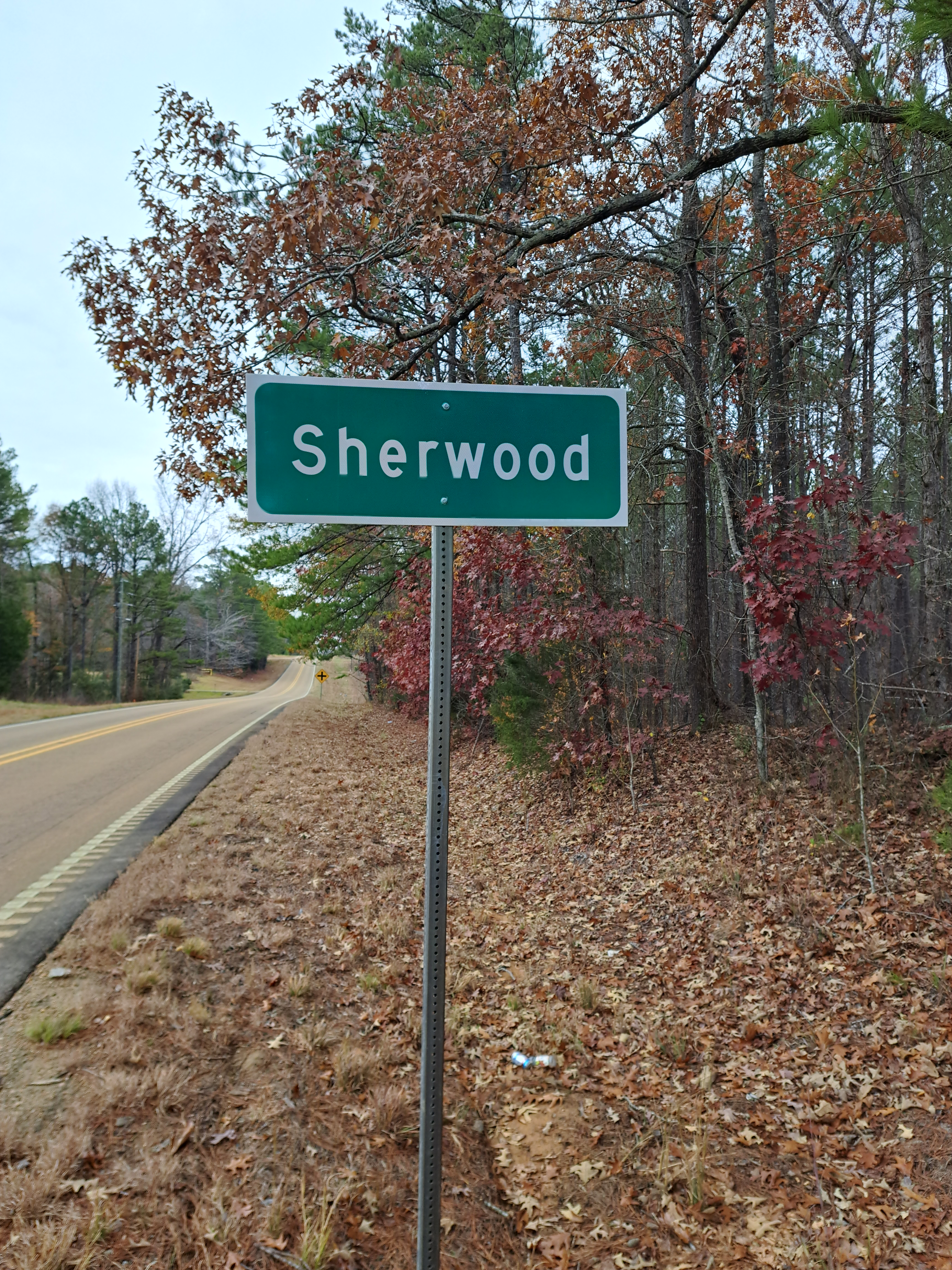

- Location within Mississippi Location within the United States
- Coordinates: 33°29′16″N 89°08′02″W
- Country: United States
- State: Mississippi
- County: Choctaw
- Elevation: 486 ft (148 m)
- Time zone: UTC-6 (Central (CST))
  - Summer (DST): UTC-5 (CDT)
- ZIP code: 39752
- Area code: 662
- GNIS feature ID: 676586

Sherwood is an unincorporated community located in Choctaw County, Mississippi, United States, along Mississippi Highway 15 and is approximately 3 miles (4.8 km) south of Mathiston and 4 miles (6.4 km) north of Reform.
