= WFCA (FM) =

Coordinates: 33.4237°N 89.4037°W

- Ackerman, Mississippi; United States
- Broadcast area: Central Mississippi
- Frequency: 107.9 MHz
- Branding: Good News Radio

Programming
- Format: Contemporary Christian Music

Ownership
- Owner: French Camp Radio, Inc.

History
- First air date: 1984/10/13

Technical information
- Licensing authority: FCC
- Facility ID: 22628
- Class: C
- ERP: 100,000 watts
- HAAT: 307 meters (1,007 ft)

Links
- Public license information: Public file; LMS
- Webcast: Listen Live
- Website: wfca.fm

WFCA (107.9 FM, branded “Good News Radio”) is a commercial nonprofit Christian radio station licensed to Ackerman, Mississippi, with studios in French Camp, Mississippi on the Natchez Trace Parkway. It is licensed to French Camp Radio, Inc. and operates as a support ministry of French Camp Academy. The station broadcasts a Contemporary Christian Music format under the name “Good News Radio”, WFCA signed on in 1984 and transmits with 100,000 watts, reaching listeners across central Mississippi. The station also has a significant sports schedule, broadcasting Mississippi State University athletics, East Mississippi Community College football and local high school football.

== Background ==
French Camp Academy was founded in 1885 by Scotch-Irish Presbyterians as two schools, the Central Mississippi Institute for girls and the French Camp Academy for boys. The two merged after a fire destroyed the girls’ school in 1915. In 1950 the academy was reorganized under an interdenominational board of trustees. It is now an independent Christian boarding school serving young people and families in crisis.

== Founding ==
According to the academy, the idea for a radio station came from its president, H. Richard Cannon, during a mission trip to New Guinea. WFCA signed on in 1984 as a supporting arm of the academy and its surrounding community.

== Technical Information ==
WFCA is a Class C station with an effective radiated power of 100,000 watts, and its antenna stands 307 metres (1,007 ft) above average terrain.[3] Its transmitter tower is on the highest point in Choctaw County, just south of Stewart and about nine miles from the studios. From there its signal reaches close to a 100-mile radius across central Mississippi.
