= National Register of Historic Places listings in Webster County, Mississippi =

Location of Webster County in Mississippi

This is a list of the National Register of Historic Places listings in Webster County, Mississippi.

This is intended to be a complete list of the properties and districts on the National Register of Historic Places in Webster County, Mississippi, United States. Latitude and longitude coordinates are provided for many National Register properties and districts; these locations may be seen together in a map.

There are 3 properties and districts listed on the National Register in the county.

This National Park Service list is complete through NPS recent listings posted March 14, 2025.

== Current listings ==
	Name on the Register	Image	Date listed	Location	City or town	Description
1	Eupora Historic District		July 20, 2011 (#11000472)	Roughly along N. Dunn St. & W. Roane Ave. 33°32′27″N 89°16′07″W	Eupora	
2	Pittman Log House		October 7, 2020 (#100005671)	1316 Pepper Town Rd. 33°38′33″N 89°16′26″W	Eupora vicinity	
3	Wood Home for Boys		April 5, 1984 (#84002448)	Horton St. 33°32′42″N 89°07′32″W	Mathiston	

== See also ==
- List of National Historic Landmarks in Mississippi
- National Register of Historic Places listings in Mississippi
