= Chester, Mississippi =

- Unincorporated community
- Location within Mississippi Location within the United States
- Coordinates: 33°21′31″N 89°14′18″W
- Country: United States
- State: Mississippi
- County: Choctaw
- Elevation: 531 ft (162 m)
- Time zone: UTC-6 (Central (CST))
  - Summer (DST): UTC-5 (CDT)
- Area code: 662
- GNIS feature ID: 692883

Chester is an unincorporated community located in Choctaw County, Mississippi, United States, nine miles northwest of Ackerman.

== History ==
Chester was named after Chester, South Carolina and was made the county seat of Choctaw County in 1874.

Chester was the sole county seat from 1874 until 1887. During this period of time, Chester was a prosperous town with many businesses, lawyers, and doctors located around the town square. This changed, however, in 1883, when the Canton, Aberdeen, and Nashville Railroad was completed through Choctaw County. The railroad ran through Choctaw County several miles south of Chester, and many residents of the community moved to live closer to the railroad.

In 1887, a second county courthouse was erected in Ackerman, which was located on the new railroad. Chester then became the seat of the First Judicial District of Choctaw County, while Ackerman held the Second Judicial District. Chester continued to decline, however, and on August 23, 1922, the voters of Choctaw County by a margin of 1,307 to 232 voted to consolidate the two judicial districts, ending Chester's role as a county seat of Choctaw. The courthouse was used as a school until it burned in 1928. Chester is now a small, unincorporated community with few residents and almost no business near the old town square, though there is an active Baptist church (Chester Baptist Church) located in the area.

A post office operated under the name Chester from 1876 to 1959.

The Red Hills Mine (a reclaimed open-pit lignite mine) opened nearby in 1998, with the first excavation in 1999. Coal from the mine feeds the Red Hills Power Plant, which supplies electricity to the Tennessee Valley Authority (TVA).
