= Bankston, Mississippi =

- Ghost town
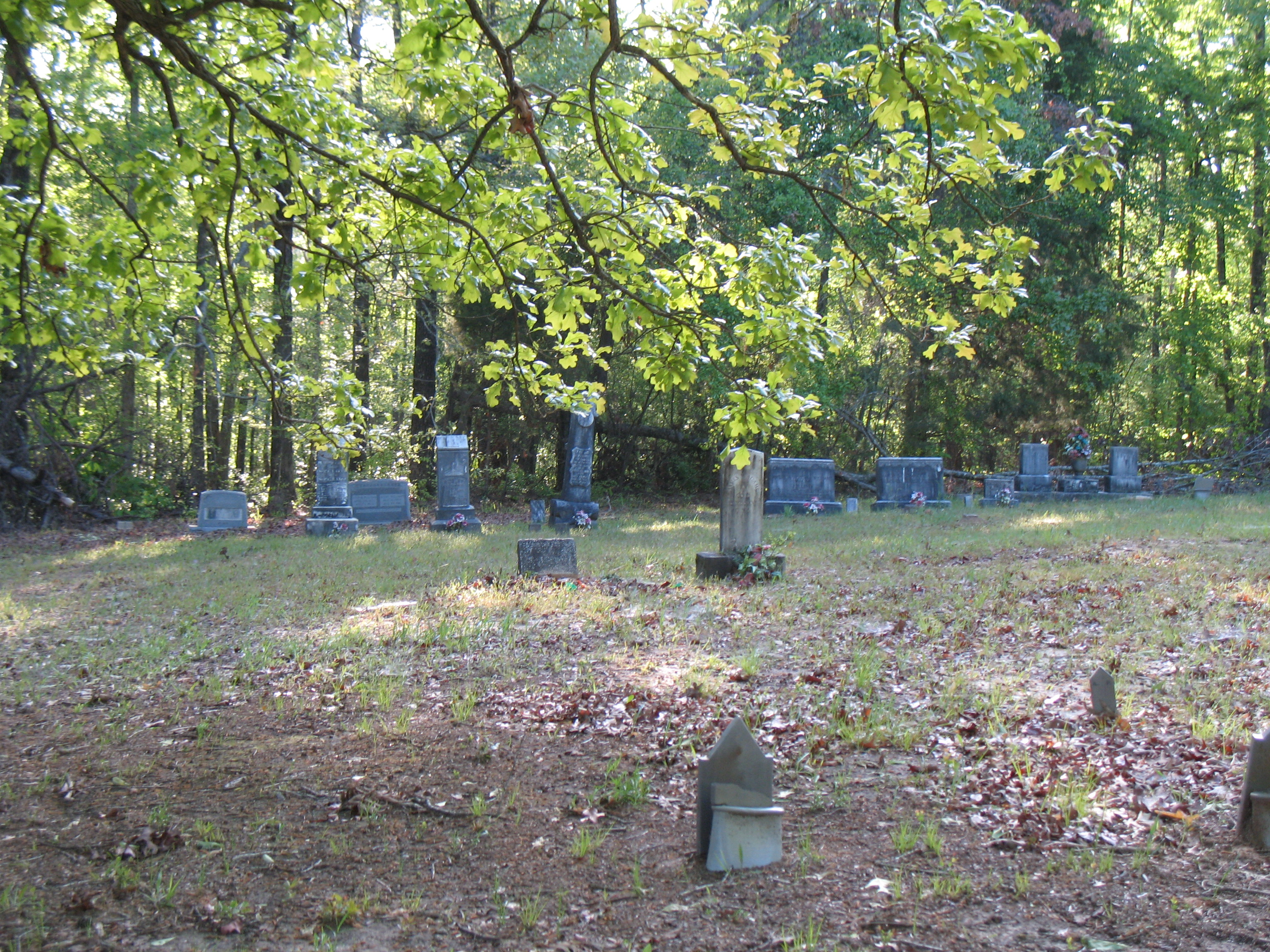
- Bankston Cemetery in 2007

- Location within Mississippi Location within the United States
- Coordinates: 33°23′50″N 89°22′00″W
- Country: United States
- State: Mississippi
- County: Choctaw
- Elevation: 410 ft (120 m)
- Time zone: UTC-6 (Central (CST))
  - Summer (DST): UTC-5 (CDT)
- Area code: Area code 601
- GNIS feature ID: 707488

Bankston is a ghost town in Choctaw County, Mississippi, United States. The nearest community is French Camp, located 8 mi (13 km) south-southwest.

== History ==
In 1848, the first successful, mechanically powered textile mill in Mississippi was founded in Bankston by James Madison Wesson. It was named for one of Wesson's financial backers, Mr. Banks from Columbus, Georgia. Located on McCurtain's Creek, a tributary of the Big Black River, the Bankston Textile Mill, also known as Mississippi Manufacturing Company, produced cloth and shoes for the Confederacy after Mississippi seceded from the Union.

Because of its isolated location in the backwoods of Choctaw County, the Bankston Mill continued to operate through 1864. The end came when scouts for the Union Army learned that the mill was turning out one thousand yards of cloth and 150 pairs of shoes each day. Benjamin Grierson’s federal troops arrived on the night of December 30, 1864, and set fire to the cotton factory, the wool factory, the flour mill, and the shoe factory while locals slept. Another factory was established in Bankston after the war, but was also burned.

The population in 1900 was 84. Around that time the settlement had a post office and a grist mill. The post office operated under the name Bankston from 1850 to 1905.

All that remains of the town is the Bankston Cemetery.
