= Michael Simmons (American football) =

American football player (born 1965)

No. 96
- Position: Defensive end

Personal information
- Born: November 14, 1965 (age 60); Eupora, Mississippi, U.S.
- Listed height: 6 ft 4 in (1.93 m)
- Listed weight: 269 lb (122 kg)

Career information
- High school: Eupora
- College: Mississippi State
- NFL draft: 1988: undrafted

Career history
- Phoenix Cardinals (1988)*; New Orleans Saints (1989–1990); Frankfurt Galaxy (1992)
- * Offseason or practice squad member only
- Stats at Pro Football Reference

Michael Glenn Simmons (born November 14, 1965) is an American former professional football defensive end who played for the New Orleans Saints of the National Football League (NFL). He played college football for the Mississippi State Bulldogs.

== Early life ==
Michael Glenn Simmons was born on November 14, 1965, in Eupora, Mississippi. He attended Eupora High School.

== College career ==
Simmons enrolled at Mississippi State University to play college football for the Bulldogs. He was a four-year letterman from 1984 to 1987.

== Professional career ==
After going undrafted in the 1988 NFL draft, Simmons signed with the Phoenix Cardinals on May 24. He was released on August 30, 1988.

On October 12, 1988, Simmons signed a futures contract with the New Orleans Saints for the 1989 season. He was released on September 5, 1989, and signed to the practice squad the next day. He was promoted to the active roster on December 20, 1989. Simmons played in the regular season finale in a reserve role, but did not record any statistics. He led all Saints defensive linemen during the 1990 preseason with eight solo tackles and two sacks. He was named the starter for the regular season over first-round draft pick Renaldo Turnbull. Simmons started for the Saints in Week 1, Week 2, and Week 16, playing the other 13 games as a backup. He finished the 1990 regular season with one sack and one fumble recovery. He also appeared in one playoff game that year. Simmons was released on August 25, 1991.

In February 1992, Simmons was selected by the Frankfurt Galaxy of the World League of American Football (WLAF) in the first round, with the eighth overall pick, of the 1992 WLAF draft. He was released on May 7, 1992.
