= Penn Tech =

Penn Tech may refer to two post-secondary schools in the United States:

- Pennsylvania Institute of Technology, an independent junior college in Media and Philadelphia, Pennsylvania.
- Pennsylvania College of Technology, a college affiliated with the Pennsylvania State University located in Williamsport, Pennsylvania.

== See also ==
- Penn State, a state-related land-grant university located in State College, Pennsylvania
