= East Webster High School =

Coordinates: 33.6212°N 89.0813°W

Location
- 195 Old Cumberland Road; Maben, Mississippi; 39750

Information
- School type: Public
- Established: 1986
- School district: Webster County School District
- NCES District ID: 2804560
- Superintendent: James Mason
- NCES School ID: 280456000852
- Principal: Corey Stidham
- Teaching staff: 28.92 (FTE)
- Grades: 6-12
- Enrollment: 458 (2023-2024)
- Student to teacher ratio: 15.84
- Colors: Maroon and White
- Mascot: Wolverine
- Website: ewhs.webstercountyschools.org

East Webster High School is in Maben, Mississippi. In 2022 it had 485 students with 83.5 percent white and 13.4 percent black. Its test scores were above the state average in reading and math.

It is in the Webster County School District.

== Athletics ==
Wolverines are the school mascot. The school won its first state championship in football in 2025, defeating Heidelberg for the 2A title. In 2024 the school won a 3A baseball championship. In 2022 the school won a 2A softball championship. Also in 2015 it won its first girls basketball title..

== History ==
East Webster High School was founded in 1986 after two existing schools consolidated into one.

In 1990, the Clarion-Ledger reported that a white teacher was suspended for five days for slapping a black student. The NAACP took legal action in an attempt to get the teacher fired. In 2007, a similar incident occurred where a former principal was put on trial for paddling a student too severely.

In 2011, the school was destroyed by a tornado. The property of Wood Junior College served as a temporary home for the students while the school was being rebuilt. The school was rebuilt by 2013.

== Alumni ==
- Johnthan Banks, football player

== See also ==
- List of high schools in Mississippi
