= WFCA =

WFCA may refer to:

- WFCA (FM), a radio station (107.9 FM) licensed to serve French Camp, Mississippi, United States
- WFCA Plc, an advertising agency group
- Welsh Federation of Coarse Anglers, the national governing body for coarse fishing in Wales
- Wisconsin Football Coaches Association, an association of football coaches for all levels in the state of Wisconsin
