= Fame, Mississippi =

- Unincorporated community
- Location within Mississippi Location within the United States
- Coordinates: 33°39′50″N 89°12′05″W
- Country: United States
- State: Mississippi
- County: Webster
- Elevation: 482 ft (147 m)
- Time zone: UTC-6 (Central (CST))
  - Summer (DST): UTC-5 (CDT)
- ZIP code: 39751
- Area code: 662
- GNIS feature ID: 705691

Fame is an unincorporated community located in Webster County, Mississippi, United States. Fame is approximately 4.9 miles (7.9 km) north-northeast of Hohenlinden and approximately 9.3 miles (15.0 km) south-southwest of Eupora.

Fame had a school, and a post office from 1875 to 1909. The Fame Church is still located there.
