= French Camp =

French Camp can refer to:

- French Camp, California, in San Joaquin County
- French Camp, Mississippi
