= Embry =

Embry may refer to:

== People ==
- Aaron Embry (born 1975), American musician
- Ashton F. Embry (born 1946), Canadian research scientist
- Basil Embry (1902–1977), British air force commander
- C. B. Embry (1941-2022), American politician
- Eric Embry (born 1959), American wrestler
- Ethan Embry (born 1978), American actor
- T. Higbee Embry (1897–1946), American aviator
- James Kenneth Embry, Jr. (died 2014), died after hunger strike in Kentucky State Penitentiary
- Norris Embry (1921–1981), American artist
- Paddy Embry (born 1942), Australian politician
- Wayne Embry (born 1937), American basketball player

== Places ==
- Embry, Pas-de-Calais, a commune in northern France
- Embry, Mississippi, an unincorporated community, United States

== Other uses ==
- Embry–Riddle Aeronautical University (ERAU)
- Embry Call, fictional character in the Twilight novels by Stephenie Meyer
- Don Embry, fictional character in the television series Big Love
