= Grady, Mississippi =

- Unincorporated community
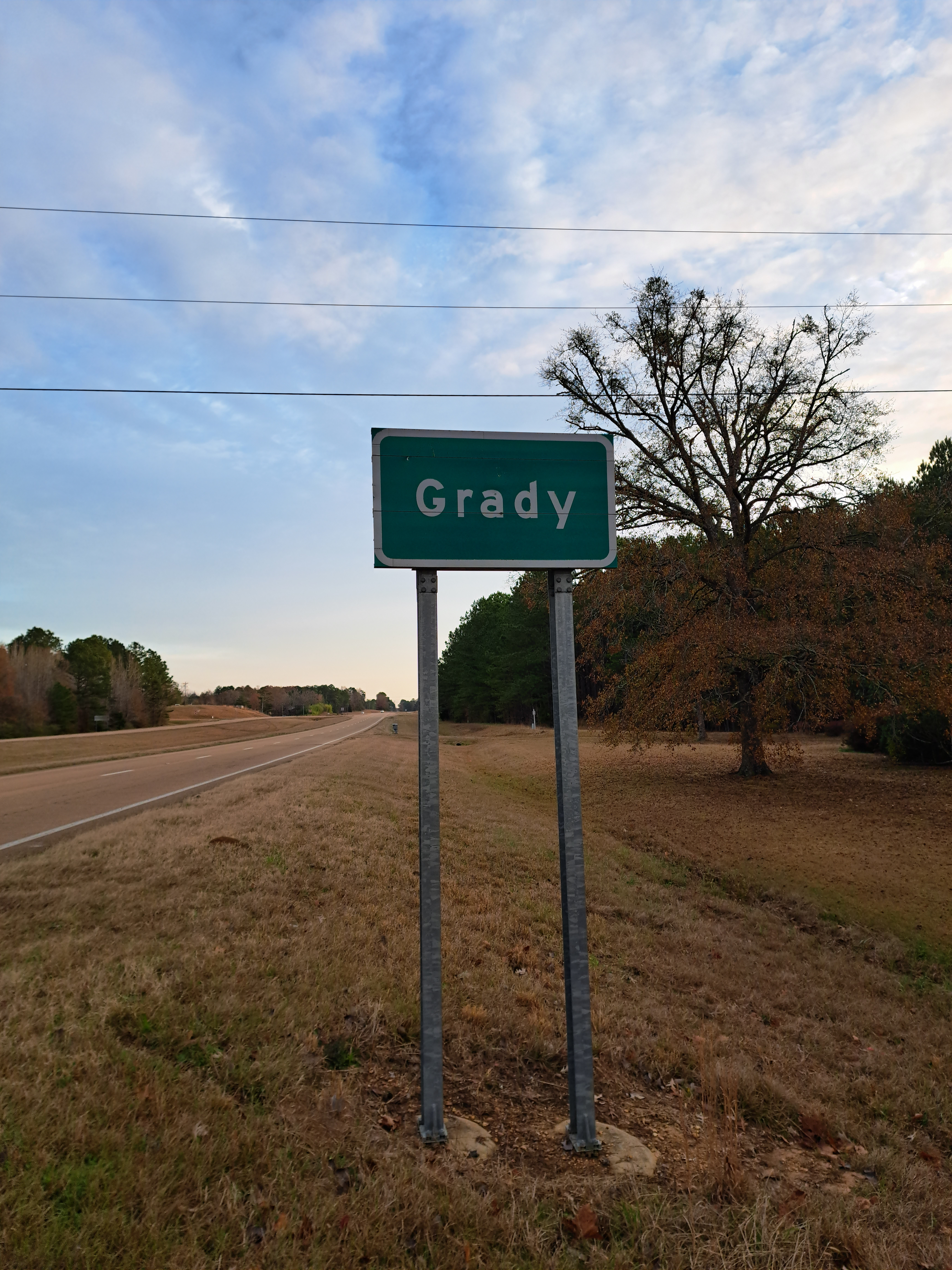

- Location within Mississippi Location within the United States
- Coordinates: 33°30′46″N 89°13′31″W
- Country: United States
- State: Mississippi
- County: Webster
- Elevation: 354 ft (108 m)
- Time zone: UTC-6 (Central (CST))
  - Summer (DST): UTC-5 (CDT)
- ZIP code: 39744
- Area code: 662
- GNIS feature ID: 691898

Grady is an unincorporated community located in Webster County, Mississippi, United States, along U.S. Route 82. Grady is approximately 3 miles (4.8 km) southwest of Eupora.
