= List of private junior colleges in the United States =

This is a list of private junior colleges in the United States. It excludes public two-year community colleges.

== California ==
- California Preparatory College, Redlands
- Deep Springs College, Deep Springs Valley
- MTI College, Sacramento

== Colorado ==
- Colorado School of Trades, Lakewood

== Georgia ==
- Oxford College, Oxford

== Hawaii ==
- Hawaii Tokai International College, Honolulu

== Kansas ==
- Hesston College, Hesston

== Massachusetts ==
- Labouré College, Boston (closing in August 2026)

== Minnesota ==
- Maranatha Bible School, Lansing

== New Jersey ==
- Assumption College for Sisters, Denville

== North Carolina ==
- Louisburg College, Louisburg

== Ohio ==
- Rosedale Bible College, Rosedale

== Pennsylvania ==
- Harcum College, Bryn Mawr
- Valley Forge Military Academy and College, Wayne
- Williamson College of the Trades, Media

== Texas ==
- Jacksonville College, Jacksonville

== West Virginia ==
- Huntington Junior College, Huntington
- West Virginia Junior College, Bridgeport, Charleston and Morgantown

== Defunct ==
=== California ===
- Cumnock College, Los Angeles (closed 1942)
- Cumnock Junior College, Los Angeles (closed 1930)
- Cumnock School of Expression, Los Angeles (closed 1942)

=== Connecticut ===
- Lincoln College of New England, Southington (closed 2018)

=== Hawaii ===
- TransPacific Hawaii College, Honolulu (closed 2009)

=== Indiana ===
- Ancilla College, Donaldson (defunct, merged into Marian University in 2021)

=== Maine ===
- Andover College, Portland (merged into Kaplan University in 2010)

=== Mississippi ===
- Mary Holmes College, West Point (closed 2005)
- Mississippi Industrial College, Holly Springs (closed 1982)
- Wood Junior College, Mathiston (closed 2003)

=== New York ===
- Bennett College (closed 1977)

=== Ohio ===
- Chatfield College, St. Martin (closed 2023)

=== Tennessee ===
- Hiwassee College, Madisonville (closed 2019)

=== Texas ===
- Lon Morris College, Jacksonville (closed 2012)

== See also ==
- Lists of American universities and colleges
- List of community colleges in the United States
- State community college systems
