= Pennsylvania Institute of Technology =

Private junior college Upper Providence Township, Pennsylvania, US

- Type: Private junior college
- Established: 1953
- President: Harry Matthew (Matt) Meyers
- Faculty: 76
- Administrative staff: 48
- Total staff: 124
- Students: 651
- Undergraduates: 651
- Location: 800 Manchester Avenue, Media, Pennsylvania 19063, Media, Pennsylvania, 19063, U.S. 39.908°N 75.389°W
- Campus: 14 acres (5.7 ha); Suburban
- Mascot: Garri the Monster
- Website: www.pit.edu

Pennsylvania Institute of Technology (P.I.T. or PenTech) is a private junior college and technical school in Upper Providence Township, Delaware County, Pennsylvania, near Media. The college, which typically enrolls between 450 and 850 students, is accredited by the Middle States Commission on Higher Education.

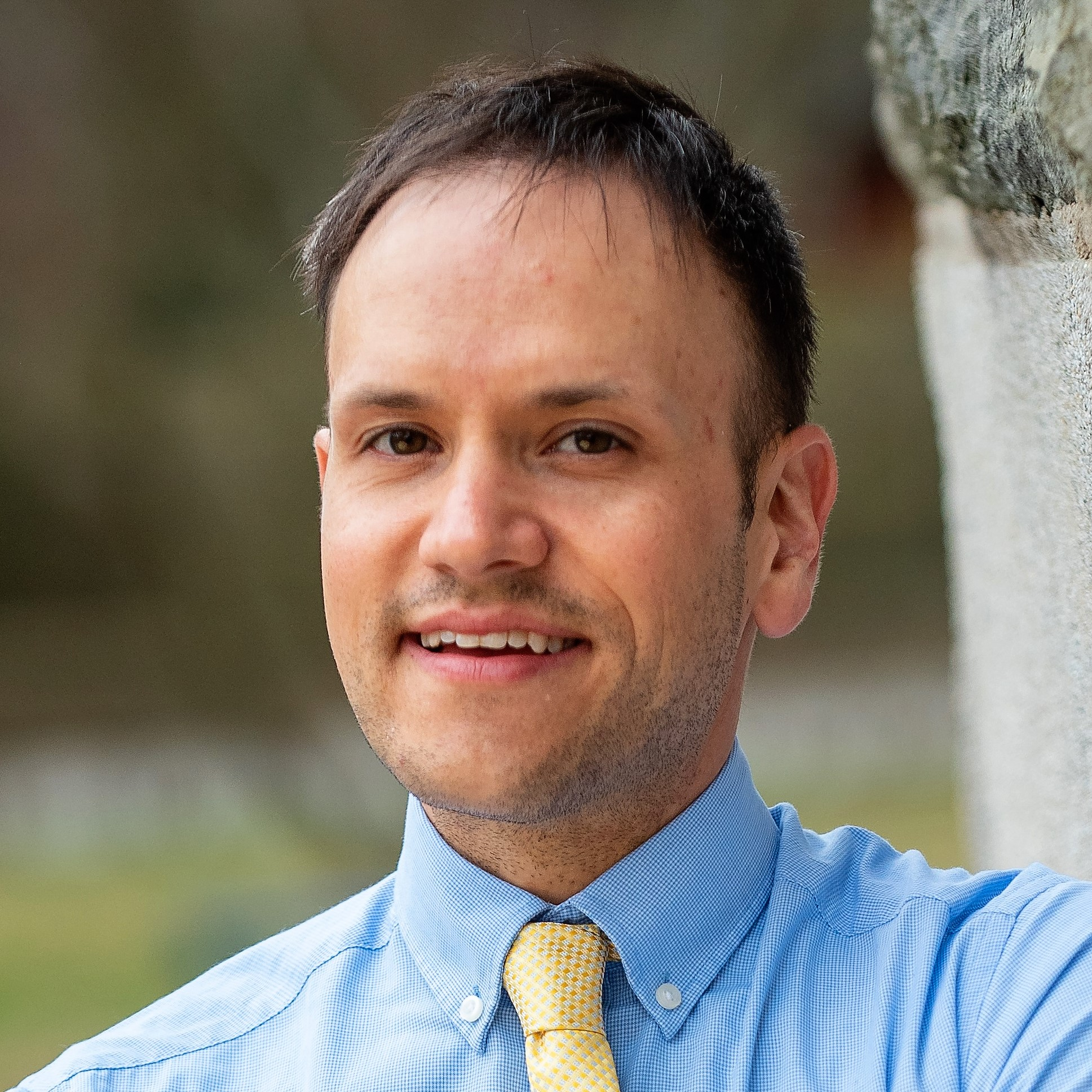
Harry Matthew (Matt) Meyers, President

== History ==
PIT was founded in 1953 by Walter Garrison, an aerospace engineer, to provide math and science training for pre-engineering students. Until 1982, the school was located in a collection of buildings in Upper Darby; fourteen acres were purchased to construct a new campus in the late 1970s. In 1976, P.I.T. was approved by the Pennsylvania Department of Education to award specialized associate degrees. In 1983, P.I.T. gained accreditation from the Middle States Commission on Higher Education (now the Middle States Commission on Higher Education). In 2021, Middle States Commission on Higher Education approved the college's awarding of Bachelor's Degrees.

== Academics ==
PIT offers bachelor's degrees, associate degrees, and certificate programs.

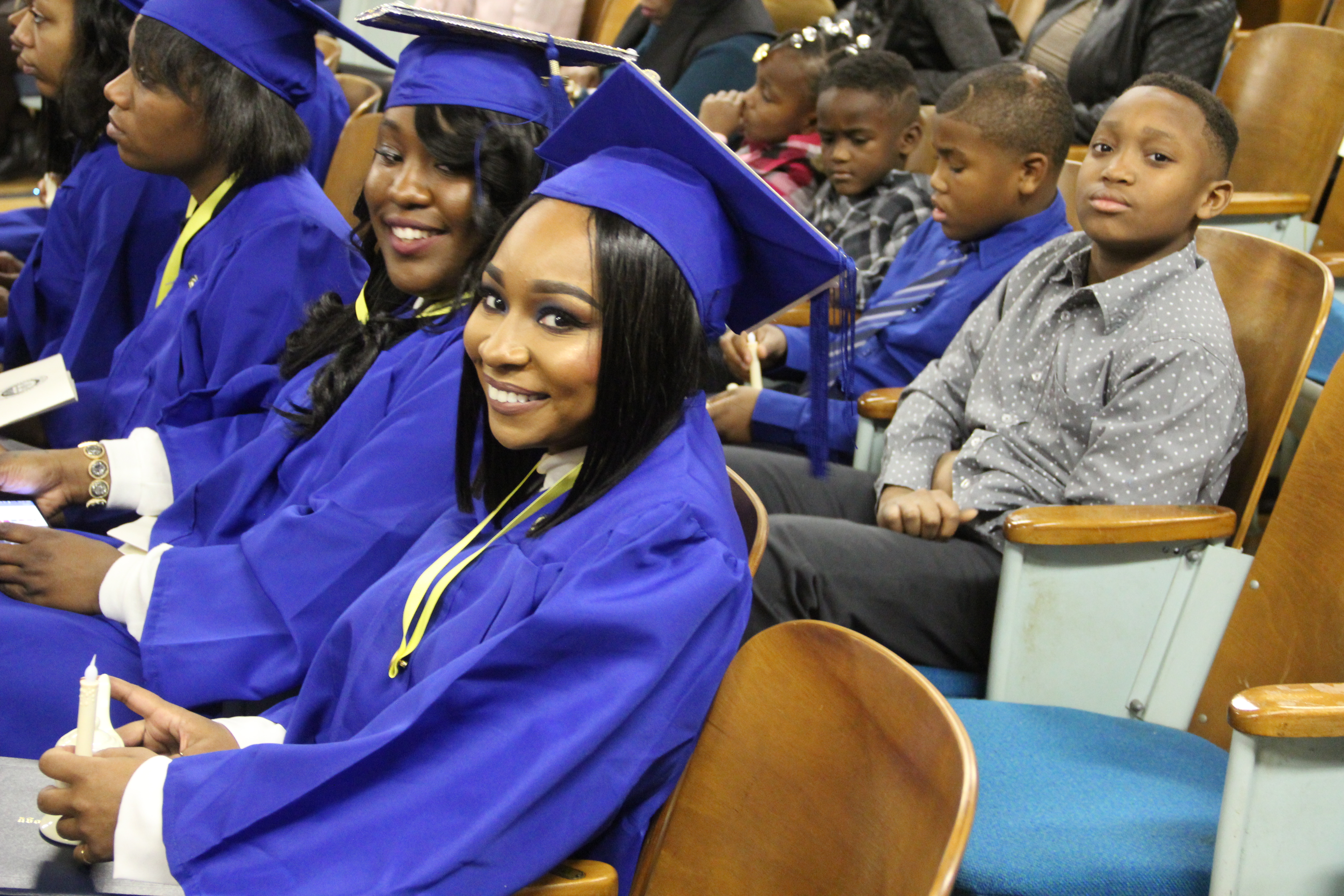
