= WEPA (AM) =

Radio station in Eupora, Mississippi (1974–1998)

- Eupora, Mississippi; United States
- Frequency: 710 kHz

Ownership
- Owner: Tri County Broadcasting Company, Inc.

History
- First air date: May 3, 1974; 52 years ago
- Last air date: October 1998; 27 years ago

Technical information
- Facility ID: 67653
- Power: 2,500 watts (daytime only)
- Transmitter coordinates: 33°32′42″N 89°13′58.8″W

WEPA was a radio station on 710 AM in Eupora, Mississippi, operating between 1974 and 1998.

== History ==
WEPA signed on the air May 3, 1974, owned by Tri County Broadcasting Company, a subsidiary of Sisk Broadcasting. The first announcer on WEPA was Mackey Dozier. An FM station, WEXA 101.7 (now WLZA), was added on September 1, 1978, with the two stations sharing about 20 percent of their programming.

WEPA primarily carried a country music format as "King Country" for most of its history, with gospel music on Sundays. Harry and Carolyn Jackson were the longtime station and program managers, respectively; they hosted a tradio program known as The Party Line Program six days a week.

In 1998, new studios were built for WLZA in Starkville; by that October, WEPA signed off the air. The WEPA license was returned to the Federal Communications Commission (FCC) in August 2000. The former Eupora facilities burned down in 2005.
