= Marckell Patterson =

American basketball player

Marckell Patterson (born 1979 in Eupora, Mississippi) is an American professional basketball player. He played as a shooting guard. He is a 1997 graduate of Eupora High School and he played college basketball at Mississippi State University in Starkville.
