= Walthall, Mississippi =

- Village
- Location of Walthall, Mississippi

- Location in the United States
- Coordinates: 33°36′24″N 89°16′44″W
- Country: United States
- State: Mississippi
- County: Webster

Area
  - Total: 0.98 sq mi (2.53 km^{2})
  - Land: 0.97 sq mi (2.52 km^{2})
  - Water: 0.0039 sq mi (0.01 km^{2})
- Elevation: 466 ft (142 m)

Population (2020)
  - Total: 116
  - Density: 119.1/sq mi (45.99/km^{2})
- Time zone: UTC-6 (Central (CST))
  - Summer (DST): UTC-5 (CDT)
- ZIP code: 39771
- Area code: 662
- FIPS code: 28-77640
- GNIS feature ID: 0679315

Walthall is a village in Webster County, Mississippi. As of the 2020 census, Walthall had a population of 116. It is the county seat of Webster County, designated in 1876, and also the smallest county seat in Mississippi by population.

== Geography ==
According to the United States Census Bureau, the village has a total area of 1.0 square mile (2.6 km^{2}), all land.

== Demographics ==
Historical population
Census	Pop.	Note	%±
1880	101		—
1890	122		20.8%
1900	170		39.3%
1910	171		0.6%
1920	114		−33.3%
1930	124		8.8%
1940	142		14.5%
1950	149		4.9%
1960	153		2.7%
1970	161		5.2%
1980	206		28.0%
1990	167		−18.9%
2000	170		1.8%
2010	144		−15.3%
2020	116		−19.4%
U.S. Decennial Census

As of the census of 2000, there were 170 people, 61 households, and 50 families residing in the village. The population density was 173.0 inhabitants per square mile (66.8/km^{2}). There were 69 housing units at an average density of 70.2 per square mile (27.1/km^{2}). The racial makeup of the village was 92.94% White, 3.53% African American, 0.59% Asian, 0.59% from other races, and 2.35% from two or more races. Hispanic or Latino of any race were 1.18% of the population.

There were 61 households, out of which 41.0% had children under the age of 18 living with them, 68.9% were married couples living together, 6.6% had a female householder with no husband present, and 18.0% were non-families. 18.0% of all households were made up of individuals, and 9.8% had someone living alone who was 65 years of age or older. The average household size was 2.79 and the average family size was 3.18.

In the village, the population was spread out, with 31.8% under the age of 18, 10.6% from 18 to 24, 25.3% from 25 to 44, 21.2% from 45 to 64, and 11.2% who were 65 years of age or older. The median age was 30 years. For every 100 females, there were 107.3 males. For every 100 females age 18 and over, there were 93.3 males.

The median income for a household in the village was $31,000, and the median income for a family was $36,875. Males had a median income of $30,417 versus $23,750 for females. The per capita income for the village was $14,903. About 24.6% of families and 21.2% of the population were below the poverty line, including 22.4% of those under the age of eighteen and 57.9% of those 65 or over.

== Education ==
The Village of Walthall is served by the Webster County School District.
