= Johnthan Banks =

American football player (born 1989)

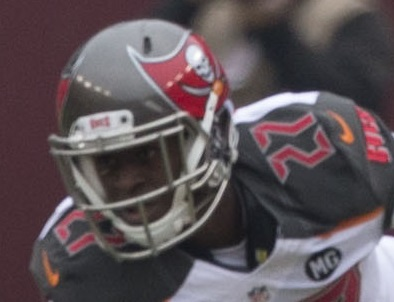
- Banks with the Tampa Bay Buccaneers in 2014

No. 27, 35, 39, 33
- Position: Cornerback

Personal information
- Born: October 3, 1989 (age 37); Maben, Mississippi, U.S.
- Listed height: 6 ft 2 in (1.88 m)
- Listed weight: 185 lb (84 kg)

Career information
- High school: East Webster (Maben)
- College: Mississippi State (2009–2012)
- NFL draft: 2013: 2nd round, 43rd overall pick

Career history
- Tampa Bay Buccaneers (2013–2016); Detroit Lions (2016); Chicago Bears (2016); Houston Texans (2017)

Awards and highlights
- Jim Thorpe Award (2012); First-team All-American (2012); First-team All-SEC (2012); Second-team All-SEC (2011)

Career NFL statistics
- Total tackles: 146
- Pass deflections: 17
- Interceptions: 7
- Defensive touchdowns: 1
- Stats at Pro Football Reference

Johnthan Shuntay Banks (born October 3, 1989) is an American former professional football player who was a cornerback in the National Football League (NFL). He played college football at Mississippi State, where he received All-American honors. He was selected by the Tampa Bay Buccaneers in the second round of the 2013 NFL draft.

== Early life ==
Banks was born in Maben, Mississippi. He attended East Webster High School in Cumberland, where he played safety and quarterback for the East Webster Wolverines high school football team.

Considered a three-star recruit by 247Sports.com, Banks was listed as the No. 41 safety in the nation in 2009.

== College career ==
Banks enrolled in Mississippi State University, where he played for the Mississippi State Bulldogs football team from 2009 to 2012. He compiled 221 tackles, a school record, 16 interceptions, four quarterback sacks and four touchdowns. He was originally a safety, but made the switch to cornerback as a sophomore. Following his senior season in 2012, he won the Jim Thorpe Award for the top defensive back in college football. He also received first-team All-American honors from the Football Writers Association of America, the Walter Camp Football Foundation, and Scout.com, and was a first-team All-Southeastern Conference (SEC) selection.

== Professional career ==
=== Pre-draft ===
Prior to the 2013 NFL draft, Banks was considered one of the best cornerback prospects but after the disappointing NFL combine, most NFL scouts put him as a late first-round or an early second-round pick.

Pre-draft measurables
| Height | Weight | Arm length | Hand span | 40-yard dash | 10-yard split | 20-yard split | 20-yard shuttle | Three-cone drill | Vertical jump | Broad jump | Bench press |
|---|---|---|---|---|---|---|---|---|---|---|---|
| 6 ft 2 in (1.88 m) | 186 lb (84 kg) | 33 7/8 in (0.86 m) | 9 1/4 in (0.23 m) | 4.59 s | 1.59 s | 2.61 s | 4.27 s | 6.97 s | 34.5 in (0.88 m) | 10 ft 6 in (3.20 m) | 10 reps |
All values from NFL Combine

=== Tampa Bay Buccaneers ===
On April 26, 2013, Banks was selected by the Tampa Bay Buccaneers in the second round (43rd overall) in the 2013 NFL draft. He was the sixth cornerback taken in the 2013 NFL draft behind Dee Milliner, D. J. Hayden, Desmond Trufant, Xavier Rhodes, and fellow college teammate Darius Slay, respectively. On May 23, Banks signed his four-year contract with the Tampa Bay Buccaneers, worth $4.726 million, including a $1.817 million bonus. Banks got his first interception against Carson Palmer and the Arizona Cardinals on September 29. During the season, he contracted methicillin-resistant Staphylococcus aureus (MSRA). Despite the infection, he finished his rookie season with 55 tackles and 3 interceptions.

After training camp and the preseason, Banks was named the starting cornerback opposite Alterraun Verner. The Tampa 2 system installed by head coach Lovie Smith proved to play to Banks' strengths as he notched 50 tackles, 10 passes defensed, and four interceptions for the 2014 season.

=== Detroit Lions ===
On November 1, 2016, Banks was traded to the Detroit Lions for a conditional seventh round pick in the 2018 NFL draft. He was released by the Lions on December 3.

=== Chicago Bears ===
On December 5, 2016, Banks was signed by the Chicago Bears.

On March 11, 2017, Banks signed a one-year contract with the Bears. He was released on September 2.

=== Houston Texans ===
On September 20, 2017, Banks signed with the Houston Texans. He was released on October 10.

== NFL career statistics ==
Legend
| **Bold** | Career high |

| Year | Team | Games | | Tackles | | | | | Interceptions | | | | | Fumbles | | | |
| Year | Team | GP | GS | Cmb | Solo | Ast | Sck | TFL | Int | Yds | TD | Lng | PD | FF | FR | Yds | TD |
|---|---|---|---|---|---|---|---|---|---|---|---|---|---|---|---|---|---|
| 2013 | TAM | **16** | **16** | **55** | **49** | 6 | 0.0 | **1** | 3 | 33 | 0 | 18 | 5 | 0 | 0 | 0 | 0 |
| 2014 | TAM | 15 | 14 | 50 | 41 | **9** | 0.0 | **1** | **4** | **69** | **1** | **32** | **10** | 0 | 0 | 0 | 0 |
| 2015 | TAM | 14 | 7 | 25 | 19 | 6 | 0.0 | 0 | 0 | 0 | 0 | 0 | 1 | 0 | 0 | 0 | 0 |
| 2016 | TAM | 5 | 0 | 0 | 0 | 0 | 0.0 | 0 | 0 | 0 | 0 | 0 | 0 | 0 | 0 | 0 | 0 |
| 2016 | DET | 2 | 0 | 2 | 2 | 0 | 0.0 | 0 | 0 | 0 | 0 | 0 | 0 | 0 | 0 | 0 | 0 |
| 2016 | CHI | 2 | 2 | 4 | 2 | 2 | 0.0 | 0 | 0 | 0 | 0 | 0 | 1 | 0 | 0 | 0 | 0 |
| 2017 | HOU | 3 | 1 | 10 | 8 | 2 | 0.0 | 0 | 0 | 0 | 0 | 0 | 0 | 0 | 0 | 0 | 0 |
| | | 57 | 40 | 146 | 121 | 25 | 0.0 | 2 | 7 | 102 | 1 | 32 | 17 | 0 | 0 | 0 | 0 |
