= Sapa, Mississippi =

Community in Mississippi, United States

Coordinates: 33°32′51″N 89°12′07″W

Sapa is an unincorporated community in Webster County, in the U.S. state of Mississippi.

== History ==
Sapa was founded in the 1880s, when the railroad was extended to there. A post office was established in Sapa in 1889, remaining in operation until 1935. The name "Sapa" may be derived from Choctaw meaning "cornfield", although folk etymology holds the name is derived from a question, i.e. "Say, Pa! What are they going to name this place?"
