= WLZA =

Radio station in Eupora, Mississippi

Coordinates: 33.548°N 89.056°W

- Eupora, Mississippi; United States
- Broadcast area: Starkville and east-central Mississippi
- Frequency: 96.1 MHz
- Branding: Lazer 96.1

Programming
- Format: Classic hits

Ownership
- Owner: Stephen C. Davenport; (Telesouth Communications, Inc.)

History
- First air date: September 1, 1978 (as WEXA)
- Former call signs: WKEA (1977–1978); WEXA (1978–1988)

Technical information
- Licensing authority: FCC
- Facility ID: 67652
- Class: C2
- ERP: 40,000 watts
- HAAT: 167 meters (548 ft)

Links
- Public license information: Public file; LMS
- Webcast: Listen Live
- Website: www.lazer961.com

WLZA (96.1 FM is a classic hits radio station whose city of licence is Eupora, Mississippi. WLZA serves Starkville, Columbus, West Point, Mississippi and North-Central Mississippi with an ERP of 40,000 watts. WLZA is owned by Stephen C. Davenport, through licensee Telesouth Communications Inc.

== History ==
WLZA signed on the air September 1, 1978, as WEXA, the sister to WEPA 710 AM. It carried a contemporary rock format as well as Mississippi State University football and local high school sports. The call letters changed to WLZA in 1988.

In 1997, new studios were built for WLZA on Stark Road in Starkville; the station moved in the next year, and WEPA shut down in March 1998. WLZA transitioned to a hot adult contemporary format including the Rick and Bubba Show as well as Sunday worship programming.

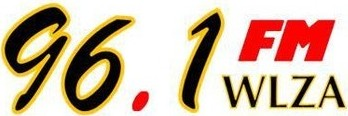
Previous logo

Effective June 21, 2016, Metro Radio sold WLZA to Telesouth Communications, Inc. for $500,000.

On February 17, 2017, WLZA changed their format from hot adult contemporary to classic hits.
