= Choctaw County, Mississippi =

County in Mississippi, United States

- County
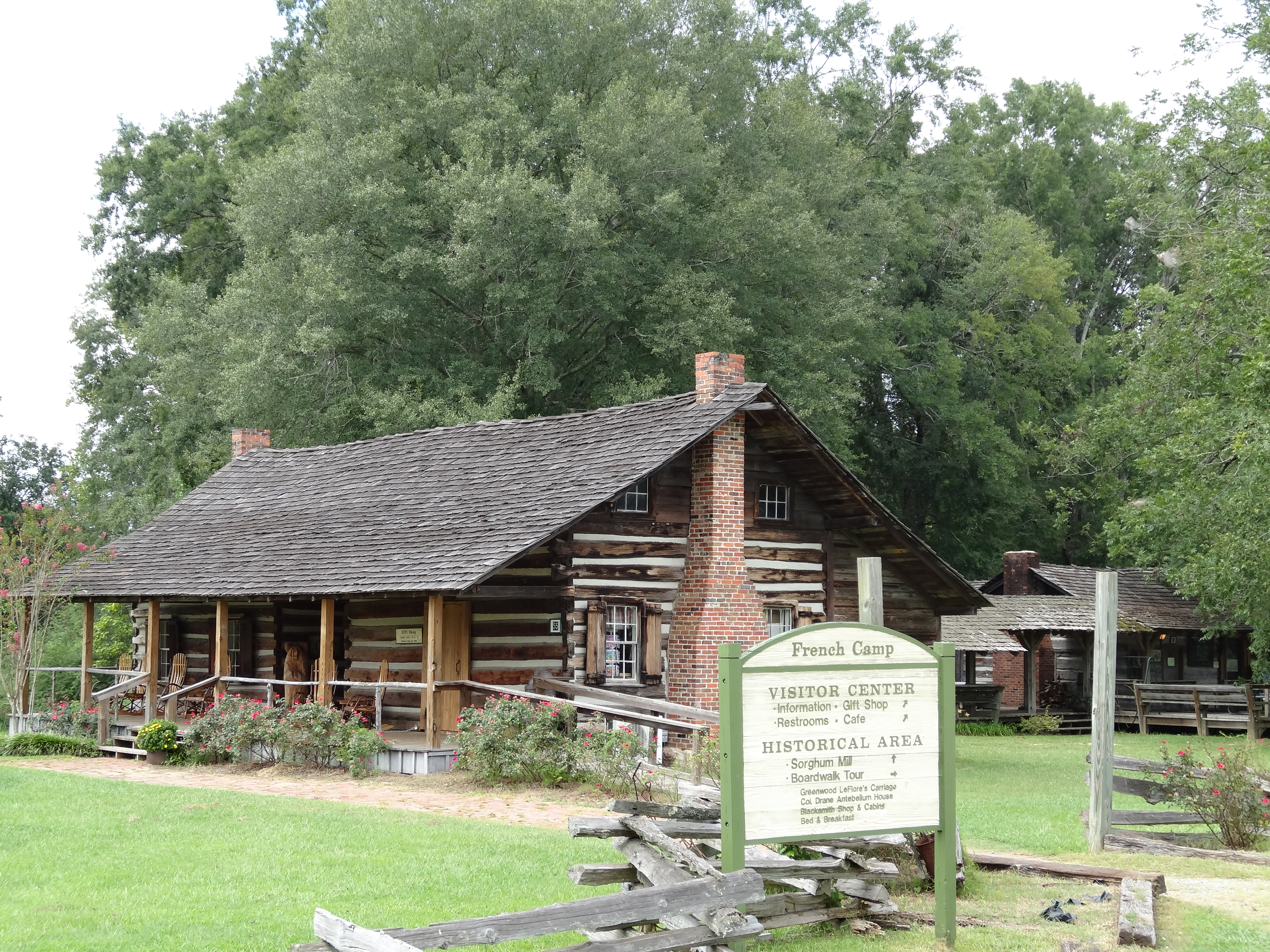
- French Camp. Historic Mississippi cabin.

- Location within the U.S. state of Mississippi
- Coordinates: 33°21′N 89°15′W
- Country: United States
- State: Mississippi
- Founded: 1833
- Named for: Choctaw people
- Seat: Ackerman
- Largest town: Ackerman

Area
  - Total: 420 sq mi (1,100 km^{2})
  - Land: 418 sq mi (1,080 km^{2})
  - Water: 1.7 sq mi (4.4 km^{2}) 0.4%

Population (2020)
  - Total: 8,246
  - Estimate (2025): 8,048 ▼
  - Density: 19.7/sq mi (7.62/km^{2})
- Time zone: UTC−6 (Central)
  - Summer (DST): UTC−5 (CDT)
- Congressional district: 1st
- Website: choctawcountyms.com

Choctaw County is a county located in the central part of the U.S. state of Mississippi. As of the 2020 census, the population was 8,246. Its northern border is the Big Black River, which flows southwest into the Mississippi River south of Vicksburg. The county seat is Ackerman.

The county is named after the Choctaw tribe of Native Americans. They had long occupied this territory as their homeland before European exploration. Under the Indian Removal Act of 1830, they were forced by the United States to cede their lands and to move west of the Mississippi River to what became Indian Territory (today's state of Oklahoma).

== History ==
This was one of the first counties organized in central Mississippi after Indian Removal, and it was originally much larger in geography. As the population increased in the Territory, additional counties were organized. For instance, in 1874 Webster County was formed from some of this county, as were Montgomery and Grenada counties.

The first county seat was Greensboro, which was later assigned to the territory of Webster County and designated as its county seat. Eventually Walthall, Mississippi was designated as the county seat of that county, resulting in the decline and abandonment of Greensboro.

During the American Civil War, many soldiers from the vicinity of Choctaw County began to desert from the Confederate Army after 1863 and return home without permission. Some were principled Unionists opposed to the war who began organized clandestine efforts to undermine local Confederate authority, but others were little more than robbers who formed themselves into bandit gangs and preyed on the civilian population. With several hundred armed men reported to be hiding out in the swamps and forests, cavalry troops of General Nathan Bedford Forrest's Cavalry Corps were dispatched to Bankston in March 1864 to arrest deserters and force them back into army service, but this was only a short term measure that did not resolve the breakdown of Confederate civil authority in the region. In November 1864, Mississippi Governor Charles Clark wrote: "There are more deserters there [Choctaw County] than elsewhere. It is estimated that 500 are in that county." In December, 1864 Union troops under General Benjamin Grierson raided through Choctaw County, and in the spring of 1865 as the Confederacy collapsed local unionists raised the US Flag in Greensboro, the county seat at the time (now located in Webster County).

== Geography ==
According to the U.S. Census Bureau, the county has a total area of 420 square miles (1,100 km^{2}), of which 418 square miles (1,080 km^{2}) is land and 1.7 square miles (4.4 km^{2}) (0.4%) is water. The Big Black River forms the county's northern border.

=== Adjacent counties ===
- Webster County, Mississippi - north
- Oktibbeha County, Mississippi - east
- Winston County, Mississippi - southeast
- Attala County, Mississippi - southwest
- Montgomery County, Mississippi - west

=== National protected areas ===
- Natchez Trace Parkway (part)
- Tombigbee National Forest (part)

== Demographics ==
The adjacent table reflects major decreases in population from 1910 to 1920, and from 1940 to 1960. These were periods of the Great Migration from the South by African Americans, who first moved to jobs in industrial cities in the North and Midwest. In the 1940s and after, they moved to the West Coast for jobs in the rapidly growing defense industry. Farm work declined with mechanization of agriculture. But Black people also migrated to escape the violence and social repression of Mississippi, where they had been essentially disenfranchised since 1890 and lived under Jim Crow laws and the threat of violence; the state had a high rate of lynchings.

Historical population
| Census | Pop. | Note | %± |
|---|---|---|---|
| 1840 | 6,010 | | — |
| 1850 | 11,402 | | 89.7% |
| 1860 | 15,722 | | 37.9% |
| 1870 | 16,988 | | 8.1% |
| 1880 | 9,036 | | −46.8% |
| 1890 | 10,847 | | 20.0% |
| 1900 | 13,036 | | 20.2% |
| 1910 | 14,357 | | 10.1% |
| 1920 | 12,491 | | −13.0% |
| 1930 | 12,339 | | −1.2% |
| 1940 | 13,548 | | 9.8% |
| 1950 | 11,009 | | −18.7% |
| 1960 | 8,423 | | −23.5% |
| 1970 | 8,440 | | 0.2% |
| 1980 | 8,996 | | 6.6% |
| 1990 | 9,071 | | 0.8% |
| 2000 | 9,758 | | 7.6% |
| 2010 | 8,543 | | −12.5% |
| 2020 | 8,246 | | −3.5% |
| 2025 (est.) | 8,048 | ▼ | −2.4% |
U.S. Decennial Census; 1790-1960 1900-1990; 1990-2000 2010-2013

=== 2020 census ===
As of the 2020 census, the county had a population of 8,246. The median age was 44.1 years. 21.8% of residents were under the age of 18 and 22.5% of residents were 65 years of age or older. For every 100 females there were 96.7 males, and for every 100 females age 18 and over there were 92.4 males age 18 and over.

The racial makeup of the county was 67.8% White, 28.4% Black or African American, 0.2% American Indian and Alaska Native, 0.1% Asian, <0.1% Native Hawaiian and Pacific Islander, 0.3% from some other race, and 3.3% from two or more races. Hispanic or Latino residents of any race comprised 1.4% of the population.

<0.1% of residents lived in urban areas, while 100.0% lived in rural areas.

There were 3,454 households in the county, of which 28.0% had children under the age of 18 living in them. Of all households, 43.4% were married-couple households, 21.6% were households with a male householder and no spouse or partner present, and 31.2% were households with a female householder and no spouse or partner present. About 31.6% of all households were made up of individuals and 15.9% had someone living alone who was 65 years of age or older.

There were 4,353 housing units, of which 20.7% were vacant. Among occupied housing units, 74.8% were owner-occupied and 25.2% were renter-occupied. The homeowner vacancy rate was 1.0% and the rental vacancy rate was 15.6%.

=== 2010 census ===
As of the 2010 United States census, there were 8,543 people living in the county. 68.1% were White, 30.2% African American, 0.3% Native American, 0.2% Asian, 0.1% Pacific Islander, 0.1% from some other race and 1.1% of two or more races. 1.4% were Hispanic or Latino of any race.

=== 2000 census ===
As of the census of 2000, there were 9,758 people, 3,686 households, and 2,668 families living in the county. The population density was 23 people per square mile (8.9 people/km^{2}). There were 4,249 housing units at an average density of 10 units per square mile (3.9 units/km^{2}). The racial makeup of the county was 68.03% White, 30.68% Black or African American, 0.31% Native American, 0.13% Asian, 0.01% Pacific Islander, 0.42% from other races, and 0.42% from two or more races. 0.81% of the population were Hispanic or Latino of any race.

There were 3,686 households, out of which 32.60% had children under the age of 18 living with them, 53.30% were married couples living together, 14.60% had a female householder with no husband present, and 27.60% were non-families. 25.00% of all households were made up of individuals, and 12.20% had someone living alone who was 65 years of age or older. The average household size was 2.56 and the average family size was 3.06.

In the county, the population was spread out, with 27.80% under the age of 18, 8.80% from 18 to 24, 24.90% from 25 to 44, 23.50% from 45 to 64, and 15.00% who were 65 years of age or older. The median age was 37 years. For every 100 females there were 91.90 males. For every 100 females age 18 and over, there were 88.40 males.

The median income for a household in the county was $27,020, and the median income for a family was $31,095. Males had a median income of $26,966 versus $17,798 for females. The per capita income for the county was $13,474. About 17.70% of families and 24.70% of the population were below the poverty line, including 33.80% of those under age 18 and 21.30% of those age 65 or over.

== Education ==
=== Primary and secondary schools ===
Choctaw County School District operates public schools, including Choctaw County High School, Ackerman Elementary, French Camp Elementary, and Weir Elementary.

French Camp Academy, which provides in-house private education in grades 7 through 12, is located in French Camp.

=== Colleges and universities ===
Colleges and universities within a 60-mile (97 km) radius of the center of the county include:

- East Mississippi Community College (campuses in Columbus, Mayhew, and Scooba)
- Holmes Community College (campuses in Goodman and Grenada)
- Mississippi State University (Starkville)
- Mississippi University for Women (Columbus)

== Communities ==
=== Towns ===
- Ackerman (county seat)
- French Camp
- Mathiston (mostly in Webster County)
- Weir

=== Unincorporated communities ===
- Bywy
- Chester
- Reform

=== Ghost towns ===
- Bankston
- Pigeon Roost

== Notable people ==
- James Blackwood, American Gospel singer and one of the founding members of legendary Southern Gospel quartet The Blackwood Brothers.
- Turner Catledge, Managing editor of The New York Times from 1952 to 1964 and the paper's first executive editor.
- David A. Chandler, Former Associate Justice of the Supreme Court of Mississippi.
- James Plemon "J.P." Coleman 52nd Governor of Mississippi and a United States Circuit Judge of the United States Court of Appeals for the Fifth Circuit.
- Thomas Fulton, Former conductor of the New York Metropolitan Opera
- Dennis Johnson Fullback for Mississippi State University who played for the New York Giants and Buffalo Bills in the NFL.
- Kenneth Johnson, NFL defensive back for the Green Bay Packers
- Tony Kimbrough, Former professional football quarterback
- Raymond Edwin "Ray" Mabus Jr., 60th Governor of Mississippi and 75th United States Secretary of the Navy.
- Hoyt Ming, old-time fiddler.
- Alvin McKinley, NFL defensive tackle who played for the Carolina Panthers, Cleveland Browns, Denver Broncos and New Orleans Saints.
- Roy Oswalt, former Major League Baseball pitcher
- Cheryl Prewitt, Miss America 1980 and Miss Mississippi 1979

== In popular culture ==
The song "Choctaw County Affair" from Carrie Underwood's 2015 album Storyteller is set in Choctaw County, Mississippi.

== Politics ==
United States presidential election results for Choctaw County, Mississippi
| Year | Republican | | Democratic | | Third party(ies) | |
| Year | No. | % | No. | % | No. | % |
|---|---|---|---|---|---|---|
| 1912 | 24 | 3.53% | 609 | 89.69% | 46 | 6.77% |
| 1916 | 53 | 5.56% | 873 | 91.51% | 28 | 2.94% |
| 1920 | 191 | 19.41% | 779 | 79.17% | 14 | 1.42% |
| 1924 | 98 | 7.44% | 1,219 | 92.56% | 0 | 0.00% |
| 1928 | 118 | 10.48% | 1,008 | 89.52% | 0 | 0.00% |
| 1932 | 23 | 2.03% | 1,110 | 97.88% | 1 | 0.09% |
| 1936 | 41 | 2.96% | 1,342 | 96.83% | 3 | 0.22% |
| 1940 | 66 | 5.16% | 1,212 | 94.84% | 0 | 0.00% |
| 1944 | 76 | 6.36% | 1,119 | 93.64% | 0 | 0.00% |
| 1948 | 43 | 3.34% | 131 | 10.19% | 1,112 | 86.47% |
| 1952 | 524 | 27.42% | 1,387 | 72.58% | 0 | 0.00% |
| 1956 | 221 | 15.74% | 1,117 | 79.56% | 66 | 4.70% |
| 1960 | 245 | 14.88% | 817 | 49.64% | 584 | 35.48% |
| 1964 | 2,096 | 93.32% | 150 | 6.68% | 0 | 0.00% |
| 1968 | 211 | 6.65% | 417 | 13.15% | 2,543 | 80.20% |
| 1972 | 2,301 | 86.57% | 326 | 12.26% | 31 | 1.17% |
| 1976 | 1,561 | 49.23% | 1,520 | 47.93% | 90 | 2.84% |
| 1980 | 1,927 | 52.15% | 1,729 | 46.79% | 39 | 1.06% |
| 1984 | 2,491 | 68.00% | 1,166 | 31.83% | 6 | 0.16% |
| 1988 | 2,297 | 62.98% | 1,335 | 36.61% | 15 | 0.41% |
| 1992 | 2,026 | 53.77% | 1,435 | 38.08% | 307 | 8.15% |
| 1996 | 1,715 | 53.15% | 1,247 | 38.64% | 265 | 8.21% |
| 2000 | 2,398 | 64.48% | 1,278 | 34.36% | 43 | 1.16% |
| 2004 | 2,694 | 66.00% | 1,366 | 33.46% | 22 | 0.54% |
| 2008 | 2,624 | 63.57% | 1,459 | 35.34% | 45 | 1.09% |
| 2012 | 2,812 | 65.81% | 1,428 | 33.42% | 33 | 0.77% |
| 2016 | 2,788 | 68.59% | 1,218 | 29.96% | 59 | 1.45% |
| 2020 | 3,001 | 71.06% | 1,185 | 28.06% | 37 | 0.88% |
| 2024 | 2,881 | 74.06% | 965 | 24.81% | 44 | 1.13% |

John F. Kennedy is the last Democrat to win Choctaw County despite the fact that there is not one Catholic parish located in the county.

== See also ==
- National Register of Historic Places listings in Choctaw County, Mississippi
