= French Camp Academy =

Coordinates: 33.289827°N 89.400288°W

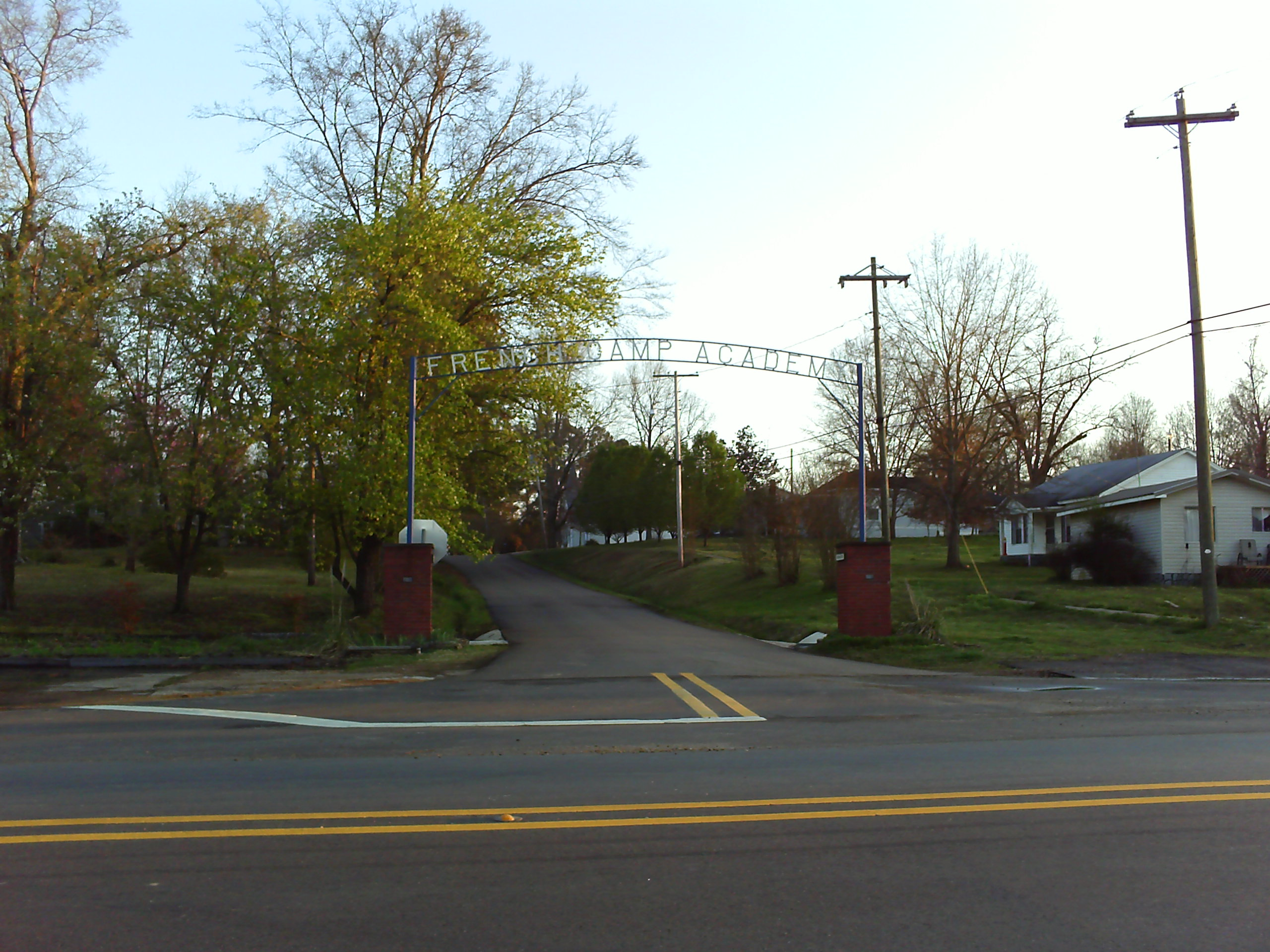

Information
- Former names: Central Mississippi Institute for Girls (1885-1915); The French Camp Academy for Boys (1885-1915)
- Religious affiliation: Christianity
- Established: 1885; 141 years ago
- Gender: Mixed (boys and girls educated separately until 1915)

French Camp Academy (FCA) is an interdenominational Christian boarding school located in French Camp, Mississippi. It is dedicated to supporting children and teenagers who may lack access to the opportunities and resources they need in their home or peer environments. In addition to serving residential students, FCA also provides an accredited Christian education for local students in grades 7-12. FCA operates several community-focused businesses that provide opportunities for students to learn practical work skills, earn academic credit and income, which includes a bed and breakfast, a gift shop, a restaurant, radio station, and observatory.

== History ==
In 1885, a group of Scotch-Irish Christians affiliated with the local Presbyterian Church founded the Central Mississippi Institute for Girls in French Camp. Later that same year, the French Camp Academy for Boys was established. Following a devastating fire in 1915 that destroyed the girls' school, the two institutions merged to form what is now known as French Camp Academy. In 1950, the academy was reorganized under a board of trustees representing a variety of Christian denominations, reflecting its interdenominational mission.

== Location and composition ==
French Camp Academy is in French Camp, a community in central Mississippi, 80 miles (130 km) south of Tupelo and 90 miles (140 km) north of Jackson. The school has a total of 900 acres (360 ha) of land.

== Education ==
Residents of French Camp Academy in Grades K-6 attend a public school, French Camp Elementary School of the Choctaw County School District. Local students interested in a private school education in grades 7 - 12 can attend French Camp Academy.

Students are required to wear school uniforms, similar to many private and public schools today. High school students may attend a vocational technology program in the Choctaw Vocational Center in Ackerman or enroll in FCA's vocational program that has a strong emphasis in the welding arts.

== Support Ministries ==
French Camp operates the Council House Café, a full-service restaurant in a new facility built in 2019. The original restaurant sits next to door, which is a 17-foot (5.2 m) by 17-foot (5.2 m) log cabin that was built in 1820 and once served as a meeting place for Greenwood LeFlore. The school received the original building as a donation in 1967. As part of a bicentennial project of students and staff, the log cabin was restored. The Council House serves sandwiches, blue plate specials, steaks, hamburgers, salads, soups, bread pudding, and Mississippi mud pie. The school uses the restaurant as a training area for students, and the profits from the restaurant fund scholarships for students.

French Camp operates a bed and breakfast . In 1986 the school moved two clerestory log cabins from Eupora, Mississippi, to French Camp. The cabins, which had been constructed between 1840 and 1860, were placed together and the school established an addition between the cabins. The addition was designed to have the same historic appearance that the original cabins have. The B&B opened in March 1987. In 1990 the school restored an additional cottage, named the B & B Jr., and placed it behind the main building. The Carriage House is a building of newer construction which sits on the former location of an 1880s cabin. Another cabin, the Burford Cabin, is the most newly opened accommodation building within the bed and breakfast. The Buford Cabin is accessible for handicapped people. The main building can accommodate up to eight people. The B & B Jr. can accommodate up to six people, the Burford Cabin can house up to four people, and the Carriage House can accommodate up to six people.

The school hosts the Rainwater Observatory and Planetarium, the largest amateur observatory in Mississippi. The observatory, with over 20 telescopes, has a clear view of the night sky thanks to limited light pollution. The observatory provides a free public event the 2nd Friday night of each month at 7 PM and is open by appointment to private groups wanting an immersive astronomy experience.

== WFCA ==
French Camp Academy hosts the WFCA radio station, a non-profit radio station with its studios located along the Natchez Trace Parkway at Mile Marker 181. H. Richard Cannon, president of the school, conceived of the idea of the radio station while taking a mission field trip in New Guinea.

== Festivals ==
The French Camp Community Club sponsors an annual Harvest Festival, held annually every second Saturday of October. Proceeds to supporting the French Camp Community Club and French Camp Academy.

== Demographics ==
As of 2022 the school served close to 300 students in its home and academic programs. As of 2011 about 300 children and adults live and work on the campus.

== See also ==
- Rainwater Observatory and Planetarium
