= Rainwater Observatory and Planetarium =

Observatory in Mississippi, US

- Organization: French Camp Academy
- Location: French Camp, Mississippi, United States
- Coordinates: 33°17′14.1″N 89°23′06.5″W
- Website: www.rainwaterobservatory.org

Telescopes
- Unnamed Telescope: 32-inch reflector

Rainwater Observatory and Planetarium is an educational astronomical observatory and Planetarium run as an educational ministry of French Camp Academy. It is located near French Camp, Mississippi, United States. It is the largest observatory in Mississippi with 16+ telescopes, with the largest instruments including a 32-inch Dobsonian telescope and 14-inch Celestron catadioptric telescope. Rainwater is currently awaiting delivery of the Sollee Telescope, a 25-inch research-grade telescope. When installed in the two-story observatory building already constructed in the observatory complex, the Sollee Telescope will be suitable for serious astronomical studies, in the last remaining "dark spot" in Mississippi on the U.S. Dark Skies photograph.

Rainwater Observatory and Planetarium is the site for the annual Midsouth Star Gaze. This gathering of amateur astronomers is held in late March or early April each year on the weekend closest to New Moon (to allow for the maximum night-time observing for deep-sky objects such as galaxies and nebulae). The planetarium/activities complex includes one main building with a 30-foot dome and Spitz planetarium projector, combined with a computer/activities room. A meeting room and exhibition space building next door includes dormitory space and male/female group bathrooms with showers. Up the hill from the activity buildings is the cluster of observatory buildings for all the reflector, refractor, and catadioptric telescopes. Various astronomical exhibits such as markers showing the arrangement of the Stonehenge standing stones with their annual rise and set points, a multitude of sundials, and a walking trail that demonstrates the relative distances between the Sun and all its planets, cover the distance between the activities complex and the hilltop cluster of observatory buildings.

Rainwater Observatory has a video astronomy van for astronomy education outreach. This consists of large LCD monitors which can present both objects visible in the van's telescope plus PowerPoint presentations describing what the telescope is pointed to. The video astronomy van is available for visits within approximately a 100-mile radius of French Camp.

== See also ==
- List of astronomical observatories
- List of planetariums
