= Reform, Mississippi =

- Unincorporated community
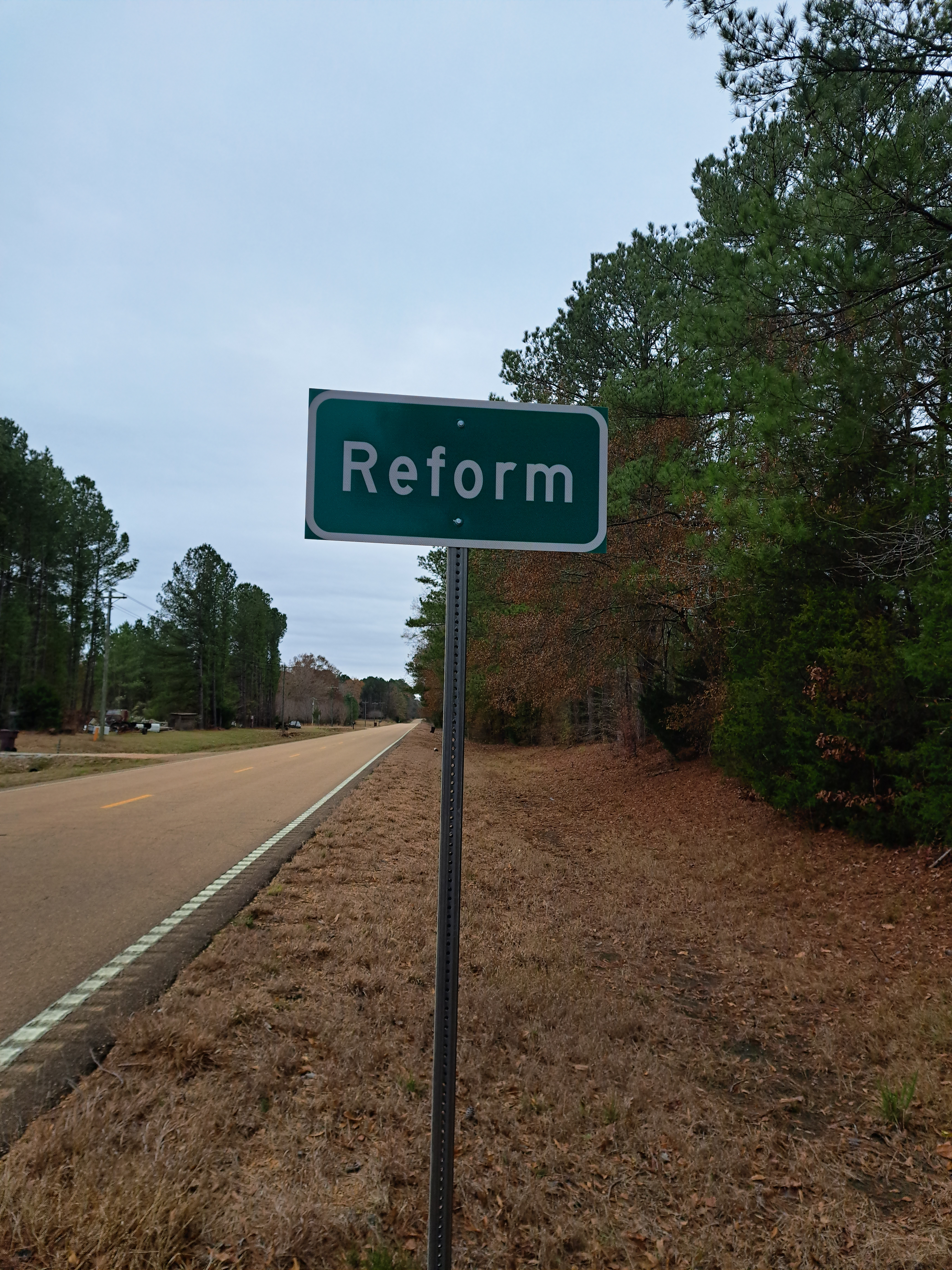
- Highway Sign outside of Reform

- Location within Mississippi Location within the United States
- Coordinates: 33°25′50″N 89°09′17″W
- Country: United States
- State: Mississippi
- County: Choctaw
- Elevation: 427 ft (130 m)
- Time zone: UTC-6 (Central (CST))
  - Summer (DST): UTC-5 (CDT)
- ZIP code: 39735
- Area code: 662
- GNIS feature ID: 676586

Reform is an unincorporated community located in Choctaw County, Mississippi, United States, along Mississippi Highway 15 and is approximately 6 miles (9.7 km) south of Mathiston.

== History ==
Reform was first established in 1887 and is located on the former Gulf, Mobile and Ohio Railroad. At one point, Reform was home to three general stores. It was also once serviced by a cotton gin and saw mill.

A post office first began operation under the name Reform in 1888.

Lignite was once mined for local use near Reform.
