= Derrick Jones (cornerback) =

American football player (born 1994)

No. 6 – Albany Firebirds
- Position: Cornerback
- Roster status: Active

Personal information
- Born: December 4, 1994 (age 31); Eupora, Mississippi, U.S.
- Listed height: 6 ft 2 in (1.88 m)
- Listed weight: 188 lb (85 kg)

Career information
- High school: Eupora
- College: Ole Miss
- NFL draft: 2017: 6th round, 204th overall pick

Career history
- New York Jets (2017–2018); Green Bay Packers (2019)*; Houston Texans (2019)*; Seattle Dragons (2020)*; Team 9 (2020)*; Seattle Dragons (2020); Calgary Stampeders (2022)*; New Orleans Breakers (2022–2023); Frisco Fighters (2023); Vegas Knight Hawks (2024); Albany Firebirds (2025–present)
- * Offseason or practice squad member only
- Stats at Pro Football Reference

Derrick Jones (born December 4, 1994) is an American football cornerback for the Albany Firebirds of Arena Football One. He played college football at Ole Miss. He was selected by the New York Jets in the sixth round of the 2017 NFL draft.

== College career ==
Coming in to the Ole Miss Rebels football program as a three-star wide receiver, Jones switched to cornerback his freshman year and started four games. He then split his time at the two positions over his sophomore and junior seasons, playing sparingly at corner but working his way up to starting wide receiver junior year. However, Jones switched back to corner for his senior season. At the start of his senior year, Jones was suspended three games for violating the Rebels' conduct standards. In 2016, Jones took his first interception for a touchdown.

== Professional career ==
Pre-draft measurables
Height	Weight	Arm length	Hand span	Wingspan	40-yard dash	10-yard split	20-yard split	20-yard shuttle	Three-cone drill	Vertical jump	Broad jump	Bench press
6 ft 1 7/8 in (1.88 m)	189 lb (86 kg)	32 7/8 in (0.84 m)	9 1/4 in (0.23 m)	6 ft 6 1/8 in (1.98 m)	4.48 s	1.61 s	2.58 s	4.41 s	7.03 s	41.0 in (1.04 m)	11 ft 8 in (3.56 m)	9 reps
All values from Pro Day

=== New York Jets ===
Jones was selected by the New York Jets in the sixth round, 204th overall, in the 2017 NFL draft.

On August 10, 2019, Jones was waived by the Jets.

=== Green Bay Packers ===
On August 11, 2019, Jones was claimed off waivers by the Green Bay Packers, but was waived two days later after failing his physical.

=== Houston Texans ===
On August 19, 2019, Jones was signed by the Houston Texans. He was waived with an injury settlement on August 26.

=== Seattle Dragons ===
Jones signed with the Seattle Dragons of the XFL on January 14, 2020. He was waived during final roster cuts on January 22, 2020. Jones was signed to the XFL's practice squad team, referred to as Team 9, on January 30, 2020. He was re-signed by the Dragons on February 25, 2020. He had his contract terminated when the league suspended operations on April 10, 2020.

=== Calgary Stampeders ===
In early 2022, Jones signed a futures contract with the Calgary Stampeders of the Canadian Football League (CFL). After registering to play in the United States Football League (USFL) he was released by the Stampeders on April 8.

=== New Orleans Breakers ===
While still under contract with the Stampeders Jones then signed a separate contract with the USFL and entered the 2022 USFL draft, where he was drafted as a cornerback by the New Orleans Breakers, without informing the USFL of his contract with the Stampeders. On February 23, 2022, Jones denied he had made a commitment to the Stampeders. He was released by the Breakers on April 1, 2022. He re-signed with the Breakers on April 14, and was transferred to the team's practice squad before the start of the regular season on April 16, 2022. He was transferred to the active roster on April 22.

Jones was released on April 19, 2023.
