= Webster County School District (Mississippi) =

School district in Mississippi

Address
- 95 Clark Avenue Eupora, Webster County, Mississippi; United States

District information
- Grades: PreK - 12
- Schools: 5

Students and staff
- Students: 1,750
- Teachers: 134.44 FTE
- Student–teacher ratio: 13.02:1

Other information
- Website: www.webstercountyschools.org

The Webster County School District is a public school district based in Eupora, Mississippi (USA). The district's boundaries parallel that of Webster County.

== Schools ==
=== Secondary schools (Grades 9-12) ===
- Webster County Career and Technology Center

Secondary schools (Grades 7–12)

- East Webster High School (Cumberland)
- Eupora High School (Eupora)

Elementary schools (Grades K–6)

- East Webster Elementary School (Mathiston)
- Eupora Elementary School (Eupora)

== Demographics ==
=== 2006–07 school year ===
There were a total of 1,827 students enrolled in the Webster County School District during the 2006–2007 school year. The gender makeup of the district was 48% female and 52% male. The racial makeup of the district was 27.59% African American, 70.77% White, 1.20% Hispanic, 0.33% Asian, and 0.11% Native American. 44.1% of the district's students were eligible to receive free lunch.

=== Previous school years ===
School Year	Enrollment	Gender Makeup		Racial Makeup				
School Year	Enrollment	Female	Male	Asian	African American	Hispanic	Native American	White
2005–06	1,874	47%	53%	0.32%	27.69%	1.39%	0.05%	70.54%
2004–05	1,846	48%	52%	0.27%	27.41%	1.35%	–	70.96%
2003–04	1,880	48%	52%	0.32%	27.93%	1.44%	0.05%	70.27%
2002–03	1,873	48%	52%	–	30.11%	0.91%	–	68.98%

== Accountability statistics ==
	2006–07	2005–06	2004–05	2003–04	2002–03
District Accreditation Status	Accredited	Accredited	Accredited	Accredited	Accredited
School Performance Classifications
Level 5 (Superior Performing) Schools	0	2	1	1	0
Level 4 (Exemplary) Schools	3	1	2	2	1
Level 3 (Successful) Schools	1	1	1	1	3
Level 2 (Under Performing) Schools	0	0	0	0	0
Level 1 (Low Performing) Schools	0	0	0	0	0
Not Assigned	0	0	0	0	0

== Notable alumni ==
- Johnthan Banks, NFL cornerback, East Webster High School
- Derrick Jones, NFL cornerback Eupora High School

== See also ==
- List of school districts in Mississippi
- The Webster County School District is a public school system operating across five primary instructional facilities in Webster County, Mississippi, with its administrative headquarters located in Eupora. Categorized as a rural, remote district by the National Center for Education Statistics (NCES), it serves an enrollment of approximately 1,700 students spanning pre-kindergarten through twelfth grade. Under the monitoring of the Mississippi Statewide Accountability System, the district is evaluated across core academic criteria, including graduation rates and mathematics and science proficiency benchmarks.
