= Ackerman, Mississippi =

- Town
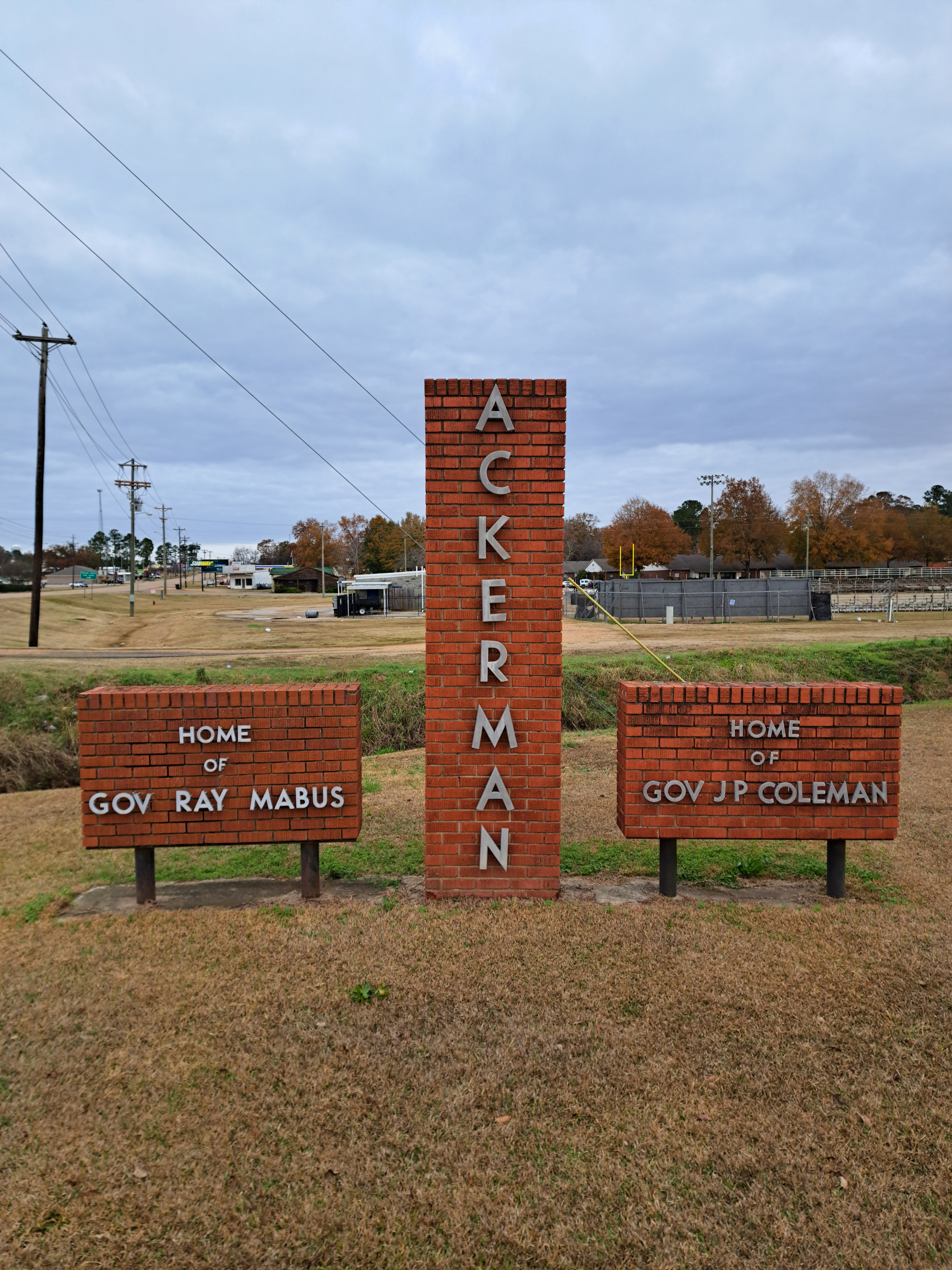
- Signs in Ackerman

- Location of Ackerman, Mississippi
- Coordinates: 33°18′41″N 89°10′29″W
- Country: United States
- State: Mississippi
- County: Choctaw

Area
  - Total: 2.27 sq mi (5.87 km^{2})
  - Land: 2.25 sq mi (5.82 km^{2})
  - Water: 0.019 sq mi (0.05 km^{2})
- Elevation: 522 ft (159 m)

Population (2020)
  - Total: 1,594
  - Density: 709.0/sq mi (273.75/km^{2})
- Time zone: UTC-6 (Central (CST))
  - Summer (DST): UTC-5 (CDT)
- ZIP code: 39735
- Area code: 662
- FIPS code: 28-00300
- GNIS feature ID: 0692374
- Website: www.townofackerman.com

Ackerman is a town and the county seat of Choctaw County, Mississippi, United States. The population was 1,594 according to 2020 census, which shows an increase from 1,510 reported in the 2010 census.

== History ==
It is named for William K. Ackerman, President of the Illinois Central Railroad 1877-1883.

== Geography ==
Ackerman is located in southeast of the present-day center of Choctaw County. Mississippi Highway 15 passes through the town, leading north 16 miles (26 km) to Mathiston and south 15 miles (24 km) to Louisville, Mississippi (pronounced Lewis-ville).

Mississippi Highway 12 passes through the northwest corner of the town, leading northeast 24 miles (39 km) to Starkville, where Mississippi State University is located and southwest 31 miles (50 km) to Kosciusko. Mississippi Highway 9 heads north from Highway 12 in the northwest corner of Ackerman, leading 17 miles (27 km) to Eupora.

According to the United States Census Bureau, the town has a total area of 2.27 square miles (5.87 km^{2}), of which 2.25 square miles (5.82 km^{2}) is land and 0.02 square miles (0.05 km^{2}), or 0.85%, is water. The town is located near the headwaters of the Yockanookany River, a tributary of the Pearl River.

=== Climate ===
Climate data for Ackerman, Mississippi (1981–2010 normals)
Month	Jan	Feb	Mar	Apr	May	Jun	Jul	Aug	Sep	Oct	Nov	Dec	Year
Average precipitation inches (mm)	4.93 (125)	5.04 (128)	4.82 (122)	4.95 (126)	4.61 (117)	4.29 (109)	3.98 (101)	3.74 (95)	3.41 (87)	4.28 (109)	4.65 (118)	5.37 (136)	54.07 (1,373)
Average precipitation days (≥ 0.01 in)	8.7	8.7	8.5	7.6	8.6	8.2	8.5	7.5	6.2	5.8	7.9	9.0	95.2
Source: NOAA

== Demographics ==
Historical population
Census	Pop.	Note	%±
1900	706		—
1910	1,398		98.0%
1920	1,264		−9.6%
1930	1,169		−7.5%
1940	1,528		30.7%
1950	1,463		−4.3%
1960	1,382		−5.5%
1970	1,502		8.7%
1980	1,567		4.3%
1990	1,573		0.4%
2000	1,696		7.8%
2010	1,510		−11.0%
2020	1,594		5.6%
U.S. Decennial Census

=== 2020 census ===
As of the 2020 census, Ackerman had a population of 1,594. The median age was 40.0 years. 24.1% of residents were under the age of 18 and 20.4% were 65 years of age or older. For every 100 females, there were 82.8 males, and for every 100 females age 18 and over, there were 76.6 males age 18 and over.

0.0% of residents lived in urban areas, while 100.0% lived in rural areas.

There were 655 households in Ackerman, including 345 family households. Of all households, 32.5% had children under the age of 18 living in them, 31.1% were married-couple households, 19.7% were households with a male householder and no spouse or partner present, and 44.0% were households with a female householder and no spouse or partner present. About 36.8% of all households were made up of individuals, and 17.5% had someone living alone who was 65 years of age or older.

There were 742 housing units, of which 11.7% were vacant. The homeowner vacancy rate was 1.1% and the rental vacancy rate was 7.6%.

Ackerman racial composition
Race	Num.	Perc.
White (non-Hispanic)	833	52.26%
Black or African American (non-Hispanic)	668	41.91%
Native American	4	0.25%
Other/Mixed	64	4.02%
Hispanic or Latino	25	1.57%

=== 2000 census ===
As of the census of 2000, there were 1,696 people, 711 households, and 430 families residing in the town. The population density was 752.7 inhabitants per square mile (290.6/km^{2}). There were 781 housing units at an average density of 346.6 per square mile (133.8/km^{2}). The racial makeup of the town was 62.97% White, 34.85% African American, 0.24% Native American, 0.59% Asian, 0.94% from other races, and 0.41% from two or more races. Hispanic or Latino of any race were 1.47% of the population.

There were 711 households, out of which 29.4% had children under the age of 18 living with them, 38.8% were married couples living together, 17.4% had a female householder with no husband present, and 39.5% were non-families. 37.0% of all households were made up of individuals, and 16.7% had someone living alone who was 65 years of age or older. The average household size was 2.27 and the average family size was 3.00.

In the town, the population was spread out, with 24.6% under the age of 18, 7.8% from 18 to 24, 25.8% from 25 to 44, 21.6% from 45 to 64, and 20.2% who were 65 years of age or older. The median age was 39 years. For every 100 females, there were 81.8 males. For every 100 females age 18 and over, there were 76.0 males.

The median income for a household in the town was $21,287, and the median income for a family was $30,511. Males had a median income of $30,588 versus $20,739 for females. The per capita income for the town was $13,486. About 17.8% of families and 24.7% of the population were below the poverty line, including 33.2% of those under age 18 and 20.1% of those age 65 or over.

== Education ==
Ackerman is served by the Choctaw County School District.

== Notable people ==
- Ja'Marcus Bradley, professional football player
- The Blackwood Brothers, gospel quartet
- Texas Johnny Brown, blues guitarist, songwriter, and singer
- Turner Catledge (1901—1983), managing editor of the New York Times
- James P. Coleman, governor of Mississippi (1956–1960)
- Josiah D. Coleman, Justice of the Supreme Court of Mississippi and grandson of James P. Coleman
- Joey Hood, member of the Mississippi House of Representatives
- Ray Mabus, governor of Mississippi (1988–1992)
- Coby Miller, Olympic sprinter
- Cheryl Prewitt, Miss America, 1980
