= Embry, Mississippi =

- Unincorporated community
- Location within Mississippi Location within the United States
- Coordinates: 33°39′22″N 89°22′08″W
- Country: United States
- State: Mississippi
- County: Webster
- Elevation: 335 ft (102 m)
- Time zone: UTC-6 (Central (CST))
  - Summer (DST): UTC-5 (CDT)
- Area code: 662
- GNIS feature ID: 691840

Embry (also Gasville) is an unincorporated community in Webster County, Mississippi, United States.

== Notable person ==
United States Senator Thomas Gore of Oklahoma (1870–1949) was born near Embry.
