= Choctaw County School District =

School district in Mississippi, US

Address
- 19 East Main Street Ackerman, Mississippi, 39735; United States

District information
- Type: Public
- Grades: PreK–12
- NCES District ID: 2800990

Students and staff
- Students: 1,201
- Teachers: 118.13 (FTE)
- Staff: 132.51 (FTE)
- Student–teacher ratio: 10.17

Other information
- Website: choctaw.k12.ms.us

The Choctaw County School District is a public school district based in Ackerman, Mississippi, United States.

The district's boundaries parallel that of Choctaw County.

== Schools ==
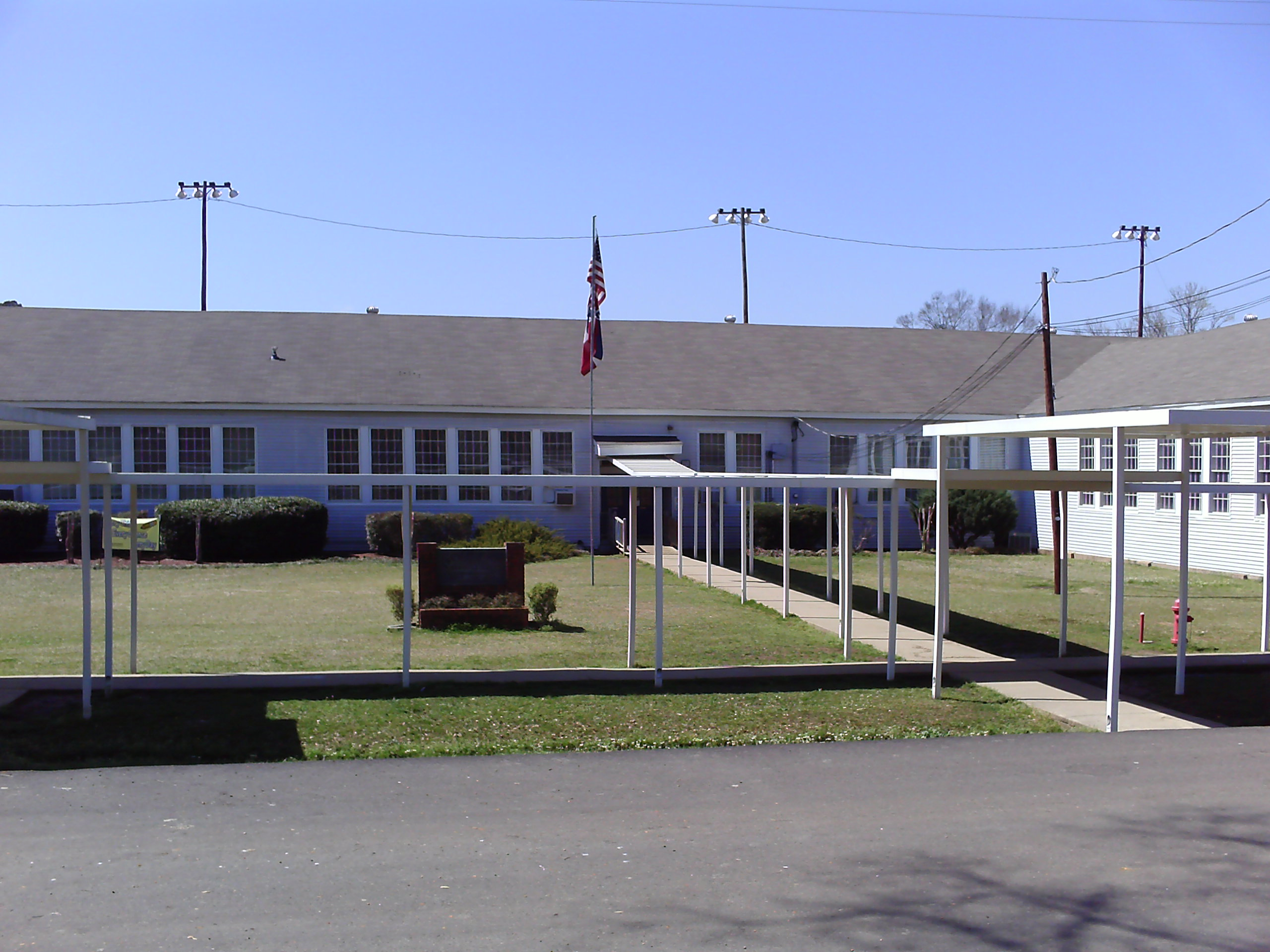
French Camp Elementary School

- Choctaw County High School (Choctaw County, Grades 7-12)
- Choctaw County Elementary School (Choctaw County, Grades PK-6)
- French Camp Elementary School (French Camp, Grades PK-8)
  - Children at the French Camp Academy in grades Kindergarten through 8 attend French Camp Elementary School.
- Weir Attendance Center (Weir, Grades PK-12)
  - French Camp Academy students in grades 7 through 8 may attend the school's technology preparatory program. 7th grade students may take career discovery courses, and 8th grade students may take computer discovery courses.

== Demographics ==
=== 2006-07 school year ===
There were a total of 1,712 students enrolled in the Choctaw County School District during the 2006–2007 school year. The gender makeup of the district was 49% female and 51% male. The racial makeup of the district was 36.80% African American, 62.15% White, 0.58% Hispanic, 0.29% Asian, and 0.18% Native American. 54.9% of the district's students were eligible to receive free lunch.

=== Previous school years ===
School Year	Enrollment	Gender Makeup		Racial Makeup				
School Year	Enrollment	Female	Male	Asian	African American	Hispanic	Native American	White
2005-06	1,763	49%	51%	0.28%	38.17%	0.57%	0.17%	60.81%
2004-05	1,820	49%	51%	0.11%	38.41%	0.93%	0.22%	60.33%
2003-04	1,787	50%	50%	0.22%	40.46%	0.62%	0.28%	58.42%
2002-03	1,863	49%	51%	0.16%	41.33%	1.29%	0.27%	56.95%

== Accountability statistics ==
	2006-07	2005-06	2004-05	2003-04	2002-03
District Accreditation Status	Accredited	Accredited	Accredited	Accredited	Accredited
School Performance Classifications
Level 5 (Superior Performing) Schools	1	1	1	1	1
Level 4 (Exemplary) Schools	1	0	1	1	1
Level 3 (Successful) Schools	2	3	1	2	2
Level 2 (Under Performing) Schools	0	0	1	0	0
Level 1 (Low Performing) Schools	0	0	0	0	0
Not Assigned	0	0	0	0	0

== See also ==
- List of school districts in Mississippi
