= Wood Junior College =

Private college in Mathiston, Mississippi

- Former names: Woodland Seminary (1886–1889); Woodland Academy (1889–c. 1900); Bennett Academy (c. 1900–1927); Bennett Junior College (1927–1935)
- Type: Private
- Active: 1886–2003
- Religious affiliation: Methodist Episcopal Church, South
- Location: Mathiston, Mississippi, United States
- Campus: 400 acres (160 ha); Rural

Wood Junior College was an American two-year private college in Mathiston, Mississippi. It was accredited by the Southern Association of Colleges and Schools. It opened in 1886 as Woodland Seminary. It became Wood Junior College in 1936. The college closed in 2003.

== History ==
Wood Junior College originated in 1886 by two Methodist Episcopal ministers as Woodland Seminary in Clarkson, Mississippi. This was an elementary school for boys that was funded by gifts to the Freeman's Aid Society by Northern churches. It was renamed Woodland Academy in 1889.

The Woman's Home Missionary Society of the Methodist Episcopal Church took control of the school in 1897, renting the school's property from the Freeman's Aid Society for $1 and year. Under this new administration, the school became coeducational and added an industrial school for girls.

The Woman's Home Missionary Society purchased land and built a new school building, changing the institution's name to Bennett Academy around 1900.

A fire in 1912 destroyed the campus's main building. Bennett Academy moved to Mathiston, Mississippi in 1914 for better access to railroad transportation. The citizens of Mathiston donated $5,000 and 43 acres for the new campus. The new campus included Bennett Academy, Dickenson Industrial Home for Girls, and the Irving and Florence Wood Home for Boys. Because Mississippi had no compulsory educational laws until 1918, Bennett Academy was designed to be a model for the state's public schools; the campus was visited by state officials in 1916.

In 1924, the academy transitioned into a two-year college under the leadership of president Dr. Jasper Weber, with the addition of college-level classes and the gradual removal of its lower grades. Its name was changed to Bennett Junior College in 1927 and first opened as a junior college in 1928. Bennett Junior College was accredited by the Southern Association of Colleges and Schools in 1932.

In November 1935, Bennett Junior College became Wood Junior College, and all high school classes were discontinued. The name Wood was chosen to honor Dr. and Mrs. Irving C. Wood of Omaha, Nebraska, who had made significant capital donations in 1913 and 1935. Wood Junior College was residential, with around 250 students. It was an independent college, although it served "in the tradition of Methodist higher education". Its board of trustees included five representatives from the Mississippi Conference of The United Methodist Church.

The college began to have financial difficulties and lost its accreditation with the Southern Association of Colleges and Schools in March 2002. As a result, student enrollment at the college declined, and fewer classes were offered. The college closed after the spring 2003 semester.

The Mississippi Conference of The United Methodist Church repurposed the campus as the Wood Institute, a conference and retreat center. The Wood Institute closed on June 30, 2008.

== Campus ==
Wood Junior College's campus included 400 acres in Mathiston, Mississippi. Its 22 buildings included an auditorium, dormitories, and a gym.

=== Wood Hall ===
The oldest surviving structure is Wood Hall that was built in 1914 and is listed on the National Register of Historic Places. Wood Hall was the main building of the college and included classrooms, a dining hall, dormitories, a library, and a student union. The dining hall seated 300 students.

=== Other buildings ===
The campus also included the Cathedral of the Pines, which was built in 1955 and seated 400 people. Miller Hall was a dormitory for women, built in 1936. Added in 1966, the Science Hall included three lecture halls and three laboratories. Bennett Hall was an auditorium and classroom building, added in 1966. The campus also include Barn Theatre.

== Academics ==
Wood Junior College offered an Associate in Arts degree in agriculture, business education, elementary teaching, and secretarial training. Majors for transfer students included business, engineering, home economics, the liberal arts, music, pre-medicine, pre-ministry, pre-nursing, religion, science, and teaching.

Wood Junior College was accredited by the Mississippi State College Association and the Southern Association of Colleges and Schools.

== Student life ==
Wood Junior College students published a weekly newspaper called The Breeze. The junior college had a Dramatic Club that performed plays for the general public. The college had a chapter of Delta Psi Omega, a national theatre honor society. The junior college also had a debate team that competed with the state college.

== Notable alumni ==
Alumni of Bennett Academy and Wood Junior College include two Supreme Court of Mississippi justices, a vice chancellor of a state university, and various state politicians.

- Lester C. Franklin, Mississippi State Senate

== See also ==
- List of junior colleges in the United States
- National Register of Historic Places listings in Webster County, Mississippi
