= Webster County, Mississippi =

County in Mississippi, United States

- County
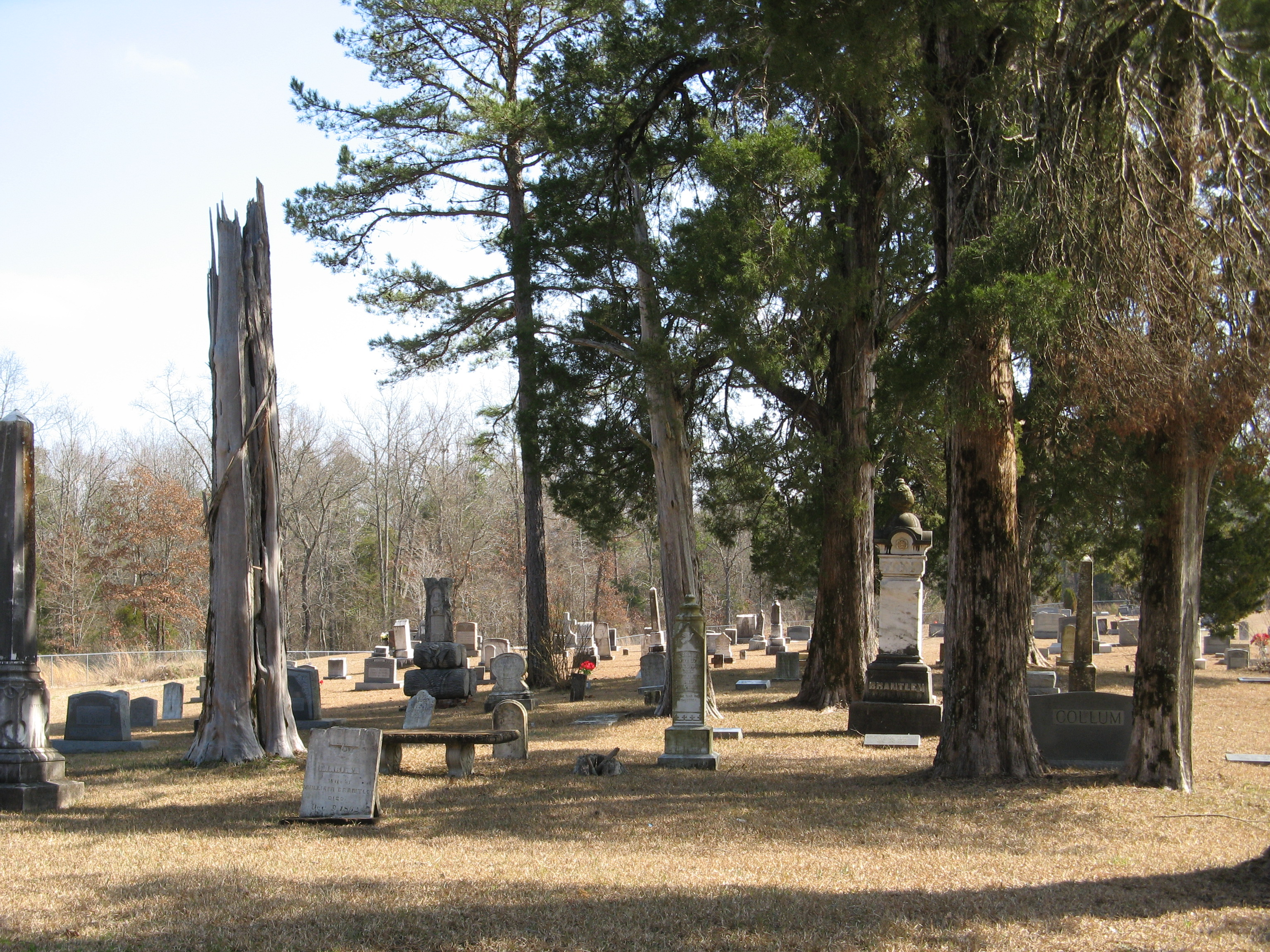
- Cemetery of Greensboro Baptist Church in Webster County. The large white marble tombstone marks the grave of William F. Brantley, General, C.S.A.

- Location within the U.S. state of Mississippi
- Coordinates: 33°37′N 89°17′W
- Country: United States
- State: Mississippi
- Founded: 1874
- Named for: Daniel Webster
- Seat: Walthall
- Largest city: Eupora

Area
  - Total: 423 sq mi (1,100 km^{2})
  - Land: 421 sq mi (1,090 km^{2})
  - Water: 2.3 sq mi (6.0 km^{2}) 0.5%

Population (2020)
  - Total: 9,926
  - Estimate (2025): 10,167 ▲
  - Density: 23.6/sq mi (9.10/km^{2})
- Time zone: UTC−6 (Central)
  - Summer (DST): UTC−5 (CDT)
- Congressional district: 1st

Webster County is a county located in center of the U.S. state of Mississippi, bordered on the south by the Big Black River. As of the 2020 census, the population was 9,926.

The county was organized in 1874 during the Reconstruction era; the biracial legislature named it after Massachusetts statesman Daniel Webster. Its county seat is Walthall, designated in 1876.

After the repeal of Prohibition in 1933, Webster County voters established this as a "dry county." In 2018 the legislature passed a bill allowing the transport of alcohol through even dry counties in the state.

== History ==
Webster County was formed in 1874 as Sumner County, during the Reconstruction era, from parts of the neighboring Montgomery, Chickasaw, Choctaw and Oktibbeha counties. Its southern border is formed by the Big Black River, a tributary of the Mississippi River. Its name was changed to Webster County in 1882.

In a pattern typical of frontier areas, as population in the Mississippi Territory increased, the original, large Choctaw and Oktibbeha counties were gradually divided in order to establish smaller counties. This territory had been acquired in 1833 by the United States from the Choctaw in the Treaty of Dancing Rabbit Creek. At that time the large Choctaw County, Mississippi consisted of territory that later was divided to organize also Webster, the eastern part of Montgomery and a small portion of Grenada counties.

After Indian Removal, Choctaw County was inhabited primarily by European-American settlers from Alabama, Georgia, and South Carolina, and enslaved African Americans whom they brought with them or purchased as laborers.

Greensboro was designated as the first county seat. A temporary courthouse and log jail were built there. These were replaced in 1839 by a brick courthouse and jail. This courthouse was destroyed by fire in 1865, allegedly by an arsonist. Almost all of the early county records were destroyed in the fire.

In the early years Greensboro was thriving, with several types of stores and shops, as the county seat was a trading center for the agricultural district. It also had saloons, a livery stable, a brick yard, and a newspaper. A Methodist church was founded as early as 1839, and a Baptist church was begun in 1846. The Greensboro Lodge No. 49 of Free and Accepted Masons was chartered in 1842.

Part of the Mississippi frontier, Greensboro had the reputation of a rough and lawless town; many notorious criminals and murders were located there. John A. Murell, a famed outlaw of the Natchez Trace, was tried and convicted of horse stealing. While being transported to Columbus, Mississippi for incarceration, he killed his guard and escaped.

As the county seat, Greensboro sometimes received political candidates running for office. For instance, in 1851 the young Jefferson Davis came seeking voters to support him in his campaign for governor.

In 1861 the Edwards-Gray feud erupted, which developed from a fight over the settlement of the estate of Edward Dewitt Edwards, Jr. His family challenged his bequest to his widow, Mary "Molly" Gray Edwards. Three of her brothers: William, James, and Robert Gray, shot and killed judge Edward D. Edwards, Sr. and his son Luther Edwards in a confrontation over the estate. The Gray brothers were arrested and jailed; however, before a trial could be held, an outraged mob stormed the jail, fatally shooting two of the brothers and hanging the third.

At the outbreak of the American Civil War, seven young men of Greensboro and Choctaw County rushed to enlist. The first company organized was the Wigfall Rifles, company D 15th Mississippi Infantry Regiment. This unit was formed in Greensboro in April 1861, commanded by Captain William F. Brantley of Greensboro; he later was promoted during the last year of the war as one of the youngest Confederate generals.

As the war began to turn against the South, many soldiers from the vicinity began to desert from the Confederate Army after 1863 and return home without permission. Some were principled Unionists opposed to the war who began organized clandestine efforts to undermine local Confederate authority, but others were little more than robbers who formed themselves into bandit gangs and preyed on the civilian population. In November 1864, Mississippi Governor Charles Clark wrote: "There are more deserters there [Choctaw County] than elsewhere. It is estimated that 500 are in that county." In December, 1864 Union troops under General Benjamin Grierson raided through the area, and in the spring of 1865 as the Confederacy collapsed local unionists raised the US Flag in Greensboro, the county seat at the time.

General W.F. Brantley returned to Greensboro to practice law after the war and married again. (His first wife had died in 1863.) Local feuds and political unrest continued to erupt in violence during and after the Reconstruction era, when political tensions in the South were high, as conservative whites tried to re-establish their power over freedmen. Brantley's older brother, physician John Ransom Brantley, had been killed in Gonzales, Texas in 1859. Their younger brother Arnold Brantley was shot and killed near Greensboro on August 16, 1870; his murderers escaped. According to the Clarion, General Brantley was said to be seeking reprisal for his brothers' murders. He was ambushed on November 2, 1870, and killed by a shotgun blast while riding from Winona to Greensboro. No one was prosecuted for these deaths.

Reflecting population changes in the county, in 1872 the state legislature moved the county seat from Greensboro to La Grange (historical), Mississippi, located west of the Natchez Trace. In 1874 Webster County, Mississippi was formed from parts of Choctaw county, and Greensboro was first designated as its county seat. But in 1876 the legislature moved the county seat to the more centrally located Walthall.

Greensboro, which had already begun to decline after the first shift in the county seat, rapidly lost population after this change. Many of the residents and businesses moved to the new county seat.

=== 20th century to present ===
For years after Prohibition was repealed in 1933, Webster County voters kept it "dry". The police of Mathiston, Mississippi, which was largely located in Webster County, frequently conducted roadblocks on those parts of highways running through town that were located in Webster. They would search for and seize all alcohol being transported through the county. On July 1, 2018, the legislature passed Mississippi House Bill 192, legalizing transport of all alcohol, by persons 21 and older, through dry counties within the state, and ending such actions.

== Geography ==
According to the U.S. Census Bureau, the county has a total area of 423 square miles (1,100 km^{2}), of which 421 square miles (1,090 km^{2}) is land and 2.3 square miles (6.0 km^{2}) (0.5%) is water.

=== Major highways ===
- U.S. Highway 82
- Mississippi Highway 9
- Mississippi Highway 15
- Mississippi Highway 46
- Mississippi Highway 50
- Natchez Trace Parkway

=== Adjacent counties ===
- Calhoun County (north)
- Chickasaw County (northeast)
- Clay County (east)
- Oktibbeha County (southeast)
- Choctaw County (south)
- Montgomery County (west)
- Grenada County (northwest)

=== National protected area ===
- Natchez Trace Parkway (part)

== Demographics ==
Historical population
| Census | Pop. | Note | %± |
|---|---|---|---|
| 1880 | 9,534 | | — |
| 1890 | 12,060 | | 26.5% |
| 1900 | 13,619 | | 12.9% |
| 1910 | 14,853 | | 9.1% |
| 1920 | 12,644 | | −14.9% |
| 1930 | 12,128 | | −4.1% |
| 1940 | 14,160 | | 16.8% |
| 1950 | 11,607 | | −18.0% |
| 1960 | 10,580 | | −8.8% |
| 1970 | 10,047 | | −5.0% |
| 1980 | 10,300 | | 2.5% |
| 1990 | 10,222 | | −0.8% |
| 2000 | 10,294 | | 0.7% |
| 2010 | 10,253 | | −0.4% |
| 2020 | 9,926 | | −3.2% |
| 2025 (est.) | 10,167 | ▲ | 2.4% |
U.S. Decennial Census; 1790-1960 1900-1990; 1990-2000 2010-2013

=== Racial and ethnic composition ===
Webster County, Mississippi – Racial and ethnic composition Note: the US Census treats Hispanic/Latino as an ethnic category. This table excludes Latinos from the racial categories and assigns them to a separate category. Hispanics/Latinos may be of any race.
| Race / Ethnicity (NH = Non-Hispanic) | Pop 1980 | Pop 1990 | Pop 2000 | Pop 2010 | Pop 2020 | % 1980 | % 1990 | % 2000 | % 2010 | % 2020 |
|---|---|---|---|---|---|---|---|---|---|---|
| White alone (NH) | 8,213 | 7,914 | 7,919 | 8,007 | 7,691 | 79.74% | 77.42% | 76.93% | 78.09% | 77.48% |
| Black or African American alone (NH) | 1,970 | 2,238 | 2,134 | 2,036 | 1,782 | 19.13% | 21.89% | 20.73% | 19.86% | 17.95% |
| Native American or Alaska Native alone (NH) | 5 | 2 | 10 | 15 | 14 | 0.05% | 0.02% | 0.10% | 0.15% | 0.14% |
| Asian alone (NH) | 5 | 10 | 18 | 11 | 13 | 0.05% | 0.10% | 0.17% | 0.11% | 0.13% |
| Native Hawaiian or Pacific Islander alone (NH) | x | x | 0 | 0 | 1 | x | x | 0.00% | 0.00% | 0.01% |
| Other race alone (NH) | 4 | 1 | 2 | 6 | 21 | 0.04% | 0.01% | 0.02% | 0.06% | 0.21% |
| Mixed race or Multiracial (NH) | x | x | 37 | 74 | 249 | x | x | 0.36% | 0.72% | 2.51% |
| Hispanic or Latino (any race) | 103 | 57 | 174 | 104 | 155 | 1.00% | 0.56% | 1.69% | 1.01% | 1.56% |
| Total | 10,300 | 10,222 | 10,294 | 10,253 | 9,926 | 100.00% | 100.00% | 100.00% | 100.00% | 100.00% |

=== 2020 census ===
As of the 2020 census, the county had a population of 9,926. The median age was 42.5 years. 23.2% of residents were under the age of 18 and 19.9% of residents were 65 years of age or older. For every 100 females there were 92.4 males, and for every 100 females age 18 and over there were 89.3 males age 18 and over.

The racial makeup of the county was 77.8% White, 18.0% Black or African American, 0.2% American Indian and Alaska Native, 0.1% Asian, <0.1% Native Hawaiian and Pacific Islander, 0.5% from some other race, and 3.3% from two or more races. Hispanic or Latino residents of any race comprised 1.6% of the population.

<0.1% of residents lived in urban areas, while 100.0% lived in rural areas.

There were 4,066 households in the county, of which 31.8% had children under the age of 18 living in them. Of all households, 47.8% were married-couple households, 18.3% were households with a male householder and no spouse or partner present, and 30.0% were households with a female householder and no spouse or partner present. About 30.2% of all households were made up of individuals and 15.8% had someone living alone who was 65 years of age or older.

There were 5,066 housing units, of which 19.7% were vacant. Among occupied housing units, 75.2% were owner-occupied and 24.8% were renter-occupied. The homeowner vacancy rate was 1.6% and the rental vacancy rate was 16.3%.

=== 2000 census ===
As of the census of 2000, there were 10,294 people, 3,905 households, and 2,877 families residing in the county. The population density was 24 people per square mile (9.3 people/km^{2}). There were 4,344 housing units at an average density of 10 units per square mile (3.9 units/km^{2}). The racial makeup of the county was 77.55% White, 20.93% Black or African American, 0.11% Native American, 0.17% Asian, 0.01% Pacific Islander, 0.84% from other races, and 0.39% from two or more races. 1.69% of the population were Hispanic or Latino of any race.

There were 3,905 households, out of which 33.90% had children under the age of 18 living with them, 56.20% were married couples living together, 13.10% had a female householder with no husband present, and 26.30% were non-families. 24.00% of all households were made up of individuals, and 12.20% had someone living alone who was 65 years of age or older. The average household size was 2.59 and the average family size was 3.07.

In the county, the population was spread out, with 26.10% under the age of 18, 9.00% from 18 to 24, 26.60% from 25 to 44, 21.80% from 45 to 64, and 16.40% who were 65 years of age or older. The median age was 37 years. For every 100 females there were 93.50 males. For every 100 females age 18 and over, there were 89.40 males.

The median income for a household in the county was $28,834, and the median income for a family was $34,969. Males had a median income of $27,297 versus $19,627 for females. The per capita income for the county was $14,109. About 14.80% of families and 18.70% of the population were below the poverty line, including 24.60% of those under age 18 and 18.30% of those age 65 or over.

== Communities ==
=== City ===
- Eupora

=== Towns ===
- Maben (mostly in Oktibbeha County)
- Mathiston (partly in Choctaw County)

=== Villages ===
- Mantee
- Walthall (county seat)

=== Unincorporated communities ===
- Alva
- Bellefontaine
- Clarkson
- Cumberland
- Dancy
- Embry
- Fame
- Grady
- Hohenlinden
- Old Greensboro
- Pellez
- Sapa
- Spring Valley
- Ticky Bend
- Tomnolen

== Politics ==
Webster County is a Republican stronghold. In every election since 2000 the Republican share of the vote has increased in the county, culminating in 2024, the strongest Republican showing since 1972.

United States presidential election results for Webster County, Mississippi
| Year | Republican | | Democratic | | Third party(ies) | |
| Year | No. | % | No. | % | No. | % |
|---|---|---|---|---|---|---|
| 1912 | 32 | 3.79% | 655 | 77.61% | 157 | 18.60% |
| 1916 | 143 | 12.62% | 944 | 83.32% | 46 | 4.06% |
| 1920 | 299 | 32.46% | 576 | 62.54% | 46 | 4.99% |
| 1924 | 115 | 10.18% | 918 | 81.24% | 97 | 8.58% |
| 1928 | 338 | 23.47% | 1,102 | 76.53% | 0 | 0.00% |
| 1932 | 35 | 3.09% | 1,092 | 96.38% | 6 | 0.53% |
| 1936 | 56 | 3.72% | 1,439 | 95.49% | 12 | 0.80% |
| 1940 | 87 | 5.16% | 1,595 | 94.55% | 5 | 0.30% |
| 1944 | 127 | 7.79% | 1,504 | 92.21% | 0 | 0.00% |
| 1948 | 47 | 3.35% | 277 | 19.73% | 1,080 | 76.92% |
| 1952 | 453 | 20.42% | 1,765 | 79.58% | 0 | 0.00% |
| 1956 | 188 | 10.77% | 1,412 | 80.92% | 145 | 8.31% |
| 1960 | 299 | 14.76% | 553 | 27.30% | 1,174 | 57.95% |
| 1964 | 2,884 | 92.41% | 237 | 7.59% | 0 | 0.00% |
| 1968 | 330 | 8.20% | 295 | 7.33% | 3,398 | 84.46% |
| 1972 | 3,624 | 89.15% | 403 | 9.91% | 38 | 0.93% |
| 1976 | 1,943 | 45.39% | 2,218 | 51.81% | 120 | 2.80% |
| 1980 | 2,386 | 50.64% | 2,178 | 46.22% | 148 | 3.14% |
| 1984 | 3,390 | 70.71% | 1,397 | 29.14% | 7 | 0.15% |
| 1988 | 3,061 | 66.08% | 1,550 | 33.46% | 21 | 0.45% |
| 1992 | 2,791 | 55.95% | 1,746 | 35.00% | 451 | 9.04% |
| 1996 | 2,254 | 57.85% | 1,379 | 35.40% | 263 | 6.75% |
| 2000 | 3,069 | 67.52% | 1,426 | 31.38% | 50 | 1.10% |
| 2004 | 3,708 | 73.21% | 1,341 | 26.48% | 16 | 0.32% |
| 2008 | 4,072 | 74.62% | 1,349 | 24.72% | 36 | 0.66% |
| 2012 | 3,992 | 76.27% | 1,190 | 22.74% | 52 | 0.99% |
| 2016 | 3,976 | 78.44% | 1,019 | 20.10% | 74 | 1.46% |
| 2020 | 4,291 | 79.54% | 1,043 | 19.33% | 61 | 1.13% |
| 2024 | 4,195 | 82.34% | 872 | 17.11% | 28 | 0.55% |

== Education ==
The sole school district is the Webster County School District.

== See also ==
- Dry counties
- National Register of Historic Places listings in Webster County, Mississippi
