= French Camp, Mississippi =

- Town
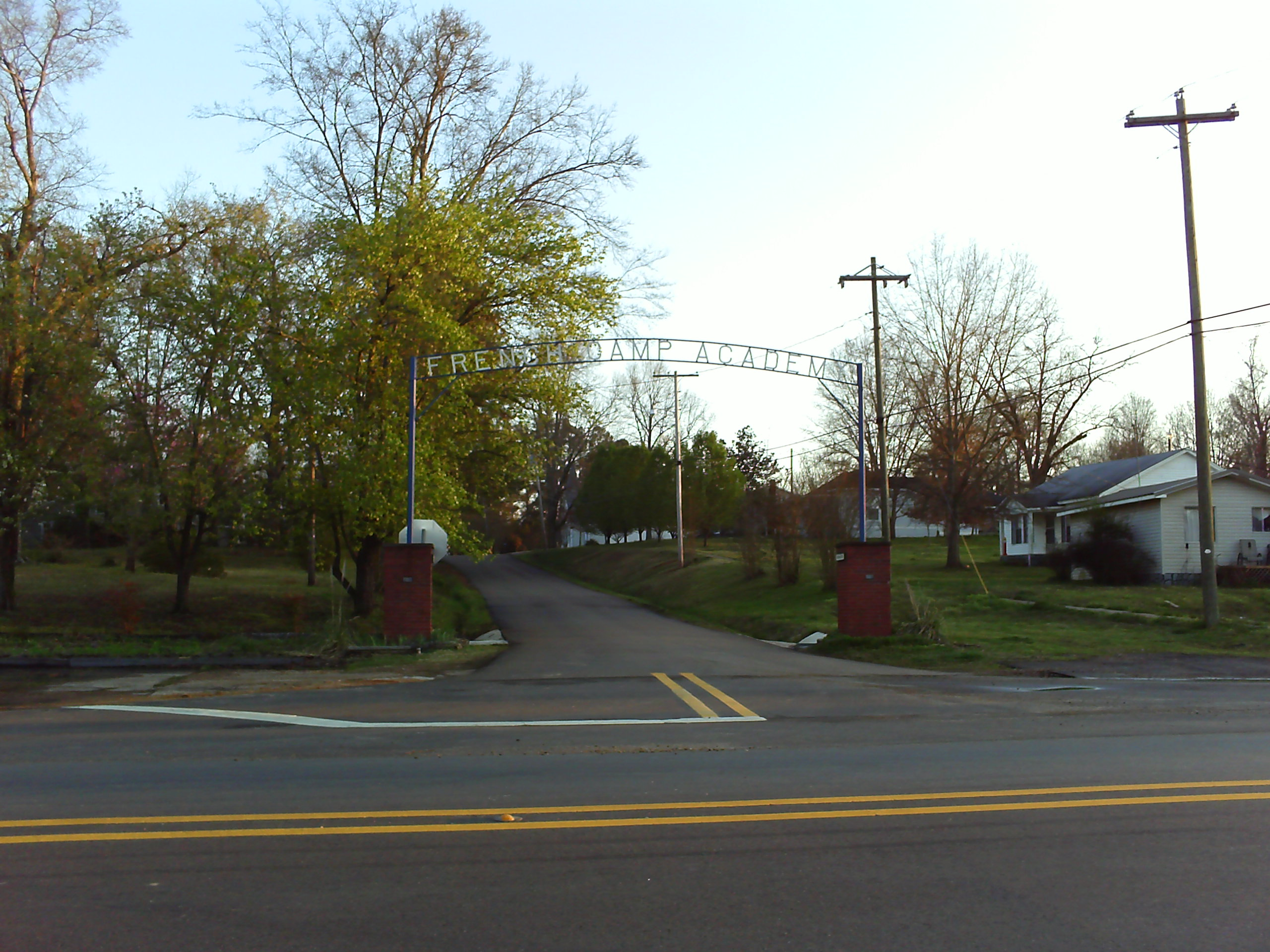
- French Camp Academy

- Flag

- Location of French Camp, Mississippi
- Coordinates: 33°17′38″N 89°24′1″W
- Country: United States
- State: Mississippi
- County: Choctaw

Government
  - Mayor: Glen Barlow
  - Alderman: Dennis Cates
  - Alderwoman: Jenny Morgan
  - Alderman: Phil Nicholson
  - Alderwoman: Becky Stephens
  - Alderwoman: Jan Henderson

Area
  - Total: 0.99 sq mi (2.56 km^{2})
  - Land: 0.98 sq mi (2.54 km^{2})
  - Water: 0.0077 sq mi (0.02 km^{2})
- Elevation: 413 ft (126 m)

Population (2020)
  - Total: 256
  - Density: 261.0/sq mi (100.76/km^{2})
- Time zone: UTC-6 (Central (CST))
  - Summer (DST): UTC-5 (CDT)
- ZIP code: 39745
- Area code: 662
- FIPS code: 28-26020
- GNIS feature ID: 0670200

French Camp is a town in Choctaw County, Mississippi, United States. As of the 2020 census, French Camp had a population of 256.

== History ==
The town dates back to circa 1810, when a Frenchman, Louis Lefleur, established a stand or trading post and inn, on the Natchez Trace. The Choctaw natives and others in the area called it the Frenchman's Camp. Later it was shortened to French Camp.

== Geography ==
French Camp is located in western Choctaw County, and is bordered to the south by Attala County. The Natchez Trace Parkway passes through the town, crossing Mississippi Highway 413 just west of the center of town.

According to the United States Census Bureau, the town has a total area of 1.0 square mile (2.6 km^{2}), of which 0.0077 square miles (0.02 km^{2}), or 0.81%, is water.

== Demographics ==
Historical population
Census	Pop.	Note	%±
1880	420		—
1890	267		−36.4%
1900	259		−3.0%
1910	220		−15.1%
1920	123		−44.1%
1930	181		47.2%
1940	172		−5.0%
1950	162		−5.8%
1960	123		−24.1%
1970	174		41.5%
1980	306		75.9%
1990	320		4.6%
2000	393		22.8%
2010	174		−55.7%
2020	256		47.1%
U.S. Decennial Census

As of the census of 2000, there were 393 people, 68 households, and 42 families residing in the town. The population density was 398.1 inhabitants per square mile (153.7/km^{2}). There were 74 housing units at an average density of 75.0 per square mile (29.0/km^{2}). The racial makeup of the town was 92.37% White, 5.09% African American, 1.53% from other races, and 1.02% from two or more races. Hispanic or Latino of any race were 1.27% of the population.

There were 68 households, out of which 26.5% had children under the age of 18 living with them, 54.4% were married couples living together, 4.4% had a female householder with no husband present, and 36.8% were non-families. 36.8% of all households were made up of individuals, and 17.6% had someone living alone who was 65 years of age or older. The average household size was 2.43 and the average family size was 3.19.

In the town, the population was spread out, with 48.6% under the age of 18, 9.4% from 18 to 24, 13.5% from 25 to 44, 16.5% from 45 to 64, and 12.0% who were 65 years of age or older. The median age was 18 years. For every 100 females, there were 113.6 males. For every 100 females age 18 and over, there were 96.1 males.

The median income for a household in the town was $26,250, and the median income for a family was $27,188. Males had a median income of $13,750 versus $12,813 for females. The per capita income for the town was $5,047. (The lowest in Mississippi) About 17.1% of families and 64.5% of the population were below the poverty line, including 70.5% of those under age 18 and none of those age 65 or over.

== Arts and culture ==
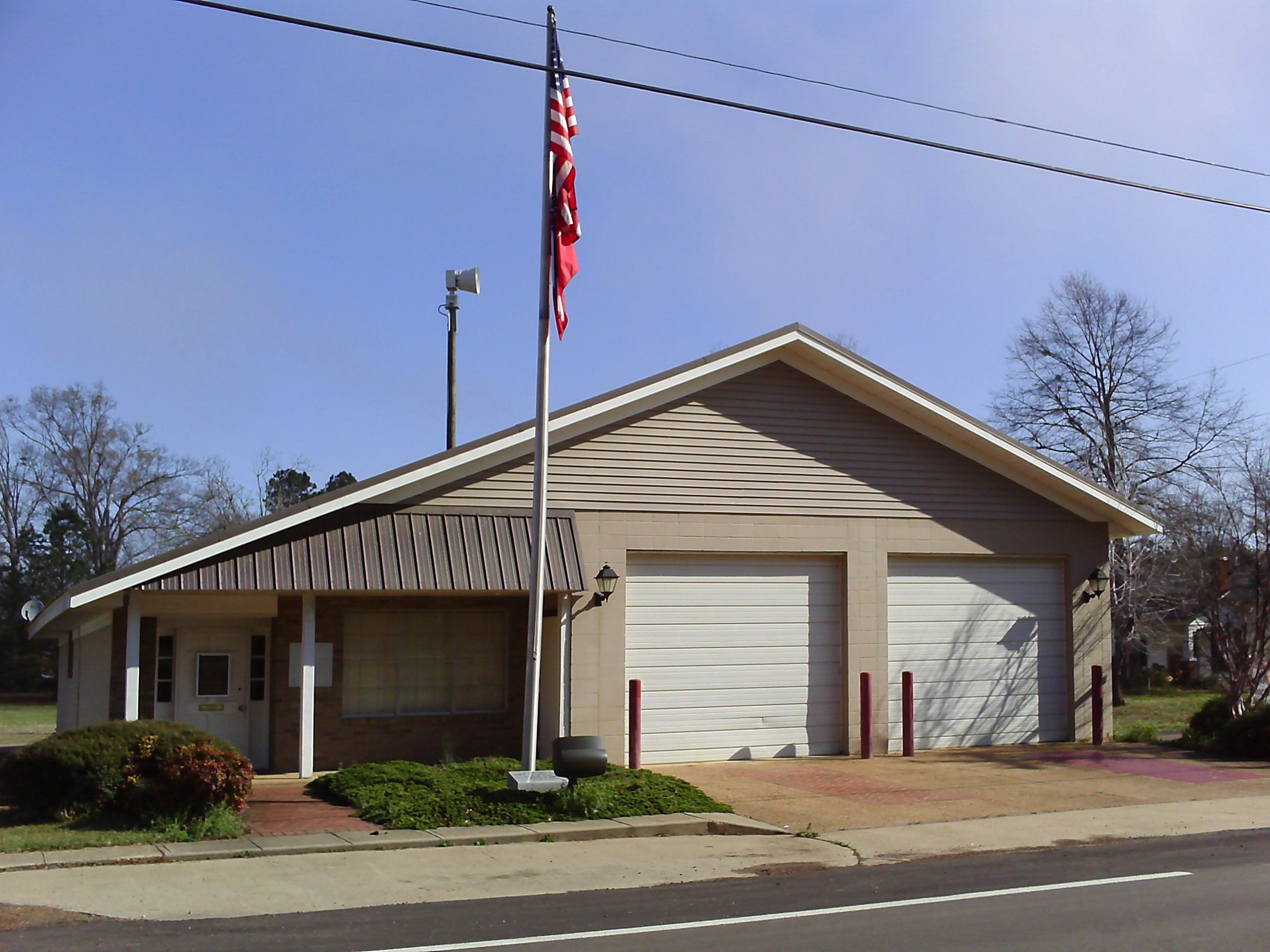
City Hall

- Rainwater Observatory and Planetarium
- Natchez Trace Historic Village

== Education ==
- French Camp Elementary School, operated by the Choctaw County School District.
- French Camp Academy, a Christian boarding school.

== Media ==
- WFCA (FM)
