= Mathiston, Mississippi =

- Town
- Location of Mathiston, Mississippi

- Location in the United States
- Coordinates: 33°32′12″N 89°7′36″W
- Country: United States
- State: Mississippi
- Counties: Webster, Choctaw

Area
  - Total: 2.53 sq mi (6.56 km^{2})
  - Land: 2.50 sq mi (6.48 km^{2})
  - Water: 0.027 sq mi (0.07 km^{2})
- Elevation: 420 ft (128 m)

Population (2020)
  - Total: 831
  - Density: 332.1/sq mi (128.21/km^{2})
- Time zone: UTC-6 (Central (CST))
  - Summer (DST): UTC-5 (CDT)
- ZIP code: 39752
- Area code: 662
- FIPS code: 28-45720
- GNIS feature ID: 0673240
- Website: www.mathiston.ms.gov

Mathiston is a town in Webster and Choctaw counties, Mississippi. The population was 831 at the 2020 census.

== Geography ==
Most of the town is in Webster County with a portion on the south side extending into Choctaw County. In the 2000 census, 643 of the town's 720 residents (89.3%) lived in Webster County and 77 (10.7%) in Choctaw County.

According to the United States Census Bureau, the town has a total area of 2.5 square miles (6.4 km^{2}), all land.

=== Climate ===
The climate in this area is characterized by hot, humid summers and generally mild to cool winters. According to the Köppen Climate Classification system, Mathiston has a humid subtropical climate, abbreviated "Cfa" on climate maps.

== Demographics ==
Historical population
Census	Pop.	Note	%±
1900	170		—
1910	576		238.8%
1920	463		−19.6%
1930	484		4.5%
1940	549		13.4%
1950	584		6.4%
1960	597		2.2%
1970	570		−4.5%
1980	632		10.9%
1990	818		29.4%
2000	720		−12.0%
2010	698		−3.1%
2020	831		19.1%
U.S. Decennial Census

=== 2020 census ===
Mathiston racial composition
Race	Num.	Perc.
White (non-Hispanic)	688	82.79%
Black or African American (non-Hispanic)	104	12.52%
Asian	2	0.24%
Other/Mixed	22	2.65%
Hispanic or Latino	15	1.81%

As of the 2020 United States census, there were 831 people, 250 households, and 171 families residing in the town.

=== 2000 census ===
As of the census of 2000, there were 720 people, 294 households, and 194 families residing in the town. The population density was 289.7 inhabitants per square mile (111.9/km^{2}). There were 323 housing units at an average density of 130.0 per square mile (50.2/km^{2}). The racial makeup of the town was 80.00% White, 18.33% African American, 0.69% Asian, 0.69% from other races, and 0.28% from two or more races. Hispanic or Latino of any race were 1.81% of the population.

There were 294 households, out of which 33.0% had children under the age of 18 living with them, 49.7% were married couples living together, 13.6% had a female householder with no husband present, and 33.7% were non-families. 32.0% of all households were made up of individuals, and 19.7% had someone living alone who was 65 years of age or older. The average household size was 2.45 and the average family size was 3.11.

In the town, the population was spread out, with 27.8% under the age of 18, 9.9% from 18 to 24, 24.3% from 25 to 44, 22.1% from 45 to 64, and 16.0% who were 65 years of age or older. The median age was 36 years. For every 100 females, there were 82.3 males. For every 100 females age 18 and over, there were 75.7 males.

The median income for a household in the town was $23,125, and the median income for a family was $28,889. Males had a median income of $27,875 versus $23,472 for females. The per capita income for the town was $12,222. About 21.4% of families and 25.2% of the population were below the poverty line, including 42.5% of those under age 18 and 25.2% of those age 65 or over.

== Education ==
Most of Mathiston is served by the Webster County School District. The Choctaw County portion of Mathiston is served by the Choctaw County School District.

Woodland Seminary opened in Clarkson, Mississippi in 1886. It was renamed Bennett Academy in 1897, moved to Mathiston in 1914, and became Wood Junior College in 1936. It closed in 2003. The former campus is listed on the National Register of Historic Places.
