= Eupora, Mississippi =

- City
- Flag
- Nickname: The City for You
- Motto(s): A City Unified, Working For The Common Good
- Location of Eupora, Mississippi

- Location in Mississippi Location in the United States
- Coordinates: 33°32′30″N 89°16′20″W
- Country: United States
- State: Mississippi
- County: Webster

Government
  - Type: Mayor-Board of Alderman
  - Mayor: Melvin Lamar Dumas

Area
  - Total: 3.68 sq mi (9.54 km^{2})
  - Land: 3.36 sq mi (8.69 km^{2})
  - Water: 0.33 sq mi (0.85 km^{2})
- Elevation: 384 ft (117 m)

Population (2020)
  - Total: 2,018
  - Density: 601.3/sq mi (232.15/km^{2})
- Time zone: UTC-6 (Central (CST))
  - Summer (DST): UTC-5 (CDT)
- ZIP code: 39744
- Area code: 662
- FIPS code: 28-23420
- GNIS feature ID: 0669823
- Website: cityofeuporams.gov

Eupora is the largest city in Webster County, Mississippi, United States. As of the 2020 census, it had a population of 2,018.

== History ==
Eupora was established in 1889 by European Americans on a spur track of the Georgia Pacific Railway. While there was agricultural development prior to the railroad being built in the county, the railroad stimulated trade and businesses. Eupora is the largest city in Webster County.

Near the city there was armed conflict in 1770, among some Native American tribes. The Chakchiuma were destroyed by the allied Choctaw and Chickasaw, who were traditional enemies in the region. They dominated territories in what became Mississippi and Alabama. In 1904, Bud Simpson, an African American man accused of raping white girls, was not given a trial and hanged from a tree by a group of 200 cheering white people, who then shot him.

== Geography ==
According to the United States Census Bureau, the city has a total area of 3.6 square miles (9.3 km^{2}), of which 3.3 square miles (8.4 km^{2}) is land and 0.3 square mile (0.8 km^{2}) (8.94%) is water.

=== Climate ===
Climate data for Eupora, Mississippi (1991–2020 normals, extremes 1927–2016)
Month	Jan	Feb	Mar	Apr	May	Jun	Jul	Aug	Sep	Oct	Nov	Dec	Year
Record high °F (°C)	85 (29)	89 (32)	93 (34)	97 (36)	100 (38)	109 (43)	110 (43)	110 (43)	107 (42)	100 (38)	91 (33)	82 (28)	110 (43)
Mean daily maximum °F (°C)	52.8 (11.6)	57.5 (14.2)	65.9 (18.8)	74.1 (23.4)	81.2 (27.3)	87.4 (30.8)	90.2 (32.3)	90.1 (32.3)	85.7 (29.8)	75.7 (24.3)	64.0 (17.8)	55.4 (13.0)	73.3 (23.0)
Daily mean °F (°C)	42.2 (5.7)	46.1 (7.8)	53.7 (12.1)	61.6 (16.4)	70.2 (21.2)	76.8 (24.9)	79.9 (26.6)	79.4 (26.3)	74.0 (23.3)	62.7 (17.1)	52.0 (11.1)	44.8 (7.1)	62.0 (16.6)
Mean daily minimum °F (°C)	31.6 (−0.2)	34.7 (1.5)	41.5 (5.3)	49.1 (9.5)	59.1 (15.1)	66.1 (18.9)	69.7 (20.9)	68.7 (20.4)	62.4 (16.9)	49.8 (9.9)	40.0 (4.4)	34.3 (1.3)	50.6 (10.3)
Record low °F (°C)	−9 (−23)	−6 (−21)	11 (−12)	24 (−4)	34 (1)	42 (6)	49 (9)	50 (10)	37 (3)	21 (−6)	10 (−12)	−4 (−20)	−9 (−23)
Average precipitation inches (mm)	5.51 (140)	5.48 (139)	5.77 (147)	5.59 (142)	5.18 (132)	4.38 (111)	4.18 (106)	4.16 (106)	4.17 (106)	3.69 (94)	4.65 (118)	5.94 (151)	58.7 (1,492)
Average snowfall inches (cm)	0.7 (1.8)	0.2 (0.51)	0.0 (0.0)	0.0 (0.0)	0.0 (0.0)	0.0 (0.0)	0.0 (0.0)	0.0 (0.0)	0.0 (0.0)	0.0 (0.0)	0.0 (0.0)	0.1 (0.25)	1.0 (2.5)
Average precipitation days (≥ 0.01 in)	9.6	8.8	8.8	7.1	8.6	9.2	9.1	8.1	6.3	5.4	8.3	9.4	98.7
Average snowy days (≥ 0.1 in)	0.2	0.1	0.0	0.0	0.0	0.0	0.0	0.0	0.0	0.0	0.0	0.1	0.4
Source: NOAA

== Demographics ==
Historical population
Census	Pop.	Note	%±
1890	432		—
1900	724		67.6%
1910	896		23.8%
1920	948		5.8%
1930	1,092		15.2%
1940	1,377		26.1%
1950	1,338		−2.8%
1960	1,468		9.7%
1970	1,792		22.1%
1980	2,048		14.3%
1990	2,145		4.7%
2000	2,326		8.4%
2010	2,197		−5.5%
2020	2,018		−8.1%
U.S. Decennial Census

=== 2020 census ===
Eupora racial composition
Race	Num.	Perc.
White (non-Hispanic)	1,072	53.12%
Black or African American (non-Hispanic)	833	41.28%
Native American	3	0.15%
Asian	3	0.15%
Other/Mixed	52	2.58%
Hispanic or Latino	55	2.73%

As of the 2020 census, there were 2,018 people, 830 households, and 566 families living in the city. The median age was 44.7 years. 21.5% of residents were under the age of 18 and 23.6% of residents were 65 years of age or older. For every 100 females there were 75.2 males, and for every 100 females age 18 and over there were 71.2 males age 18 and over.

Of the residents, 0 percent lived in urban areas, while 100.0% lived in rural areas. Of the city's households, 31.8% had children under the age of 18 living in them. 31.0% were married-couple households, 19.3% were households with a male householder and no spouse or partner present, and 44.5% were households with a female householder and no spouse or partner present. About 36.1% of all households were made up of individuals, and 16.5% had someone living alone who was 65 years of age or older. There were 941 housing units, of which 11.8% were vacant. The homeowner vacancy rate was 3.0% and the rental vacancy rate was 7.4%.

=== 2000 census ===
As of the census of 2000, there were 2,326 people, 877 households, and 590 families residing in the city. The population density was 714.2 inhabitants per square mile (275.8/km^{2}). There were 957 housing units at an average density of 293.9 per square mile (113.5/km^{2}). The racial makeup of the city was 58.86% White, 38.01% African American, 0.13% Native American, 0.17% Asian, 2.28% from other races, and 0.56% from two or more races. Hispanic or Latino of any race were 3.74% of the population.

There were 877 households, out of which 31.9% had children under the age of 18 living with them, 41.3% were married couples living together, 21.2% had a female householder with no husband present, and 32.7% were non-families. 30.4% of all households were made up of individuals, and 16.4% had someone living alone who was 65 years of age or older. The average household size was 2.47 and the average family size was 3.08.

In the city, the population was spread out, with 26.1% under the age of 18, 9.3% from 18 to 24, 24.5% from 25 to 44, 18.1% from 45 to 64, and 22.1% who were 65 years of age or older. The median age was 38 years. For every 100 females, there were 79.5 males. For every 100 females age 18 and over, there were 74.1 males. The median income for a household in the city was $24,839, and the median income for a family was $37,950. Males had a median income of $26,875 versus $21,458 for females. The per capita income for the city was $12,927. About 20.9% of families and 24.0% of the population were below the poverty line, including 35.6% of those under age 18 and 16.9% of those age 65 or over.

== Education ==
The City of Eupora is served by the Webster County School District. There are two elementary schools, two middle schools, two high schools, and a career and technical center.

== Media ==
WLZA serves as an FM radio station and WEPA (AM) previously broadcast from Eupora.

== Notable people ==
- Thomas Abernethy, former U.S. Congressman
- Johnie Hammond, Iowa state legislator
- Joseph Turner Patterson (D) - former Attorney General of Mississippi
- Marckell Patterson, professional basketball player
- Derrick Jones, professional football player for the Canadian Football League and the United States Football League among other leagues
- Donald C. Simmons, Jr., educator, author, poet, and documentary film producer
