= U.S. Route 82 in Mississippi =

Segment of American highway

U.S. Highway 82

Route information
- Maintained by MDOT
- Length: 180.0 mi (289.7 km)
- Existed: 1932–present

Major junctions
- West end: US 82 / US 278 at the Arkansas state line near Greenville
- US 61 / US 278 in Leland; US 49W in Indianola; US 49E in Greenwood; I-55 near Winona; US 51 in Winona; US 45 in Columbus
- East end: US 82 at the Alabama state line near Columbus

Location
- Country: United States
- State: Mississippi
- Counties: Washington, Sunflower, Leflore, Carroll, Montgomery, Webster, Choctaw, Oktibbeha, Lowndes

Highway system
- United States Numbered Highway System; List; Special; Divided; Mississippi State Highway System; Interstate; US; State
← US 80	→ US 84

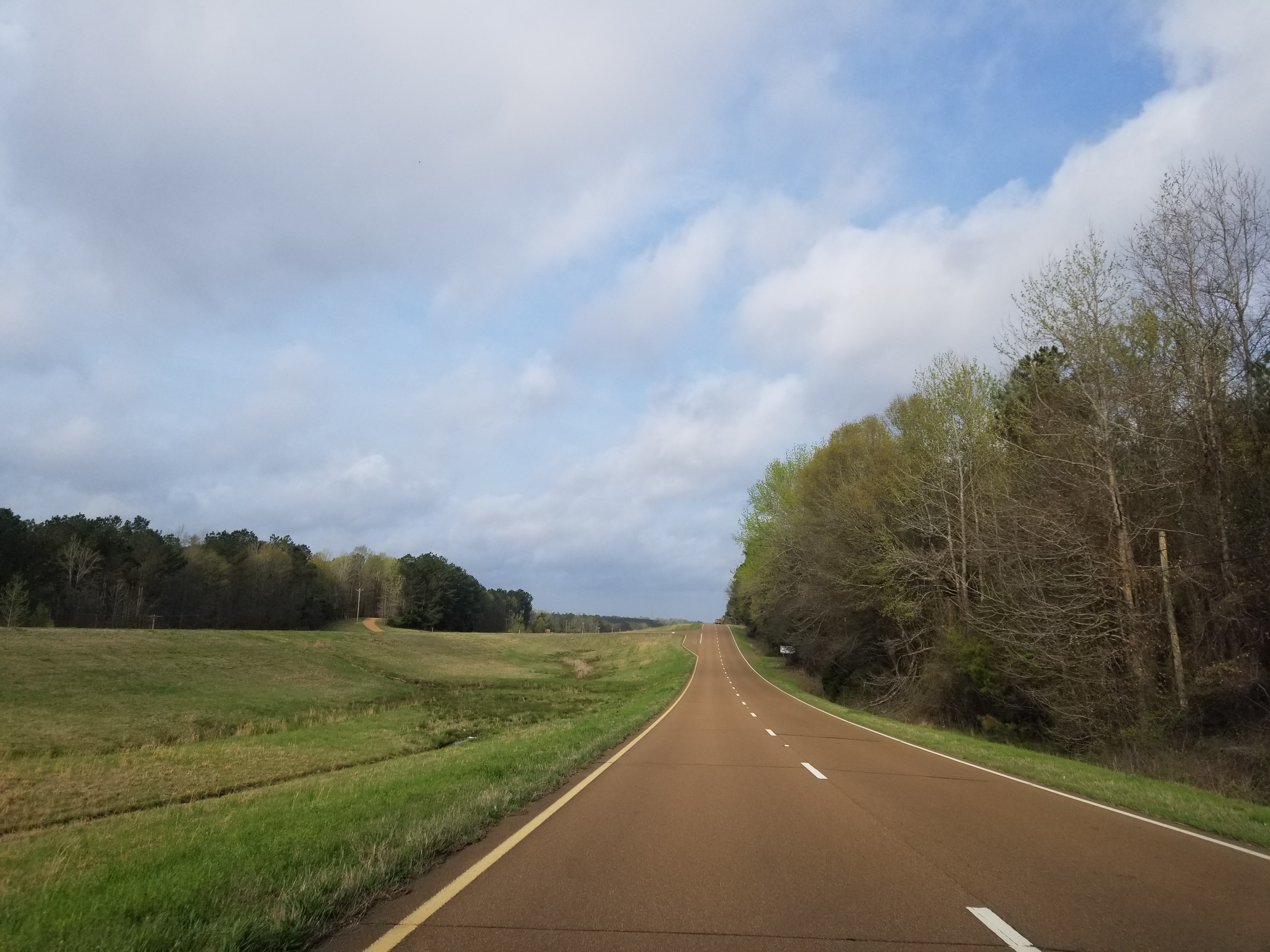
U.S. 82 Westbound crossing into Carroll County near Winona

U.S. Route 82 (US 82) is a section of a west-east highway that travels through Mississippi. It starts at the Arkansas state line at Refuge and ends at the Alabama state line east of Columbus.

== Route description ==
Through the entire state, the highway is four-laned with interchanges at major junctions. US 82 comes in from Arkansas at the Greenville Bridge across the Mississippi River and almost immediately meets MS 454 and MS 182 at a Diamond interchange. The route continues as a freeway on the newly build Greenville Bypass, along with US 278. As the highway enters Leland, the freeway section ends and shortly after, intersects US 61 with U.S. 278 splitting off.

The route continues on as a four-lane divided highway and passes through small communities before reaching Indianola as an urban arterial road, having an intersection with US 49W on the outskirts of the city. From there US 82 passes through farmland, largely as a four-lane expressway with at-grade intersections and limited interchanges, and bypasses the towns of Moorhead and Itta Bena, with MS 7 joining US 82 along the way. The highway reaches Greenwood and meets US 49E which also becomes concurrent with US 82. The two travel through the city and eventually split at a Cloverleaf interchange. Mississippi Highway 7 splits off to the north and US 82 goes east and starts to go through hilly terrain. The route continues through rural hills, eventually meeting I-55 in Winona and US 51 shortly after. The highway goes through eastern Mississippi, bypassing small towns and going through rural forests.

The route eventually enters the Golden Triangle and bypasses Starkville to the north, gaining concurrencies with MS 25 and MS 12, at which point it becomes a freeway once again for the remaining section across the Golden Triangle. MS 25 leaves with an interchange with US 45 Alt.. US 45 joins US 82 at an interchange near Columbus and crosses the Tennessee-Tombigbee Waterway before entering the city and splitting off. After going through Columbus, MS 12 finally ends the concurrency at an interchange with Mississippi Highway 50. US 82 continues as a freeway for a few miles and eventually enters the state of Alabama.

== History ==
US 82 was first requested by MDOT in part as a route that extended from Texarkana, Arkansas to Columbus. Their request was approved on July 1, 1931 after a similar request was made from AHTD processed a similar request. Eventually, in June 1934, an expansion to Tuscaloosa was approved and completed in the same year. The length of US 82 began shortening sometime just before 1939, mainly within cities. The length of the highway in the state was shortened even further by 1942.

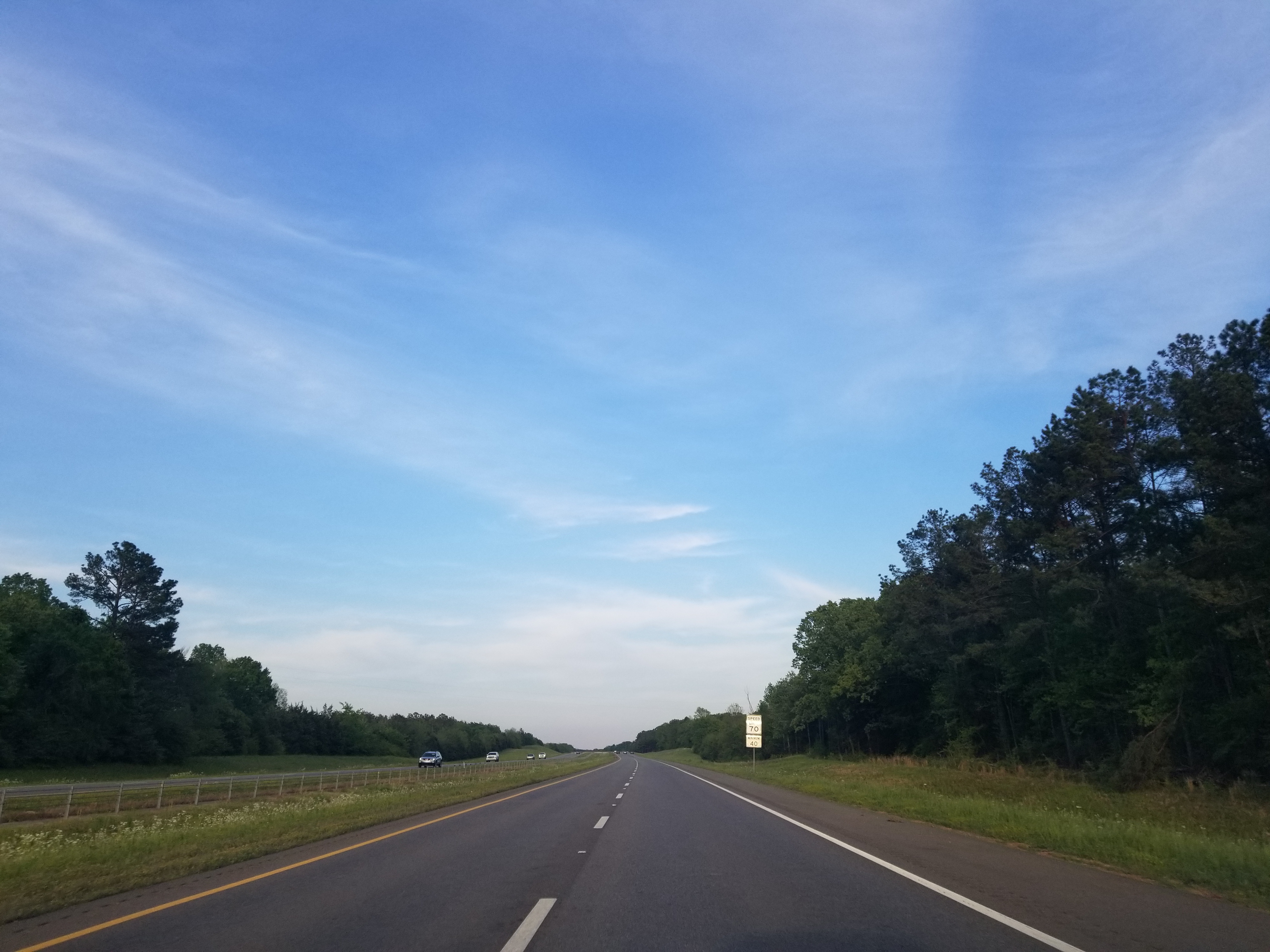
U.S. 82 Eastbound in Lowndes County

A new bypass around Greenville was constructed. The new road commences at the Greenville Bridge and terminates at the previously-existing US 82 near Leland, creating a half-loop freeway around South Greenville. Diamond interchanges were built at the freeway's junctions with MS 454 and MS 1. The bypass was scheduled for completion in fall 2025. It opened to traffic on August 27, 2025.

== Junction list ==
County	Location	mi	km	Destinations	Notes
Mississippi River		0.0	0.0	US 82 west / US 278 west continue via the Greenville Bridge into Arkansas; west end of freeway	
Washington	Refuge	1.1	1.8	MS 454 east / MS 182 east – Greenville	Western terminus of MS 454 and western terminus of Greenville section of MS 182
Washington	Greenville	9.7	15.6	MS 1 / Great River Road (Martin Luther King Jr Boulevard)	
Washington	Leland	17.4	28.0	To MS 182 west (Broad Street) – Leland	Former US 61 north; eastern terminus of Greenville section of MS 182; east end of freeway
Washington	Leland	18.9– 19.5	30.4– 31.4	US 61 / US 278 – Rolling Fork, Cleveland	Interchange; eastern end of US 278 concurrency
Sunflower	Indianola	33.0	53.1	MS 448 west – Shaw	Eastern terminus of MS 448
Sunflower	Indianola	33.7	54.2	US 49W (Martin Luther King Drive) – Yazoo City, Tutwiler	
Sunflower	Moorhead	40.9	65.8	MS 3 – Sunflower, Inverness	
Leflore	Itta Bena	53.4	85.9	MS 7 south (Schley Street) – Belzoni	Western end of MS 7 concurrency
Leflore	Greenwood	57.9	93.2	US 49E north – Tutwiler	Western end of US 49E concurrency
Leflore	Greenwood	62.2– 62.6	100.1– 100.7	US 49E south – Yazoo City; Main Street (MS 743 north) - Downtown	Interchange; eastern end of US 49E concurrency; southern terminus of unsigned MS 743
Leflore	Greenwood	63.6– 63.7	102.4– 102.5	MS 744 west	Eastern terminus of MS 744; no left turn eastbound
Leflore	Greenwood	63.8	102.7	MS 430 east – Blackhawk, Vaiden	Western terminus of MS 430
Leflore	Greenwood	64.1	103.2	MS 7 north – Grenada	Eastern end of MS 7 concurrency
Carroll		77.8	125.2	MS 17 / MS 35 north (Lexington Street) – Carrollton, North Carrollton, Holcomb, Lexington	Western end of MS 35 concurrency
Carroll		79.4	127.8	MS 35 south – Vaiden, Kosciusko	Eastern end of MS 35 concurrency
Montgomery	Winona	86.8	139.7	I-55 – Jackson, Grenada	I-55 exit 185
Montgomery	Winona	87.6	141.0	MS 182 east (Middleton Road) – Downtown	Western terminus of Winona section of MS 182
Montgomery	Winona	88.9	143.1	US 51 (N Applegate Street) – Winona, Duck Hill	Interchange
Montgomery	Kilmichael	98.3	158.2	MS 182 east (N Rutherford Drive) – Kilmichael	Western terminus of Kilmichael section of MS 182
Montgomery	Kilmichael	100.6	161.9	MS 182 (S Rutherford Drive) to MS 413 – Kilmichael, French Camp	Eastern terminus of Kilmichael section of MS 182
Webster		116.6	187.6	MS 182 east (W Roane Avenue) – Eupora	Western terminus of Europa section of MS 182
Webster	Eupora	119.5	192.3	MS 9 – Ackerman, Europa	Interchange
Webster		122.0	196.3	MS 182 west (E Roane Avenue) – Eupora	Eastern terminus of Europa section of MS 182
Webster		126.7	203.9	Natchez Trace Parkway	Interchange
Webster	Mathiston	127.8	205.7	MS 15 south / MS 403 north (Horton Street) – Ackerman, Louisville	Western end of MS 15 concurrency; southern terminus of MS 403
Webster	Mathiston	128.7	207.1	MS 15 north – Maben, Pontotoc	Interchange; Eastern end of MS 15 concurrency
Oktibbeha		137.9	221.9	MS 182 east – Adaton, Starkville	Western terminus of Starkville section of MS 182
Oktibbeha	Starkville	144.6– 145.3	232.7– 233.8	MS 25 south – Louisville	Interchange; west end of freeway; western end of MS 25 concurrency
Oktibbeha	Starkville	145.6	234.3	MS 389 – Pheba, Starkville	
Oktibbeha	Starkville	147.7– 148.2	237.7– 238.5	MS 12 west – Starkville, Mississippi State University	Western end of MS 12 concurrency
Oktibbeha	Clayton Village	149.5– 150.0	240.6– 241.4	MS 182 – Starkville, Clayton Village	
Oktibbeha		153.5	247.0	Hickory Grove Road	
Lowndes		156.3	251.5	US 45 Alt. / MS 25 – West Point, Brooksville	Eastern end of MS 25 concurrency
Lowndes		160.5	258.3	MS 791 south	Access to Golden Triangle Regional Airport; northern terminus of MS 791
Lowndes		166.2	267.5	US 45 south – Macon, Meridian	Western end of US 45 concurrency
Lowndes	Bridge over the Tennessee-Tombigbee Waterway				
Lowndes	Columbus	169.4	272.6	MS 182 east (Main Street) – Columbus	Western terminus of Columbus section of MS 182
Lowndes	Columbus	170.0	273.6	US 45 north / MS 50 west / MS 69 south (N 5th Street) – West Point, Aberdeen, Amory	Eastern end of US 45 concurrency; Western end of MS 50 concurrency; Northern terminus of MS 69
Lowndes	Columbus	170.6	274.6	North 18th Avenue	
Lowndes	Columbus	171.7	276.3	Military Road	
Lowndes	Columbus	173.9	279.9	MS 12 east / MS 50 east (Tuscaloosa Road)	Eastern end of MS 12 concurrency; Eastern end of MS 50 concurrency
Lowndes		178.9– 179.3	287.9– 288.6	Lee Stokes Road	
Alabama state line		180.0	289.7	US 82 east continues into Alabama; East end of freeway SR 6 east begins	
1.000 mi = 1.609 km; 1.000 km = 0.621 mi: Concurrency terminus; Unopened

U.S. Route 82
Previous state: Arkansas	Mississippi	Next state: Alabama
