= Sturgis, Mississippi =

- Town
- Location of Sturgis, Mississippi

- Location in the United States
- Coordinates: 33°20′38″N 89°2′48″W
- Country: United States
- State: Mississippi
- County: Oktibbeha

Government
  - Mayor: Leah Brown
  - Police Chief: Doug Hamilton

Area
  - Total: 1.29 sq mi (3.34 km^{2})
  - Land: 1.29 sq mi (3.34 km^{2})
  - Water: 0 sq mi (0.00 km^{2})
- Elevation: 338 ft (103 m)

Population (2020)
  - Total: 207
  - Density: 160.4/sq mi (61.95/km^{2})
- Time zone: UTC-6 (Central (CST))
  - Summer (DST): UTC-5 (CDT)
- ZIP code: 39769
- Area code: 662
- FIPS code: 28-71320
- GNIS feature ID: 0694900
- Website: www.townofsturgisms.com

Sturgis is a town in Oktibbeha County, Mississippi. The population was 207 at the 2020 census.

Sturgis annually hosts "The Rally", an all-bike motorcycle rally, also known as the Little Sturgis Rally. According to Scott Smith, former mayor of Sturgis, in 2005 around 20,000 visitors attended that year's rally. The most recent was in August 2024, there was a 2 year hiatus in 2020-2021 due to COVID-19 concerns.

== Geography ==
Sturgis is located at 33°20′38″N 89°2′48″W (33.344027, -89.046618).

According to the United States Census Bureau, the town has a total area of 1.29 square miles (3.3 km^{2}), all land.

== Demographics ==
Historical population
Census	Pop.	Note	%±
1910	321		—
1920	354		10.3%
1930	477		34.7%
1940	485		1.7%
1950	402		−17.1%
1960	358		−10.9%
1970	321		−10.3%
1980	269		−16.2%
1990	198		−26.4%
2000	206		4.0%
2010	254		23.3%
2020	207		−18.5%
U.S. Decennial Census

As of the census of 2020, there were 207 people, 108 households, and 46 families residing in the town. The population density was 160.47 inhabitants per square mile (61.96/km^{2}). There were 109 housing units at an average density of 84.49 per square mile (32.62/km^{2}). The racial makeup of the town was 85.02% White, 11.11% African American, 1.93% from other races. Hispanic or Latino of any race were 1.93% of the population.

There were 108 households, out of which 14.8% had children under the age of 18 living with them, 33.3% were married couples living together, 25% had a female householder with no husband present, and 39.8% had a male householder with no wife present. 40.2% of all households were made up of individuals, and 22.02% had someone living alone who was 65 years of age or older. The average household size was 1.64 and the average family size was 2.42.

In the town, the population was spread out, with 7.9% under the age of 18, 9.6% from 18 to 24, 32.2% from 25 to 44, 26.6% from 45 to 64, and 23.7% who were 65 years of age or older. The median age was 45.1 years. For every 100 females, there were 115.9 males.

The median income for a household in the town was $39,167 and the median income for a family was $56,250. Males had a median income of $63,571 versus $35,625 for females. 26.6% of the population were living below the poverty line, 14.3% of under eighteens and 19% of those over 64.

== Education ==
The Town of Sturgis is served by the Starkville Oktibbeha Consolidated School District. West Oktibbeha County Elementary School (formerly Sturgis Elementary School) is in Sturgis. All residents are zoned to Armstrong Middle School and Starkville High School in Starkville.

It was previously in the Oktibbeha County School District, and Sturgis had its own schools, including Sturgis High School, which was merged with Maben High School to form West Oktibbeha County High School. In 2013, the Mississippi Legislature passed a bill requiring that all Oktibbeha County schools be merged into the Starkville School District.

In 2015 the West Oktibbeha County High School in Maben, which served Sturgis, consolidated into Starkville High.

Sturgis is served by the Starkville-Oktibbeha County Public Library System which operateas the Sturgis Public Library.

East Mississippi Community College is the community college of Oktibbeha County.

== Sturgis South Bike Rally ==
For fourteen straight years, taking advantage of the built-in name recognition of the Sturgis Motorcycle Rally in Sturgis, South Dakota, Sturgis was home to the annual Sturgis South Bike Rally, which drew crowds of as many as 20,000 people. After being discontinued due to a funding conflict between rally organizers and local government from 2011-2013, the rally resumed in 2014.

== Notable people ==
- N. Q. Adams, Mississippi state senator (1896-1900) and House member (1908-1912)
- Lovie Gore, member of the Mississippi House of Representatives from 1952 to 1960
- Kirby Jackson, a former professional American football defensive back who played for the Los Angeles Rams and the Buffalo Bills, was born in Sturgis.
- Kid Thomas (musician) was born in Sturgis.
