= Mississippi Highway 182 =

Highway in Mississippi

Mississippi Highway 182

Route information
- Auxiliary route of US 82
- Maintained by MDOT
- Length: 42.880 mi (69.009 km) 7 sections
- Existed: 1994–present

Location
- Country: United States
- State: Mississippi
- Counties: Washington, Montgomery, Webster, Oktibbeha, Lowndes

Highway system
- Mississippi State Highway System; Interstate; US; State
← MS 178	→ MS 184

Mississippi Highway 182 (MS 182) designates the old two-lane highway for U.S. Route 82 (US 82) where the current US 82 occupies a new right-of-way. Some of the towns with a segment of MS 182 are Greenville, Winona, Kilmichael, Eupora, Mayhew, Starkville, and Columbus.

== Route description ==
=== Greenville ===
Mississippi Highway 182
- Location: Refuge

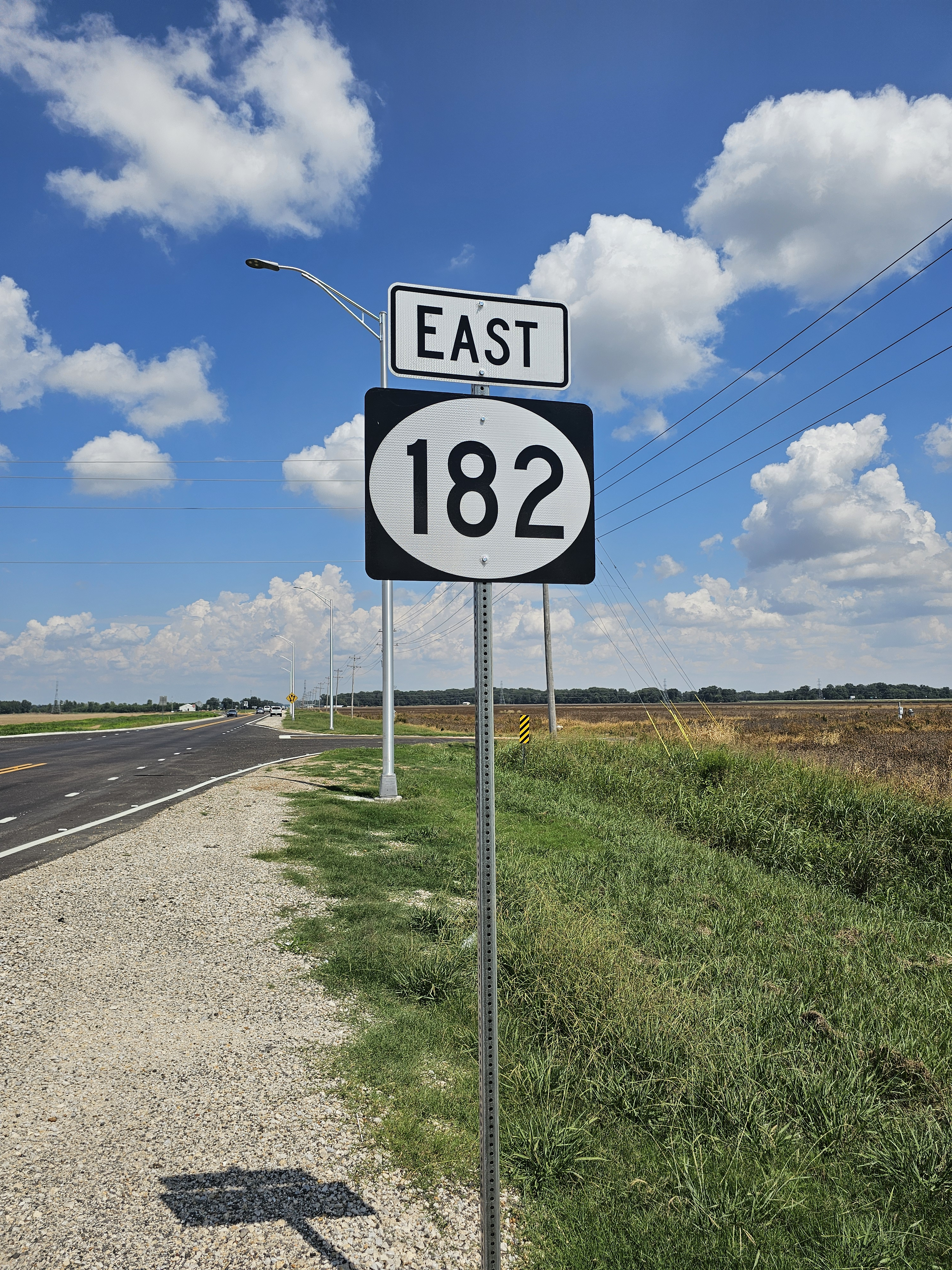
Western terminus of MS 182's Refuge segment

MS 182 begins at a junction with US 82 east of Refuge in Washington County, heading east on a four-lane divided road. The road enters Greenville. The highway intersects the southern terminus of MS 1 near the center of town and continues east through Greenville until it reaches its eastern terminus at US 82 in southwest Leland

=== Winona ===
Mississippi Highway 182
- Location: Winona
- Length: 1.007 mi (1.621 km)

MS 182 begins at an intersection with US 82 in the western part of Winona in Montgomery County. From here, the highway heads east along two-lane undivided Middleton Road, passing through wooded areas of homes. MS 182 comes to its eastern terminus at an intersection with US 51.

=== Kilmichael ===
Mississippi Highway 182
- Location: Kilmichael
- Length: 2.444 mi (3.933 km)

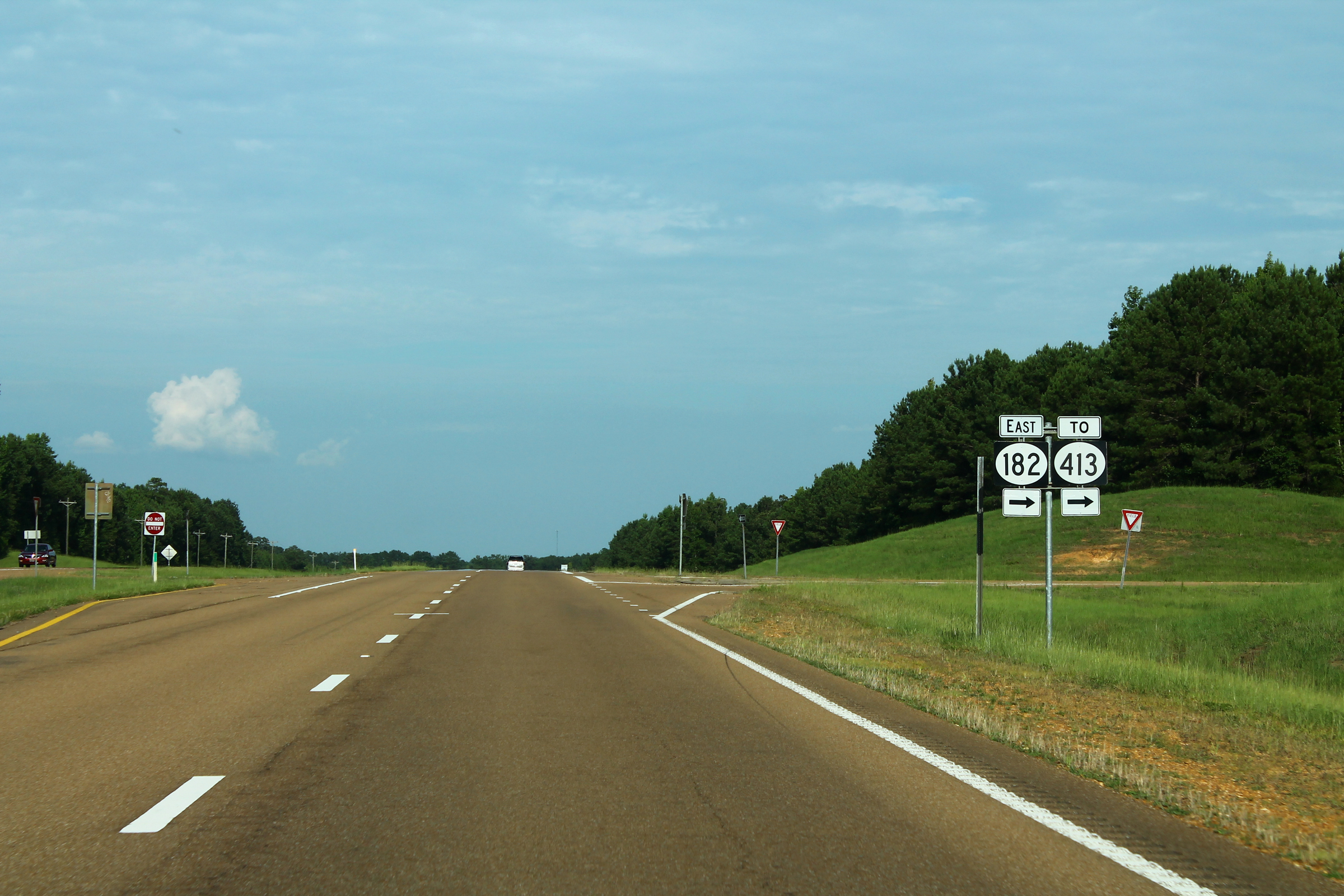
Western terminus of MS 182's Kilmichael segment

MS 182 begins at a junction with US 82 northwest of Kilmichael in Montgomery County, heading southeast on a two-lane undivided road through woodedland. The road enters Kilmichael and becomes North Rutherford Drive, passing through wooded areas with homes. The highway intersects the southern terminus of MS 745 near the center of town and continues past more residences on South Rutherford Drive. MS 182 comes to an intersection with the northern termini of both MS 413 and MS 745 and turns to the east. The highway runs through a mix of fields, trees, and homes before it reaches its eastern terminus at US 82 east of Kilmichael.

=== Eupora ===
Mississippi Highway 182
- Location: Eupora
- Length: 5.479 mi (8.818 km)

MS 182 begins at an intersection with US 82 west of Eupora in Webster County, heading northeast as a two-lane undivided road. The road passes through a mix of fields and woods with some homes before it curves east and enters Eupora. The highway becomes West Roane Avenue and runs through residential areas. MS 182 heads into the commercial downtown of Eupora, where it becomes East Roane Avenue and crosses MS 9. Past this intersection, the road continues past businesses a short distance to the north of the Columbus and Greenville Railway before it leaves Eupora. The highway becomes unnamed and runs through wooded areas with some fields and homes, curving northeast away from the railroad tracks. MS 182 comes to its eastern end at another intersection with US 82.

=== Starkville-Mayhew and western Columbus ===
Mississippi Highway 182
- Location: Starkville-Mayhew
- Length: 20.814 mi (33.497 km)

MS 182 begins at an intersection with US 82 west of Starkville in Oktibbeha County, heading southeast as a two-lane undivided road. The highway runs through forested areas with some fields and homes, passing through the community of Adaton. The road continues through rural areas and curves east. MS 182 enters Starkville and comes to an interchange with MS 25. At this interchange, the highway becomes a four-lane road called Dr. Martin Luther King, Jr. Drive West and passes commercial development before it narrows back to two lanes and runs through wooded areas with homes and businesses. The road continues east through more commercial areas as it passes to the north of downtown Starkville, with the name changing to Dr. Martin Luther King, Jr. Drive East at the Dr. Douglas L. Conner Drive intersection. MS 182 gains a center left-turn lane and intersects the southern terminus of MS 389 a short distance later. The highway passes more businesses and comes to a bridge over a Kansas City Southern Railway line. MS 182 widens into a four-lane divided highway and comes to an interchange with MS 12 on the eastern border of Starkville. After this, the road passes through the northern portion of the Mississippi State University campus.

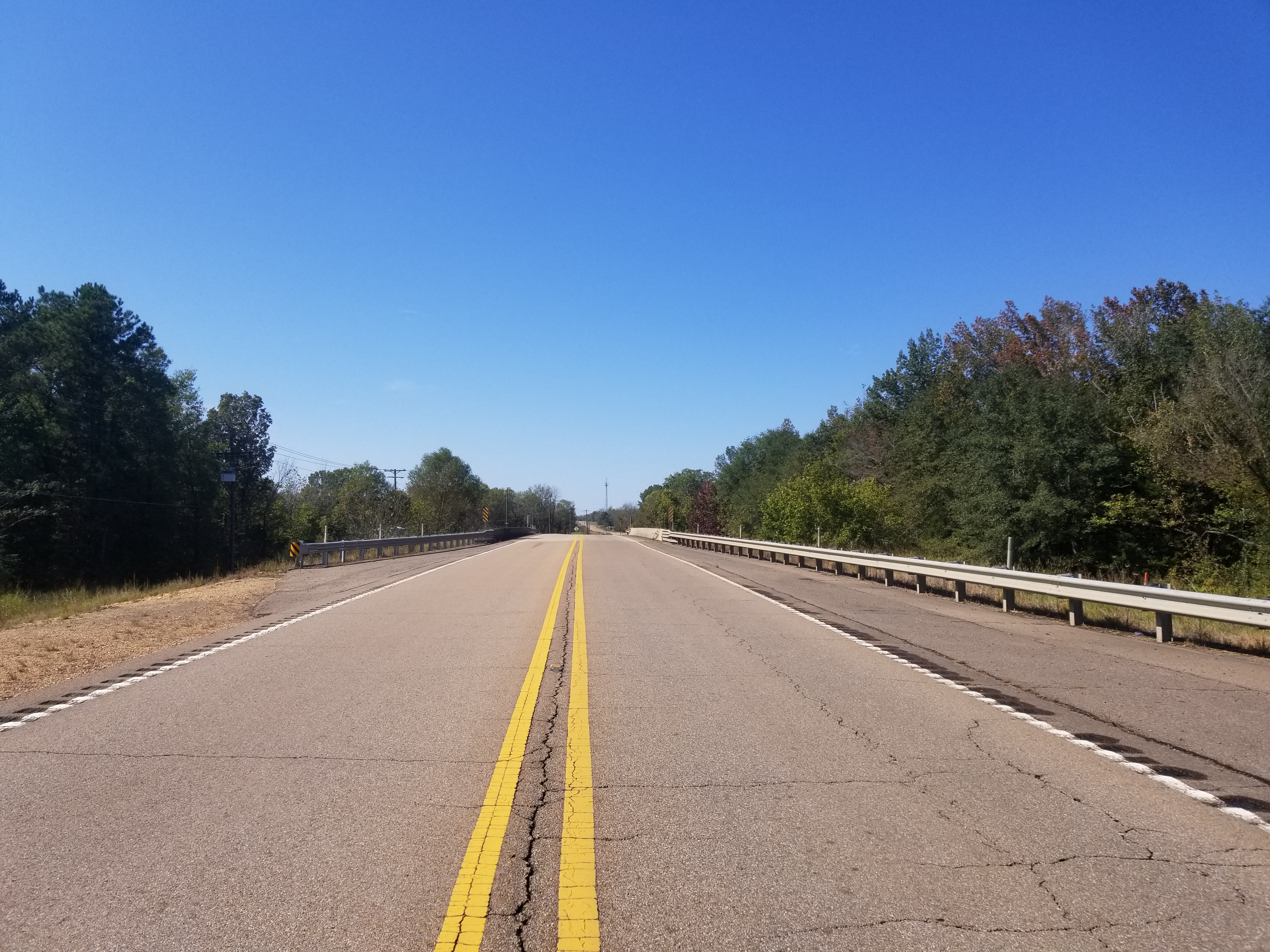
MS-182 looking west in Lowndes County

MS 182 becomes an unnamed divided highway and runs between fields to the north and residential and commercial development to the south of the road. The highway comes to an interchange with the US 82/MS 12/MS 25 freeway in Clayton Village, after which it narrows back into a two-lane undivided road that runs through rural land with some commercial development. The road passes to the south of the Mississippi State University Golf Course before it crosses under US 82/MS 12/MS 25 without an interchange. MS 182 runs through a mix of farm fields and woods with some homes as it heads into Lowndes County. The highway becomes South Frontage Road and reaches an interchange with US 45 Alt. Following this, the road continues through rural land before it reaches the community of Mayhew, where it heads to the north of the East Mississippi Community College Golden Triangle Campus and passes under a Kansas City Southern Railway line. MS 182 runs through woods before continuing straight through farmland. Before the road reaches the roadbed of the US 82/MS 12 freeway, the MS 182 designation formally ends with the roadbed continuing only as Frontage Road.

Mississippi Highway 182
- Location: Western Columbus
- Length: 2.951 mi (4.749 km)

After about 4 1/2 miles (7.2 km) of parallelling the freeway, the MS 182 resumes as a two-lane road continues east to an intersection with US 45. Past this intersection, the road becomes Old Highway 82 West and runs through wooded areas with some fields. MS 182 comes to its terminus just west of the Tennessee–Tombigbee Waterway to the west of Columbus, where the road turns south and becomes Old Macon Road.

=== Columbus-Alabama ===
Mississippi Highway 182
- Location: Columbus-Alabama state line
- Length: 10.185 mi (16.391 km)

MS 182 begins at a dead end along the western shore of a large island along the Tennessee–Tombigbee Waterway in Columbus, Lowndes County, heading east along two-lane undivided Island Road. The highway passes homes and businesses, turning northeast and passing over the eastern branch of the Tennessee–Tombigbee Waterway. After this bridge, MS 182 comes to an intersection with MS 69, at which point the highway turns southeast to form a concurrency with MS 69 along four-lane divided Main Street. The road soon curves east and heads into the commercial downtown of Columbus. The highway leaves the downtown area and continues past businesses and some homes, becoming a five-lane road with a center left-turn lane and crossing a Kansas City Southern Railway line. MS 69/MS 182 curves northeast, narrowing to three lanes, before turning back east and crossing an Alabama and Gulf Coast Railway line. The roadway continues through commercial areas and passes to the south of a park, becoming a four-lane undivided road, before crossing Luxapallila Creek. MS 69 splits from MS 182 by heading to the south, while MS 182 continues east along Alabama Street, a three-lane road with a center left-turn lane, past businesses along with a few residences. Farther east, the highway leaves Columbus and becomes a two-lane undivided, unnamed road that runs through woodland with some fields and development. The road runs near residential neighborhoods before it intersects Lee Stokes Road, which heads north to an interchange with US 82. MS 182 continues east to its terminus at the Alabama border, where the road continues into that state as CR-30 in Pickens County.

== Major intersections ==
County	Location	mi	km	Destinations	Notes
Washington	Refuge	0.000	0.000	US 82 / US 278 / MS 454 – Lake Village, Leland}	Western terminus, western terminus of MS 454
Washington	Greenville			MS 1 – Benoit	
Washington	Leland			US 82 / US 278 – Greenville, Indianola	Eastern terminus
Gap in route
Montgomery	Winona			US 82 (Dr. Martin Luther King, Jr. Boulevard) to I-55	Western terminus
Montgomery	Winona	1.007	1.621	US 51 (North Applegate Street) – Duck Hill, Downtown Winona, Vaiden	Eastern terminus
Montgomery	Gap in route				
Montgomery	Kilmichael			US 82	Western terminus
Montgomery	Kilmichael			MS 745 south (North Depot Avenue)	Northern terminus of MS 745
Montgomery	Kilmichael	1.797– 1.836	2.892– 2.955	MS 413 south (River Road) / MS 745 north (South Depot Avenue) – French Camp	Northern terminus of MS 413; southern terminus of MS 745
Montgomery	Kilmichael			US 82	Eastern terminus
Gap in route
Webster	Eupora			US 82	Western terminus
Webster	Eupora			MS 9 (Veterans Memorial Boulevard) – Calhoun City, Ackerman	
Webster	Eupora			US 82	Eastern terminus
Gap in route
Oktibbeha	Adaton			US 82	Western terminus
Oktibbeha	Starkville	6.770– 7.097	10.895– 11.422	MS 25 – Louisville	Interchange
Oktibbeha	Starkville			MS 389 north (North Jackson Street) – Pheba, Montpelier, Houston	
Oktibbeha	Starkville	10.104– 10.318	16.261– 16.605	MS 12 to US 82 – Ackerman	Interchange
Oktibbeha	Clayton Village	12.206– 12.467	19.644– 20.064	US 82 / MS 12 / MS 25 – Columbus, West Point, Winona, Louisville	Interchange
Lowndes	Mayhew	18.006– 18.594	28.978– 29.924	US 45 Alt. to US 82 east – Meridian, West Point	Interchange
Lowndes	Mayhew			Frontage Road	End of state maintenance
Lowndes	Gap in route				
Lowndes				Frontage Road	Beginning of state maintenance
Lowndes				US 45	
Lowndes	Columbus			Old Macon Road south	Eastern terminus
Lowndes	Columbus	Gap in route			
Lowndes	Columbus			Dead end at the Tennessee Tombigbee Waterway	Western terminus
Lowndes	Columbus			MS 69 north (Main Street) to US 45 / US 82	West end of MS 69 overlap
Lowndes	Columbus			MS 69 south (Idlewild Road) – Aliceville	East end of MS 69 overlap
Lowndes				CR 30 east	Alabama border, eastern terminus
1.000 mi = 1.609 km; 1.000 km = 0.621 mi: Concurrency terminus
