= Muldrow =

Muldrow could refer to:

- Muldrow (surname)
- Muldrow, Mississippi, U.S., an unincorporated community
- Muldrow, Oklahoma, U.S., a town
- Muldrow Glacier, a glacier in Alaska, U.S.
- Muldrow v. City of St. Louis, 2024 U.S. Supreme Court case
