= Double Springs, Mississippi =

Ghost town in the USA

- Ghost town
- Location within Mississippi Location within the United States
- Coordinates: 33°28′53″N 89°03′39″W
- Country: United States
- State: Mississippi
- County: Oktibbeha
- Elevation: 463 ft (141 m)
- Time zone: UTC-6 (Central (CST))
  - Summer (DST): UTC-5 (CDT)
- Area codes: 662 & 471
- GNIS feature ID: 669348

Double Springs was a community in Oktibbeha County, Mississippi. A US Post office was located there from November 1, 1857, through August 13, 1904. It was founded around 1835, and at one time was as large as Starkville. It was on the pony express service from Columbus to Greensboro. During reconstruction, it was home to one of three main groups of the Ku Klux Klan in the county. In 1887 the Old Southern Railroad built a track and most of the population and businesses moved to Maben, Mississippi, abandoning Double Springs.
