= Randle Nettles =

Reconstruction-era Mississippi politifcian

Randle Nettles (born October 1836) was an American farmer, Baptist preacher, state legislator, and state militia member during the Reconstruction era in Mississippi. He served on the county Board of Supervisors from 1870 to 1872. He represented Oktibbeha County in the Mississippi House of Representatives from 1870 to 1873. He was appointed as an officer to the state militia.

== See also ==
- African American officeholders from the end of the Civil War until before 1900
