= Benjamin Chiles =

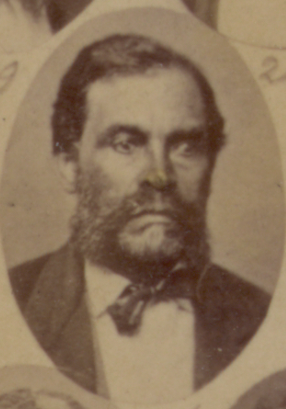

Benjamin Chiles (June 22, 1825 – March 20, 1911) was a state legislator in Mississippi. He represented Oktibbeha County from 1874 to 1878.

He was born a slave in South Carolina and relocated to Mississippi in 1837, with John M. Chiles.

== See also ==
- African American officeholders from the end of the Civil War until before 1900
