= Mississippi Highway 69 =

Highway in Mississippi

Mississippi Highway 69
- MS 69 highlighted in red

Route information
- Maintained by MDOT
- Length: 15.56 mi (25.04 km)
- Existed: c. 1941–present

Major junctions
- South end: SR 14 near Forreston
- North end: US 45 / US 82 in Columbus

Location
- Country: United States
- State: Mississippi
- County: Lowndes

Highway system
- Mississippi State Highway System; Interstate; US; State
| ← I-69 | → US 72 |

Mississippi Highway 69 (MS 69) is a state highway in eastern Mississippi. The route starts at the Alabama state line, and travels northwestward to Columbus. MS 69 then goes through downtown Columbus, and ends at U.S. Route 45 (US 45) and US 82 in the west side of the town. Before the road was designated as MS 69 in 1941, it was a gravel road from Columbus to the state line. The road was paved in asphalt in 1953. In 1992, US 82 was realigned, and MS 69 was extended through Columbus to its current northern terminus.

== Route description ==
Traffic volume on Mississippi Highway 69
| Location | Volume |
|---|---|
| Northwest of Weaver Road | 2,100 |
| Southeast of Gipson Lane | 4,700 |
| North of Temple Drive | 7,600 |
| North of Cooper Road | 14,000 |
| South of Airline Road | 13,900 |
| East of Baseball Field Road | 20,000 |
| West of North 24th Street | 17,000 |
| East of 6th Street | 16,000 |
| East of 2nd Street | 11,000 |
| North of Moores Creek Road | 12,000 |
Data was measured in 2016 in terms of AADT; Source:

MS 69 starts at the Alabama state line, where Alabama State Route 14 ends. The route turns northwest at Spurlock Road. It travels through the forest, intersecting Weaver Road and Halbert Road. MS 69 moves westward for a short period between Concord Road and East Minnie Vaughn Road. The road then curves slowly towards Columbus, as small streets begin to appear. At Pickensville Road, MS 69 travels north into Columbus, and intersects Fabritek Drive, the entrance to Columbus-Lowndes County Airport. At Yorkville Road, the road meets MS 795's eastern terminus. It soon crosses over the McCrary Vernon Creek and the Alabama Southern Railroad. At MS 182, MS 69 becomes concurrent with it and travels westward. The road soon crosses over Luxapalila Creek and enters downtown Columbus. MS 69 and MS 182 changes into a divided highway at Thirteenth Street. The street then intersects Fifth Street, which becomes US 45 past US 82. MS 182 continues westward on Island Road, while MS 69 travels northwestward. The route ends at US 45 and US 82 at a diamond interchange. The road continues to East Plymouth Road, where it ends at a three-way junction.

All of MS 69 is located in Lowndes County. The route is legally defined in Mississippi Code § 65-3-3, and all of it is maintained by the Mississippi Department of Transportation (MDOT).

== History ==
A gravel road from Columbus to the Mississippi–Alabama state line has existed since 1928, and it was designated as MS 69 by 1941. A $296,187.71 (equivalent to $3,588,048 in 2024) contract awarded by the Mississippi State Highway Commission in 1951 was used to grade the road, add drainage, culverts, and bridges to the route. The road was paved with asphalt by 1953, after being proposed four years earlier by the city of Columbus' Chamber of Commerce. The highway caught on fire in 1957, after a wagon carrying coal tar spilled its contents, destroying multiple telephone lines. In 1958, the northern terminus was rerouted out of downtown Columbus, to east of US 82 and MS 50's intersection. In 1992, US 82 was realigned to the bypass around Columbus, and MS 69 was extended through Columbus to a diamond interchange in the western part of the town.

== Major intersections ==
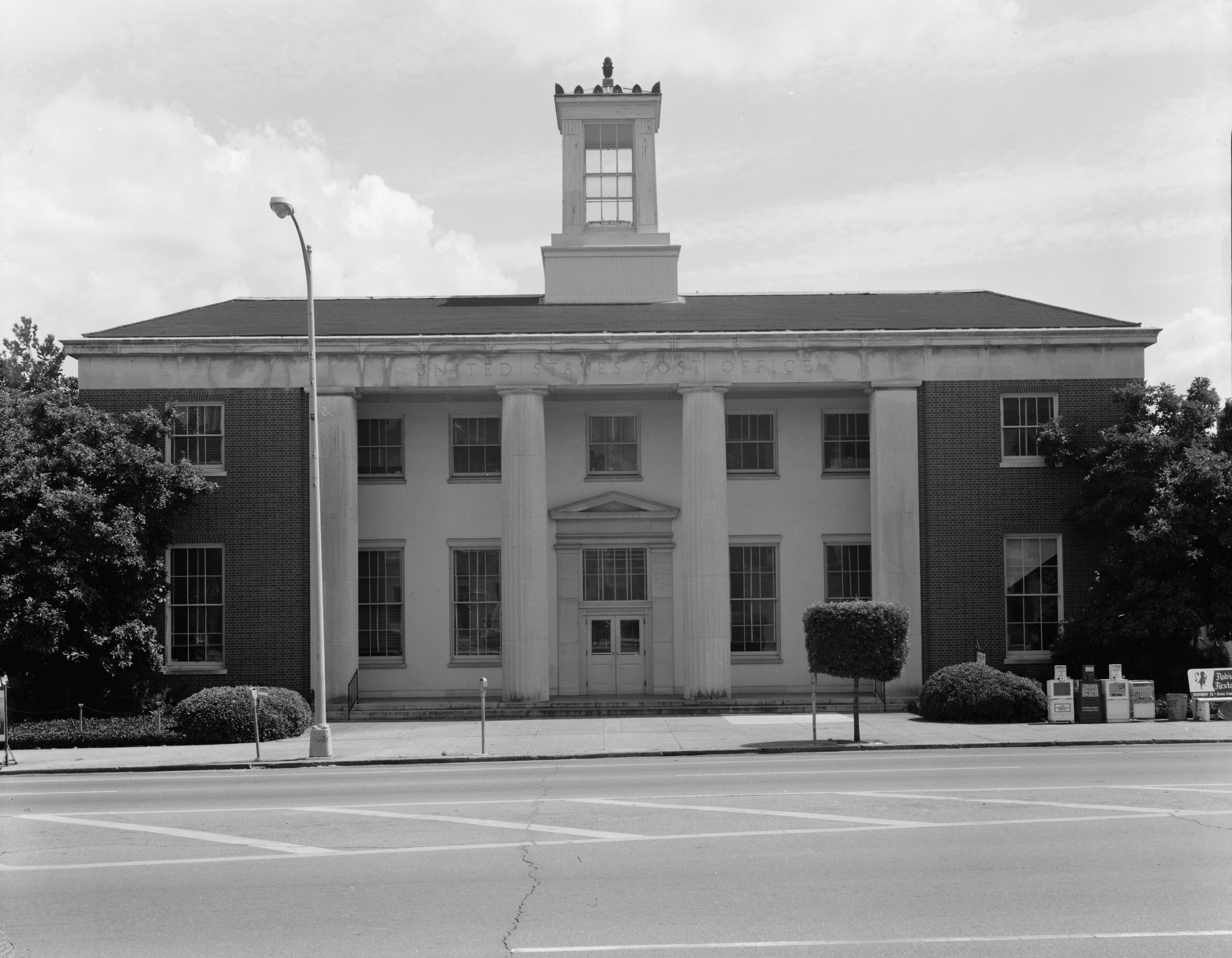
Post office of Columbus, located on MS 69 and MS 182

The entire route is in Lowndes County.

| Location | mi | km | Destinations | Notes |
|---|---|---|---|---|
| | 0.0 | 0.0 | SR 14 east – Aliceville | Alabama state line; southern terminus |
| Columbus | 10.3 | 16.6 | Fabritek Drive – Columbus-Lowndes County Airport | |
| Columbus | 11.3 | 18.2 | MS 795 south (West Yorkville Road) | Northern terminus of MS 795 |
| Columbus | 12.5 | 20.1 | MS 182 east – New Hope | Southern end of MS 182 concurrency |
| Columbus | 15.1 | 24.3 | MS 182 west – Lowndes County Industrial Park and Port | Northern end of MS 182 concurrency |
| Columbus | 15.4– 15.6 | 24.8– 25.1 | US 45 / US 82 (MS 12 / MS 50) – Starkville, Meridian, Tuscaloosa, Aberdeen | Diamond interchange; northern terminus |
1.000 mi = 1.609 km; 1.000 km = 0.621 mi: Concurrency terminus
