= Morgantown, Mississippi =

Morgantown is the name of three unincorporated communities in Mississippi, United States:

- Morgantown, Adams County, Mississippi, a census-designated place
- Morgantown, Marion County, Mississippi
- Morgantown, Oktibbeha County, Mississippi
