= Kid Thomas =

Kid Thomas may refer to:

- Kid Thomas Valentine (1896–1987), jazz trumpeter and bandleader
- Kid Thomas (musician) (Louis Thomas Watts) (1934–1970), blues and rock and roll musician
