= Caeser Simmons =

American politician

Caeser Simmons was a state legislator in Mississippi. He represented Oktibbeha County from 1870 to 1878.

Cesorea Simmons (1863–1918) was his daughter with Arabella Outlaw.

He was referred to as a railroad agent in testimony about election related disturbances.
