= Council Bluff =

Council Bluff may refer to:

- Council Bluffs, Iowa
  - Council Bluffs Municipal Airport
- Council Bluff, Nebraska, the site of Fort Atkinson
- Council Bluff Lake and Council Bluff Recreation Area in Missouri
- Council Bluff, a location in DeKalb County, Alabama
- A Choctaw council house near Agency, Mississippi

== See also ==
- Council Bluffs & Nebraska Ferry Company
