= Robinson Road =

Robinson Road may refer to

- Robinson Road, Hong Kong
- Robinson Road (Mississippi), a historical road in the US state of Mississippi
- Robinson Road, Singapore
- Former name of Nathan Road in Hong Kong
