= 1956 United States presidential election in Mississippi =

- November 6, 1956

Nominee	Adlai Stevenson	Dwight D. Eisenhower	Unpledged electors
Party	Democratic	Republican	Dixiecrat
Alliance		Black and Tan Grand Old Party
Home state	Illinois	Pennsylvania (Note: Although he was born in Texas and grew up in Kansas before his military career, at the time of his election Eisenhower was president of Columbia University and was, officially, a resident of New York. During his first term as president, he moved his private residence to Gettysburg, Pennsylvania, and officially changed his residency to Pennsylvania.)
Running mate	Estes Kefauver	Richard Nixon
Electoral vote	8	0	0
Popular vote	144,498	60,685	42,966
Percentage	58.23%	24.46%	17.31%

Stevenson
30–40%
40–50%
50–60%
60–70%
70–80%
80–90%
Eisenhower
30–40%
40–50%
50–60%
Unpledged
30–40%
40–50%
50–60%
President before election
Dwight D. Eisenhower
Republican
Elected President
Dwight D. Eisenhower
Republican

The 1956 United States presidential election in Mississippi was held on November 6, 1956. Mississippi voters chose eight representatives, or electors to the Electoral College, who voted for president and vice president.

Ever since the end of Reconstruction, Mississippi had been a one-party state dominated by the Democratic Party. The Republican Party was virtually nonexistent as a result of disenfranchisement among African Americans and poor whites, including voter intimidation against those who refused to vote Democratic.

From the time of Henry A. Wallace's appointment as vice president and the 1943 Detroit race riots, however, the northern left wing of the Democratic Party became committed to restoring black political rights, a policy vehemently opposed by all Southern Democrats as an infringement upon "states' rights". Consequently, the four states with the highest proportions of (disenfranchised) African-Americans in the populations listed South Carolina Governor James Strom Thurmond instead of national Democratic nominee Harry S. Truman as the "Democratic" nominee in the 1948 presidential election. Although Thurmond easily carried South Carolina, Mississippi, Alabama and Louisiana, Truman won the election.

Nevertheless, demands for civil rights legislation continued to intensify during the following eight years, although the pressing issue of the Korean War meant that Southern Democrats did not run a third-party ticket in 1952; however dissatisfaction with Democrat Adlai Stevenson on civil rights meant Dwight Eisenhower (listed as an "Independent" on the 1952 Mississippi ballot) gained considerable support from the exclusively white electorate of black belt counties, despite having a virtually identical position on civil rights.

After the landmark Brown v. Board of Education decision of 1954, however, Mississippi's rulers realized they could not rely on either major party to enforce segregation and white supremacy. The Citizens' Councils sought to map a regional caucus to deal with this issue, but it feared a split as had occurred in 1948. Nevertheless, the Citizens' Councils did place a slate of unpledged electors on the ballot alongside Eisenhower and Stevenson electors, although state officials, especially incumbent Governor James P. Coleman, strongly opposed them.

As of 2024, this is the last time that Clarke County, Lauderdale County, Lamar County, Lincoln County, Lowndes County, Newton County, Rankin County, Scott County, and Simpson County voted for a Democratic presidential candidate.

== Polls ==
Source	Ranking	As of
Fort Worth Star-Telegram	Safe D	November 2, 1956
The Clarion-Ledger	Safe D	November 4, 1956
The Daily Herald	Safe D	November 5, 1956

== Results ==
1956 United States presidential election in Mississippi
Party	Candidate	Votes	Percentage	Electoral votes
Democrat	Adlai Stevenson II	144,498	58.23%	8
Mississippi Republican/Black and Tan GOP	Dwight D. Eisenhower (incumbent)	60,685 (Note: Eisenhower vote is a fusion of 56,372 Mississippi Republican Party votes and 4,313 Mississippi Black and Tan Grand Old Party votes. The two slates had different electors so their votes did not constitute a true fusion.)	24.46%	0
Dixiecrat	Unpledged electors	42,966	17.31%	0
Totals		248,149	100.00%	8

=== Results by county ===
County	Adlai Stevenson Democratic		Dwight D. Eisenhower Republican		Unpledged Electors States’ Rights		Margin		Total votes cast
County	#	%	#	%	#	%	#	%	Total votes cast
Adams	1,279	31.24%	1,664	40.64%	1,151	28.11%	-385	-9.40%	4,094
Alcorn	3,143	77.19%	827	20.31%	102	2.50%	2,316	56.88%	4,072
Amite	802	46.74%	255	14.86%	659	38.40%	143 (Note: In this county where Eisenhower ran third behind both Stevenson and the unpledged slate, margin given is Stevenson vote minus unpledged vote and percentage margin Stevenson percentage minus unpledged percentage.)	8.34%	1,716
Attala	1,793	67.46%	445	16.74%	420	15.80%	1,348	50.72%	2,658
Benton	786	83.26%	108	11.44%	50	5.30%	678	71.82%	944
Bolivar	1,176	33.49%	754	21.48%	1,581	45.03%	-405	-11.54%	3,511
Calhoun	1,763	79.52%	301	13.58%	153	6.90%	1,462	65.94%	2,217
Carroll	1,080	69.63%	234	15.09%	237	15.28%	843	54.35%	1,551
Chickasaw	1,650	80.25%	231	11.24%	175	8.51%	1,419	69.01%	2,056
Choctaw	1,117	79.56%	221	15.74%	66	4.70%	896	63.82%	1,404
Claiborne	339	41.24%	191	23.24%	292	35.52%	47	5.72%	822
Clarke	1,763	73.24%	500	20.77%	144	5.98%	1,263	52.47%	2,407
Clay	1,225	54.52%	410	18.25%	612	27.24%	613	27.28%	2,247
Coahoma	1,677	50.83%	1,082	32.80%	540	16.37%	595	18.03%	3,299
Copiah	1,270	55.12%	387	16.80%	647	28.08%	623	27.04%	2,304
Covington	1,382	67.38%	386	18.82%	283	13.80%	996	48.56%	2,051
DeSoto	1,236	66.96%	398	21.56%	212	11.48%	838	45.40%	1,846
Forrest	1,928	32.06%	2,256	37.52%	1,829	30.42%	-328	-5.46%	6,013
Franklin	862	55.83%	177	11.46%	505	32.71%	357	23.12%	1,544
George	1,150	69.24%	403	24.26%	108	6.50%	747	44.98%	1,661
Greene	734	59.72%	351	28.56%	144	11.72%	383	31.16%	1,229
Grenada	949	43.37%	407	18.60%	832	38.03%	117	5.34%	2,188
Hancock	1,179	44.09%	1,421	53.14%	74	2.77%	-242	-9.05%	2,674
Harrison	6,549	50.37%	5,742	44.17%	710	5.46%	807	6.20%	13,001
Hinds	7,104	35.03%	7,015	34.59%	6,159	30.37%	89	0.44%	20,278
Holmes	872	40.77%	215	10.05%	1,052	49.18%	-180	-8.41%	2,139
Humphreys	576	44.51%	127	9.81%	591	45.67%	-15	-1.16%	1,294
Issaquena	172	59.52%	42	14.53%	75	25.95%	97	33.57%	289
Itawamba	2,310	86.68%	298	11.18%	57	2.14%	2,012	75.50%	2,665
Jackson	3,882	56.21%	2,692	38.98%	332	4.81%	1,190	17.23%	6,906
Jasper	1,958	80.08%	287	11.74%	200	8.18%	1,671	68.34%	2,445
Jefferson	440	45.74%	189	19.65%	333	34.62%	107	11.12%	962
Jefferson Davis	1,049	73.41%	156	10.92%	224	15.68%	825	57.73%	1,429
Jones	5,137	62.17%	2,463	29.81%	663	8.02%	2,674	32.36%	8,263
Kemper	1,586	87.00%	173	9.49%	64	3.51%	1,413	77.51%	1,823
Lafayette	1,968	72.86%	575	21.29%	158	5.85%	1,393	51.57%	2,701
Lamar	805	46.86%	429	24.97%	484	28.17%	321	18.69%	1,718
Lauderdale	5,414	59.32%	2,817	30.86%	896	9.82%	2,597	28.46%	9,127
Lawrence	1,025	67.48%	276	18.17%	218	14.35%	749	49.31%	1,519
Leake	2,475	82.53%	220	7.34%	304	10.14%	2,171	72.39%	2,999
Lee	3,883	75.30%	929	18.01%	345	6.69%	2,954	57.29%	5,157
Leflore	1,769	49.30%	887	24.72%	932	25.98%	837	23.32%	3,588
Lincoln	1,942	51.47%	848	22.48%	983	26.05%	959	25.42%	3,773
Lowndes	2,308	55.94%	1,205	29.21%	613	14.86%	1,103	26.73%	4,126
Madison	996	41.59%	377	15.74%	1,022	42.67%	-26	-1.08%	2,395
Marion	1,751	57.75%	611	20.15%	670	22.10%	1,081	35.65%	3,032
Marshall	1,192	70.37%	287	16.94%	215	12.69%	905	53.43%	1,694
Monroe	3,630	78.50%	705	15.25%	289	6.25%	2,925	63.25%	4,624
Montgomery	1,134	63.74%	278	15.63%	367	20.63%	767	43.11%	1,779
Neshoba	2,827	77.90%	502	13.83%	300	8.27%	2,325	64.07%	3,629
Newton	2,359	75.46%	360	11.52%	407	13.02%	1,952	62.44%	3,126
Noxubee	690	52.27%	257	19.47%	373	28.26%	317	24.01%	1,320
Oktibbeha	1,552	58.79%	702	26.59%	386	14.62%	850	32.20%	2,640
Panola	1,741	66.17%	519	19.73%	371	14.10%	1,222	46.44%	2,631
Pearl River	1,274	44.73%	1,129	39.64%	445	15.63%	145	5.09%	2,848
Perry	581	52.82%	347	31.55%	172	15.64%	234	21.27%	1,100
Pike	1,714	41.74%	1,210	29.47%	1,182	28.79%	504	12.27%	4,106
Pontotoc	2,320	82.50%	335	11.91%	157	5.58%	1,985	70.59%	2,812
Prentiss	1,942	80.95%	383	15.96%	74	3.08%	1,559	64.99%	2,399
Quitman	954	63.64%	276	18.41%	269	17.95%	678	45.23%	1,499
Rankin	1,537	49.76%	556	18.00%	996	32.24%	541	17.52%	3,089
Scott	2,077	65.50%	503	15.86%	591	18.64%	1,486	46.86%	3,171
Sharkey	308	37.02%	211	25.36%	313	37.62%	-5	-0.60%	832
Simpson	2,140	67.11%	467	14.64%	582	18.25%	1,558	48.86%	3,189
Smith	2,055	80.81%	277	10.89%	211	8.30%	1,778	69.92%	2,543
Stone	761	65.15%	293	25.09%	114	9.76%	468	40.06%	1,168
Sunflower	1,585	50.80%	520	16.67%	1,015	32.53%	570	18.27%	3,120
Tallahatchie	1,969	73.28%	341	12.69%	377	14.03%	1,592	59.25%	2,687
Tate	1,414	80.85%	171	9.78%	164	9.38%	1,243	71.07%	1,749
Tippah	2,569	86.94%	287	9.71%	99	3.35%	2,282	77.23%	2,955
Tishomingo	1,577	72.67%	516	23.78%	77	3.55%	1,061	48.89%	2,170
Tunica	470	56.22%	200	23.92%	166	19.86%	270	32.30%	836
Union	2,882	82.48%	427	12.22%	185	5.29%	2,455	70.26%	3,494
Walthall	1,143	66.26%	306	17.74%	276	16.00%	837	48.52%	1,725
Warren	1,857	34.85%	2,419	45.40%	1,052	19.74%	-562	-10.55%	5,328
Washington	2,722	49.58%	1,973	35.94%	795	14.48%	749	13.64%	5,490
Wayne	1,493	70.13%	373	17.52%	263	12.35%	1,120	52.61%	2,129
Webster	1,412	80.92%	188	10.77%	145	8.31%	1,224	70.15%	1,745
Wilkinson	260	30.55%	240	28.20%	351	41.25%	-91	-10.70%	851
Winston	2,132	78.82%	361	13.35%	212	7.84%	1,771	65.47%	2,705
Yalobusha	1,015	59.85%	414	24.41%	267	15.74%	601	35.44%	1,696
Yazoo	911	29.50%	370	11.98%	1,807	58.52%	-896	-29.02%	3,088
Totals	144,498	58.23%	60,685	24.46%	42,966	17.31%	83,813	33.77%	248,149

==== Counties that flipped from Republican to Unpledged ====
- Bolivar
- Madison
- Sharkey
- Wilkinson

==== Counties that flipped from Republican to Democratic ====
- Claiborne
- Hinds
- Jefferson
- LeFlore
- Lowndes
- Noxubee
- Pike
- Washington

==== Counties that flipped from Democratic to Unpledged ====
- Holmes
- Humphreys
- Yazoo

==== Counties that flipped from Democratic to Republican ====
- Hancock

== Analysis ==
Ultimately Mississippi was to vote for Stevenson by a convincing margin of 33.76 points, as the 1952 Eisenhower vote in the black belt was substantially turned over to the unpledged slate, whilst Stevenson held almost all of the vote he received in 1952. Mississippi was Stevenson's second-strongest state behind Georgia and in terms of popular vote Eisenhower's weakest.

As of the 2024 presidential race, 1956 is the last time a Democrat has won a majority of the vote in Mississippi. The party's increasing embrace of civil rights for blacks would turn the state over to another unpledged slate in 1960, then overwhelmingly to the Republican nominee Barry Goldwater in 1964, who had been one of only six Republicans to vote against the Civil Rights Act. With the enfranchisement of the state's blacks via the Voting Rights Act, the majority white population would overwhelmingly move toward the Republican Party. Since 1964 only Jimmy Carter in 1976 has carried Mississippi for the Democratic Party—and even Southern evangelical Carter's performance was his third-weakest in the extended South (Note: "Extended South" includes all the former Confederate States, the five border slave states, and Oklahoma, which gained statehood only in 1907 but which had practiced slavery before the Civil War.) behind his narrow losses in Virginia and Oklahoma.

No Democratic presidential nominee has carried the following counties since Stevenson did so in this election: Lamar, Lauderdale, Lincoln, Lowndes, Newton, Rankin, Scott and Simpson. Stevenson is also the last Democrat to carry Clarke County outright, but Jimmy Carter and Ronald Reagan tied there with 3,303 votes apiece in 1980. Oktibbeha County would not vote Democratic again until Barack Obama carried it in 2008. This is also the last election in which the Democratic nominee carried Mississippi without winning the presidency or that a Republican won two terms without ever winning the state.
