= Mississippi Highway 454 =

Highway in Mississippi

Mississippi Highway 454
- MS 454 highlighted in red

Route information
- Maintained by MDOT
- Length: 4.803 mi (7.730 km)
- Existed: 1953–present

Major junctions
- West end: US 82 / US 278 / MS 182 near Greenville
- East end: MS 1 near Wayside

Location
- Country: United States
- State: Mississippi
- Counties: Washington

Highway system
- Mississippi State Highway System; Interstate; US; State
← MS 450	→ MS 462

Mississippi Highway 454 (MS 454) is a state highway in western Mississippi. MS 454 starts at US 82 and US 278. It travels eastward to its eastern terminus at MS 1. The road that became MS 454 was constructed in 1940 and opened the next year. MS 454 was designated in 1953, and has not changed significantly since.

== Route description ==
MS 454 starts at an intersection with US 82, US 278, and MS 182 and travels southeast. The road soon turns east, as it passes through vast farmland and continues eastward. Less than one mile (1.6 km) later, the road intersects Tanya Road and West Lake Lee Road, and passes by a small group of trees. About halfway through the route, the road crosses a creek, and travels through small forests. MS 454 ends at a T-intersection with MS 1. The whole highway is a paved, two-lane road. MS 454 is legally defined in Mississippi Code § 65-3-3. In 2012, Mississippi Department of Transportation (MDOT) calculated as many as 4,500 vehicles traveling west of MS 1, and as few as 3,100 vehicles traveling east of US 82/USv278.

== History ==
A road from US 82 to MS 1 was constructed during 1940, and opened in 1941. The road was unsigned, and was already paved in concrete. It was designated as MS 454 by 1953. By 1999, US 278 became concurrent with US 82 through MS 454's western terminus. A bypass around Greenville was planned in the 1990s, and construction began in 2008, before funding stopped due to the recession, construction restarted and the project was completed in 2025. As part of the project, MS 454 was realigned, with a new bridge being built for the new interchange at MS 454's western terminus. As the bridge for MS 454 was built prior to work stopping on the project, it was unused, with no roads connecting to it for over a decade prior to the project being completed.

== Major intersections ==
The entire route is in Washington County.

Location	mi	km	Destinations	Notes
Refuge	0.000	0.000	US 82 / US 278 / MS 182 – Leland, Greenwood, Lake Village, AR	Western terminus
Swiftwater	4.803	7.730	MS 1 – Greenville, Wayside	Eastern terminus
1.000 mi = 1.609 km; 1.000 km = 0.621 mi
