= Sessums, Mississippi =

- Unincorporated community
- Location within Mississippi Location within the United States
- Coordinates: 33°24′58″N 88°42′50″W
- Country: United States
- State: Mississippi
- County: Oktibbeha
- Elevation: 269 ft (82 m)
- Time zone: UTC-6 (Central (CST))
  - Summer (DST): UTC-5 (CDT)
- ZIP code: 39759
- Area code: 662
- GNIS feature ID: 677521

Sessums is an unincorporated community located in Oktibbeha County, Mississippi. Sessums is approximately 13 miles (21 km) east-southeast of Starkville and approximately 6 miles (9.7 km) west of Artesia.

== History ==
Sessums is located on the former Columbus branch of the Mobile and Ohio Railroad. In 1900, the community had a population of 27.

Sessums is named for Colonel Solomon David Sessums, who owned much of the surrounding land. The Sessums family operated a horse track near their home.

The community was once home to a church, school, multiple stores, and a cotton gin.

The community was once known as a dairy center for Oktibbeha County.

A post office operated under the name Sessums from 1876 to 2000.
