= Mississippi Highway 465 =

Highway in Mississippi

Mississippi Highway 465
- MS 465 highlighted in red

Route information
- Maintained by MDOT
- Length: 38.789 mi (62.425 km)
- Existed: 1956–present

Major junctions
- South end: US 61 near Redwood
- North end: MS 1 near Fitler

Location
- Country: United States
- State: Mississippi
- Counties: Warren, Issaquena

Highway system
- Mississippi State Highway System; Interstate; US; State
← MS 463	→ MS 467

Mississippi Highway 465 (MS 465) is a highway in the southern region of the Mississippi Delta. The highway starts at U.S. Route 61 (US 61) near Redwood. It travels westward towards the Mississippi River, and then northwards to the village of Eagle Bend. The highway then traverses on the Mississippi River levee on a one-lane road. Later, MS 465 leaves the levee, continues northward, and soon ends at MS 1.

The highway was built around 1956, as a gravel road from US 61 in Vicksburg, to MS 1 in Fitler. The southern terminus was moved in 1960 to near Redwood, and the highway was completely paved by 1984.

== Route description ==
Traffic volume on Mississippi Highway 465
Location	Volume
Southwest of Old Twin Lake Road	800
East of Section Road	800
East of McNair Drive	800
South of Goose Lake Road	90
Northeast of Levee Maintenance Road	130
South of MS 1	100
Data was measured in 2014 in terms of AADT; Source:

MS 465 is located in Warren and Issaquena counties. The route is legally defined in Mississippi Code § 65-3-3, and is maintained by the Mississippi Department of Transportation. The section from US 61 to the Warren–Issaquena county line was designated "William W. "Bill" Ramsey Memorial Highway" in 2009.

The highway starts at a T-intersection with US 61, a part of the Great River Road, north of Redwood. It then travels southwestward, adjacent to the Yazoo River. MS 465 then intersects Old Twin Lake Road in the village of Twin Lake, which is surrounded by a mix of forests and farmland. The road continues traveling southwestward, slightly elevated above the farmland. It then travels over a bridge, and soon turns westward, east of the Warren–Issaquena county line.

MS 465 continues to journey westward in Issaquena County, following the Yazoo River while surrounded by multiple smaller ponds. Next, the highway crosses over the Steele Bayou, and soon follows the Old Channel. The highway continues westward, crossing another bridge and passing nearby a cemetery. MS 465 intersects Levee Road, and then re-enters Warren County.

Once re-entering Warren County, MS 465 intersects Paw Paw Road and turns northward. The forest soon changes into farmland as the road nears Eagle Bend. MS 465 then intersects Eagle Lake Shore Road near Eagle Lake, and it begins traveling around the eastern shore of the lake. The highway intersects minor streets around the village and crosses the Muddy Brook toward the center of the village. It then travels northwestward to Brunswick, where the road begins to narrow. MS 465 soon crosses a cattle guard and turns northeastward toward the levee. Once on the levee, MS 465 travels a one-lane road for 11 miles (18 km). Near Bellevue, the road intersects Laney Camp Road and re-enters Issaquena County after crossing another cattle guard.

In Issaquena County, the route continues traveling northeastward over the levee. Past Jackson Road, the highway shifts slightly to the east. MS 465 then travels around Albemarle Lake, intersecting Goose Lake Road. About four miles (6.4 km) later, the route turns northeastward, no longer concurrent with the levee. The road crosses a cattle guard and becomes a two-lane road again. The highway becomes surrounded by forests until it intersects Mannie Road, where it begins traveling northward into farmland. Past the village of New Fitler, the road turns northward, adjacent to the Steele Bayou. MS 465 continues northward to its northern terminus, MS 1, another section of the Great River Road, at a T-intersection.

== History ==
MS 465 first appeared as a gravel road on the state map in 1956, connecting US 61 near Vicksburg to MS 1 in Fitler. A year later, a section of the highway became paved in northwest Warren County, and its southern terminus was realigned to north of Vicksburg by 1958. The terminus continued to shift north to parallel the Yazoo River the next two years, ending near Redwood. The southern half of the route was fully paved by 1964, and the northern by 1984. The route has not changed significantly since. The route was proposed to be part of the Great River Road, but it was not included in the most recent reiteration of the route.

The highway has been prone to flooding, due to it being in the Mississippi River's vicinity. The floods have impacted the Eagle Bend area, one of the communities on MS 465. In May 2011, the highway was closed in preparation for floods, which were already impacting the region. It re-opened in June, after repairs and cleanups were done to the road. MS 465 was closed again in early January 2016, as waters approached flood levels again. People were told to evacuate Eagle Lake via the northern section of MS 465. After waters receded by the end of January, the highway was re-opened to the public.

== Major intersections ==
County	Location	mi	km	Destinations	Notes
Warren		0.000	0.000	US 61 / Great River Road – Rolling Fork, Vicksburg	Southern terminus
Issaquena	No major junctions				
Warren	No major junctions				
Issaquena		38.789	62.425	MS 1 / Great River Road – Mayersville, Fitler, Onward	Northern terminus
1.000 mi = 1.609 km; 1.000 km = 0.621 mi
