= Kirby Jackson =

American football player (born 1965)

No. 36, 47
- Position: Cornerback

Personal information
- Born: February 2, 1965 (age 61); Sturgis, Mississippi, U.S.
- Listed height: 5 ft 10 in (1.78 m)
- Listed weight: 179 lb (81 kg)

Career information
- High school: Sturgis
- College: Mississippi State
- NFL draft: 1987: 5th round, 129th overall pick

Career history
- New York Jets (1987)*; Los Angeles Rams (1987); Buffalo Bills (1987–1993); Seattle Seahawks (1994)
- * Offseason or practice squad member only

Career NFL statistics
- Interceptions: 10
- Fumble recoveries: 2
- Sacks: 1
- Stats at Pro Football Reference

Kirby Jackson (born February 2, 1965) is an American former professional football player who was a defensive back in the National Football League (NFL) for the Los Angeles Rams in 1987 and the Buffalo Bills from 1988 to 1992. He helped the Bills win four AFC Championships, and was a member of four Bills Super Bowl teams. He later was acquired by the Seattle Seahawks, but did not see playing time as he was injured before the season. Before his NFL career, he played college football for the Mississippi State Bulldogs and was selected by the New York Jets in the fifth round of the 1987 NFL draft. On September 30, 2022, Jackson was inducted into the Mississippi State M-Club Hall of Fame.
