= Maben High School =

Coordinates: 33.5564°N 89.0881°W

Maben High School was a public secondary school located in Maben, Mississippi. Until 1970, it was a school for black children only; white children were bused 30 miles (48 km) to the white Sturgis High School. It was a part of the Oktibbeha County School District, and was later merged with Sturgis High School to form West Oktibbeha County High School

In 2015 the schools of Oktibbeha County district consolidated into the Starkville Oktibbeha Consolidated School District, and this school consolidated into Starkville High School. As of 2016, the site was abandoned.

In 1966, Maben won the Mississippi state high school baseball championship.

== Notable people ==
- Donald Lee, NFL football player
