= Hickory Grove, Mississippi =

- Unincorporated community
- Location within Mississippi Location within the United States
- Coordinates: 33°28′38″N 88°42′25″W
- Country: United States
- State: Mississippi
- County: Oktibbeha
- Elevation: 272 ft (83 m)
- Time zone: UTC-6 (Central (CST))
  - Summer (DST): UTC-5 (CDT)
- ZIP code: 39759
- Area code: 662
- GNIS feature ID: 682945

Hickory Grove is an unincorporated community in Oktibbeha County, Mississippi, United States.

In 1900, Hickory Grove had a population of 100.

A post office operated under the name Hickory Grove from 1840 to 1906.
