= Mississippi Highway 462 =

Highway in Mississippi

Mississippi Highway 462
- MS 462 highlighted in pink

Route information
- Maintained by MDOT
- Length: 4.623 mi (7.440 km)
- Existed: c. 1958–present

Major junctions
- West end: US 61 near Port Gibson
- East end: Willows Road / Old Port Gibson Road near Willows

Location
- Country: United States
- State: Mississippi
- Counties: Claiborne

Highway system
- Mississippi State Highway System; Interstate; US; State
← MS 454	→ MS 463

Mississippi Highway 462 (MS 462) is a state highway in western Mississippi. The route starts at U.S. Route 61 (US 61) near Port Gibson, and it travels eastward. The road then turns northeastward, and the route ends at Willows Road and Old Port Gibson Road near Willows. MS 462 was designated around 1958, as a gravel road extending eastward from US 61 near Port Gibson. The road was extended to MS 461 from 1960 to 1963, then to the Natchez Trace Parkway from 1967 to 1998.

== Route description ==
All of MS 462 is located in Claiborne County. In 2017, the Mississippi Department of Transportation (MDOT) calculated 470 vehicles traveling on MS 462 southwest of Vellie Morand Road on average each day. The route is legally defined in Mississippi Code § 65-3-3, and it is maintained by MDOT as part of the Mississippi State Highway System.

MS 462 starts at the intersection with US 61 and Grand Gulf Road north of Port Gibson, and it travels eastward. The road first travels along Pierre Bayou, and it soon turns northeastward into a forested area. The route crosses Lick Branch, and it intersects Vellie Morand Road. MS 462 then turns eastward near the unincorporated area of Willows, and state maintenance ends near Willows Road and Old Port Gibson Road. The road continues as Old Port Gibson Road, which continues to Raymond.

== History ==
Around 1958, a gravel road was constructed from US 61 near Port Gibson to a point 4.5 miles (7.2 km) away from the western terminus, and it was designated as MS 462. By 1960, the route was connected to MS 461 via a gravel county road that crossed Big Black River. The state-maintained section of MS 462 was also paved around this time. Three years later, MS 461 was decommissioned, and the eastern terminus of MS 462 was rerouted to a state-maintained gravel road near the then-proposed Natchez Trace Parkway. The route was completely paved by 1967, and it was connected to the parkway. In 1975, a project to add overlay to 4.621 miles (7.437 km) of MS 462 started. By 1998, only the section near US 61 was part of the state highway system.

== Major intersections ==
The entire route is in Claiborne County.

Location	mi	km	Destinations	Notes
	0.000	0.000	US 61 – Port Gibson, Vicksburg	Western terminus
Willows	4.623	7.440	Willows Road / Old Port Gibson Road	Eastern terminus; end state maintenance
1.000 mi = 1.609 km; 1.000 km = 0.621 mi
