= Starkville-Oktibbeha County Public Library System =

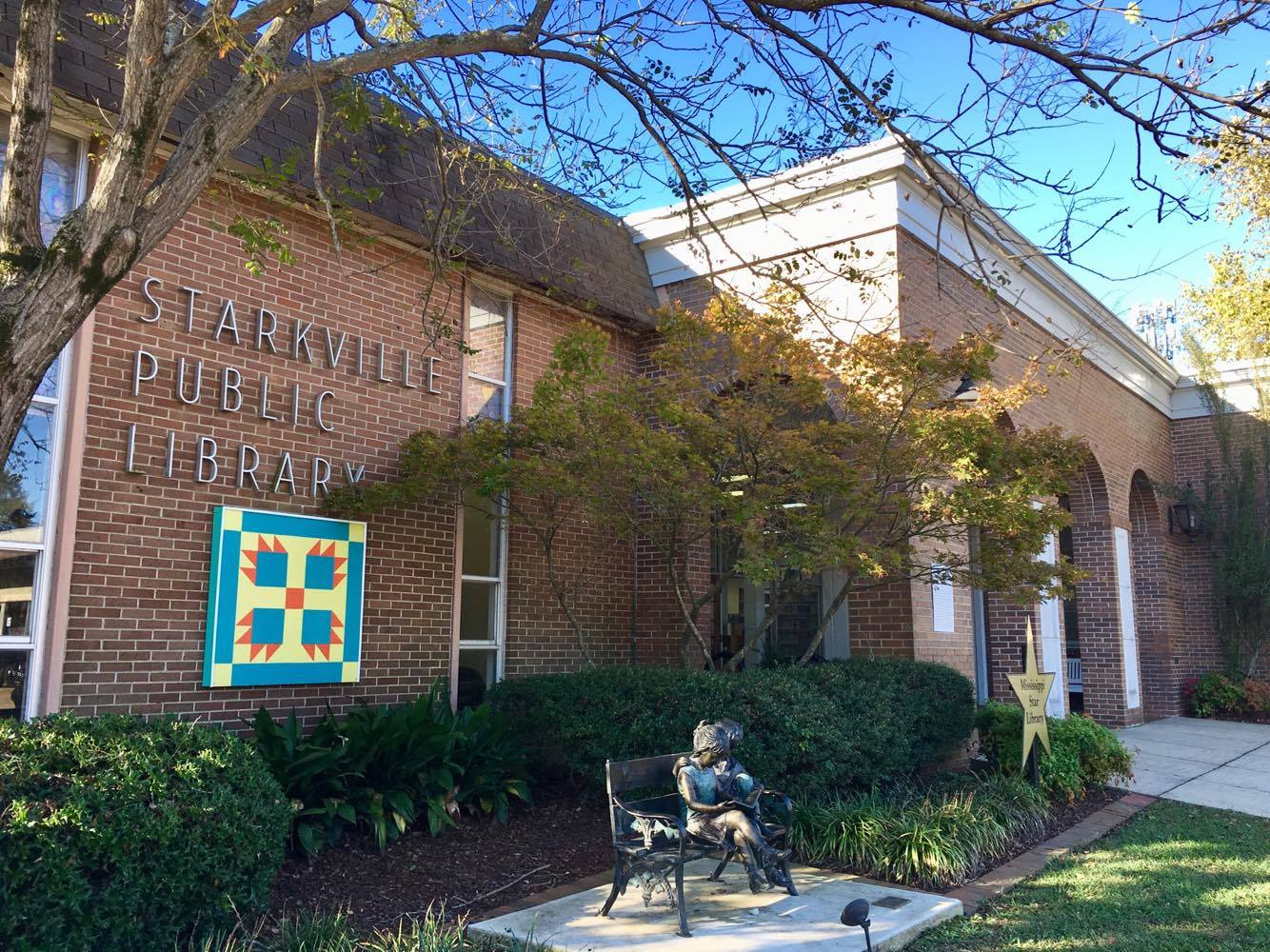
- The Starkville Public Library
- 33.463548°N 88.810609°W
- Location: Oktibbeha County, Mississippi
- Established: 1967
- Branches: 3

Collection
- Size: 80,852 (2015)

Access and use
- Circulation: 93,409 (2015)
- Population served: 49,800 (2015)
- Members: 13,951 (2015)

Other information
- Budget: $561,981 (2015)
- Director: Phillip Carter
- Employees: 15
- Website: starkville.lib.ms.us

The Starkville-Oktibbeha County Public Library System is a public library system serving Oktibbeha County, Mississippi. The library consists of three branches with the headquarters library, the Starkville Public Library, located in Starkville, Mississippi.

The library is part of the Mississippi Library Partnership, which is a consortium of public libraries in Mississippi that share their resources and catalog as a way to increase the number of books available for their residents. The system currently uses SirsiDynix as their cataloging software. The name of this consortium was previously the Golden Triangle Regional Library Consortium before it was renamed in 2012 to better represent the region.

== Branches ==
Name	Address
Maben Public Library	3982 2nd Avenue, Maben
Starkville Public Library	326 University Drive, Starkville
Sturgis Public Library	3865 Highway 12 West, Sturgis
