= Self Creek, Mississippi =

- Unincorporated community
- Location within Mississippi Location within the United States
- Coordinates: 33°27′55″N 89°00′40″W
- Country: United States
- State: Mississippi
- County: Oktibbeha
- Elevation: 318 ft (97 m)
- Time zone: UTC-6 (Central (CST))
  - Summer (DST): UTC-5 (CDT)
- ZIP code: 39759
- Area code: 662
- GNIS feature ID: 683011

Self Creek is an unincorporated community located in Oktibbeha County, Mississippi. Self Creek is approximately 11 miles (18 km) west of Starkville and approximately 8 miles (13 km) southeast of Mathiston.

In 1900, Self Creek had a population of 75.

A post office operated under the name Self Creek from 1892 to 1904.
