= Mississippi Highway 463 =

State Highway in Mississippi

Mississippi Highway 463

Route information
- Maintained by MDOT
- Length: 10.215 mi (16.439 km)
- Existed: 1956–present

Major junctions
- South end: US 51 in Madison
- I-55 in Madison
- North end: MS 22 near Flora

Location
- Country: United States
- State: Mississippi
- Counties: Madison

Highway system
- Mississippi State Highway System; Interstate; US; State
← MS 462	→ MS 465

Mississippi Highway 463 (MS 463) is a north–south state highway in Madison County, Mississippi, connecting U.S. Route 51 (US 51) in Madison to MS 22 east of Flora. It intersects Interstate 55 (I-55) at the state's only single-point urban interchange.

== Route description ==
MS 463 starts at the intersection of US 51 and Hoy Road in Madison, and travels westward from the center of the town. The road, known as Madison Parkway, crosses over a railroad and intersects Main Street. The route then travels northwestwards on Main Street and intersects I-55 at a Single-point urban interchange. The highway has a major a major intersection with Highland Colony Parkway and Bozeman Road. After this, MS 463 takes the name of New Mannsdale Road, and later Mannsdale Road at its intersection with Henderson Road. MS 463 begins to turn north at North Livingston Road, and then it travels through a large residential area. The road leaves the city limits of Madison north of Annadale Road and turns northwest near Stribling Road. The route ends at a T-intersection with Mississippi Highway 22 near Flora.

== Major intersections ==
The entire route is in Madison County.

Location	mi	km	Destinations	Notes
Madison	0.0	0.0	US 51 – Jackson, Ridgeland, Gluckstadt, Canton	Southern terminus
Madison	1.6	2.6	I-55 – Grenada, Jackson	I-55 exit 108; SPUI interchange
	10.1	16.3	MS 22 – Flora, Canton	Northern terminus
1.000 mi = 1.609 km; 1.000 km = 0.621 mi
