= Sturgis High School (Mississippi) =

School in Mississippi, United States

Coordinates: 33.5564°N 89.0881°W

Sturgis High School was a public secondary school located in Sturgis, Mississippi. Until 1970, it was a school for white children only; black children were bused 30 miles (48 km) to the black Maben High School. It was a part of the Oktibbeha County School District, and was later merged with Maben High School to form West Oktibbeha County High School.

In 2015 the schools of Oktibbeha County district consolidated into the Starkville Oktibbeha Consolidated School District, and West Oktibbeha consolidated into Starkville High School.

== Notable people ==
- Kirby Jackson, NFL football player went to Sturgis High School.
