= National Register of Historic Places listings in Leake County, Mississippi =

Location of Leake County in Mississippi

This is a list of the National Register of Historic Places listings in Leake County, Mississippi.

This is intended to be a complete list of the properties and districts on the National Register of Historic Places in Leake County, Mississippi, United States. Latitude and longitude coordinates are provided for many National Register properties and districts; these locations may be seen together in a map.

There are 5 properties and districts listed on the National Register in the county.

This National Park Service list is complete through NPS recent listings posted October 23, 2026.

== Current listings ==
	Name on the Register	Image	Date listed	Location	City or town	Description
1	Carthage Historic District		July 25, 2012 (#12000432)	Roughly bounded by E. & W. Water, Mill, N. & S. Jordan, N. Pearl, & N. & S. White Sts. 32°44′12″N 89°32′00″W	Carthage	
2	Jordan House		November 30, 1982 (#82000576)	E. Franklin St. 32°44′16″N 89°31′50″W	Carthage	
3	Robinson Road (190-191-3M)	Robinson Road (190-191-3M)	November 7, 1976 (#76000158)	Southwest of Kosciusko; 32°42′37″N 89°42′31″W	Kosciusko	
4	Steep Mound Site (22LK26)	Steep Mound Site (22LK26)	January 14, 1987 (#86003634)	Address restricted	Carthage	
5	U.S. Post Office	U.S. Post Office	April 21, 1983 (#83000956)	201 N. Pearl St. 32°44′15″N 89°32′04″W	Carthage	

== See also ==
- List of National Historic Landmarks in Mississippi
- National Register of Historic Places listings in Mississippi
