= Donald Lee (American football) =

American football player (born 1980)

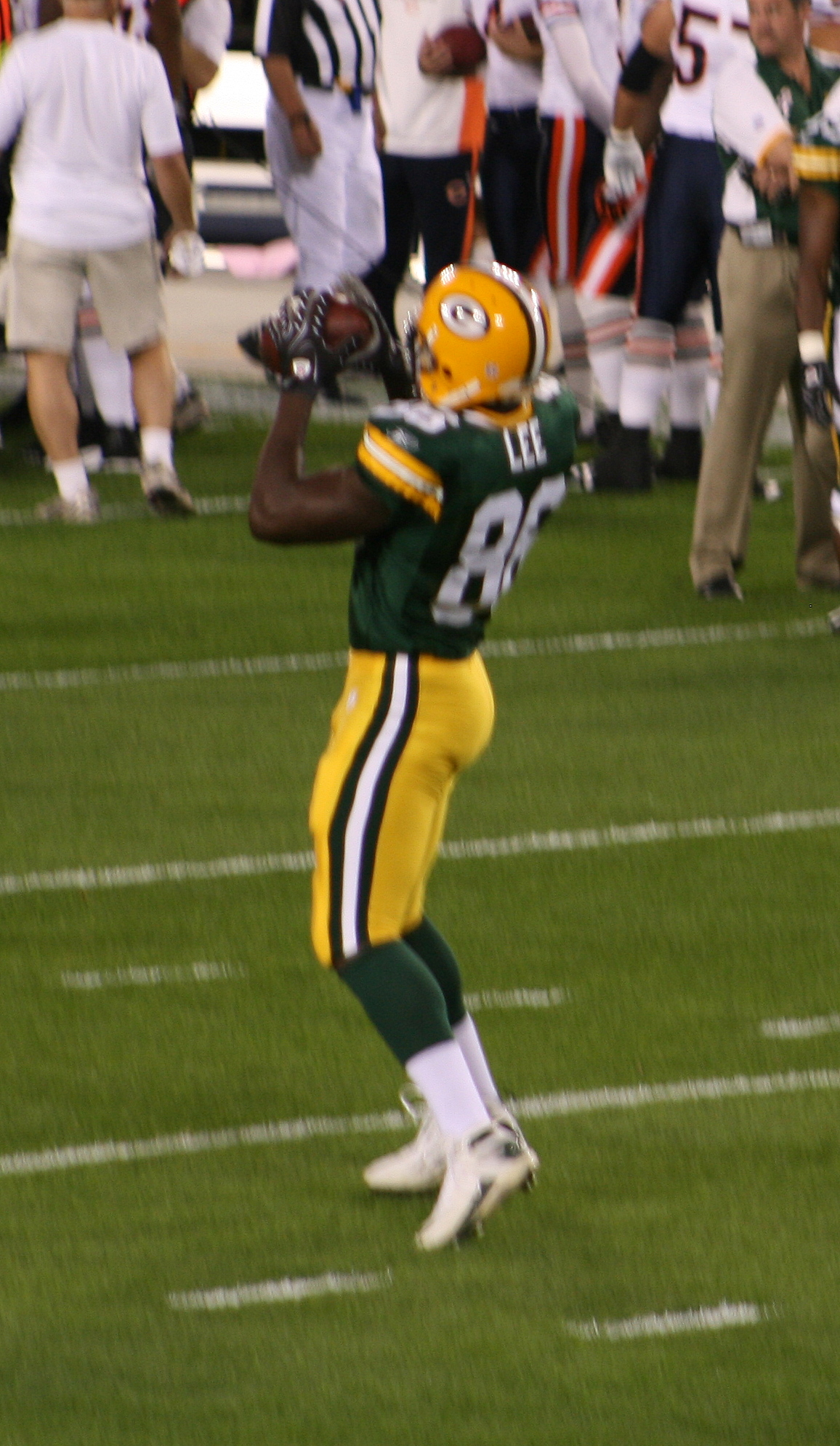
- Lee with the Packers in 2007

No. 85, 86
- Position: Tight end

Personal information
- Born: August 31, 1980 (age 46); Maben, Mississippi, U.S.
- Listed height: 6 ft 4 in (1.93 m)
- Listed weight: 248 lb (112 kg)

Career information
- High school: Maben
- College: Mississippi State (1999–2002)
- NFL draft: 2003: 5th round, 156th overall pick

Career history
- Miami Dolphins (2003–2004); Green Bay Packers (2005–2010); Philadelphia Eagles (2011)*; Cincinnati Bengals (2011–2012)
- * Offseason or practice squad member only

Awards and highlights
- Super Bowl champion (XLV)

Career NFL statistics
- Receptions: 209
- Receiving yards: 1,990
- Receiving touchdowns: 19
- Stats at Pro Football Reference

Donald Tywon Lee (born August 31, 1980) is an American former professional football player who was a tight end in the National Football League (NFL). He played college football for the Mississippi State Bulldogs. He was selected by the Miami Dolphins in the fifth round of the 2003 NFL draft and spent two seasons with the team. He also played for the Green Bay Packers from 2005 to 2010 and the Cincinnati Bengals from 2011 to 2012. With Green Bay, he won Super Bowl XLV against the Pittsburgh Steelers.

== Early life ==
Lee attended Maben High School in Mississippi, where he lettered in football, track, and basketball.

== College career ==
Before his professional career, Lee was a four-year letterman at Mississippi State from 1999 to 2002.

== Professional career ==
Pre-draft measurables
Height	Weight	Arm length	Hand span	40-yard dash	10-yard split	20-yard split	20-yard shuttle	Three-cone drill	Vertical jump	Broad jump	Bench press
6 ft 3 in (1.91 m)	249 lb (113 kg)	32 1/2 in (0.83 m)	9 1/2 in (0.24 m)	4.82 s	1.67 s	2.81 s	4.42 s	7.42 s	39 in (0.99 m)	10 ft 0 in (3.05 m)	26 reps
All values from NFL Combine.

=== Miami Dolphins ===
Lee was selected by the Miami Dolphins in the fifth round, 156th overall in the 2003 NFL draft. He went on to play two years for the Dolphins.

=== Green Bay Packers ===
In the 2005 NFL season, Lee was signed by the Green Bay Packers in free agency.

After the injury of Bubba Franks, Lee gained more playing time. He finished the season fourth in receiving (1st among tight ends) for the Packers.

In November 2007, Lee signed a four-year contract extension with the Packers for $12 million. On November 18, 2007, Lee had the first multi-touchdown game of his career as he caught two touchdown passes from Brett Favre in a 31–17 victory over the Carolina Panthers. Lee also found the end zone in Favre's record setting day for "most passing yards" on December 16, 2007, vs. the St. Louis Rams. Lee finished the 2007 season with 48 receptions for 575 yards and six touchdowns. He also caught Favre's final touchdown pass as a Packer during the NFC Championship Game against the New York Giants on January 20, 2008.

His final career touchdown and his final reception as a Packer was a game-winning fourth-quarter touchdown in a must-win Week 17 victory over the Chicago Bears, in which the Packers won 10–3. Had the Packers tied or lost that game, they would have missed the playoffs. Lee appeared in all four playoff games thereafter on the way to Green Bay's fourth-ever Super Bowl victory.

On March 2, 2011, Lee was released by the Packers.

=== Philadelphia Eagles ===
On July 29, 2011, Lee was signed to a one-year contract with the Philadelphia Eagles. He was released during final roster cuts on September 3.

=== Cincinnati Bengals ===
Lee was signed by the Cincinnati Bengals on September 14, 2011. Lee was released by the Bengals on September 27, 2012.

=== Regular season statistics ===
Year	Receiving
Year	Team	G	Rec	Yds	TD	Avg
2003	MIA	16	7	110	1	15.7
2004	MIA	16	13	110	1	8.5
2005	GB	15	33	294	2	8.9
2006	GB	15	10	150	0	15.0
2007	GB	15	48	575	6	12.0
2008	GB	16	39	303	5	7.8
2009	GB	16	37	260	1	7.0
2010	GB	15	11	73	3	6.6
2011	CIN	9	11	115	0	10.5
Total		109	187	1802	16	9.6

=== Post-season statistics ===
Year	Receiving
Year	Team	G	Rec	Yds	TD	Avg
2007	GB	2	5	51	1	10.2
2009	GB	1	0	0	0	0
2010	GB	4	0	0	0	0
2011	CIN	1	1	36	0	36.0
Total		7	6	87	1	10.9

== Personal life ==
Lee was dating former WNBA player Anriel Howard better known as current WWE NXT Superstar Lash Legend. He also has three children, Donsha, Don Lee Jr, and Orsen Lee.
