= Mississippi Highway 403 =

Highway in Mississippi

Mississippi Highway 403
- MS 403 highlighted in pink

Route information
- Maintained by MDOT
- Length: 3.303 mi (5.316 km)
- Existed: c. 1960–present

Major junctions
- South end: US 82 / MS 15 in Mathiston
- North end: Old US 82 / Clarkson Road near Mathiston

Location
- Country: United States
- State: Mississippi
- Counties: Webster

Highway system
- Mississippi State Highway System; Interstate; US; State
← MS 397	→ MS 404

Mississippi Highway 403 (MS 403) is a state highway in central Mississippi. The route starts at U.S. Route 82 (US 82) and MS 15 in Mathiston, and it travels north away from the town. It then turns east near Natchez Trace Parkway and then travels below it. MS 403 ends at the intersection of Clarkson Road and Old US 82 near a county highway maintenance barn. The route was designated by 1960, after a paved road extending from Mathiston was constructed around 1958. An extension northwards to MS 50 and MS 341 existed from 1960 to 1967.

== Route description ==
Traffic volume on Mississippi Highway 403
Location	Volume
South of Sutphin Street	2,000
North of East Weber Drive	1,500
East of Clarkson Road	630
Data was measured in 2017 in terms of AADT; Source: Mississippi Department of Transportation

All of MS 403 is located in Webster County. The route is legally defined in Mississippi Code § 65-3-3, and it is maintained by Mississippi Department of Transportation (MDOT) as part of the Mississippi State Highway System.

MS 403 starts at an all-way stop intersection with US 82 and MS 15 in Mathiston, and it travels north as a continuation of Horton Street from MS 15. The route travels through a forested area within the town and intersects East Weber Drive south of the city limits. The road then intersects McComb and Shine Jewel roads north of the city limits and continues north to Old US 82 and Stallings Road, which leads to the Natchez Trace Parkway. MS 403 turns east at the intersection, traveling along Old US 82 and through an underpass at the parkway. The road crosses over Big Black River and meets Clarkson Road. State maintenance ends near a county highway maintenance barn, and the road continues as Old US 82.

== History ==
Around 1958, a paved road was constructed from Mathiston to a point 1.3 miles (2.1 km) north of the town. By 1960, the road was then designated as MS 403, and it was extended northwards to the intersection of MS 50 and MS 341. MS 403 was then truncated to a point near the Natchez Trace Parkway by 1967.

== Major intersections ==
The entire route is in Webster County.

Location	mi	km	Destinations	Notes
Mathiston	0.000	0.000	US 82 / MS 15 – Ackerman, Starkville, Europa	Southern terminus
	3.303	5.316	Old US 82	Northern terminus
1.000 mi = 1.609 km; 1.000 km = 0.621 mi
