= Morgantown, Oktibbeha County, Mississippi =

Town in Mississippi, United States

Morgantown, Mississippi
- Unincorporated community
- Morgantown
- Location within Mississippi Location within the United States
- Coordinates: 33°18′20″N 88°59′49″W
- Country: United States
- State: Mississippi
- County: Oktibbeha
- Elevation: 308 ft (94 m)
- Time zone: UTC-6 (Central (CST))
  - Summer (DST): UTC-5 (CDT)
- ZIP code: 39769
- Area code: 662
- GNIS feature ID: 694037

Morgantown, Mississippi is a small unincorporated community in Oktibbeha County, Mississippi, located between the Noxubee River and Sand Creek at latitude 33.306 and longitude -88.997.

== History ==
Morgantown was founded near the end of the American Civil War by George Decatur Morgan, who first arrived in the area, pre-war, via wagon train, driven by a family named "Outlaw." Morgan worked as a hired hand for the Outlaws, primarily tending to their slaves. Following his service in the war, Morgan returned to the area, and settled on a small parcel of land approximately one mile south of the town's present location. He resumed his work for the Outlaw family as a farm-hand. In the 1860s, Morgan, along with other early settlers (Daniel McHann, Miland Scott, and George Johns) acquired larger tracts of land in the area, and formed a farming cooperative. Many hired hands settled in the area to work the crops. A sawmill, cotton gin, and school house (which also served as the church house) were established. Morgan had many children and other descendants who, over time, purchased land from the original settlers, particularly from the McHann estate. As the folklore goes, the wife of one of Morgan's descendants suggested the name of the town due to the abundance of Morgans who lived there.

== Demographics ==
Morgantown has a population of 1,412 as of 2010. Morgantown lost almost 20% of its population between 2006 and 2010. The population is 37% white and 59% black. The median age is 39.4 years. Over 42% have attended college.
