= West Oktibbeha County High School =

School in Maben, Mississippi, United States

Coordinates: 33.5564°N 89.0881°W

West Oktibbeha County High School (WOCHS) was a public secondary school located in Maben, Mississippi. It was a part of the Oktibbeha County School District, formed by the consolidation of two high schools that had originally been segregated: formerly all-white Sturgis High School and the once all-black Maben High School.

In 2015 the schools of Oktibbeha County district consolidated into the Starkville Oktibbeha Consolidated School District, and this school consolidated into Starkville High School.

As of 2016 the site was abandoned.
