= Columbus-Lowndes County Airport =

Airport in Mississippi, United States

- IATA: UBS; ICAO: KUBS; FAA LID: UBS

Summary
- Airport type: Public
- Owner: City of Columbus & Lowndes County
- Serves: Columbus, Mississippi
- Elevation AMSL: 188 ft (57 m)
- Coordinates: 33°27′55″N 088°22′49″W

Map
- Location of airport in Mississippi UBS (the United States)

Runways
Direction	Length		Surface
Direction	ft	m	Surface
18/36	4,500	1,372	Asphalt

Statistics (2012)
- Aircraft operations: 13,200
- Based aircraft: 24
- Source: Federal Aviation Administration

Columbus-Lowndes County Airport (IATA: UBS, ICAO: KUBS, FAA LID: UBS) is a public use airport located three nautical miles (6 km) southeast of the central business district of Columbus, a city in Lowndes County, Mississippi, United States. It is owned by the City of Columbus and Lowndes County.

== Facilities and aircraft ==
Columbus-Lowndes County Airport covers an area of 215 acres (87 ha) at an elevation of 188 feet (57 m) above mean sea level. It has one runway designated 18/36 with an asphalt surface measuring 4,500 by 100 feet (1,372 x 30 m).

For the 12-month period ending January 18, 2012, the airport had 13,200 aircraft operations, an average of 36 per day: 96% general aviation, 2% air taxi, and 2% military. At that time there were 24 aircraft based at this airport: 71% single-engine, 12.5% multi-engine, 12.5% ultralight, and 4% glider.

== See also ==
- List of airports in Mississippi
