= Kid Thomas (musician) =

- Also known as: Tommy Louis, Tommy Lewis
- Born: Louis Thomas Watts; June 20, 1934; Sturgis, Mississippi, United States
- Died: April 5, 1970 (aged 35) Los Angeles, California, United States
- Genres: Blues, R&B, rock, rock and roll
- Instruments: Vocals, harmonica
- Years active: 1950–1969
- Labels: Federal, Transcontinental, Muriel

Louis Thomas Watts, commonly known as Kid Thomas (20 June 1934 – 5 April 1970) was an American musician, who created music in the rock, rock & roll and blues genres.

== Life and career ==
Kid Thomas was born in Sturgis, Mississippi, United States. As a child he moved to Chicago, Illinois, and learned the harmonica. While he later switched to rock and roll, he initially played blues. By the early 1950s, he played regularly with Muddy Waters, Elmore James and Bo Diddley, and as a solo performer. In 1955 he recorded his first single, "Wolf Pack", for Federal Records. However, it was not successful, and other recordings he made for Federal went unissued for many years.

After a stint performing in clubs in Wichita, Kansas, where he joined up with Hound Dog Taylor, he travelled to Los Angeles with the idea of emulating the success of Little Richard. There, he met record producer George Motola, and in 1959 recorded the single "Rockin' This Joint To-Nite," which was released on Motola's Transcontinental Records label. The record has been described as "one of the wildest rock'n'roll discs of all time with Kid Thomas blowing his harmonica and shouting out the lyrics in a frantic frenzy." However, it was not a commercial success. He continued to perform with a band in Los Angeles clubs, often as Tommy Louis and the Rythm (sic) Rockers or Tommy Louis and the Versatiles. In 1965, he recorded two singles for the Muriel Records label, "The Hurt Is On" and "Wail Baby Wail", another full-blooded rocker featuring guitar by Marshall Hooks, but neither were hits. His final record, as Tommy Lewis, was "(You Are An) Angel", on the Cenco Records label in 1969.

Finding little commercial success, Kid Thomas worked as a lawn mowing man in Los Angeles in the latter half of the 1960s. On September 3, 1969, while driving his truck he struck a young boy and killed him. Arrested on a charge of manslaughter, the charge was later dismissed for lack of evidence. However, the boy's father waited outside the courthouse and shot him. Kid Thomas died at UCLA Medical Center, Beverly Hills on April 5, 1970.
