= Robinson Road (Mississippi) =

Historical road in Mississippi

Coordinates: 33.232820°N 88.912378°W

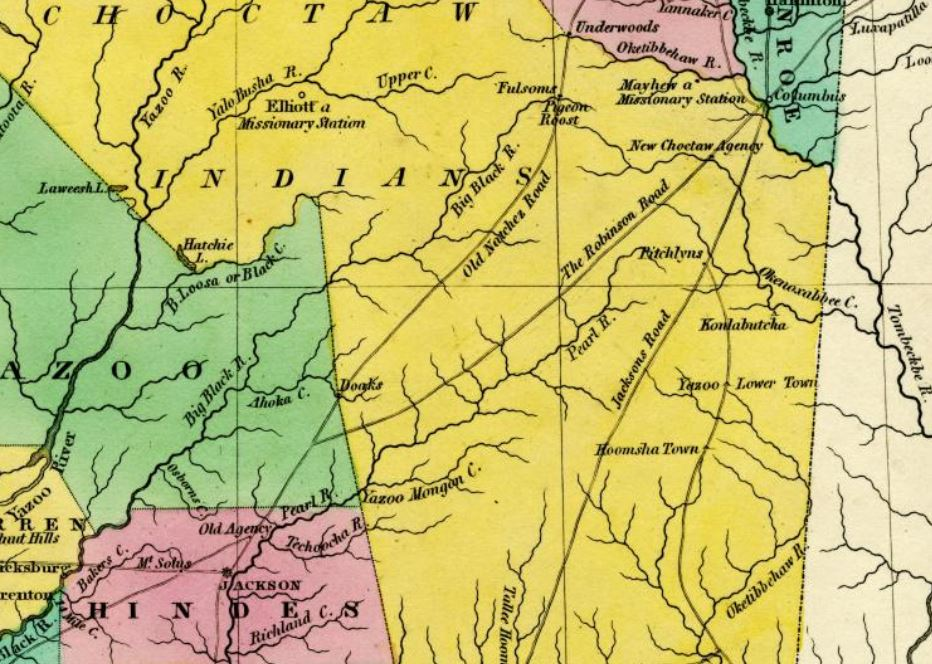
1831 map showing the Robinson Road (located in center of map)

The Robinson Road is a historical road in the US state of Mississippi. It ran from Columbus to the Natchez Trace via Agency, Louisville, and Carthage. From the Natchez Trace intersection, the road continued to Canton; and the road's southwestern terminus was near Ridgeland, ten miles north of Jackson.

The Robinson Road was designated as a mail route in 1822, which diverted northern Mississippi traffic from the Natchez Trace. The United States government appropriated funds to improve Robinson Road in 1823, as did the Mississippi Legislature in 1824, as the road served as the only contemporary route that connected Jackson to settlements along the Tombigbee River. According to a history of Methodism in Mississippi, "Mr. Raymond Robinson, of Hinds County, who built the first house in the town of Raymond and gave it his Christian name, was employed to survey and make the road, which took his name. It left the old Natchez and Nashville Trace in the northeastern corner of Madison County and passed diagonally across what is now Leake, Winston, and Oktibbeha Counties, until it intersected, near Columbus, the military road leading from Florence, on the Tennessee River, to New Orleans. The Robinson Road soon became one of the most important roads in Mississippi, not only as a connecting link between those remote counties and the body of the State, but as a convenience to travelers in general, and especially to emigrants moving from the east to the New Purchase." One of the daughters of the mixed-race LeFlore family "married a white man by the name of Wilson, who kept a good eating and lodging house on the Robison Road."

The road appeared on a map of Mississippi from 1831 that illustrated the Robinson Road extending from Columbus to the Natchez Trace near Wiggins in Leake County.

Portions of the road are on the National Register of Historic Places in Winston and Leake counties. A historical marker that gives a description of the road is located on the Natchez Trace at mile marker 135.

== Gallery ==
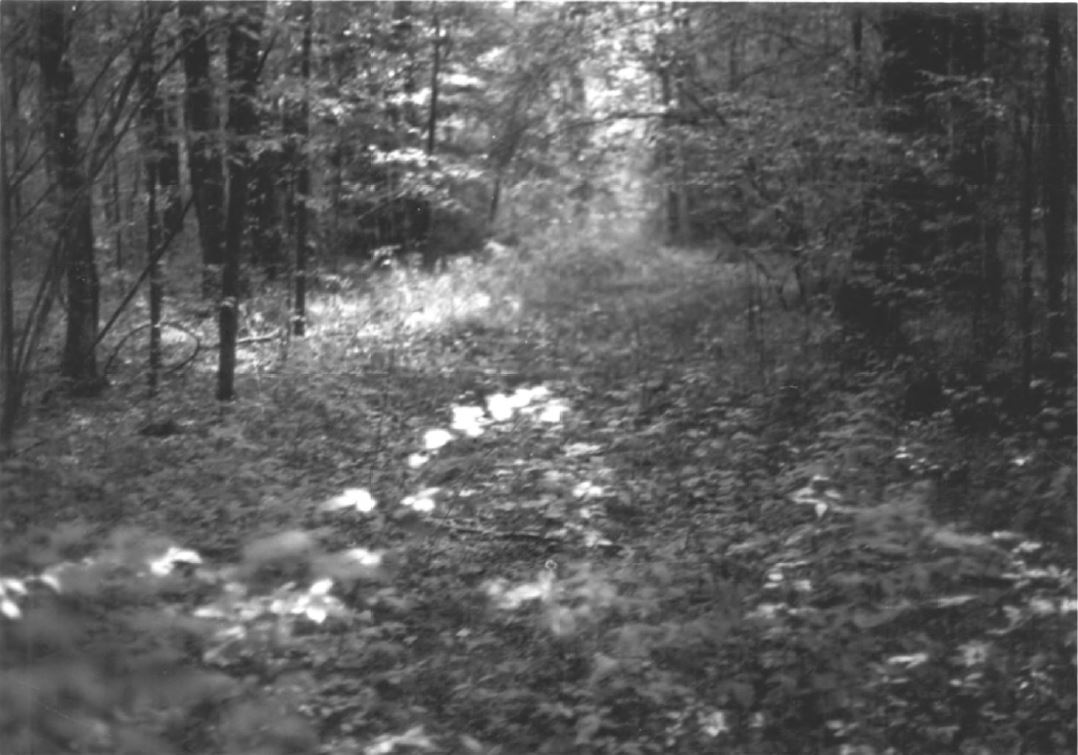
Robinson Road in 1974.

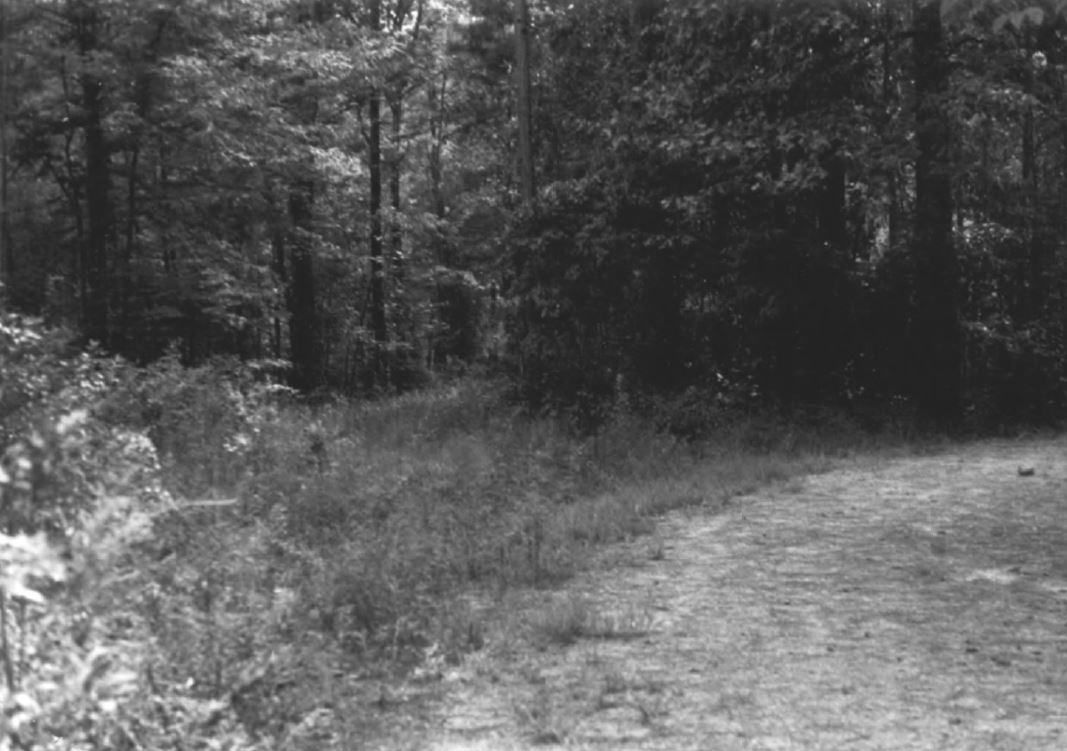
View of Robinson Road in 1974. Robinson Road is in left of photograph intersecting with modern logging road.
