= Adaton, Mississippi =

- Unincorporated community
- Adaton
- Location within Mississippi Location within the United States
- Coordinates: 33°28′38″N 88°55′17″W
- Country: United States
- State: Mississippi
- County: Oktibbeha
- Elevation: 266 ft (81 m)
- Time zone: UTC-6 (Central (CST))
  - Summer (DST): UTC-5 (CDT)
- ZIP code: 39769
- Area code: 662
- GNIS feature ID: 666157

Adaton is an unincorporated community originally known as Steele's Mill and later as Aderton. Steele's mill was founded around 1852. The town is located about four miles west of Starkville at the intersection of Mississippi Highway 182 and Self Creek Road, immediately south of Oktibbeha County Lake in Oktibbeha County, Mississippi, United States.

== History ==
James Robert Steele built a lumber mill and cotton gin in what is now Adaton around 1852, after relocating from Steelville farther west in Oktibbeha County. John Easterwood built a new gin on Self Creek Road in 1893, behind Christopher's Store, which operated from some time in the late 1800s until 1979. In 1870, the first Adaton post office was established. The town began as a farming community and became known for its many churches, some of which still exist today. Adaton United Methodist Church was founded in 1878, after originally organizing in 1856 as Steele's Chapel, Josey Creek Missionary Baptist Church was founded by poor black sharecroppers in 1886 in a brush arbor, and Adaton Baptist Church was founded in 1923. The local economy progressed over the years from cotton farming to dairy, then lumber. Today the community is primarily a bedroom community to the city of Starkville and Mississippi State University.
