= Osborn, Mississippi =

- Unincorporated community
- Location within Mississippi Location within the United States
- Coordinates: 33°31′17″N 88°43′20″W
- Country: United States
- State: Mississippi
- County: Oktibbeha
- Elevation: 262 ft (80 m)
- Time zone: UTC-6 (Central (CST))
  - Summer (DST): UTC-5 (CDT)
- ZIP code: 39759
- Area code: 662
- GNIS feature ID: 675314

Osborn is an unincorporated community located in Oktibbeha County, Mississippi. Osborn is approximately 9 miles (14 km) northeast of Starkville and approximately 7 miles (11 km) west of Tibbee.

== History ==
Osborn is located on the CPKC Railway. In 1900, Osborn had a population of 100.

A post office operated under the name Osborn from 1884 to 1949.

In 1960, seven black men from Little Rock used a restroom at Weaver's Amoco in Osborn, where there was only one restroom, which was for whites only. They were arrested at Mayhew Junction in Lowndes county, and required to pay a $200 per person bond. According to the law, they each faced a maximum penalty of six months in jail and a fine of $500. The case was widely anticipated as the first test of the state's sit-in law, but was settled when the defendants unexpectedly pleaded guilty and paid a small fine in Starkville the next day.

== Notable people ==
- Tony Hollins, blues singer
- Toby Turner, comedian
