= Muldrow, Mississippi =

- Unincorporated community
- Location within Mississippi Location within the United States
- Coordinates: 33°32′48″N 88°42′16″W
- Country: United States
- State: Mississippi
- County: Oktibbeha
- Elevation: 226 ft (69 m)
- Time zone: UTC-6 (Central (CST))
  - Summer (DST): UTC-5 (CDT)
- Area code: 662
- GNIS feature ID: 674462

Muldrow is an unincorporated community in Oktibbeha County, Mississippi, United States, located northeast of Starkville and southwest of West Point.

== History ==
A variant name is "Muldrow Station". A station on the Illinois Central Railroad once operated here. The population in 1900 was 41.

A post office operated under the name Muldrow from 1906 to 1918.
