= Clayton Village, Mississippi =

- Unincorporated community
- Location within Mississippi Location within the United States
- Coordinates: 33°28′26″N 88°45′21″W
- Country: United States
- State: Mississippi
- County: Oktibbeha
- Elevation: 262 ft (80 m)
- Time zone: UTC-6 (Central (CST))
  - Summer (DST): UTC-5 (CDT)
- ZIP code: 39759
- Area code: 662
- GNIS feature ID: 668541

Clayton Village is an unincorporated community located near U.S. Route 82 in Oktibbeha County, Mississippi, near Starkville and approximately 4 miles (6.4 km) south-southwest of Osborn.

The community is currently unincorporated but is home to multiple businesses and a 200-home subdivision.
