= Muldrow (surname) =

Muldrow is a surname. Notable people with the surname include:

- Georgia Anne Muldrow (born 1983), American musician
- Henry L. Muldrow (1837–1905), American politician
- Michelle Muldrow (born 1968), American painter
- Robert Muldrow (1864–1950), American geologist
- Ronald Muldrow (1949–2007), American guitarist
- Sam Muldrow (born 1988), American basketball player
- W. Stephen Muldrow (born 1964), American lawyer
