= Maben, Mississippi =

- Town
- Location of Maben, Mississippi

- Location in the United States
- Coordinates: 33°33′24″N 89°5′1″W
- Country: United States
- State: Mississippi
- Counties: Oktibbeha, Webster

Area
  - Total: 1.95 sq mi (5.05 km^{2})
  - Land: 1.94 sq mi (5.03 km^{2})
  - Water: 0.0077 sq mi (0.02 km^{2})
- Elevation: 449 ft (137 m)

Population (2020)
  - Total: 771
  - Density: 397.3/sq mi (153.39/km^{2})
- Time zone: UTC-6 (Central (CST))
  - Summer (DST): UTC-5 (CDT)
- ZIP code: 39750
- Area code: 662
- FIPS code: 28-42980
- GNIS feature ID: 0672979
- Website: www.maben.ms.gov

Maben is a town in Oktibbeha and Webster counties, Mississippi. As of the 2020 census, Maben had a population of 771.

== History ==
Pioneer aviator Charles Lindbergh spent two weeks in Maben making repairs to his Jenny airplane and taking locals up for rides at five dollars each during May 1923.

== Geography ==
Maben is located at 33°33′24″N 89°05′01″W (33.556772, -89.083647). Most of the town is in Oktibbeha County, with a portion on the west side in adjacent Webster County In the 2000 census, 542 of the town's 803 residents (67.5%) lived in Oktibbeha County and 261 (32.5%) in Webster County.

According to the United States Census Bureau, the town has a total area of 2.0 square miles (5.1 km^{2}), all land.

== Demographics ==
Historical population
| Census | Pop. | Note | %± |
|---|---|---|---|
| 1900 | 282 | | — |
| 1910 | 539 | | 91.1% |
| 1920 | 499 | | −7.4% |
| 1930 | 508 | | 1.8% |
| 1940 | 675 | | 32.9% |
| 1950 | 616 | | −8.7% |
| 1960 | 696 | | 13.0% |
| 1970 | 862 | | 23.9% |
| 1980 | 855 | | −0.8% |
| 1990 | 752 | | −12.0% |
| 2000 | 803 | | 6.8% |
| 2010 | 871 | | 8.5% |
| 2020 | 771 | | −11.5% |
U.S. Decennial Census

=== Racial and ethnic composition ===
Maben town, Mississippi – Racial and ethnic composition Note: the US Census treats Hispanic/Latino as an ethnic category. This table excludes Latinos from the racial categories and assigns them to a separate category. Hispanics/Latinos may be of any race.
| Race / Ethnicity (NH = Non-Hispanic) | Pop 2000 | Pop 2010 | Pop 2020 | % 2000 | % 2010 | % 2020 |
|---|---|---|---|---|---|---|
| White alone (NH) | 331 | 322 | 232 | 41.22% | 36.97% | 30.09% |
| Black or African American alone (NH) | 465 | 526 | 496 | 57.91% | 60.39% | 64.33% |
| Native American or Alaska Native alone (NH) | 1 | 5 | 1 | 0.12% | 0.57% | 0.13% |
| Asian alone (NH) | 2 | 1 | 2 | 0.25% | 0.11% | 0.26% |
| Native Hawaiian or Pacific Islander alone (NH) | 0 | 0 | 0 | 0.00% | 0.00% | 0.00% |
| Other race alone (NH) | 0 | 0 | 0 | 0.00% | 0.00% | 0.00% |
| Mixed race or Multiracial (NH) | 2 | 7 | 20 | 0.25% | 0.80% | 2.59% |
| Hispanic or Latino (any race) | 2 | 10 | 20 | 0.25% | 1.15% | 2.59% |
| Total | 803 | 871 | 771 | 100.00% | 100.00% | 100.00% |

=== 2020 census ===
As of the 2020 United States census, there were 771 people, 258 households, and 149 families residing in the town.

=== 2000 census ===
As of the census of 2000, there were 803 people, 306 households, and 211 families residing in the town. The population density was 412.4 inhabitants per square mile (159.2/km^{2}). There were 328 housing units at an average density of 168.4 per square mile (65.0/km^{2}). The racial makeup of the town was 41.22% White, 57.91% African American, 0.12% Native American, 0.25% Asian, 0.25% from other races, and 0.25% from two or more races. Hispanic or Latino of any race were 0.25% of the population.

There were 306 households, out of which 35.6% had children under the age of 18 living with them, 30.4% were married couples living together, 35.3% had a female householder with no husband present, and 31.0% were non-families. 26.8% of all households were made up of individuals, and 11.8% had someone living alone who was 65 years of age or older. The average household size was 2.59 and the average family size was 3.16.

In the town, the population was spread out, with 33.6% under the age of 18, 8.8% from 18 to 24, 26.3% from 25 to 44, 18.9% from 45 to 64, and 12.3% who were 65 years of age or older. The median age was 32 years. For every 100 females, there were 70.1 males. For every 100 females age 18 and over, there were 63.0 males.

The median income for a household in the town was $19,632, and the median income for a family was $18,000. Males had a median income of $22,125 versus $16,375 for females. The per capita income for the town was $10,823. About 40.3% of families and 42.0% of the population were below the poverty line, including 54.9% of those under age 18 and 25.0% of those age 65 or over.

== Education ==
Most of Maben is served by the Starkville Oktibbeha Consolidated School District, although the small portion of the town that is located in Webster County is served by the Webster County School District. All Oktibbeha County residents are zoned to Armstrong Middle School and Starkville High School in Starkville.

The community was previously served by Oktibbeha County Schools, which had been taken over by the state on two occasions. In 2013 the state legislature passed a law forcing Starkville City School district to take over Oktibbeha County Schools. In 2015 the West Oktibbeha County High School in Maben consolidated into Starkville High.

Maben is served by the Starkville-Oktibbeha County Public Library System which operates the Maben Public Library.

East Mississippi Community College is the community college of Oktibbeha County.

== Notable people ==
- Johnthan Banks, who played 5 years as an NFL defensive back with the Tampa Bay Buccaneers and other teams.
- Donald Lee, NFL player for the Green Bay Packers, was born in Maben and attended West Oktibbeha High School in Maben.
- Amy Tuck, Lieutenant Governor of Mississippi 2000–2008.
