= Oktibbeha County, Mississippi =

County in Mississippi, United States

- County
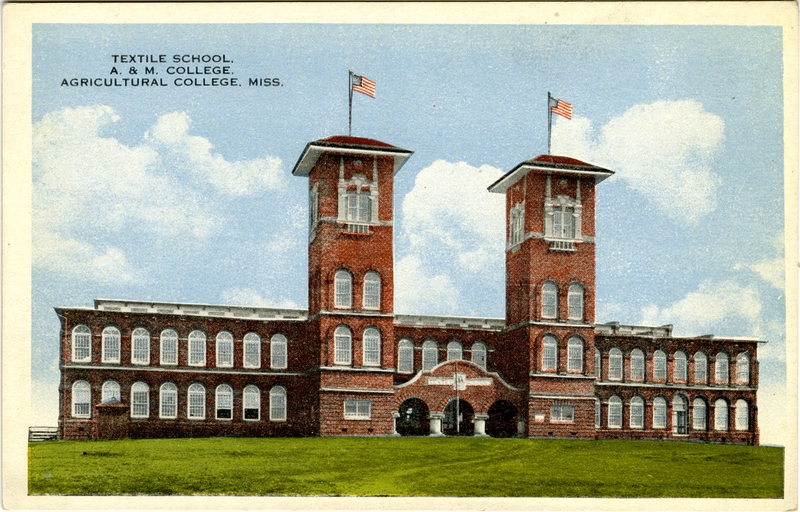
- Postcard. Textile Building of Mississippi State University, Starkville

- Location within the U.S. state of Mississippi
- Coordinates: 33°26′N 88°53′W
- Country: United States
- State: Mississippi
- Founded: 1833
- Named for: Often translated "icy creek", Oktibbeha is from Choctaw okti abeha bok meaning "ice, there in the creek".
- Seat: Starkville
- Largest city: Starkville

Area
  - Total: 462 sq mi (1,200 km^{2})
  - Land: 458 sq mi (1,190 km^{2})
  - Water: 3.7 sq mi (9.6 km^{2}) 0.8%

Population (2020)
  - Total: 51,788
  - Estimate (2025): 51,896 ▲
  - Density: 113/sq mi (43.7/km^{2})
- Time zone: UTC−6 (Central)
  - Summer (DST): UTC−5 (CDT)
- Congressional districts: 1st, 3rd
- Website: www.oktibbeha.ms.gov

Oktibbeha County (/ɑːk.ˈtɪbəˌhɑː/ ahk-TIB-ə-HAH) is a county in the east central portion of the U.S. state of Mississippi. As of the 2020 census the population was 51,788. The county seat is Starkville. The county's name is derived from a Choctaw word meaning "icy creek". The Choctaw had long occupied much of this territory prior to European exploration and United States acquisition.

Mississippi State University, a public research university and land-grant institution, is in Oktibbeha County.

Oktibbeha County is conterminous with the Starkville, MS Micropolitian Statistical Area. The county is part of the Golden Triangle region of Mississippi, designated for joint regional development strategies.

== History ==
The name Oktibbeha is from a Choctaw phrase meaning "ice, there in the creek." Indian artifacts more than 2,000 years old have been found near ancient earthwork mounds located just east of Starkville, showing the area has been inhabited at least this long. The artifacts have been used to date the construction of the mounds to the Woodland period, ending about 1000 A.D. The Choctaw people occupied extensive territory in this area for centuries prior to European encounter. European-American settlers named the Indian Mound Campground nearby for the earthwork monuments.

Artifacts in the form of clay pot fragments and artwork dating from that period have been found at the Herman Mound and Village site, which is listed on the National Register of Historic Places. It can be accessed from the Indian Mound Campground.

American settlement of the area was started formally in the 1830s during the period of Indian Removal initiated by President Andrew Jackson. The Choctaw of Oktibbeha County ceded their claims to land in the area to the United States in the Treaty of Dancing Rabbit Creek in 1830. They were removed to other lands west of the Mississippi River, in Indian Territory, part of what became the state of Oklahoma.

Like the indigenous peoples before them, European Americans were drawn to the Starkville area because of two large natural springs. The Choctaw Agency was set up near what is now Sturgis, first to trade and manage relations with the Choctaw. What was originally a trading post was located on Old Robinson Road, about 1.5 mi (2.4 km) east of the Noxubee River. Later the Choctaw Agency organized the sale of the former Choctaw lands to migrants arriving from other areas of the United States.

A lumber mill was established southwest of town; it produced clapboards, from which the settlement took its original name of Boardtown. In 1835, Boardtown was established as the county seat of Oktibbeha County. Its name was changed to Starkville in honor of Revolutionary War hero General John Stark.

After the Civil War, three groups of the Ku Klux Klan arose in the county: in Starkville, at Choctaw Agency (Sturgis), and in Double Springs. They used violence against blacks to try to suppress their vote and maintain white supremacy. Freedmen had largely joined the Republican Party, headed by President Abraham Lincoln, who had gained their emancipation and supported constitutional amendments to grant them citizenship and the franchise. Every election cycle was accompanied by violence of white Democrats against the mostly black Republicans.

In 1876, for example, a group of 18 white men known as White-Liners, led by Dorsey Outlaw, surrounded the Republican Club in Chapel Hill near Choctaw Agency. They fired upon the black members from ambush, shooting several in the back. Charles Curry was killed instantly, and 36 blacks were wounded, four of them possibly mortally. Jeff Gregory died the following day. The same group of White-Liners traveled to Artesia the next day to intimidate black voters there, and on to Columbus the next day.

Following Reconstruction, white conservative Democrats dominated the state legislature. Mississippi State University (originally known as Agricultural and Mechanical College of the State of Mississippi) was founded near Starkville in 1878 as a land-grant university. It has become a major research university.

=== 20th century to present ===
In 1912 Mann Hamilton, a black man, was accused of assaulting June Bell, a white woman, at Bell's school house near Maben. Although Sheriff Nickles tried to gain custody of the suspect, he was directed to the wrong location. Hamilton was captured, lynched, and hanged by a white mob without any trial. This was one of six lynchings of African Americans committed by whites in the county in the post-Reconstruction period and extending into the early 20th century.

In 1960, seven black men from Little Rock, Arkansas used the only restroom at Weaver's Amoco in Osborn; it was designated for whites only. They were arrested at Mayhew Junction in Lowndes County, and required to pay a $200 per person bond. According to the law, they faced a maximum penalty of six months in jail and fines of $500 each. The case was widely anticipated as the first test of the state's sit-in law, but was settled when the defendants unexpectedly pleaded guilty and paid small fines at the county court in Starkville the next day.

Since the late 20th century, Oktibbeha, along with Clay and Lowndes counties, has been designated as the Golden Triangle in Mississippi. The three counties share a goal of collaborative economic development; they have had a history of rural and agricultural development.

== Geography ==
According to the U.S. Census Bureau, the county has a total area of 462 square miles (1,200 km^{2}), of which 458 square miles (1,190 km^{2}) is land and 3.7 square miles (9.6 km^{2}) (0.8%) is water. The majority of the county lies within the Black Belt geological formation of fertile uplands, which had supported extensive cotton plantations, while portions of the county are in the Flatwoods region.

=== Major highways ===
- U.S. Highway 82
- Mississippi Highway 12
- Mississippi Highway 25

=== Adjacent counties ===
- Noxubee County (southeast)
- Winston County (south)
- Choctaw County (west)
- Webster County (northwest)
- Clay County (north)
- Lowndes County (east)

=== National protected areas ===
- Noxubee National Wildlife Refuge (part)
- Tombigbee National Forest (part)

== Demographics ==
There was a marked decline from 1910 to 1920, a period when the Great Migration (African American) of African Americans out of the rural South began. Before 1940 a total of 1.5 million African Americans went to northern and Midwestern industrial cities to find work.

Historical population
Census	Pop.	Note	%±
1840	4,276		—
1850	9,171		114.5%
1860	12,977		41.5%
1870	14,891		14.7%
1880	15,978		7.3%
1890	17,694		10.7%
1900	20,183		14.1%
1910	19,676		−2.5%
1920	16,872		−14.3%
1930	19,119		13.3%
1940	22,151		15.9%
1950	24,569		10.9%
1960	26,175		6.5%
1970	28,752		9.8%
1980	36,018		25.3%
1990	38,375		6.5%
2000	42,902		11.8%
2010	47,671		11.1%
2020	51,788		8.6%
2025 (est.)	51,896	▲	0.2%
U.S. Decennial Census; 1790-1960 1900-1990; 1990-2000 2010-2013

=== Racial and ethnic composition ===
Oktibbeha County, Mississippi – Racial and ethnic composition Note: the US Census treats Hispanic/Latino as an ethnic category. This table excludes Latinos from the racial categories and assigns them to a separate category. Hispanics/Latinos may be of any race.
Race / Ethnicity (NH = Non-Hispanic)	Pop 1980	Pop 1990	Pop 2000	Pop 2010	Pop 2020	% 1980	% 1990	% 2000	% 2010	% 2020
White alone (NH)	22,959	23,871	24,973	27,825	29,224	63.74%	62.20%	58.21%	58.37%	56.43%
Black or African American alone (NH)	12,243	13,131	15,994	17,356	18,228	33.99%	34.22%	37.28%	36.41%	35.20%
Native American or Alaska Native alone (NH)	31	29	69	83	93	0.09%	0.08%	0.16%	0.17%	0.18%
Asian alone (NH)	283	1,002	1,084	1,151	1,506	0.79%	2.61%	2.53%	2.41%	2.91%
Native Hawaiian or Pacific Islander alone (NH)	x	x	12	12	10	x	x	0.03%	0.03%	0.02%
Other race alone (NH)	135	12	28	46	231	0.37%	0.03%	0.07%	0.10%	0.45%
Mixed race or Multiracial (NH)	x	x	281	515	1,228	x	x	0.65%	1.08%	2.37%
Hispanic or Latino (any race)	367	330	461	683	1,268	1.02%	0.86%	1.07%	1.43%	2.45%
Total	36,018	38,375	42,902	47,671	51,788	100.00%	100.00%	100.00%	100.00%	100.00%

=== 2020 census ===
As of the 2020 census, the county had a population of 51,788. The median age was 27.3 years. 17.4% of residents were under the age of 18 and 12.4% of residents were 65 years of age or older. For every 100 females there were 93.2 males, and for every 100 females age 18 and over there were 90.8 males age 18 and over.

The racial makeup of the county was 57.2% White, 35.4% Black or African American, 0.2% American Indian and Alaska Native, 2.9% Asian, <0.1% Native Hawaiian and Pacific Islander, 1.2% from some other race, and 3.1% from two or more races. Hispanic or Latino residents of any race comprised 2.4% of the population.

63.4% of residents lived in urban areas, while 36.6% lived in rural areas.

There were 21,011 households in the county, of which 23.9% had children under the age of 18 living in them. Of all households, 31.7% were married-couple households, 26.4% were households with a male householder and no spouse or partner present, and 37.1% were households with a female householder and no spouse or partner present. About 37.0% of all households were made up of individuals and 8.7% had someone living alone who was 65 years of age or older.

There were 25,372 housing units, of which 17.2% were vacant. Among occupied housing units, 48.3% were owner-occupied and 51.7% were renter-occupied. The homeowner vacancy rate was 2.0% and the rental vacancy rate was 17.3%.

=== 2010 census ===
As of the 2010 United States census, there were 47,671 people living in the county. 59.2% were White, 36.6% Black or African American, 2.4% Asian, 0.2% Native American, 0.4% of some other race and 1.2% of two or more races. 1.4% were Hispanic or Latino (of any race).

=== 2000 census ===
As of the census of 2000, there were 42,902 people, 15,945 households, and 9,264 families living in the county. The population density was 94 people per square mile (36 people/km^{2}). There were 17,344 housing units at an average density of 38 per square mile (15/km^{2}). The racial makeup of the county was 58.66% White, 37.43% Black or African American, 0.16% Native American, 2.53% Asian, 0.03% Pacific Islander, 0.47% from other races, and 0.71% from two or more races. 1.07% of the population were Hispanic or Latino of any race.

There were 15,945 households, out of which 28.20% had children under the age of 18 living with them, 39.90% were married couples living together, 14.80% had a female householder with no husband present, and 41.90% were non-families. 27.70% of all households were made up of individuals, and 6.70% had someone living alone who was 65 years of age or older. The average household size was 2.42 and the average family size was 3.03.

In the county, the population was spread out, with 21.00% under the age of 18, 29.60% from 18 to 24, 24.80% from 25 to 44, 16.00% from 45 to 64, and 8.60% who were 65 years of age or older. The median age was 25 years. For every 100 females there were 99.90 males. For every 100 females age 18 and over, there were 99.20 males.

The median income for a household in the county was $24,899, and the median income for a family was $36,914. Males had a median income of $32,162 versus $20,622 for females. The per capita income for the county was $14,998. About 18.00% of families and 28.20% of the population were below the poverty line, including 30.30% of those under age 18 and 17.80% of those age 65 or over.

== Government and politics ==
For much of the second half of the 20th century, Oktibbeha County was rather conservative for a county influenced by a college town. While most such counties trended Democratic in the 1990s, Oktibbeha County did not support the official Democratic candidate for president from 1956 to 2004. As in most of Mississippi, conservative white voters began moving away from their Solid South roots in the 1950s, when they started splitting their tickets at the national level and voting Republican.

In 2008, Democrat Barack Obama defeated Republican John McCain by six votes, becoming the first official Democratic candidate to win the county since 1956. By comparison, in 2004 Republican George Bush won Oktibbeha County over Democrat John Kerry 55% to 43%, as most of the majority whites still support Republicans at the national level. Obama carried the county again with an increased margin in 2012. Oktibbeha County voted for Joe Biden by nearly 6.5% in 2020, but narrowly flipped to Donald Trump in 2024.

Two small portions of the county are included within the 1st congressional district. Most of the county, including the city of Starkville and the campus of Mississippi State University, are included in the 3rd district.

United States presidential election results for Oktibbeha County, Mississippi
Year	Republican		Democratic		Third party(ies)	
Year	No.	%	No.	%	No.	%
1912	30	3.29%	851	93.31%	31	3.40%
1916	48	5.00%	911	94.90%	1	0.10%
1920	70	8.24%	778	91.64%	1	0.12%
1924	30	2.08%	1,370	95.01%	42	2.91%
1928	111	6.58%	1,577	93.42%	0	0.00%
1932	26	1.63%	1,574	98.38%	0	0.00%
1936	19	1.10%	1,714	98.85%	1	0.06%
1940	79	3.86%	1,951	95.45%	14	0.68%
1944	110	5.34%	1,948	94.66%	0	0.00%
1948	58	2.89%	158	7.88%	1,788	89.22%
1952	1,435	46.28%	1,666	53.72%	0	0.00%
1956	702	26.59%	1,552	58.79%	386	14.62%
1960	829	24.27%	915	26.79%	1,672	48.95%
1964	3,795	90.68%	390	9.32%	0	0.00%
1968	1,276	17.65%	1,826	25.26%	4,127	57.09%
1972	6,160	75.56%	1,880	23.06%	113	1.39%
1976	5,194	53.41%	4,339	44.62%	192	1.97%
1980	6,300	49.70%	6,039	47.64%	336	2.65%
1984	7,574	59.65%	5,097	40.14%	26	0.20%
1988	7,126	57.99%	5,100	41.50%	63	0.51%
1992	6,381	48.50%	5,726	43.52%	1,049	7.97%
1996	6,142	49.04%	5,923	47.29%	459	3.66%
2000	7,959	53.76%	6,443	43.52%	402	2.72%
2004	9,068	55.70%	7,015	43.09%	196	1.20%
2008	9,320	49.60%	9,326	49.63%	146	0.78%
2012	8,761	48.36%	9,095	50.20%	261	1.44%
2016	8,576	47.32%	8,859	48.88%	689	3.80%
2020	9,004	45.57%	10,299	52.13%	454	2.30%
2024	8,901	49.31%	8,851	49.03%	299	1.66%

== Education ==
The county has one school district: Starkville Oktibbeha Consolidated School District since 2013.

At one time, the county was served by a number of single-teacher schools. Gradually these were consolidated into larger schools, including Starkville High School, Longview High School, the Self Creek Consolidated School district, and many others.

By 1922, there were about twenty small public schools for African-American children across the rural county. The county maintained a segregated public school system until 1970, although the US Supreme Court had ruled in Brown v. Board of Education (1954) that such arrangements were unconstitutional. Schools for African-American students were historically underfunded.

In 1922, community groups arranged to match funds from the Rosenwald Foundation in order to build and operate improved rural schools for these children; the first two were erected in the communities of Trim Cane and in Turnpike. A total of eight Rosenwald Schools were built in the county between 1922 and 1927. The largest of these, Oktibbeha County Training School, was opened in 1926 at a cost of $127,000. Other schools included a three-teacher school in Longview, Maben Colored School with two teachers; Pleasant Grove, which had four teachers; True Vine school (3 teachers), and Rock Hill School, which also had four teachers.

Until 2013, Oktibbeha County was served by both the Oktibbeha County School District and the Starkville Public School District. Until 1970, the schools were segregated. From 1923 until 1970, African Americans attended schools that were located on US Highway 82, which is now known as Dr. Martin Luther King, Jr. Boulevard. These schools, originally built with Rosenwald funds, were variously known as the Oktibbeha County Training School, Rosenwald School, and Henderson High School. In 1970 the schools were integrated. Henderson was designated as the junior high school. The Rosenwald School was destroyed in a fire. This site now hosts Henderson-Ward Stewart Elementary, which was built on the site of Ward Elementary in 2010 for a cost of $4.8 million.

In 2013, the Mississippi Legislature passed a bill requiring that all Oktibbeha County schools be merged into the Starkville School District, in order to consolidate administration.

The county has two private schools: Starkville Academy was founded in 1969 as a segregation academy to avoid integration, and Starkville Christian School, which was founded in 1995.

=== Higher education ===
In terms of higher education, Oktibbeha County is within the service area of the East Mississippi Community College system. The campus of Mississippi State University is located in Oktibbeha County, partially in Starkville and partially in an unincorporated area. Its growth has led the Starkville to become the largest city by population in the Golden Triangle.

=== Public libraries ===
The county also runs the Starkville-Oktibbeha County Public Library System.

== Communities ==
=== City ===
- Starkville (county seat)

=== Towns ===
- Maben (partly in Webster County)
- Sturgis

=== Census-designated places ===
- Longview
- Mississippi State

=== Other unincorporated communities ===
- Adaton
- Bradley
- Clayton Village
- Hickory Grove
- Hickory Grove Estates
- Morgantown
- Muldrow
- Oktoc
- Osborn
- Self Creek
- Sessums

=== Historical/ghost towns ===
- Agency
- Double Springs

== See also ==
- National Register of Historic Places listings in Oktibbeha County, Mississippi
