= National Register of Historic Places listings in Attala County, Mississippi =

Location of Attala County in Mississippi

This is a list of the National Register of Historic Places listings in Attala County, Mississippi.

This is intended to be a complete list of the properties and districts on the National Register of Historic Places in Attala County, Mississippi, United States. Latitude and longitude coordinates are provided for many National Register properties and districts; these locations may be seen together in a map.

There are 20 properties and districts listed on the National Register in the county.

This National Park Service list is complete through NPS recent listings posted March 14, 2025.

== Current listings ==
| | Name on the Register | Image | Date listed | Location | City or town | Description |
|---|---|---|---|---|---|---|
| 1 | Col. Chap Anderson House | Col. Chap Anderson House | February 26, 1987 (#87000233) | 402 N. Jackson St. 33°03′39″N 89°35′22″W | Kosciusko | |
| 2 | Attala County Courthouse and Confederate Monument | Attala County Courthouse and Confederate Monument | November 17, 1997 (#97001299) | 230 W. Washington St. 33°03′30″N 89°35′24″W | Kosciusko | |
| 3 | George Washington Brett House | | July 8, 2010 (#10000440) | 3021 Attala Rd. 3220; 33°15′05″N 89°33′59″W | West vicinity | |
| 4 | David L. Brown House | David L. Brown House | December 2, 1977 (#77000784) | 200 E. Washington St. 33°03′32″N 89°35′18″W | Kosciusko | |
| 5 | Col. J.K. Coffey House | Col. J.K. Coffey House | February 8, 1979 (#79001306) | East of Sallis off Mississippi Highway 12; 33°02′06″N 89°43′54″W | Sallis | |
| 6 | Hull L.V. Home and Studio | | June 17, 2024 (#100010441) | 123 Allen Street; 33°03′04″N 89°35′10″W | Kosciusko | |
| 7 | Jackson-Browne House | Jackson-Browne House | February 5, 1987 (#87000038) | 107 N. Wells St. 33°03′25″N 89°35′36″W | Kosciusko | |
| 8 | Jackson-Niles House | Jackson-Niles House | September 27, 1984 (#84002127) | 121 N. Wells St. 33°03′32″N 89°35′37″W | Kosciusko | |
| 9 | Johnson-Sullivant House | | June 26, 1986 (#86001385) | 709 S. Wells St. 33°03′21″N 89°35′35″W | Kosciusko | |
| 10 | John Kimbrough Hall House | | March 5, 1998 (#98000184) | 5 miles north-northwest of Ethel; 33°11′33″N 89°29′28″W | Ethel | |
| 11 | Kosciusko Historic District | | March 31, 2009 (#08001084) | Roughly bounded by the Illinois, N. Wells, S. Natchez, Galloway, Bobo, S. Huntington, Jefferson St., and Highland Dr. 33°03′28″N 89°35′15″W | Kosciusko | |
| 12 | John Copeland Lucas House | | June 24, 1993 (#93000573) | 500 N. Huntington St. 33°03′43″N 89°35′13″W | Kosciusko | |
| 13 | Niles House | Niles House | March 11, 1998 (#98000186) | 401 N. Huntington St. 33°03′43″N 89°35′24″W | Kosciusko | |
| 14 | Judge Henry C. Niles House | Judge Henry C. Niles House | May 6, 1993 (#93000383) | 305 N. Huntington St. 33°03′35″N 89°35′16″W | Kosciusko | |
| 15 | Old First Presbyterian Church | Old First Presbyterian Church | July 10, 1992 (#92000846) | Junction of Huntington and Washington Sts. 33°03′31″N 89°35′15″W | Kosciusko | |
| 16 | Old Natchez Trace (212-3K 213-3K) | | November 7, 1976 (#76000203) | Northeast of Kosciusko; 33°12′46″N 89°27′11″W | Kosciusko | |
| 17 | Shrock House | | December 10, 1985 (#85003520) | Shrock Rd. 32°53′20″N 89°52′23″W | Goodman | |
| 18 | Simmons Farmhouse | | May 13, 2021 (#100006554) | 9968 MS 429; 33°00′44″N 89°45′51″W | Sallis vicinity | |
| 19 | Storer House | | July 25, 2003 (#03000688) | 300 N. Huntington St. 33°03′34″N 89°35′14″W | Kosciusko | |
| 20 | Thompson School | | June 24, 1994 (#94000647) | Ethel-McCool Rd., east of Ethel; 33°06′58″N 89°22′40″W | Ethel | |

== See also ==
- List of National Historic Landmarks in Mississippi
- National Register of Historic Places listings in Mississippi
