= Mississippi Highway 407 =

State highway in Mississippi

Mississippi Highway 407

Route information
- Maintained by MDOT, Attala County, Choctaw County
- Length: 33.013 mi (53.129 km)
- Existed: 1958–present

Southern segment
- Length: 8.262 mi (13.296 km)
- South end: MS 12 near McCool
- North end: MS 12 near Weir

Northern segment
- Length: 24.751 mi (39.833 km)
- South end: MS 413 in French Camp
- North end: US 51 in Winona

Location
- Country: United States
- State: Mississippi
- Counties: Attala, Choctaw, Montgomery, Carroll

Highway system
- Mississippi State Highway System; Interstate; US; State
← MS 404	→ MS 411

Mississippi Highway 407 (MS 407) is a two-lane wide state highway in central Mississippi consisting of two separate segments. The first segment connects the towns of McCool and Weir with MS 12 and is signed a north-south route. The second segment runs from French Camp at MS 413 west (but again signed north-south) to Winona at U.S. Route 51 (US 51). Most of the road is state maintained, however, a 5.5-mile-long (8.9 km) segment between McCool and Weir are maintained as county roads.

== Route description ==
The southernment segment of MS 407 begins at MS 12 west of McCool. The highway starts at a Y-intersection but soon curves to the east. The road passes a few homes before intersecting MS 411 and forming a concurrency towards town. The highway crosses Yockanookany River and enters the town limits of McCool. The two highways pass the town hall, a post office, a church, and houses before reaching the center of town where MS 411 breaks off to the south along Allen Street. MS 407 continues east, then curves to the northeast. After passing County Road 2026 (CR 2026) still within the town limits, state maintenance of MS 407 ends, the highway becomes unsigned, and the road continues northeast as Weir-McCool Road. Continuing through Attala County and then Choctaw County, MS 407 heads mainly through woodlands with some houses along the road. At an intersection with Weir-Panhandle Road, MS 407 travels north towards Weir. Upon entering Weir, the road makes a slight curve to the northeast and becomes known as South Ann Street as it passes through a residential neighborhood. In the center of Weir, MS 407 reaches the southern terminus of MS 413 at Front Street. At this point, state maintenance resumes however signage for MS 407 is not present here. After leaving town, the road name changes to Weir-Salem Road, but ends shortly thereafter at MS 12. At this intersection, signage for MS 407 is present.

MS 407's northern segment begins in the town of French Camp at MS 413, about 660 feet (200 m) west of the latter's intersection with the Natchez Trace Parkway. MS 407 heads west northwest (but signed as north) out of the town limits past a few homes and between a pair of high voltage electrical substations. After heading past woods, open fields, and houses, the road enters Montgomery County. The highway passes through a rural area, intersecting the unsigned MS 43 at its northern terminus in the county. It reaches the settlement of Poplar Creek where some houses are located along the highway. After curving more to the northwest, MS 407 crosses the Big Black River before making a sweeping curve towards the west. The road briefly enters the northeasternmost portion of Carroll County where it heads through an unnamed settlement centered about its intersection with CR 430. Curving to the north, MS 407 reenters Montgomery County heading past open fields before turning to the northwest and heading through forest land. The state highway enters the city of Winona, but in its far reaches where sparse housing and some open fields are found along the road. The road heads through a clearing where it crosses a small creek and heads past the edge of Winona-Montgomery County Airport. After crossing a railroad at-grade, MS 407 heads through a more defined residential neighborhood. Before ending, MS 407 gains a center turn lane and passes an elementary school before reaching a T-intersection with US 51.

== History ==
The first segment of state highway that has since been incorporated into MS 407 was a short unnumbered spur route from MS 12 to McCool. The paved road was in place by 1950. Within the next year, another short unnumbered spur route was established from MS 12 south to Weir. An unimproved state highway was established between French Camp and Winona in 1956 without a number. In the next year, an extension of state road was established from Weir south towards McCool. By 1958, MS 407 had formally been established along the McCool-Weir and French Camp-Winona highways. The two segments of MS 407 have remained generally unchanged since then.

== Major intersections ==
County	Location	mi	km	Destinations	Notes
Attala		0.000	0.000	MS 12 – Kosciusko, Ackerman	Southern terminus
Attala		0.681	1.096	MS 411 north	Southern end of MS 411 concurrency
Attala	McCool	1.401	2.255	MS 411 south (Allen Street)	Northern end of MS 411 concurrency
Choctaw	Weir	7.414	11.932	MS 413 north (Front Street)	Southern terminus of MS 413
Choctaw		8.262	13.296	MS 12 / Weir Salem Road – Kosciusko, Ackerman	Northern terminus of southern segment
Gap in route
Choctaw	French Camp	8.262	13.296	MS 413 / Patterson Road – French Camp, Kilmichael	Southern terminus of northern segment
Montgomery		16.310	26.248	MS 43 south (Ellis Road)	Northern terminus of MS 43
Carroll	No major junctions				
Montgomery		33.013	53.129	US 51 (South Applegate Street) – Vaiden, Winona	Northern terminus
1.000 mi = 1.609 km; 1.000 km = 0.621 mi: Concurrency terminus
