= Mississippi Highway 429 =

State highway in Mississippi

Mississippi Highway 429

Route information
- Maintained by MDOT
- Length: 21.732 mi (34.974 km)
- Existed: 1956–present

Major junctions
- South end: Red Dog Road / Conway Road near Conway
- Natchez Trace Parkway near Thomastown; MS 43 in Thomastown; MS 14 near Bolatusha
- North end: MS 12 near Sallis

Location
- Country: United States
- State: Mississippi
- Counties: Leake, Attala

Highway system
- Mississippi State Highway System; Interstate; US; State
| ← MS 427 | → MS 430 |

Mississippi Highway 429 (MS 429) is a 21.7-mile-long (34.9 km) highway in the Mississippi counties of Leake and Attala. The highway runs through mostly rural areas of these counties except near its northern terminus where MS 429 heads through the town of Sallis.

== Route description ==
MS 429's southern terminus is in a rural area of Leake County, about 2.7 miles (4.3 km) south of Conway and seven miles (11 km) northwest of Carthage. This point is located at the intersection of Conway Road and Red Dog Road; Red Dog Road is the continuation of MS 429. The state highway heads northwest through a wooded area, making some bends around Smith Creek, before entering an older swath of trees as it crosses the Yockanookany River. After passing an abandoned high school, MS 429 intersects the Natchez Trace Parkway. Containing another 1/2 mile (0.80 km), it intersects MS 43 in the community of Thomastown where some small businesses, a post office, and houses are present. The road heads north through more woodlands, crossing many underground pipelines through this area. MS 429 reaches the settlement of Bolatusha where a Methodist church and cemetery are located. As it heads further north, the highway crosses into Attala County and passes through some farms before reaching MS 14 at the settlement of Zemuly.

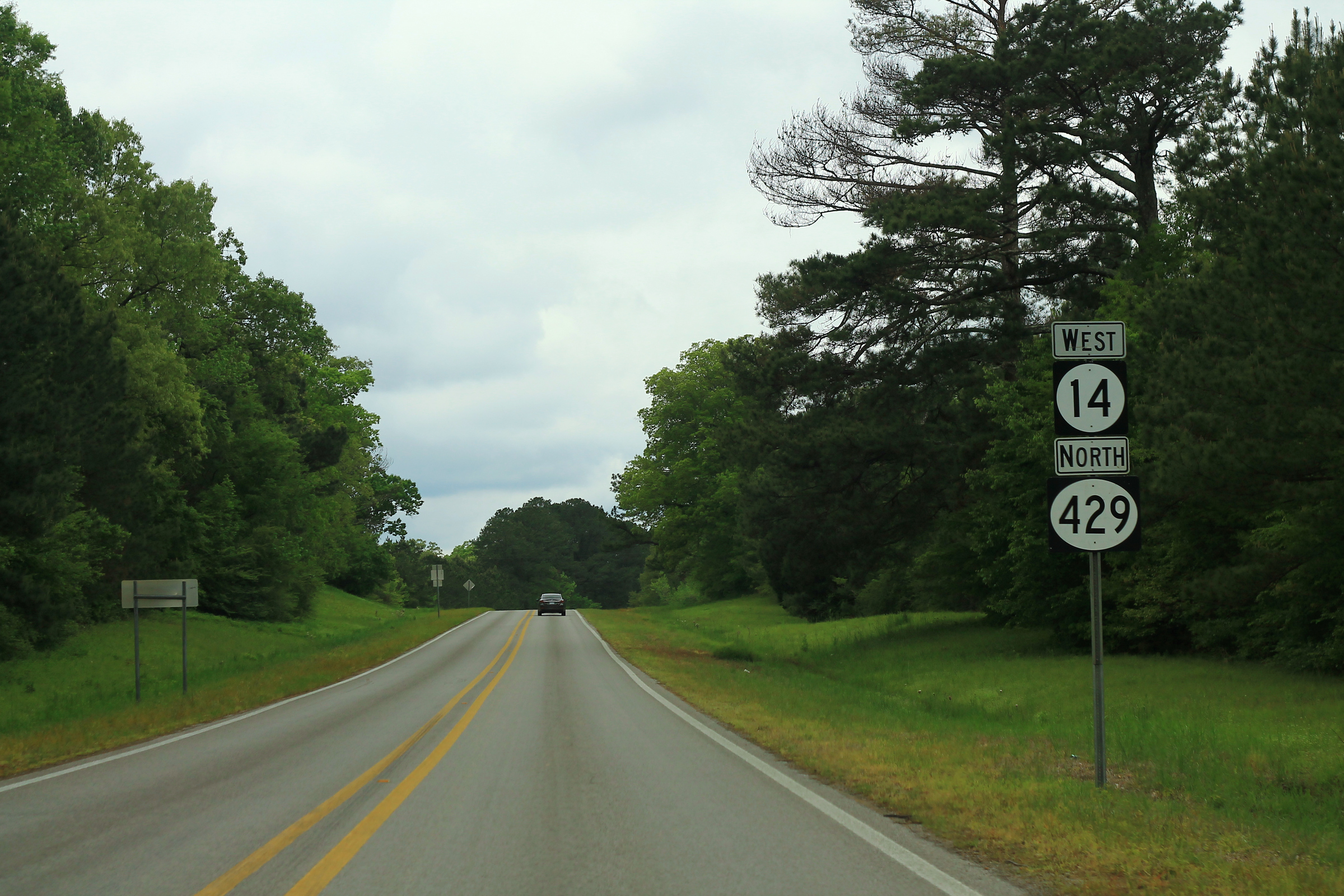
MS 429 along its concurrency with MS 14

The two highways form a concurrency where MS 429 physically travels west along westbound MS 14. Heading through a mix of houses, open fields, and woods, MS 14 ends its concurrency at the settlement of Newport and resumes a northerly heading. The highway travels through woods, then some open fields line the road as it crosses small streams. Now starting to approach Sallis, MS 429 passes an elementary school and crosses Long Creek. It enters the town of Sallis, passes an abaondoned Illinois Central Railroad crossing, and reaches the southern terminus of MS 431 at Front Street. Around the Front Street intersection, the state highway fronts the town post office and a general store. Heading up a small hill, MS 429 passes a Baptist church, many houses, and a cemetery before exiting the corporate limits of Sallis. About 1/4 mile (0.40 km) from the town line, MS 429 ends at an intersection with MS 12 where the road continues north as County Road 4222.

== History ==
The first part of MS 429 that was incorporated into the state highway system was an unnumbered spur from MS 12 to Sallis created around 1951. MS 429 was formally created around 1955 running from Goodman, crossing the Big Black River, traveling to Newport, then traveling north to Sallis and MS 12. The initial construction was performed by Holmes and Attala counties by upgrading existing bridges and roads to state highway standards. By 1957, however, the road from Goodman to Newport and west became part of MS 14 and MS 429 was changed to extend south from MS 14 to the Leake County line. It was extended further south to the Natchez Trace Parkway by 1960, to a point near Carthage by 1965, and to MS 35 in Carthage by 1967.

The 8-mile (13 km) portion of Red Dog Road to Carthage had never formally had maintenance taken over by the state and remains under county and local control to this day. This segment was formally removed from the state numbered system between 1996 and 1998. However, signage along MS 35 and MS 25 specifically denote northbound Red Dog Road as "To MS 429."

== Major intersections ==
| County | Location | mi | km | Destinations | Notes |
|---|---|---|---|---|---|
| Leake | | 0.000 | 0.000 | Red Dog Road / Conway Road | Southern terminus |
| Leake | | 4.507 | 7.253 | Natchez Trace Parkway – Tupelo, Jackson | |
| Leake | Thomastown | 5.040 | 8.111 | MS 43 – Canton, Kosciusko | |
| Attala | Zemuly | 12.443 | 20.025 | MS 14 east / CR 4163 – Kosciusko | Southern end of MS 14 concurrency |
| Attala | Newport | 15.161 | 24.399 | MS 14 west – Goodman | Northern end of MS 14 concurrency |
| Attala | Sallis | 21.031 | 33.846 | MS 431 north (Front Street) | Southern terminus of MS 431 |
| Attala | | 21.732 | 34.974 | MS 12 / CR 4222 | Northern terminus |
1.000 mi = 1.609 km; 1.000 km = 0.621 mi: Concurrency terminus
