= Mississippi Highway 12 =

State Highway in Mississippi

Mississippi Highway 12
- MS 12 in red, unsigned extension of MS 12 in Columbus in blue

Route information
- Maintained by MDOT
- Length: 198.7 mi (319.8 km) (162.389 mi excluding concurrencies)
- Existed: 1932–present

Major junctions
- West end: MS 1 in James
- US 61 in Hollandale; US 49W in Belzoni; US 49E in Tchula; I-55 in Durant; US 51 in Durant; US 82 in Starkville; US 45 Alt. in Mayhew; US 45 / US 82 in Columbus
- East end: SR 18 near Caledonia

Location
- Country: United States
- State: Mississippi
- Counties: Washington, Humphreys, Holmes, Attala, Choctaw, Oktibbeha, Lowndes

Highway system
- Mississippi State Highway System; Interstate; US; State
← US 11	→ MS 13

Mississippi Highway 12 (MS 12) is a state highway in northern Mississippi that runs 198.7 miles (319.8 km) west–east from MS 1 west of Hollandale at the Mississippi River to State Route 18 (SR 18) at the Alabama state line northeast of Columbus. MS 12 traverses three major regions of the state, the Mississippi Delta, the North Central Hills, and the Golden Triangle.

== Route description ==
MS 12 begins the Mississippi Delta region in Washington County at an intersection with MS 1 (part of the Great River Road) thirteen miles south of Greenville, not even a mile from the banks of the Mississippi River, and only five miles north of Lake Washington. The highway heads east through flat farmland as a two-lane highway to travel through Leroy Percy State Park, where it crosses Silver Creek Bayou, before entering Hollandale. MS 12 enters town along W Washington Street, makes a right in downtown onto East Avenue S, then left onto E Crouch Street to cross Deer Creek and come to an intersection with US 61. The highway now leaves Hollandale and continues east through rural farmland for several miles to cross the Sunflower River into Humphreys County.

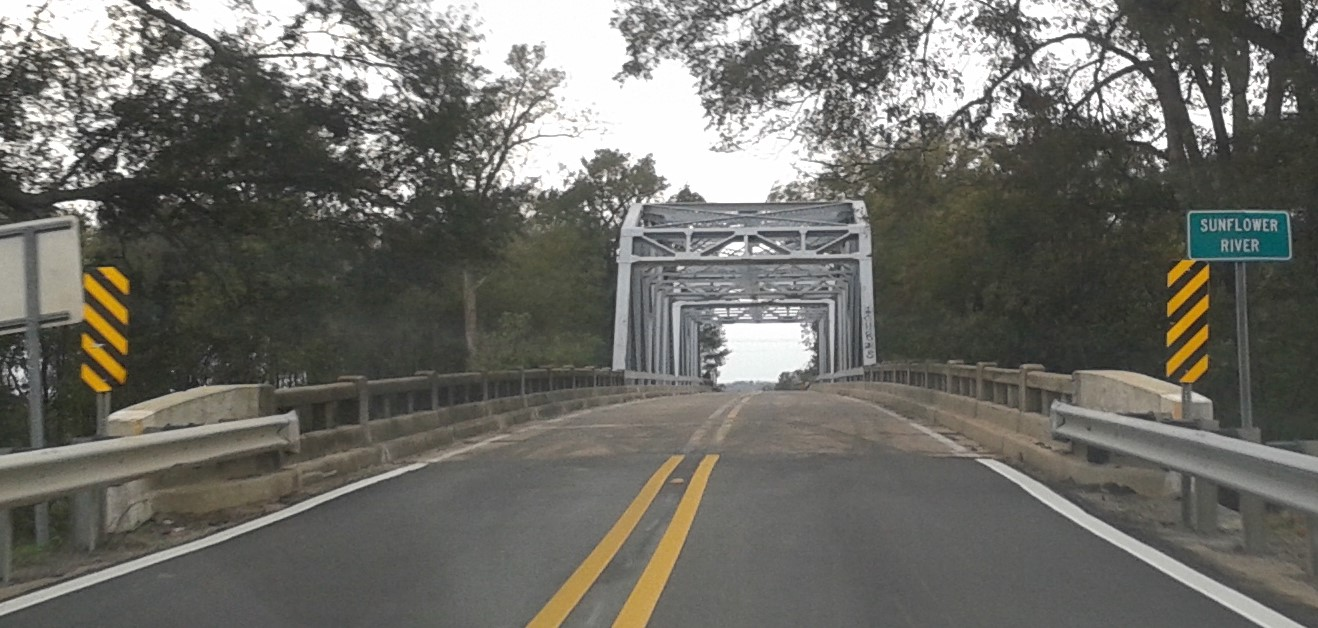
Westbound on MS 12 bridge over the Sunflower River from Humphreys County, Mississippi

MS 12 continues east through farmland for several miles to enter Belzoni and immediately come to an intersection between US 49W (unsigned MS 3) and MS 7 just west of downtown. The road continues as MS 7 (1st Street) into downtown while MS 12 becomes concurrent with US 49W/MS 3 and they head south as a four-lane to bypass downtown. MS 12 breaks off as a two-lane shortly thereafter and goes east to cross the Yazoo River to leave Belzoni. The highway continues east through rural farmland and woodlands for several miles to enter Holmes County.

MS 12 crosses Tchula Lake before traveling along the southern edge of Marcella and coming to an intersection and becoming concurrent with US 49E. They head northeast for a few miles to travel through Mileston before entering Tchula, with MS 12 splitting off and heading east just south of downtown. MS 12 climbs some Loess bluffs onto the North Central Hills region, crossing Fannegusha Creek and passing in between the Morgan Brake National Wildlife Refuge and the Hillside National Wildlife Refuge. It now travels southeast through woodlands for several miles to enter Lexington. The highway passes through neighborhoods before turning south and becoming concurrent with MS 17 at a Y-Intersection. MS 12/MS 17 continue along Carrollton Street through neighborhoods to enter downtown, with MS 12 splitting off along Depot Street at a Roundabout around the Holmes County Courthouse. The highway heads east to leave downtown to cross a creek and have an intersection with MS 836 (the new Lexington Bypass) before heading through a business district. It crosses another creek before leaving Lexington and traveling through some farmland and wooded areas for several miles, where it passes through Owen Wells, to have an interchange with I-55 (Exit 156) and entering Durant. MS 12 heads southeast through a business district before turning south along US 51 (N Jackson Street) through neighborhoods into downtown. MS 12 splits off along E Mulberry Street at the center of town, heading east to cross some rail road tracks to pass through more neighborhoods before leaving Durant and traveling through swamplands, crossing the Big Black River into Attala County.

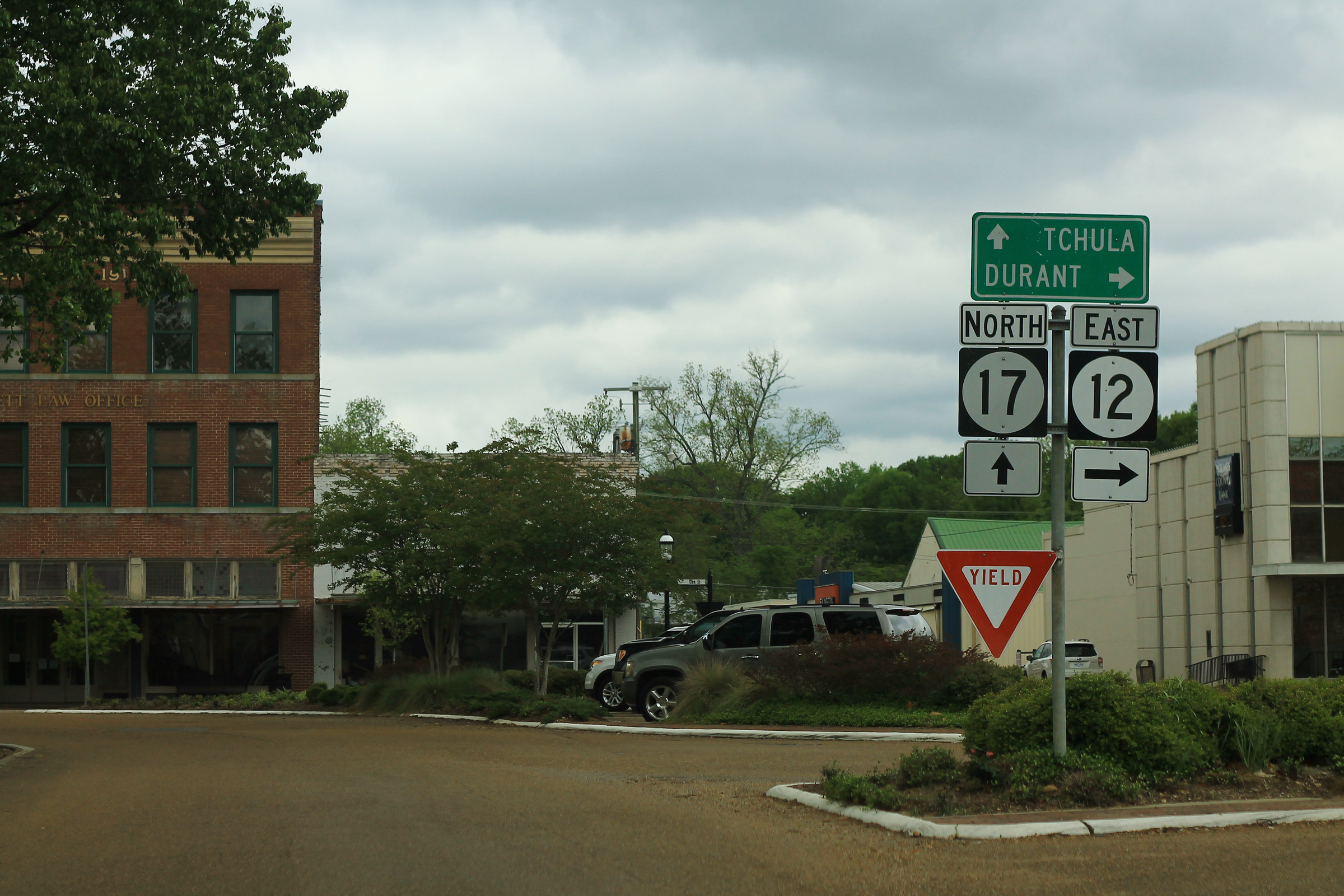
MS 12/MS 17 roundabout around Holmes County Courthouse in downtown Lexington

MS 12 travels through a mix of farmland and wooded areas for the next several miles, passing through Sallis, where it has intersections with MS 429 and MS 431, and McAdams, before becoming concurrent with MS 43 and entering Kosciusko. The highway bypasses downtown along its western and northern sides, having intersections with MS 735, splitting off from MS 43, as well as having intersections with MS 19 and MS 35. MS 12 now leaves Kosciusko and heads northeast through woodlands to have an interchange with the Natchez Trace Parkway before traveling through Ethel, bypassing the town to the north while its business loop, MS 739, passes straight through downtown. The continues northeast through wooded areas for several miles to pass just west of McCool, where it has its first intersection with MS 407 (as well as with MS 411), before crossing into Choctaw County.

Between Kosciusko and Ackerman, MS 12 runs parallel to the Yockanookany River. MS 12 continues northeast through woodlands to travel through Weir, passing along the north side of town to have intersections with MS 413 and its second and final with MS 407, before entering Ackerman. The highway passes along the northern side of town, bypassing downtown as it travels through a business district and has intersections with MS 9, MS 15, as well as with its unsigned business loop MS 759 (W Main Street/College Street). MS 12 now leaves Ackerman and winds its way east through remote, hilly, and wooded terrain for the next several miles to cross into Oktibbeha County. This section of the highway lies within the Tombigbee National Forest.

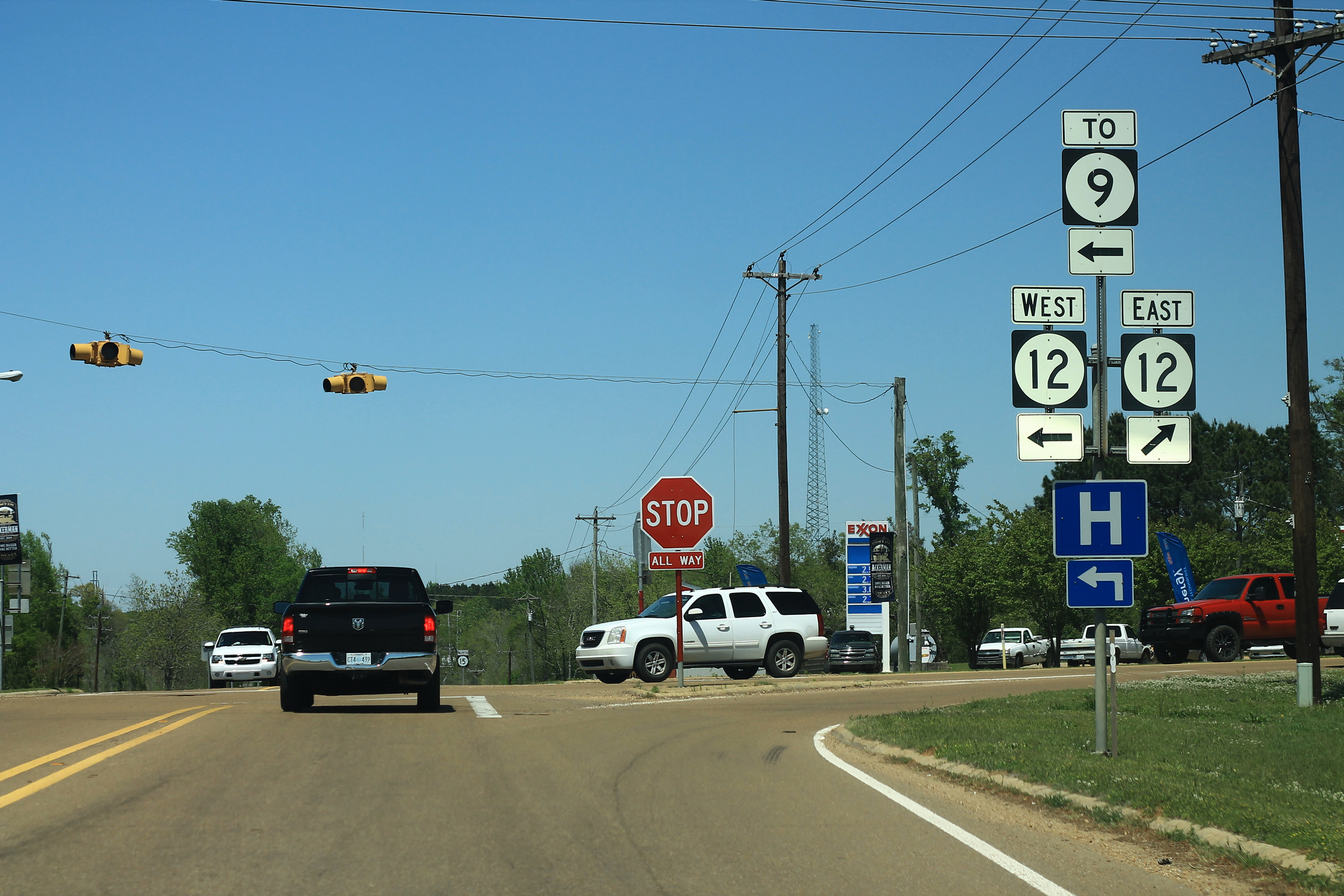
MS 15's junction with MS 12 in Ackerman

MS 12 now enters the Golden Triangle region and travels through Sturgis, Bradley, and Longview before entering Starkville to have an interchange with MS 25 in some neighborhoods. The highway widens to a four-lane undivided boulevard as it passes along the north side of George M. Bryan Airport and passes through a major business district on the south side of downtown. MS 12 makes a sharp curve to the north at an interchange with Bully Boulevard (unsigned MS 775), the main access into Mississippi State University. The highway now becomes a four-lane divided expressway, having interchanges with Collegeview Street and MS 182, before joining the US 82/MS 25 four-lane freeway. US 82/MS 12/MS 25 head east to leave Starkville and pass through Clayton Village, where it has another intersection with MS 182, before heading through farmland to cross into Lowndes County.

The freeway immediately has an interchange with US 45 Alternate, where MS 25 splits off, and US 82/MS 12 continues east to pass through Mayhew, and have an interchange with MS 791 (which provides access to Golden Triangle Regional Airport), prior to entering Columbus. The freeway has an interchange and becomes concurrent with US 45 before crossing a bridge over the Tombigbee River (part of the Tennessee Tombigbee Waterway) and bypassing downtown to the north, having interchanges with MS 182, MS 69 (where US 45 splits off and MS 50 joins the concurrency), as well as 18th Avenue N and Military Road, before crossing over Luxapalila Creek. MS 12/MS 50 split off the US 82 freeway at an interchange with Tuscaloosa Road, with them heading east through a business district as a four-lane boulevard, with MS 12 splitting off and heading north as a two-lane shortly thereafter. MS 12 leaves Columbus and travels northeast through farmland for the next several miles, where it crosses another bridge over Luxapalila Creek and passes through Woodlawn (as well as having intersections with Seed Tick Road and Caledonia-Vernon Road, both of which are county roads that lead to nearby Caledonia), before coming to the Alabama state line, with the road continuing east into Alabama as State Route 18 (SR 18).

== Major intersections ==
County	Location	mi	km	Destinations	Notes
Washington		0.0	0.0	MS 1 / Great River Road – Glen Allan, Greenville	Western terminus
Washington	Leroy Percy State Park	7.6	12.2	Leroy Percy State Park main entrance	Access road into park
Washington	Hollandale	13.2	21.2	US 61 – Leland, Vicksburg	
Humphreys	Belzoni	33.7	54.2	US 49W north (MS 3 north) / MS 7 north – Indianola, Wister Gardens	West end of US 49W/MS 3 overlap
Humphreys		34.4	55.4	US 49W south (MS 3 south) – Yazoo City	East end of US 49W/MS 3 overlap
Holmes		49.3	79.3	US 49E south – Yazoo City, Jackson	West end of US 49E overlap
Holmes	Tchula	56.2	90.4	US 49E north – Greenwood	East end of US 49E overlap
Holmes	Lexington	67.0	107.8	MS 17 north – Blackhawk, Carrollton	West end of MS 17 overlap
Holmes	Lexington	67.3	108.3	MS 17 south – Pickens	East end of MS 17 overlap; traffic circle around Holmes County Courthouse
Holmes	Lexington	67.8	109.1	MS 836 west to MS 17 south – Pickens	Eastern terminus of MS 836
Holmes		76.6– 77.0	123.3– 123.9	I-55 – Grenada, Jackson	I-55 exit 156
Holmes	Durant	79.7	128.3	US 51 north – West, Winona	West end of US 51 overlap
Holmes	Durant	80.3	129.2	US 51 south – Goodman	East end of US 51 overlap
Attala		86.4	139.0	MS 429 south – Sallis	Northern terminus of MS 429
Attala		87.5	140.8	MS 431 south – Sallis	Northern terminus of MS 431
Attala		95.3	153.4	MS 43 south	West end of MS 43 overlap
Attala		95.7	154.0	MS 735 north – Downtown Kosciusko	Southern terminus of MS 735; old MS 12
Attala	Kosciusko	98.0	157.7	MS 19 north / MS 35 north (North Jackson Street) – Vaiden, Kosciusko	West end of MS 19 / MS 35 overlap
Attala	Kosciusko	98.2	158.0	MS 43 north (North Natchez Street)	East end of MS 43 overlap
Attala	Kosciusko	98.7	158.8	MS 19 south / MS 35 south – Carthage	East end of MS 19 / MS 35 overlap
Attala	Kosciusko	99.6	160.3	MS 735 south (E Jefferson Street) – Downtown Kosciusko	Northern terminus of MS 735; Old MS 12
Attala		103.0– 103.5	165.8– 166.6	Natchez Trace Parkway	Interchange
Attala		105.5	169.8	MS 739 north – Downtown Ethel	Southern terminus of MS 739; old MS 12
Attala	Ethel	106.9	172.0	MS 739 south (Pope Street) – Downtown Ethel	Northern terminus of MS 739; old MS 12
Attala		114.5	184.3	MS 407 north – McCool	Southern terminus of MS 407; old MS 12
Attala		115.3	185.6	MS 411 south – McCool	Northern terminus of MS 411
Choctaw		121.0	194.7	MS 413 (Bruce Street) – French Camp, Weir	
Choctaw		21.9	35.2	MS 407 south (Weir-Salem Road) – Weir	Northern terminus of MS 407; old MS 12
Choctaw		127.8	205.7	Downtown Ackerman (W Main Street/MS 759 East)	Old MS 12; western terminus of unsigned MS 759
Choctaw	Ackerman	128.6	207.0	MS 9 north – Eupora	Southern terminus of MS 9
Choctaw	Ackerman	128.8	207.3	MS 15 – Houston, Louisville, Choctaw Lake	
Choctaw		129.6	208.6	Downtown Ackerman (College Street/MS 759 West)	Old MS 12; eastern terminus of unsigned MS 759
Oktibbeha	Starkville	150.4– 150.8	242.0– 242.7	MS 25 to US 82 – Louisville	Interchange
Oktibbeha	Starkville	153.7– 154.0	247.4– 247.8	Mississippi State University (Bully Boulevard/MS 775 east)	Interchange; eastbound exit and westbound entrance; western terminus of unsigned MS 775
Oktibbeha	Starkville	154.2– 154.4	248.2– 248.5	Collegeview Street - Mississippi State University	Interchange
Oktibbeha	Starkville	154.7– 155.1	249.0– 249.6	MS 182 – Mississippi State University	Interchange
Oktibbeha		156.2	251.4	US 82 west / MS 25 south – Winona, Louisville	Interchange; west end of US 82 / MS 25 overlap
see US 82
Lowndes	Columbus	182.2	293.2	US 82 east – Tuscaloosa	Interchange; east end of US 82 overlap
Lowndes	Columbus	183.2	294.8	MS 50 east – Millport	East end of MS 50 overlap
Lowndes		189.4	304.8	Steens Road - Steens	
Lowndes		192.7	310.1	Seed Tick Road - Caledonia	
Lowndes		198.1– 198.2	318.8– 319.0	Caledonia-Vernon Road - Caledonia	
Lowndes		198.7	319.8	SR 18 east – Vernon	Alabama state line; eastern terminus
1.000 mi = 1.609 km; 1.000 km = 0.621 mi: Concurrency terminus; Incomplete access
