= Mississippi Highway 413 =

State highway in Mississippi

Mississippi Highway 413

Route information
- Maintained by MDOT
- Length: 23.352 mi (37.581 km)
- Existed: 1950–present

Major junctions
- South end: MS 407 in Weir
- MS 15 near Weir; Natchez Trace Parkway in French Camp
- North end: MS 182 / MS 745 in Kilmichael

Location
- Country: United States
- State: Mississippi
- Counties: Choctaw, Attala, Montgomery

Highway system
- Mississippi State Highway System; Interstate; US; State
← MS 411	→ MS 415

Mississippi Highway 413 (MS 413) is a 23-mile-long (37 km) state highway in Choctaw and Montgomery counties in central Mississippi. Though it is signed as a north–south highway, the route generally runs from the southeast to northwest. The highway serves the towns of Weir, French Camp, and Kilmichael.

== Route description ==
MS 413 begins at an intersection with MS 407 (Ann Street) and Front Street in Weir. The highway proceeds west along Front Street until it reaches Bruce Street, at which time it heads northwest out of the town, crossing the Yockanookany River and MS 12. The road heads northwest through a mostly wooded area past a few homes before turning to due west. During this westerly heading, it briefly straddles the Choctaw-Attala county line. It resumes a northwest travel passing an unnamed settlement with a general store and church. It curves to the southwest but then resumes a westerly course as it heads into French Camp. MS 413 passes the entrance of French Camp Academy, businesses, and the Natchez Trace Parkway.

West of this intersection, MS 413 reaches the southern terminus of a separate segment of MS 407. MS 413 turns to the north, northeast, then northwest. It crosses into Montgomery County and reaches the community of Huntsville. Heading northwest through forestland, the highway crosses Big Black River and turns to the north. MS 413 heads past a small farm then enters the town of Kilmichael on River Road. It heads past a few houses before ending at a wide intersection with MS 182, the old alignment of U.S. Route 82, and the signed northern terminus of MS 745.

== History ==
A state highway connecting the Weir vicinity with Kilmichael by way of French Camp had existed since at least 1932. The road received its MS 413 designation in 1950. The road was slowly improved through the years bringing it to its entire length being paved by 1967.

== Major intersections ==
County	Location	mi	km	Destinations	Notes
Choctaw	Weir	0.000	0.000	MS 407 (Ann Street) / Front Street	Southern terminus
Choctaw		0.960	1.545	MS 12 – Kosciusko, Ackerman	
Choctaw	French Camp	7.917	12.741	Natchez Trace Parkway – Tupelo, Jackson	
Choctaw	French Camp	8.045	12.947	MS 407 north / Patterson Road – Winona	Southern terminus of MS 407 segment
Montgomery	Kilmichael	23.343– 23.352	37.567– 37.581	MS 182 (South Rutherford Drive) / MS 745 south (South Depot Avenue) to US 82 – Winona, Eupora	Northern terminus; northern terminus of MS 745
1.000 mi = 1.609 km; 1.000 km = 0.621 mi
