= 1995 Denver Broncos season =

American football team season

- Owner: Pat Bowlen
- General manager: John Beake and Mike Shanahan
- President: Pat Bowlen
- Head coach: Mike Shanahan
- Offensive coordinator: Gary Kubiak
- Defensive coordinator: Greg Robinson
- Home stadium: Mile High Stadium

Results
- Record: 8–8
- Division place: 4th AFC West
- Playoffs: Did not qualify

Uniform
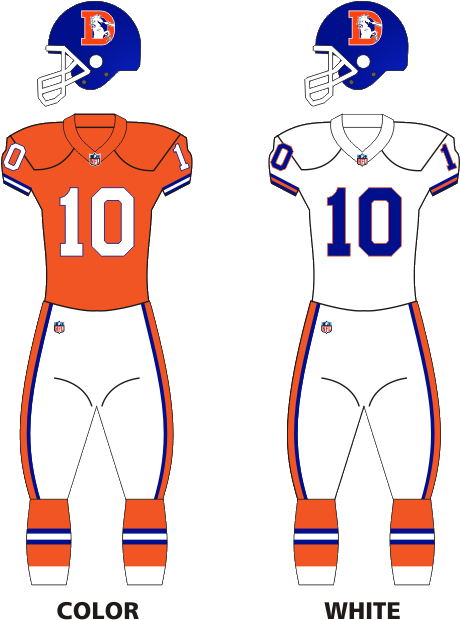

The 1995 Denver Broncos season was the franchise's 26th season in the National Football League, and the 36th overall. The season would be a turning point for the franchise, as being the first year that Mike Shanahan would be head coach, and that would include the drafting of future 2,000 yard rusher and Super Bowl MVP Terrell Davis.

== Off season ==
Additions	Subtractions
WR Ed McCaffrey (49ers)	LB Karl Mecklenburg (retirement)
S Tyrone Braxton (Dolphins)	LB Mike Croel (Giants)
S Tim Hauck (Packers)	G Dave Widell (Jaguars)
	DT Ted Washington (Bills)
	LB Richard Harvey (Saints)
	S Dennis Smith (retirement)

=== 1995 expansion draft ===
Denver Broncos selected during the expansion draft
Round	Overall	Name	Position	Expansion team
29	58	Charles Swann	Wide receiver	Carolina Panthers
30	59	Cedric Tillman	Wide receiver	Jacksonville Jaguars

=== NFL draft ===
1995 Denver Broncos draft
Round	Pick	Player	Position	College	Notes
4	121	Jamie Brown	OT	Florida A&M	
4	124	Ken Brown	LB	Virginia Tech	
5	146	Phil Yeboah-Kodie	LB	Penn State	
6	182	Fritz Fequeire	G	Iowa	
6	196	Terrell Davis * ^{†}	RB	Georgia	
7	218	Steve Russ	LB	Air Force	
7	222	Byron Chamberlain *	Wide receiver	Wayne State (NE)	
Made roster † Pro Football Hall of Fame * Made at least one Pro Bowl during career

== Personnel ==
=== Staff / Coaches ===
1995 Denver Broncos staff
Front office: President and chief executive officer – Pat Bowlen; General manager – John Beake; Director of player personnel – Bob Ferguson; Director of college scouting – Jerry Frei; Director of pro scouting – Jack Elway; Administrative assistant/player personnel – Harold Richardson; College Scout – Dave Gettleman; College Scout – Ted Sundquist; Head coaches: Head coach – Mike Shanahan; Assistant head coach/offensive line – Alex Gibbs; Offensive coaches: Offensive coordinator/quarterbacks – Gary Kubiak; Running backs – Bobby Turner; Wide receivers – Mike Heimerdinger; Tight ends – Brian Pariani; Assistant offensive line/Assistant Strength and Conditioning – Barney Chavous; Offensive assistant – Rick Dennison	Defensive coaches: Defensive coordinator – Greg Robinson; Defensive line – George Dyer; Linebackers – Frank Bush; Defensive backs – Ed Donatell; Defensive assistant/Assistant defensive backs – Alvin Reynolds; Special teams coaches: Special teams – Richard Smith; Strength and conditioning: Strength and conditioning – Rich Tuten; Administrative Assistant/Strength and Conditioning – Greg Saporta

=== Final roster ===
1995 Denver Broncos roster
Quarterbacks (QB): 7 John Elway; 17 Hugh Millen; 14 Bill Musgrave; Running backs (RB): 29 Aaron Craver FB; 30 Terrell Davis; 45 Gary Downs FB; 22 Glyn Milburn; 38 Reggie Rivers FB; Wide receivers (WR): 82 Vance Johnson; 87 Ed McCaffrey; 83 Anthony Miller; 81 Mike Pritchard; 80 Rod Smith; Tight ends (TE): 89 Dwayne Carswell; 86 Byron Chamberlain; 84 Shannon Sharpe; 85 Jeff Wilner	Offensive linemen (OL): 61 Eric Floyd G; 75 Brian Habib G; 68 Reggie McElroy T/G; 66 Tom Nalen C; 69 Mark Schlereth G; 74 Bill Schultz T; 64 Ralph Tamm C; 76 Broderick Thompson T; 65 Gary Zimmerman T; Defensive linemen (DL): 99 Shane Dronett DT; 73 Simon Fletcher DE; 96 Harald Hasselbach DE; 78 Larry Jackson DE; 93 James Jones DT; 97 Mike Lodish DT; 95 Michael Dean Perry DT; 94 Jeff Robinson; 98 Maa Tanuvasa DT	Linebackers (LB): 57 Allen Aldridge OLB; 55 Ken Brown OLB; 56 Keith Burns MLB; 59 Glenn Cadrez OLB; 54 Britt Hager OLB; 50 Ray Jacobs OLB; 92 Dave Wyman MLB; Defensive backs (DB): 27 Steve Atwater FS; 34 Tyrone Braxton SS; 39 Ray Crockett CB; 37 Tim Hauck FS; 28 Cliff Hicks CB; 21 Randy Hilliard CB; 31 Rondell Jones SS; 26 Eric Thomas CB; 48 Lionel Washington CB; Special teams (ST): 1 Jason Elam K; 16 Tom Rouen P	Practice squad: 46 Bryce Burnett TE; 63 David Diaz-Infante G/C; 24 Jamal Ellis CB; 52 Shane Jasper LB; Reserve: 58 Elijah Alexander LB (IR); 23 Ronnie Bradford CB (IR); 70 Jamie Brown T (IR); 88 Jerry Evans TE (IR); 91 Willie Oshodin DE (IR); -- Steve Russ LB (Military); 90 Dan Williams DE (IR); Rookies in italics 53 active, 6 reserve, 4 practice squad

== Regular season ==
=== Schedule ===
Week	Date	Opponent	Result	Record	Venue	Attendance
1	September 3	Buffalo Bills	**W** 22–7	1–0	Mile High Stadium	75,743
2	September 10	at Dallas Cowboys	**L** 21–31	1–1	Texas Stadium	64,576
3	September 17	Washington Redskins	**W** 38–31	2–1	Mile High Stadium	71,930
4	September 24	at **San Diego Chargers**	**L** 6–17	2–2	Jack Murphy Stadium	58,978
5	October 1,	at **Seattle Seahawks**	**L** 10–27	2–3	Kingdome	56,483
6	October 8	at New England Patriots	**W** 37–3	3–3	Foxboro Stadium	60,074
7	October 16	**Oakland Raiders**	**W** 27–0	4–3	Mile High Stadium	75,491
8	October 22	**Kansas City Chiefs**	**L** 7–21	4–4	Mile High Stadium	71,044
9	Bye					
10	November 5	Arizona Cardinals	**W** 38–6	5–4	Mile High Stadium	71,488
11	November 12	at Philadelphia Eagles	**L** 13–31	5–5	Veterans Stadium	60,842
12	November 19	**San Diego Chargers**	**W** 30–27	6–5	Mile High Stadium	74,681
13	November 26	at Houston Oilers	**L** 33–42	6–6	Astrodome	36,113
14	December 3	Jacksonville Jaguars	**W** 31–23	7–6	Mile High Stadium	72,231
15	December 10	**Seattle Seahawks**	**L** 27–31	7–7	Mile High Stadium	71,488
16	December 17	at **Kansas City Chiefs**	**L** 17–20	7–8	Arrowhead Stadium	75,061
17	December 24	at **Oakland Raiders**	**W** 31–28	8–8	Oakland–Alameda County Coliseum	50,074
Note: Intra-division opponents are in **bold** text.

=== Standings ===
AFC West
	W	L	T	PCT	PF	PA	STK
^{(1)} Kansas City Chiefs	13	3	0	.813	358	241	W2
^{(4)} San Diego Chargers	9	7	0	.563	321	323	W5
Seattle Seahawks	8	8	0	.500	363	366	L1
Denver Broncos	8	8	0	.500	388	345	W1
Oakland Raiders	8	8	0	.500	348	332	L6

== Season summary ==
=== Week 1 vs Bills ===
Week One: Buffalo Bills (0–0) at Denver Broncos (0–0)

Quarter	1	2	3	4	Total
Bills	7	0	0	0	7
Broncos	3	9	0	10	22

at Mile High Stadium, Denver, Colorado

- Date: September 3, 1995
- Game time: 8:00 p.m. EDT
- Game weather: Clear, 76 °F (24 °C)
- Game attendance: 75,157
- TV announcers (TNT): Verne Lundquist, Pat Haden, and Craig Sager
- Box Score, Box Score

Game information

First quarter

- DEN – Jason Elam 22-yard field goal, 12:32. Broncos 3–0. Drive: 5 plays, 51 yards.
- BUF – Andre Reed 34-yard pass from Jim Kelly (Steve Christie kick), 8:43. Bills 7–3. Drive: 7 plays, 70 yards.

Second quarter

- DEN – Jason Elam 52-yard field goal, 14:55. Bills 7–6. Drive: 5 plays, 19 yards.
- DEN – Jason Elam 20-yard field goal, 8:25. Broncos 9–7. Drive: 10 plays, 42 yards.
- DEN – Jason Elam 38-yard field goal, 0:02. Broncos 12–7. Drive: 10 plays, 54 yards.

Third quarter

- No scoring

Fourth quarter

- DEN – Jason Elam 37-yard field goal, 10:23. Broncos 15–7. Drive: 11 plays, 59 yards.
- DEN – Terrell Davis 3-yard run (Jason Elam kick), 3:22. Broncos 22–7. Drive: 9 plays, 84 yards.

Top passers

- BUF – Jim Kelly – 12/28, 154 yards, TD
- DEN – John Elway – 22/41, 317 yards, INT

Top rushers

- BUF – Thurman Thomas – 17 rushes, 46 yards
- DEN – Terrell Davis – 20 rushes, 70 yards, TD

Top receivers

- BUF – Russell Copeland – 6 receptions, 75 yards
- DEN – Shannon Sharpe – 10 receptions, 180 yards

This game was the Bills’ first game in Denver since 1977.
