= David H. Glass =

American politician

Member of the Mississippi House of Representatives from the Attala County district
- In office January 1956 – January 1960
- In office January 1940 – January 1948
- In office January 1920 – January 1936

Personal details
- Born: August 8, 1887 Sallis, Mississippi
- Died: May 1979 (aged 91)
- Party: Democrat

David Henry Glass (August 8, 1887 - May 1979) was a longtime Democratic member of the Mississippi House of Representatives from Attala County.

== Biography ==
David Henry Glass was born on August 8, 1887, in Sallis, Mississippi. His father Henry Clay Glass was from Texas. He was a lawyer, farmer, and timber grower. He fought in and was a veteran of World War I. He was a Democratic member of the Mississippi House of Representatives for a total of 28 years, representing Attala County, from 1920 to 1936, from 1940 to 1948, and from 1956 to 1960. While living in Kosciusko, he died in May 1979.
