= Icey W. Day =

American politician

Member of the Mississippi House of Representatives from the Attala County district
- In office January 1944 – January 1952
- In office January 1932 – January 1940
- In office January 1916 – January 1920

Personal details
- Born: July 1, 1891 Ethel, Mississippi
- Died: December 21, 1955 (aged 64) Jackson, Mississippi
- Party: Democrat
- Children: 2

Icey Wiley Day (July 1, 1891 - December 21, 1955) was a longtime Democratic member of the Mississippi House of Representatives, representing Attala County. He was blind.

== Early life ==
Icey Wiley Day was born on July 1, 1891, in Ethel, Attala County, Mississippi. His parents were John Vandiver Day and Anne Elizabeth (Wilson) Day. He was blinded at the age of 10 while playing baseball in Ethel. At the age of 13, he entered the State Institution for the Blind in Jackson, Mississippi, and remained there until he was 19. He then entered the University of Mississippi, where he received his L.L.B. in 1913. He was admitted to the bar the same year.

== Political career and death ==
Day was elected to the Mississippi House of Representatives, representing his native Attala County as a Democrat, for the first time in 1915. In 1919, he ran for the office of Mississippi Railroad Commissioner, but lost in the Mississippi 1st Supreme Court District primary election to George R. Edwards. He was elected again for, and served, the terms of 1932–1936, 1936–1940, 1944–1948, and 1948–1952. He was also elected in 1955, but died of a heart attack on December 21, 1955, before taking office, which would have been on January 3 of 1956. During his tenure, he founded the Mississippi Industries for the Blind.

== Personal life ==
Day was a member of the Baptist Church. He married Gladys Allen in 1927, and they had 2 children together. Day was the first blind man in the Masons of Mississippi.
