= 1993 Denver Broncos season =

American football team season

- Owner: Pat Bowlen
- General manager: John Beake
- Head coach: Wade Phillips
- Offensive coordinator: Jim Fassel
- Defensive coordinator: Charlie Waters
- Home stadium: Mile High Stadium

Results
- Record: 9–7
- Division place: 3rd AFC West
- Playoffs: Lost Wild Card Playoffs (at Raiders) 24–42

Uniform
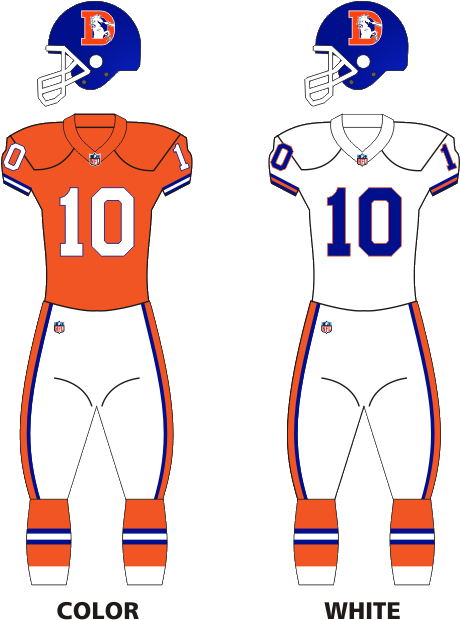

The 1993 Denver Broncos season was the team's 34th year in professional football and its 24th with the National Football League.

1993 was the first year for new head coach Wade Phillips, who had been the team's defensive coordinator since 1989. John Elway was the quarterback for the Denver Broncos in which he passed for 4,030 yards. This team also had two hall of fame players in Shannon Sharpe and Steve Atwater. Their season finished in an AFC Wild Card Playoff loss against the Los Angeles Raiders by the score of 42–24.

== Offseason ==
After the 1992 season, Broncos owner Pat Bowlen fired head coach Dan Reeves, who had helmed the franchise for 12 years. The team promoted defensive coordinator Wade Phillips son of former Oilers and Saints coach Bum Phillips to head coach.

=== NFL draft ===
1993 Denver Broncos draft
Round	Pick	Player	Position	College	Notes
1	11	Dan Williams	Defensive end	Toledo	from Cleveland
2	43	Glyn Milburn *	Running back	Stanford	
3	69	Rondell Jones	Safety	North Carolina	
3	70	Jason Elam *	Kicker	Hawaii	
4	98	Jeff Robinson	Defensive end	Idaho	
5	126	Kevin Williams	Running back	UCLA	
6	154	Melvin Bonner	Wide receiver	Baylor	
7	169	Clarence Williams	Tight end	Washington State	
7	182	Tony Kimbrough	Wide receiver	Jackson State	
8	210	Brian Stablein	Wide receiver	Ohio State	
Made roster * Made at least one Pro Bowl during career

== Personnel ==
=== Staff / Coaches ===
1993 Denver Broncos staff
Front office: President and Chief Executive Officer – Pat Bowlen; General Manager – John Beake; Director of Football Operations/Player Personnel – Bob Ferguson; Assistant Director of Player Personnel – Ronnie Hill; Director of College Scouting – Jeff Smith; College Scout – Cornell Green; Pro Scout – Jack Elway; Pro Scout – Jerry Frei; Player Personnel Assistant – Ted Sundquist; Head coaches: Head Coach – Wade Phillips; Special Assistant to Head Coach/Offense – Harold Richardson; Offensive coaches: Offensive Coordinator/Quarterbacks – Jim Fassel; Running Backs – Bishop Harris; Wide Receivers – Mo Forte; Tight Ends – Les Steckel; Offensive Line – John Levra	Defensive coaches: Defensive Coordinator/Defensive Backs – Charlie Waters; Defensive Line – Ernie Stautner; Linebackers – John Paul Young; Assistant Defensive Backs/Quality Control – Alvin Reynolds; Special teams coaches: Special Teams/Linebackers – Richard Smith; Strength and conditioning: Strength/Conditioning – Vernon Banks; Assistant Strength/Conditioning and Assistant Defensive Line – Barney Chavous

=== Final roster ===
1993 Denver Broncos roster
Quarterbacks (QB): 7 John Elway; 8 Tommy Maddox; 12 Shawn Moore; Running backs (RB): 39 Robert Delpino KR; 37 Anthony Lynn; 22 Glyn Milburn; 38 Reggie Rivers; Wide receivers (WR): 83 Melvin Bonner; 80 Tony Kimbrough; 86 Arthur Marshall; 81 Barry Rose; 85 Derek Russell KR; 42 Kitrick Taylor; 87 Cedric Tillman; Tight ends (TE): 88 Jerry Evans; 89 Reggie Johnson; 84 Shannon Sharpe	Offensive linemen (OL): 68 Russell Freeman T; 75 Brian Habib G; 72 Keith Kartz C; 78 Don Maggs T; 61 Bob Meeks C; 64 Jon Melander G; 76 Kirk Scrafford T; 79 Dave Widell; 65 Gary Zimmerman T; Defensive linemen (DL): 99 Shane Dronett DE; 97 Darren Drozdov NT; 71 Greg Kragen NT; 91 Willie Oshodin DE; 94 Jeff Robinson DE; 95 Alphonso Taylor NT; 90 Dan Williams DE	Linebackers (LB): 58 Elijah Alexander ILB; 51 Mike Croel OLB; 54 Mitch Donahue OLB; 73 Simon Fletcher OLB; 59 Tim Lucas OLB; 77 Karl Mecklenburg ILB; 52 Jeff Mills OLB; 57 Dave Wyman ILB; Defensive backs (DB): 27 Steve Atwater FS; 23 Ronnie Bradford CB; 34 Tyrone Braxton CB; 29 Charles Dimry CB; 40 Darryl Hall SS; 31 Rondell Jones FS; 21 Le-Lo Lang CB; 47 David Pool CB; 36 Frank Robinson CB; 49 Dennis Smith SS; Special teams (ST): 1 Jason Elam K; 16 Tom Rouen P	Practice squad: 74 Olaf Hampel T; -- Greg Primus WR; Reserve: 33 Rod Bernstine RB (IR); 82 Vance Johnson WR (IR); Rookies in italics 53 active, 2 reserve, 2 practice squad

== Regular season ==
=== Schedule ===
Week	Date	Opponent	Result	Record	Venue	Attendance
1	September 5	at New York Jets	**W** 26–20	1–0	Giants Stadium	68,130
2	September 12	**San Diego Chargers**	**W** 34–17	2–0	Mile High Stadium	75,074
3	September 20	at **Kansas City Chiefs**	**L** 7–15	2–1	Arrowhead Stadium	78,453
4	Bye					
5	October 3	Indianapolis Colts	**W** 35–13	3–1	Mile High Stadium	74,953
6	October 10	at Green Bay Packers	**L** 27–30	3–2	Lambeau Field	58,943
7	October 18	**Los Angeles Raiders**	**L** 20–23	3–3	Mile High Stadium	75,712
8	Bye					
9	October 31	**Seattle Seahawks**	**W** 28–17	4–3	Mile High Stadium	73,644
10	November 7	at Cleveland Browns	**W** 29–14	5–3	Cleveland Municipal Stadium	77,818
11	November 14	Minnesota Vikings	**L** 23–26	5–4	Mile High Stadium	67,329
12	November 21	Pittsburgh Steelers	**W** 37–13	6–4	Mile High Stadium	74,840
13	November 28	at **Seattle Seahawks**	**W** 17–9	7–4	Kingdome	57,812
14	December 5	at **San Diego Chargers**	**L** 10–13	7–5	Jack Murphy Stadium	60,233
15	December 12	**Kansas City Chiefs**	**W** 27–21	8–5	Mile High Stadium	75,822
16	December 18	at Chicago Bears	**W** 13–3	9–5	Soldier Field	53,056
17	December 26	Tampa Bay Buccaneers	**L** 10–17	9–6	Mile High Stadium	73,434
18	January 2, 1994	at **Los Angeles Raiders**	**L** 30–33 (OT)	9–7	Los Angeles Memorial Coliseum	66,904
Note: Intra-division opponents are in **bold** text.

== Season summary ==
=== Week 1 ===
Team	1	2	3	4	Total
• Broncos	6	7	13	0	26
Jets	0	6	0	14	20

- Date: September 5
- Location: Giants Stadium
- Game start: 1:00 p.m. EST
- Game attendance: 68,130
- Game weather: 76 °F (24 °C); wind 7 mph (11 km/h)

Scoring summary
Q1	DEN	Elam 28 yard field goal	DEN 3–0
Q1	DEN	Elam 30 yard field goal	DEN 6–0
Q2	NYJ	Blanchard 22 yard field goal	DEN 6–3
Q2	NYJ	Blanchard 43 yard field goal	Tie 6–6
Q2	DEN	Tillman 3 yard pass from Elway (Elam kick)	DEN 13–6
Q3	DEN	Milburn 25 yard pass from Elway (Elam kick)	DEN 20–6
Q3	DEN	Elam 30 yard field goal	DEN 23–6
Q3	DEN	Elam 41 yard field goal	DEN 26–6
Q4	NYJ	Mitchell 5 yard pass from Esiason (Blanchard kick)	DEN 26–13
Q4	NYJ	Moore 6 yard pass from Esiason (Blanchard kick)	DEN 26–20

== Standings ==
AFC West
	W	L	T	PCT	PF	PA	STK
^{(3)} Kansas City Chiefs	11	5	0	.688	328	291	W1
^{(4)} Los Angeles Raiders	10	6	0	.625	306	326	W1
^{(5)} Denver Broncos	9	7	0	.563	373	284	L2
San Diego Chargers	8	8	0	.500	322	290	W2
Seattle Seahawks	6	10	0	.375	280	314	L1

== Postseason ==
Round	Date	Opponent	Result	Record	Venue	Game recap
Wild Card	January 9, 1994	at Los Angeles Raiders (4)	L 24–42	0–1	Los Angeles Memorial Coliseum	Recap

== Awards and records ==
- John Elway, franchise record, most passing yards in one season, 4,030 Yards
