= Thomastown, Mississippi =

- Unincorporated community
- Location within Mississippi Location within the United States
- Coordinates: 32°51′50″N 89°40′10″W
- Country: United States
- State: Mississippi
- County: Leake
- Elevation: 410 ft (120 m)
- Time zone: UTC-6 (Central (CST))
  - Summer (DST): UTC-5 (CDT)
- ZIP code: 39171
- Area codes: 601 & 769
- GNIS feature ID: 678685

Thomastown is an unincorporated community in Leake County, Mississippi, United States. The junction of Mississippi Highway 43 and Mississippi Highway 429 was placed at Thomastown, some 11.9 miles (19.2 km) northwest of Carthage.

== History ==
Thomastown was incorporated in 1854 and disincorporated at an unknown date.

The community is located on the Yockanookany River and in 1900 had a population of 54.

Thomastown has a post office with ZIP code 39171, which opened on May 17, 1933.

Thomastown was once home to a masonic lodge, Thomastown Lodge No. 124.
