= Attala County School District =

School district in Mississippi

Address
- 100 Courthouse Building Suite 3 Kosciusko, MS 39090 Attala County, Mississippi; United States

District information
- Established: 1870; 156 years ago

Other information
- Website: https://www.attala.k12.ms.us/

The Attala County School District is a public school district based in Attala County, Mississippi (USA).

The district serves the towns of Ethel, Sallis, McCool, and the community of McAdams.

== Schools ==
- Ethel High School (Ethel; Grades 7-12)
- McAdams High School (McAdams; Grades 7-12)
- Greenlee Elementary (McCool; Grades PK-6)
- Long Creek Elementary (Sallis; Grades PK-6)

== Demographics ==
=== 2006-07 school year ===
There were a total of 1,287 students enrolled in the Attala County School District during the 2006–2007 school year. The gender makeup of the district was about 48% female and 52% male. The racial makeup of the district was 64.49% African American, 35.28% White, and 0.23% Hispanic. 65.9% of the district's students were eligible to receive free lunch.

=== Previous school years ===
School Year	Enrollment	Gender Makeup		Racial Makeup				
School Year	Enrollment	Female	Male	Asian	African American	Hispanic	Native American	White
2005-06	1,369	48%	52%	0.07%	65.30%	0.22%	–	34.40%
2004-05	1,320	49%	51%	0.38%	66.21%	0.15%	–	33.26%
2003-04	1,300	49%	51%	0.08%	66.15%	0.15%	0.23%	33.38%
2002-03	1,343	49%	51%	–	68.50%	–	–	31.50%

== Accountability statistics ==
	2006-07	2005-06	2004-05	2003-04	2002-03
District Accreditation Status	Accredited	Accredited	Accredited	Accredited	Accredited
School Performance Classifications
Level 5 (Superior Performing) Schools	0	0	0	0	0
Level 4 (Exemplary) Schools	0	0	1	1	1
Level 3 (Successful) Schools	3	4	2	3	3
Level 2 (Under Performing) Schools	1	0	1	0	0
Level 1 (Low Performing) Schools	0	0	0	0	0
Not Assigned	0	0	0	0	0

== See also ==
- List of school districts in Mississippi
