= Leroy Percy State Park =

State park in Mississippi, United States

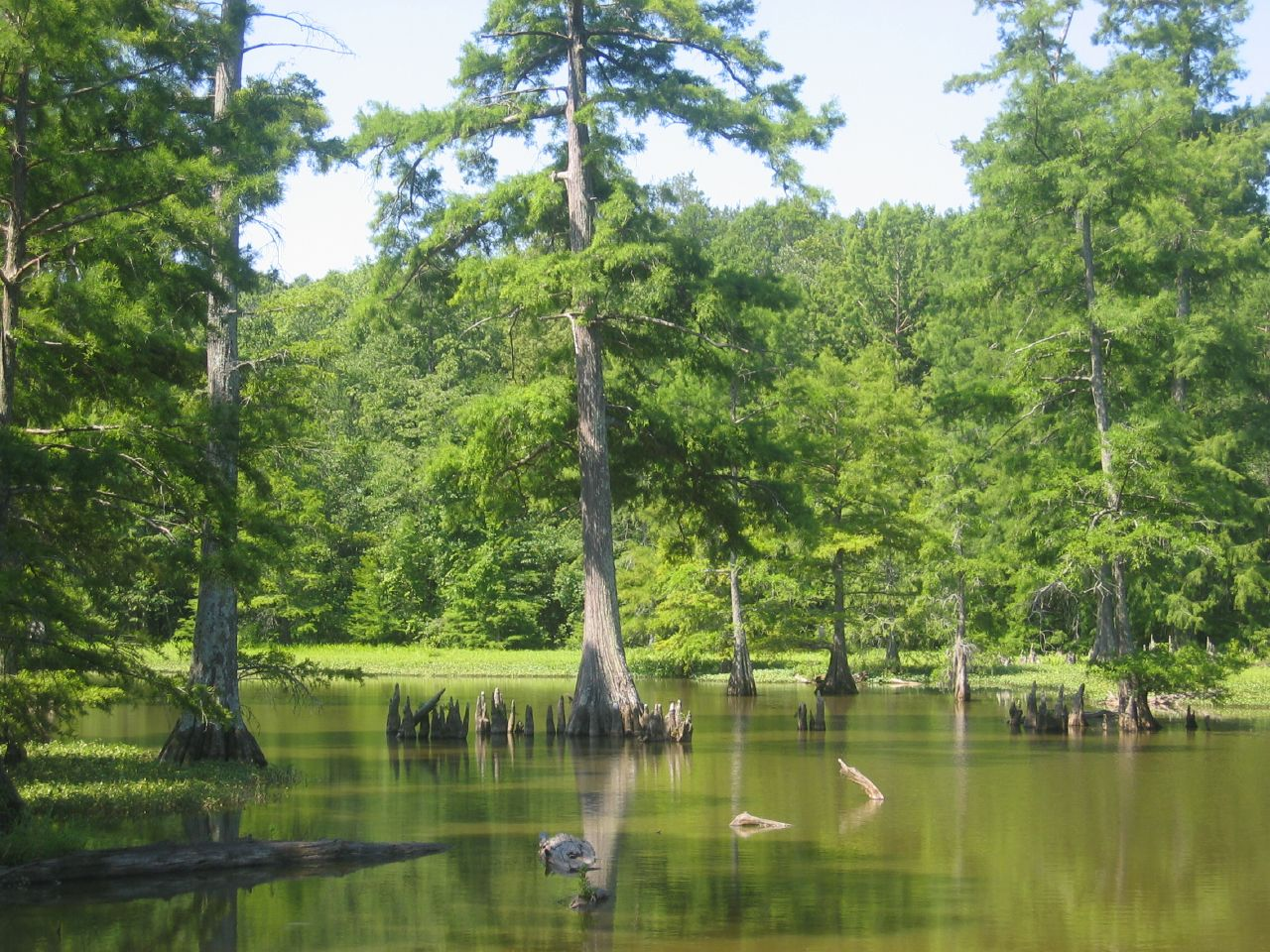

- Location within Mississippi
- Location: Washington County, Mississippi, United States
- Coordinates: 33°10′03″N 90°56′09″W
- Elevation: 108 ft (33 m)
- Established: 1934
- Administrator: Mississippi Department of Wildlife, Fisheries, and Parks
- Designation: Mississippi state park
- Named for: Senator Leroy Percy
- Website: Official website

Leroy Percy State Park is a public recreation area located off Mississippi Highway 12, five miles (8.0 km) west of Hollandale, Mississippi. The state park's impressive natural beauty features cypress trees, artesian springs, and ancient oaks.

== History ==
It is the state's oldest state park, its construction having begun with the arrival of the Civilian Conservation Corps in 1934. It is named after LeRoy Percy, a former U.S. Senator from Mississippi.

== Activities and amenities ==
The park features boating and fishing on Alligator Lake, hunting, primitive and developed campsites, eight cabins, a nature trail, picnic areas, and a disc golf course. Alligators can be viewed in the lake. Visitors can pay for a day pass or an overnight campground pass.
