= Willie Oshodin =

Nigerian football player (born 1969)

No. 91
- Position: Defensive end

Personal information
- Born: September 16, 1969 (age 57); Benin City, Nigeria
- Listed height: 6 ft 4 in (1.93 m)
- Listed weight: 265 lb (120 kg)

Career information
- High school: North Bethesda (MD) Georgetown Prep
- College: Villanova
- NFL draft: 1992: undrafted

Career history
- Denver Broncos (1992–1995)

Career NFL statistics
- Tackles: 38
- Sacks: 1
- Forced fumbles: 1
- Stats at Pro Football Reference

Willie Oshodin (born September 16, 1969) is a former American football defensive end. He played for the Denver Broncos from 1993 to 1995.
