= Bradley, Mississippi =

- Unincorporated community
- Location within Mississippi Location within the United States
- Coordinates: 33°22′28″N 88°58′48″W
- Country: United States
- State: Mississippi
- County: Oktibbeha
- Elevation: 325 ft (99 m)
- Time zone: UTC-6 (Central (CST))
  - Summer (DST): UTC-5 (CDT)
- ZIP code: 39759
- Area code: 662
- GNIS feature ID: 692683

Bradley is an unincorporated community located on Mississippi Highway 12 in Oktibbeha County, Mississippi. Bradley is approximately 11 miles (18 km) southwest of Starkville and approximately 8 miles (13 km) northeast of Sturgis.

Bradley is located on the Kansas City Southern Railway and in 1911 was home to three general stores. The community also had multiple cotton gins.

A post office operated under the name Bradley from 1876 to 1947.
