= John D. Winters =

American historian

- Born: John David Winters; December 23, 1916; McCool, Mississippi, U.S.
- Died: December 9, 1997 (aged 80); Ruston, Louisiana, U.S.
- Education: Louisiana State University
- Occupations: Historian; Professor at Louisiana Tech University,
- Years active: 1948-1984
- Spouse: Frances Locke Winters (married 1952-his death)
- Children: No children
- Parent(s): John D. Winters, Sr. Estrella Fancher Winters

John David Winters (December 23, 1916 – December 9, 1997) was an American historian at Louisiana Tech University in Ruston, Louisiana. He is known for his monograph The Civil War in Louisiana, which was published in 1963, released in paperback in 1991, and is still in print. When published, it was the first and only single volume history covering events in Louisiana from 1861 to 1865.

== Background ==
Winters was born to John David Winters Sr. (1891–1944), and the former Estrella Fancher (1890–1958) in rural McCool in Attala County in central Mississippi. His family moved and he was reared in Lake Providence, the seat of East Carroll Parish in northeastern Louisiana. His parents are interred at Lake Providence Cemetery.

He earned the Bachelor of Arts, Master of Arts, and Doctor of Philosophy degrees from Louisiana State University in Baton Rouge. During World War II, Winters served in the Pacific Theatre, but his obituary does not list the branch of service.

=== Marriage and family ===
On January 26, 1952, Winters wed Frances Locke (1921–2006) in her native Ashdown in Little River County in southwestern Arkansas. They had met at Louisiana Tech, where she served as acquisitions librarian from 1948 to 1984. They had no children.

== Academic career ==
Winters, who did not use the designation "Jr.," was professor of history at Louisiana Tech from 1948 until his retirement in 1984.

== The Civil War in Louisiana ==
Sponsored by a state commission as part of observance of the centennial of the American Civil War, Winters produced the first history and only single volume about the war in Louisiana, from 1861 to 1865. He was among historians who believed that the war in the west had been overlooked. Winters organized his history by year, covering the progress of the war in actions across the state. He provided extensive details about a range of battles and skirmishes, and guerrilla actions, as well as assessing the influence of these engagements on the overall American Civil War and the people in Louisiana. The loss of control of New Orleans in 1862 to Union forces was particularly significant. He also explored politics, economics, and social issues.

In his preface to the book, Winters acknowledged the role of his wife, who served as the Louisiana Tech acquisitions librarian from 1948 to 1984. She helped conduct the years of extensive research in various historical records and helped write this book. In his preface to the book, Winters acknowledges his wife's assistance and also the contributions of two historians who guided him in the process, former Louisiana Tech president F. Jay Taylor, who read the manuscript, and the LSU historian T. Harry Williams, who wrote the foreword.

== Reception ==
Winters' book was highly praised in the region when first published. The book won the 1963 Louisiana Literary Award presented by the Louisiana Library Association and the 1964 "Special Merit Book Award" from the Greater Louisiana Tech Foundation.

But a reviewer for the Journal of American History suggested that perhaps Winters had tried to take on too much in one volume, and might have been more successful in treating the broad range of topics in a multi-volume work. The reviewer criticized his organization by chronology, saying that it might be difficult for some readers to follow because he had included so many details of minor campaigns, but praised the overall effort in such a large study. The reviewer noted that he did not appear to consult the journal Civil War History, nor a variety of repositories of primary source material in the state.

Winters' work has been criticized for reflecting white racial bias toward slaves of historians of the early 20th century, particularly followers of the Dunning School. In a review of historiography of the war and historians' treatment of blacks in the South, Clarence L. Mohr of the University of Georgia wrote in 1974 of The Civil War in Louisiana that Winters treated blacks "in a more insensitive manner than many earlier studies." While he approves of Winters integrating black history into the rest of his work, unlike historians who treated them separately, Mohr writes:

Winters' discussions, however, are characterized by frequent mentions of the 'Negro problem,' allusions to sexual indiscretions by 'colored wenches' and attempts by Union soldiers to 'lure' slaves away from their masters ... The author's perspective is further revealed in his description of black conduct in areas occupied and later evacuated by Federal troops during General Nathaniel P. Banks' Red River expedition in 1863. 'Some [Negroes]' writes Winters, 'refused to work and were shot; some were soundly thrashed; and all of them began to act better.'

The role of free men of color in the South, in addition to the larger number of slaves, has been of increasing interest to historians. Winters estimated that three thousand free men of color volunteered for militia duty in Louisiana by 1862, but historian Arthur W. Bergeron disputes this number as too high in his "Louisiana's Free Men of Color in Gray" in Louisianians in the Civil War (2002). He estimates that no more than two thousand free men of color participated in Louisiana militias, with the first units of Native Guards formed in New Orleans. He documents fifteen free men of color as having joined the Confederate Army as privates, and suggests that a small number of others saw combat. Three noted volunteer free men of color came from St. Landry Parish: Charles F. Lutz, who fought in Virginia (likely having passed as white), was taken prisoner, and in 1900 finally gained a Confederate pension; Jean Baptiste Pierre-Auguste, who fought with Confederates at Vicksburg, Mississippi; and Lufroy Pierre-Auguste.

== Academic career ==
From 1977 until his retirement in 1984, Winters was the first recipient and holder of the Garnie W. McGinty Chair of History, named for the former Louisiana Tech history department chairman. In 1991, Winters was named Louisiana Tech professor emeritus.

== Publications ==
- Winters, "The Ouachita-Black", in The Rivers and Bayous of Louisiana, ed. by Edwin A. Davis, Baton Rouge, Louisiana: Louisiana Education Research Association, 1968
- Winters and Danelle Bradford, "Seventy-Eight Years of Football at Louisiana Tech" in the North Louisiana Historical Association Journal (1980), since renamed North Louisiana History.
- Winters, "Secession and Civil War in North Louisiana", in North Louisiana, ed. by B.H. Gilley, Ruston, Louisiana: McGinty Trust Fund Publications, 1984

== Post-retirement ==
In 1994, Winters participated in an interview for the Centennial Oral History Collection at Louisiana Tech. In this hour-long conversation, he discusses varied experiences on the campus, the effects of desegregation in the 1960s, the influence of the Korean and Vietnam Wars, and his participation in the Louisiana Tech-Rome studies program.

== Professional and civic activities ==
In 1968, Winters was elected president of the Louisiana Historical Association, now based in Lafayette. He was named a fellow by the association in 1993. He was also active in other historical societies.

Winters served on the board of directors for the Ruston Community Theatre and the Louisiana Tech Concert Association. He was a past president of the Ruston Civic Symphony.

== Honors ==
- 1963 Louisiana Literary Award presented by the Louisiana Library Association, for his history of the Civil War in Louisiana
- 1964 "Special Merit Book Award" from the Greater Louisiana Tech Foundation, for the same history
- 1975 - award from the Daughters of the American Revolution
- 1980 - award from Amoco Oil Company, for excellence in undergraduate education.
- Louisiana Tech named an "Endowed Professorship in History" after Winters.

== Death ==
Winters died at Lincoln General Hospital in Ruston, Louisiana at the age of eighty. He was survived by his wife Frances and two sisters-in-law, Doris M. Winters (1917–2004) of Lake Providence and Elizabeth Winters of Garland, Texas. He was predeceased by two brothers, Henry F. Winters (1915–1987), who was married to Doris; and John. Winters's memorial service was held on December 11, 1997, at Trinity United Methodist Church in Ruston. His widow Frances died about eight years after he did. The two were each cremated.

| Preceded by Leonard V. Huber | President of the Louisiana Historical Association; 1968–1969 | Succeeded by Henry W. Morris |
