= McAdams, Mississippi =

- Unincorporated community
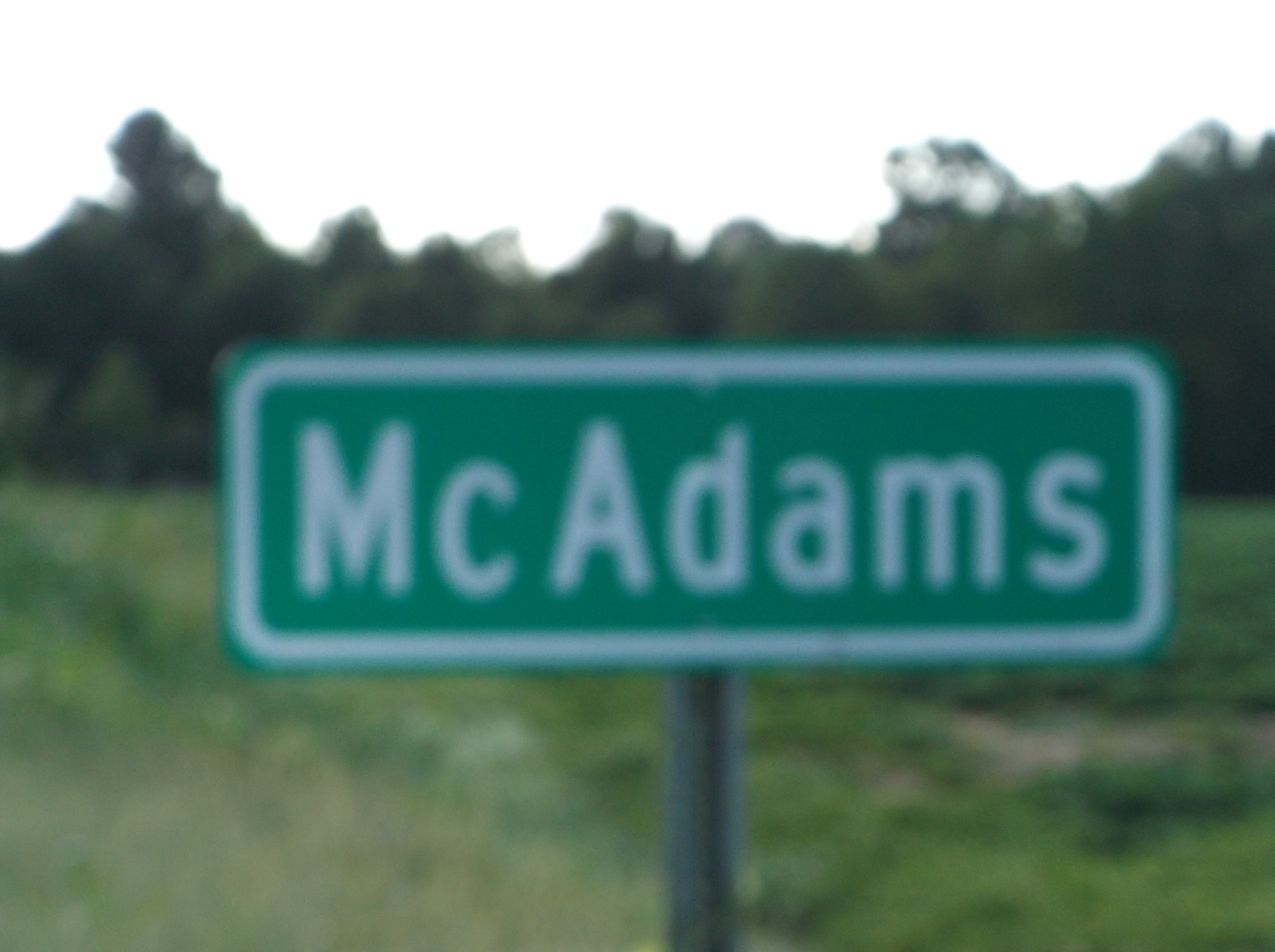
- Highway sign in McAdams located on Mississippi Highway 12

- Location within Mississippi Location within the United States
- Coordinates: 33°01′16″N 89°41′18″W
- Country: United States
- State: Mississippi
- County: Attala
- Elevation: 312 ft (95 m)
- Time zone: UTC-6 (Central (CST))
  - Summer (DST): UTC-5 (CDT)
- ZIP code: 39107
- Area code: 662
- GNIS feature ID: 673282

McAdams is an unincorporated community in Attala County, Mississippi, United States. McAdams is located on Mississippi Highway 12 and is approximately 4 miles (6.4 km) east of Sallis and approximately 6 miles (9.7 km) west of Kosciusko.

McAdams is located on a branch of the former Illinois Central Railroad. At one point, McAdams was home to a general store, cotton gin, and saw mill. A post office began operation under the name McAdams in 1891.

== Notable resident ==
- Billy Ray Bates, professional basketball player.
