= Bolatusha, Mississippi =

- Unincorporated community
- Location within Mississippi Location within the United States
- Coordinates: 32°55′22″N 89°42′08″W
- Country: United States
- State: Mississippi
- County: Leake
- Elevation: 371 ft (113 m)
- Time zone: UTC-6 (Central (CST))
  - Summer (DST): UTC-5 (CDT)
- Area codes: 601 & 769
- GNIS feature ID: 691717

Bolatusha is an unincorporated community in Leake County, in the U.S. state of Mississippi.

== History ==
The community takes its name from Bolatusha Creek, which flows near the site. A post office called Bolatusha was established in 1894, and remained in operation until 1940. In 1900, Bolatusha had a population of 24.
