= Jamie Brown (American football) =

American football player (born 1972)

No. 70, 72, 73
- Position: Offensive tackle

Personal information
- Born: April 24, 1972 (age 54); Miami, Florida, U.S.
- Listed height: 6 ft 8 in (2.03 m)
- Listed weight: 318 lb (144 kg)

Career information
- High school: Miami Killian (Kendall, Florida)
- College: Florida A&M
- NFL draft: 1995: 4th round, 121st overall pick

Career history
- Denver Broncos (1995–1997); San Francisco 49ers (1998); Washington Redskins (1999)

Awards and highlights
- Super Bowl champion (XXXII)

Career NFL statistics
- Games played: 38
- Games started: 9
- Stats at Pro Football Reference

Jamie Shepard Brown II (born April 24, 1972) is an American former professional football player who was an offensive tackle in the National Football League (NFL) for the Denver Broncos, San Francisco 49ers, and Washington Redskins. Brown won Super Bowl XXXII with the 1997 Broncos over the Green Bay Packers. He played college football for the Florida A&M Rattlers and was selected in the fourth round of the 1995 NFL draft.
