= Ken Brown (linebacker) =

German gridiron football player (born 1971)

No. 55
- Position: Linebacker

Personal information
- Born: May 5, 1971 (age 55); Wiesbaden, West Germany
- Listed height: 6 ft 1 in (1.85 m)
- Listed weight: 235 lb (107 kg)

Career information
- High school: Monacan (Richmond, Virginia, U.S.)
- College: Virginia Tech (1991–1994)
- NFL draft: 1995: 4th round, 124th overall pick

Career history
- Denver Broncos (1995)
- Stats at Pro Football Reference

Kenneth Anderson Brown (born May 5, 1971) is an American former professional football linebacker who played one season with the Denver Broncos of the National Football League (NFL). He was selected by the Broncos in the fourth round of the 1995 NFL draft after playing college football at Virginia Tech.

== Early life and college ==
Kenneth Anderson Brown was born on May 5, 1971, in Wiesbaden, Germany. He attended Monacan High School in Richmond, Virginia. He also attended Fork Union Military Academy.

Brown was a four-year letterman for the Virginia Tech Hokies from 1991 to 1994 and a three-year starter from 1992 to 1994. His 113 tackles in 1993 were the most on the team. He was named first-team All-Big East in 1994.

== Professional career ==
Brown was selected by the Denver Broncos in the fourth round, with the 124th overall pick, of the 1995 NFL draft. He officially signed with the team on July 7. He played in two games for the Broncos during the 1995 season. Brown was released on August 20, 1996. He later re-signed with the Broncos on January 8, 1997, but was released again on August 13, 1997.
