= Tony Kimbrough (wide receiver) =

American football player (born 1970)

No. 80
- Position: Wide receiver

Personal information
- Born: September 17, 1970 (age 56); Weir, Mississippi, U.S.
- Listed height: 6 ft 2 in (1.88 m)
- Listed weight: 192 lb (87 kg)

Career information
- High school: Weir
- College: Jackson State
- NFL draft: 1993: 7th round, 182nd overall pick

Career history
- Denver Broncos (1993–1994); Carolina Panthers (1995)*; Jacksonville Jaguars (1996)*
- * Offseason or practice squad member only

Career NFL statistics
- Games played: 27
- Receptions: 10
- Receiving yards: 99
- Touchdowns: 0
- Stats at Pro Football Reference

Antonius L. Kimbrough (born September 17, 1970) is an American former professional football player who was a wide receiver who played for two seasons in the National Football League (NFL) for the Denver Broncos (1993–1994).

Kimbrough was born in Weir, Mississippi, and played college football for the Jackson State Tigers. He was selected by the Denver Broncos in the seventh round of the 1993 NFL draft with the 182nd overall pick.
