= Bolatusha Creek =

Stream in Mississippi, U.S.

Coordinates: 32.9040203°N 89.7536919°W

Bolatusha Creek is a stream in the U.S. state of Mississippi.

Bolatusha Creek is a name derived from the Choctaw language purported to mean either "one who strikes and cuts to pieces" or "little thicket".
