= Ethel, Mississippi =

- Town
- Town of Ethel
- Location of Ethel, Mississippi

- Location in the contiguous United States
- Coordinates: 33°7′25″N 89°27′55″W
- Country: United States
- State: Mississippi
- County: Attala

Area
  - Total: 0.58 sq mi (1.51 km^{2})
  - Land: 0.58 sq mi (1.51 km^{2})
  - Water: 0 sq mi (0.00 km^{2})
- Elevation: 423 ft (129 m)

Population (2020)
  - Total: 348
  - Density: 596/sq mi (230.2/km^{2})
- Time zone: UTC-6 (Central (CST))
  - Summer (DST): UTC-5 (CDT)
- ZIP code: 39067
- Area code: 662
- FIPS code: 28-23220
- GNIS feature ID: 0669815

Ethel is a U.S. town in Attala County, Mississippi. As of the 2020 census, Ethel had a population of 348.

== History ==
Ethel is named for the daughter of Capt. S. B. McConnico. The mayor of Ethel is Gwen Sims.

== Geography ==
Ethel is located along the Yockanookany River.

According to the United States Census Bureau, the town has a total area of 0.58 square miles (1.5 km^{2}), all land.

== Demographics ==
Historical population
Census	Pop.	Note	%±
1920	466		—
1930	571		22.5%
1940	828		45.0%
1950	723		−12.7%
1960	566		−21.7%
1970	560		−1.1%
1980	486		−13.2%
1990	454		−6.6%
2000	452		−0.4%
2010	418		−7.5%
2020	348		−16.7%
U.S. Decennial Census

As of the census of 2000, there were 452 people, 173 households, and 125 families residing in the town. The population density was 752.3 inhabitants per square mile (290.5/km^{2}). There were 208 housing units at an average density of 346.2 per square mile (133.7/km^{2}). The racial makeup of the town was 54.42% White, 44.91% African American, and 0.66% from two or more races. Hispanic or Latino of any race were 0.44% of the population.

There were 173 households, out of which 39.9% had children under the age of 18 living with them, 43.4% were married couples living together, 22.5% had a female householder with no husband present, and 27.7% were non-families. 25.4% of all households were made up of individuals, and 11.6% had someone living alone who was 65 years of age or older. The average household size was 2.61 and the average family size was 3.07.

In the town, the population was spread out, with 28.8% under the age of 18, 10.8% from 18 to 24, 26.3% from 25 to 44, 21.7% from 45 to 64, and 12.4% who were 65 years of age or older. The median age was 32 years. For every 100 females, there were 98.2 males. For every 100 females age 18 and over, there were 83.0 males.

The median income for a household in the town was $20,114, and the median income for a family was $21,667. Males had a median income of $22,083 versus $13,409 for females. The per capita income for the town was $8,240. About 30.4% of families and 32.8% of the population were below the poverty line, including 48.5% of those under age 18 and 19.3% of those age 65 or over.

== Education ==
The town of Ethel is served by the Attala County School District.

== Notable people ==
- Ray Butts, inventor of the EchoSonic and FilterTron
- Icey W. Day, member of the Mississippi House of Representatives for three separate terms
- Archie Dees, professional basketball player.
- Kenneth Washington, actor on Hogan's Heroes and Adam-12
