= Weir, Mississippi =

- Town
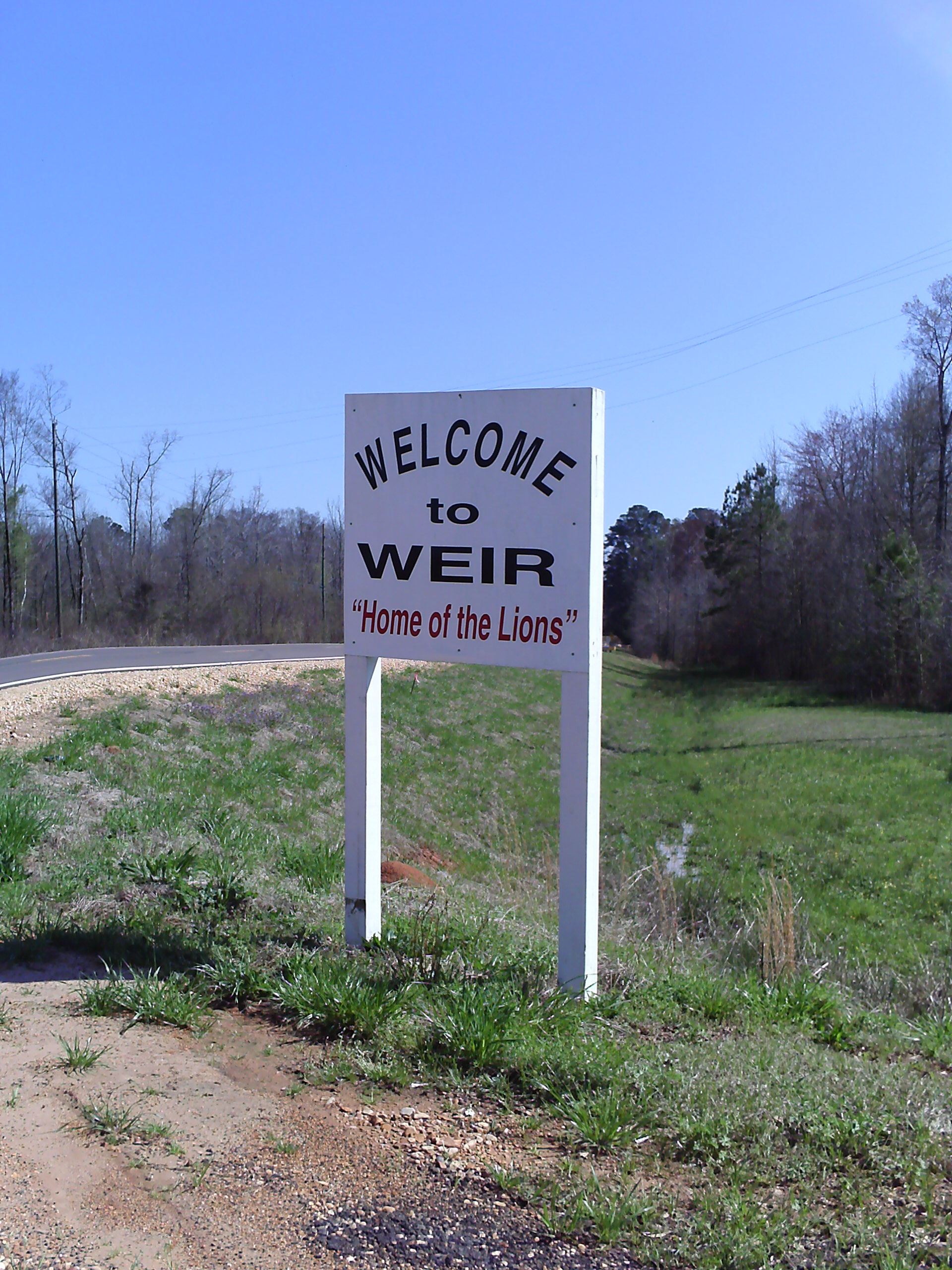
- Sign of the entrance to Weir

- Location of Weir, Mississippi
- Coordinates: 33°15′48″N 89°17′22″W
- Country: United States
- State: Mississippi
- County: Choctaw

Area
  - Total: 1.07 sq mi (2.76 km^{2})
  - Land: 1.05 sq mi (2.72 km^{2})
  - Water: 0.015 sq mi (0.04 km^{2})
- Elevation: 472 ft (144 m)

Population (2020)
  - Total: 441
  - Density: 419.5/sq mi (161.96/km^{2})
- Time zone: UTC-6 (Central (CST))
  - Summer (DST): UTC-5 (CDT)
- ZIP code: 39772
- Area code: 662
- FIPS code: 28-78520
- GNIS feature ID: 0679425

Weir is a town in Choctaw County, Mississippi, Mississippi, United States. As of the 2020 census, Weir had a population of 441.

== History ==
The town of Weir was settled by former Confederate Colonel John Weir and his brother James in 1868.

Weir experienced a tornado on April 24, 2010.

== Geography ==
Weir is located in southwestern Choctaw County, bordered on the north by the Yockanookany River. Mississippi Highway 12 passes north of the town, leading northeast to Ackerman, the county seat, and southwest to Kosciusko.

According to the United States Census Bureau, the town has a total area of 1.1 square miles (2.8 km^{2}), of which 0.02 square miles (0.04 km^{2}), or 1.43%, is water.

== Demographics ==
Historical population
Census	Pop.	Note	%±
1900	91		—
1910	220		141.8%
1920	377		71.4%
1930	570		51.2%
1940	552		−3.2%
1950	570		3.3%
1960	522		−8.4%
1970	573		9.8%
1980	553		−3.5%
1990	525		−5.1%
2000	553		5.3%
2010	459		−17.0%
2020	441		−3.9%
U.S. Decennial Census

=== Racial and ethnic composition ===
Weir town, Mississippi – Racial and ethnic composition Note: the US Census treats Hispanic/Latino as an ethnic category. This table excludes Latinos from the racial categories and assigns them to a separate category. Hispanics/Latinos may be of any race.
Race / ethnicity (NH = Non-Hispanic)	Pop 2000	Pop 2010	Pop 2020	% 2000	% 2010	% 2020
White alone (NH)	250	197	146	45.21%	42.92%	33.11%
Black or African American alone (NH)	297	260	271	53.71%	56.64%	61.45%
Native American or Alaska Native alone (NH)	5	2	0	0.90%	0.44%	0.00%
Asian alone (NH)	0	0	0	0.00%	0.00%	0.00%
Native Hawaiian or Pacific Islander alone (NH)	0	0	0	0.00%	0.00%	0.00%
Other Race alone (NH)	0	0	0	0.00%	0.00%	0.00%
Mixed race or Multiracial (NH)	0	0	14	0.00%	0.00%	3.17%
Hispanic or Latino (any race)	1	0	10	0.18%	0.00%	2.27%
Total	553	459	441	100.00%	100.00%	100.00%

=== 2020 census ===
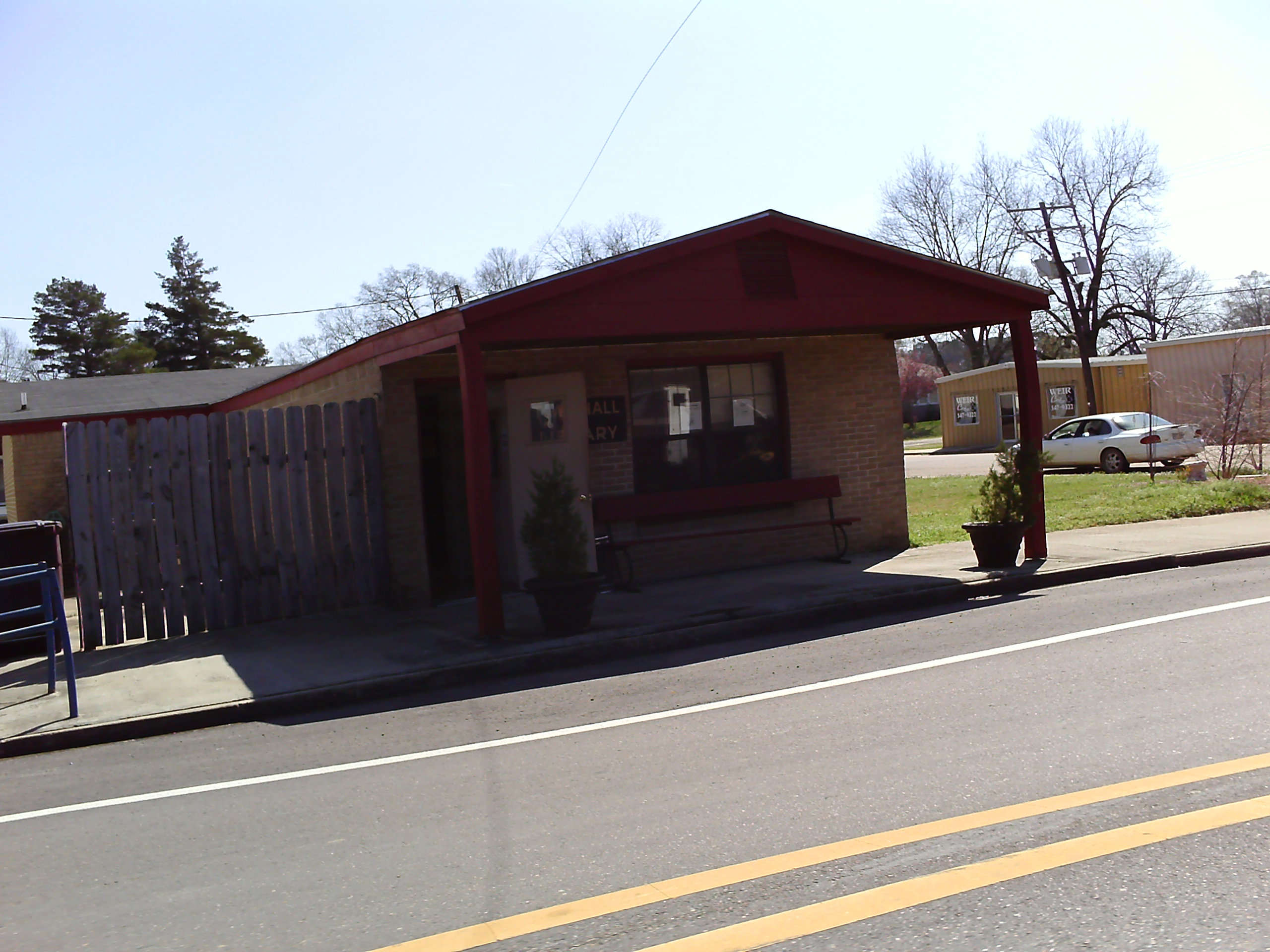
Town Hall and Library

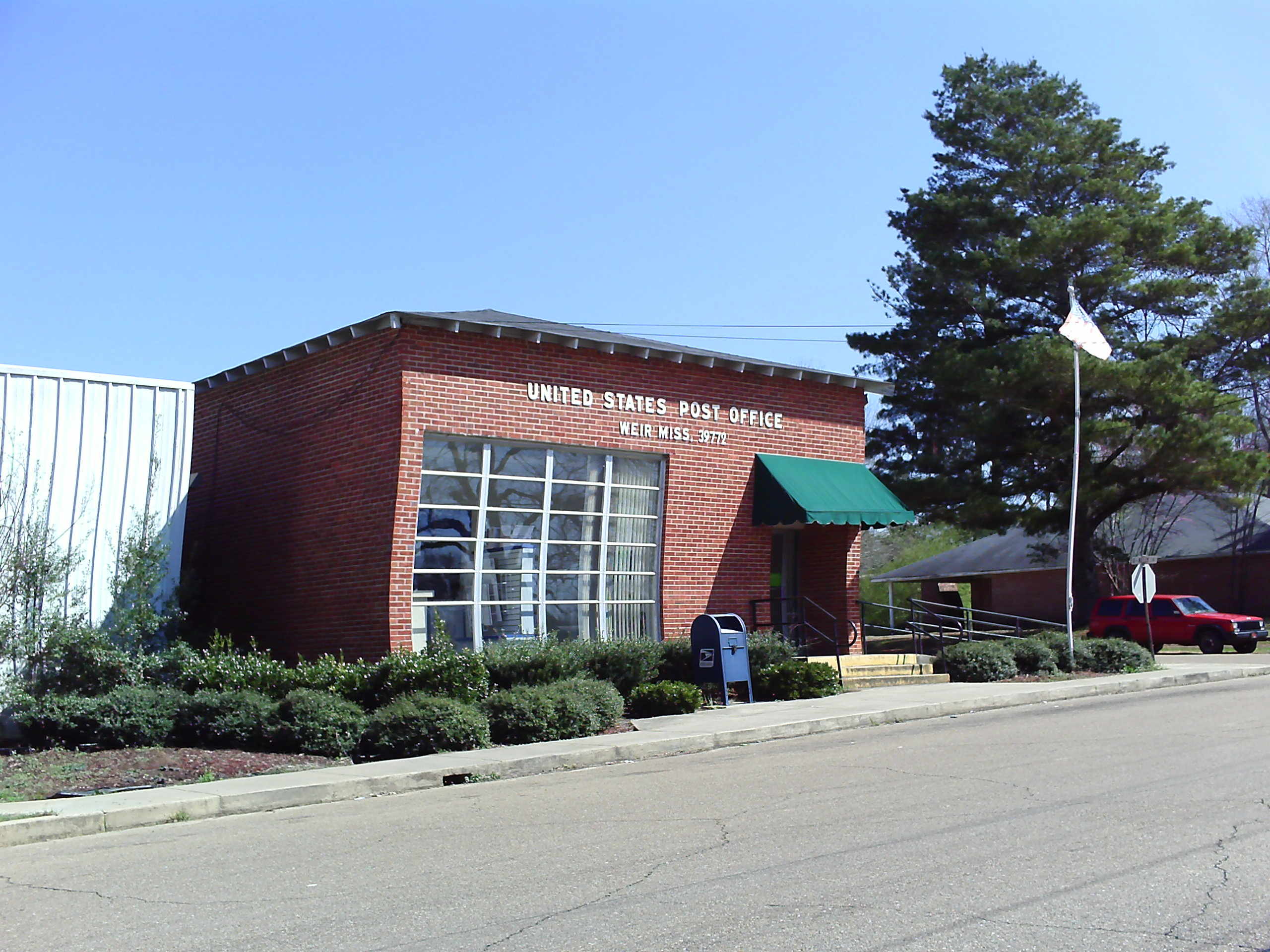
Post Office

As of the census of 2000, there were 553 people, 208 households, and 149 families residing in the town. The population density was 526.5 inhabitants per square mile (203.3/km^{2}). There were 234 housing units at an average density of 222.8 per square mile (86.0/km^{2}). The racial makeup of the town was 45.21% White, 53.71% African American, 0.90% Native American, 0.18% from other races. Hispanic or Latino of any race were 0.18% of the population.

There were 208 households, out of which 34.1% had children under the age of 18 living with them, 44.7% were married couples living together, 22.6% had a female householder with no husband present, and 27.9% were non-families. 25.5% of all households were made up of individuals, and 13.9% had someone living alone who was 65 years of age or older. The average household size was 2.66 and the average family size was 3.19.

In the town, the population was spread out, with 31.1% under the age of 18, 9.9% from 18 to 24, 25.5% from 25 to 44, 18.1% from 45 to 64, and 15.4% who were 65 years of age or older. The median age was 34 years. For every 100 females, there were 87.5 males. For every 100 females age 18 and over, there were 78.0 males.

The median income for a household in the town was $23,125, and the median income for a family was $28,472. Males had a median income of $31,875 versus $16,250 for females. The per capita income for the town was $13,697. About 19.7% of families and 25.3% of the population were below the poverty line, including 33.1% of those under age 18 and 24.7% of those age 65 or over.

== Education ==
Weir is home to Weir Elementary Center, a pre-kindergarten through 6th grade school. It is part of the Choctaw County School District. The school once was known statewide for its football program which competed in ten state championships between 1984 and 2004, winning six 1A state football titles.

The school received a new building in 2005 that was dedicated to Mr. Marion Kelly who served as teacher, coach, and principal for approximately 40 years.

== Notable people ==
- Dennis Johnson, former fullback and tight end in the National Football League for the Buffalo Bills and New York Giants
- Kenneth Johnson, NFL defensive back for the Green Bay Packers
- Tony Kimbrough, former NFL wide receiver
- Alvin McKinley, former National Football League defensive tackle
- Roy Oswalt, former pitcher for the Houston Astros
