= McCool, Mississippi =

- Town
- Location of McCool, Mississippi

- Location in the United States
- Coordinates: 33°11′54″N 89°20′35″W
- Country: United States
- State: Mississippi
- County: Attala

Area
  - Total: 0.94 sq mi (2.44 km^{2})
  - Land: 0.94 sq mi (2.43 km^{2})
  - Water: 0.0039 sq mi (0.01 km^{2})
- Elevation: 466 ft (142 m)

Population (2020)
  - Total: 103
  - Density: 109.7/sq mi (42.36/km^{2})
- Time zone: UTC-6 (Central (CST))
  - Summer (DST): UTC-5 (CDT)
- ZIP code: 39108
- Area code: 662
- FIPS code: 28-43400
- GNIS feature ID: 0673311

McCool is a town in Attala County, Mississippi. As of the 2020 census, McCool had a population of 103.

== History ==
McCool post office was established September 11, 1883, with Charles W. Thompson as first postmaster. The town was named for James F. McCool, Chancellor of the 6th Chancery court district of Mississippi, and former speaker of the Mississippi House of Representatives.

The population was 317 in 1900.

== Geography ==
According to the United States Census Bureau, the town has a total area of 0.9 square miles (2.3 km^{2}), all land.

== Demographics ==
Historical population
Census	Pop.	Note	%±
1890	246		—
1900	317		28.9%
1910	422		33.1%
1920	517		22.5%
1930	562		8.7%
1940	373		−33.6%
1950	305		−18.2%
1960	211		−30.8%
1970	225		6.6%
1980	203		−9.8%
1990	169		−16.7%
2000	182		7.7%
2010	135		−25.8%
2020	103		−23.7%
U.S. Decennial Census

As of the census of 2000, there were 182 people, 72 households, and 49 families residing in the town. The population density was 193.6 inhabitants per square mile (74.7/km^{2}). There were 82 housing units at an average density of 87.2 per square mile (33.7/km^{2}). The racial makeup of the town was 73.08% White, 25.82% African American, 0.55% Asian, and 0.55% from two or more races.

There were 72 households, out of which 31.9% had children under the age of 18 living with them, 55.6% were married couples living together, 8.3% had a female householder with no husband present, and 31.9% were non-families. 27.8% of all households were made up of individuals, and 16.7% had someone living alone who was 65 years of age or older. The average household size was 2.53 and the average family size was 3.14.

In the town, the population was spread out, with 20.9% under the age of 18, 12.1% from 18 to 24, 25.3% from 25 to 44, 23.1% from 45 to 64, and 18.7% who were 65 years of age or older. The median age was 41 years. For every 100 females, there were 87.6 males. For every 100 females age 18 and over, there were 73.5 males.

The median income for a household in the town was $19,659, and the median income for a family was $27,083. Males had a median income of $24,583 versus $20,000 for females. The per capita income for the town was $10,760. About 18.4% of families and 19.6% of the population were below the poverty line, including 13.5% of those under the age of eighteen and 11.4% of those 65 or over.

== Education ==
The town of McCool is served by the Attala County School District.

== Notable people ==
- Thomas U. Sisson, member of the United States House of Representatives from 1909 to 1923
- Margaret Wade, basketball coach, member of the Basketball Hall of Fame
- John D. Winters, historian, author of The Civil War in Louisiana (1963), was born in McCool but reared in Lake Providence, Louisiana.
