= Yockanookany River =

River in the U.S. state of Mississippi

Coordinates: 32°40′9″N 89°40′46″W

Yockanookany River Yexgonnongoune River Yockahockany River Yockammockanna Creek Yokahocany River Yokahochany River Yokahockana River Yokahockany Creek Yokahockany River
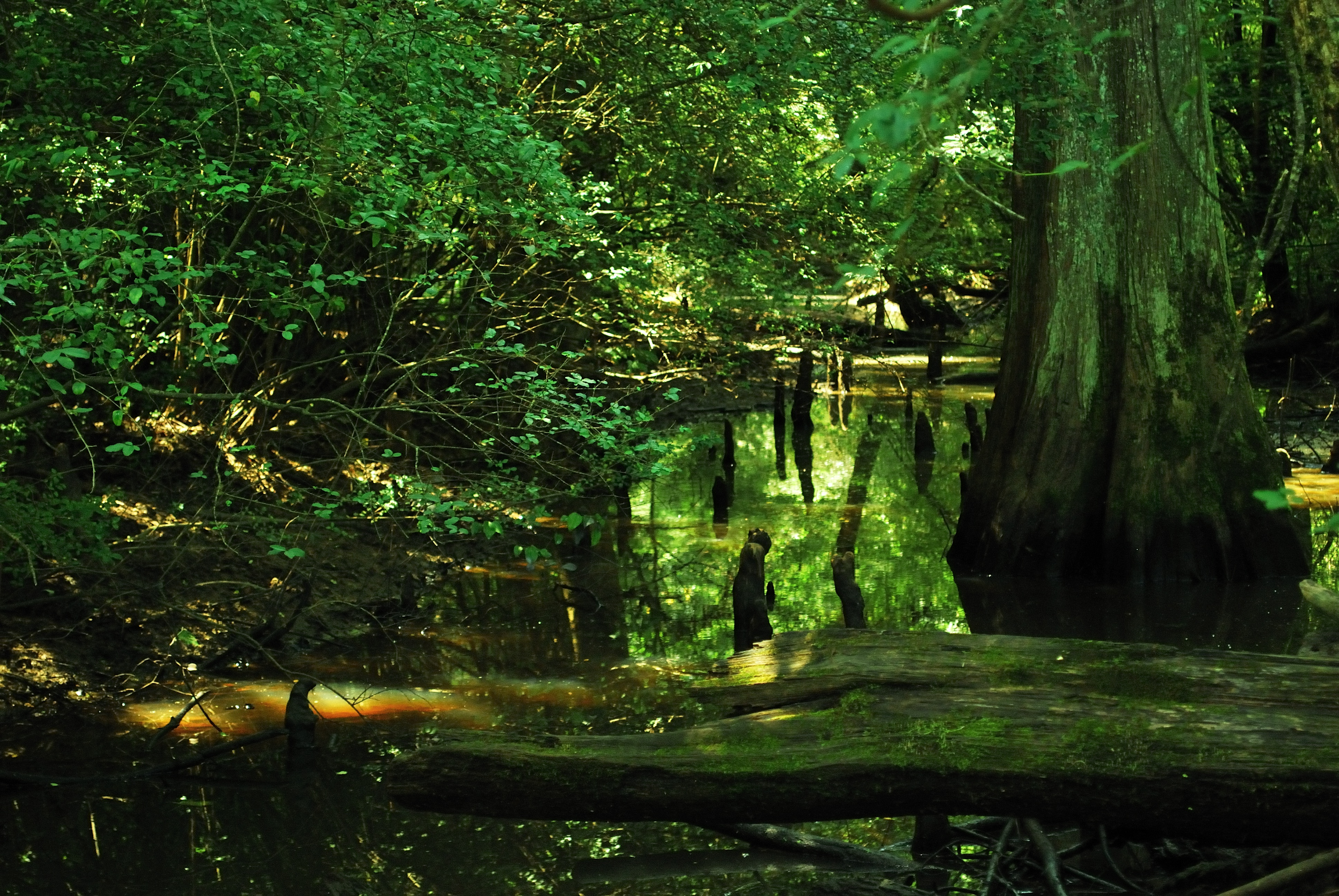
- Etymology: Choctaw for "land creek"

Location
- Country: United States
- State: Mississippi

Physical characteristics
- Source
  - location: West side of Ackerman, Choctaw County
- Mouth: Pearl River
  - location: Southwestern Leake County
- Length: 126.2 km (78.4 mi)

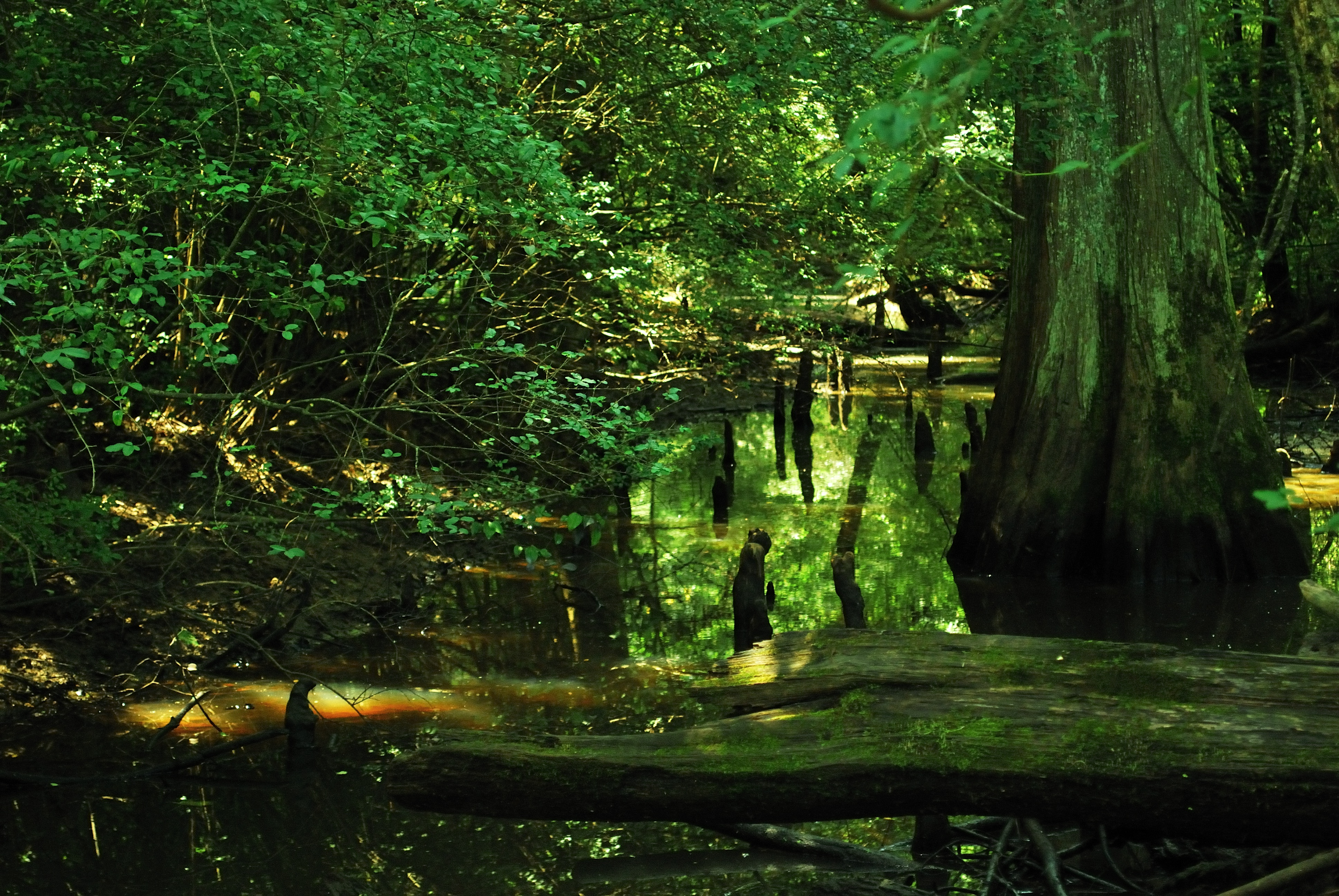
Yockanookany River in 2010

The Yockanookany River is a 78.4-mile-long (126.2 km) river in central Mississippi in the United States. It is a tributary of the Pearl River, which flows to the Gulf of Mexico.

== Course ==
The Yockanookany rises in Choctaw County on the west side of the town of Ackerman and flows generally southwest through Attala and Leake counties, past the towns of Weir, McCool, Ethel and Kosciusko. It joins the Pearl River in southwestern Leake County.

The Yockanookany's upper course through Choctaw and Attala counties was channelized in 1914 and the middle section was completed in 1928; in some of these areas, water continues to flow in the river's old natural channel as well. Low-water stages at the Koscuisko gauge in 1960 were six feet higher than those of 1939 as the channel silted significantly during that period.

Downstream of Kosciusko, the river is paralleled by the Natchez Trace Parkway.

== Name ==
Yockanookany is a name derived from the Choctaw language purported to mean "land creek".

The United States Board on Geographic Names settled on "Yockanookany River" as the stream's name in 1949. According to the Geographic Names Information System, the river has also been known as:

- Yexgonnongoune River
- Yockahockany River
- Yockammockanna Creek
- Yokahocany River
- Yokahochany River
- Yokahockana River
- Yokahockany Creek
- Yokahockany River

== See also ==
- List of rivers in Mississippi

== Sources ==
- Columbia Gazetteer of North America entry
