= Sallis, Mississippi =

- Town
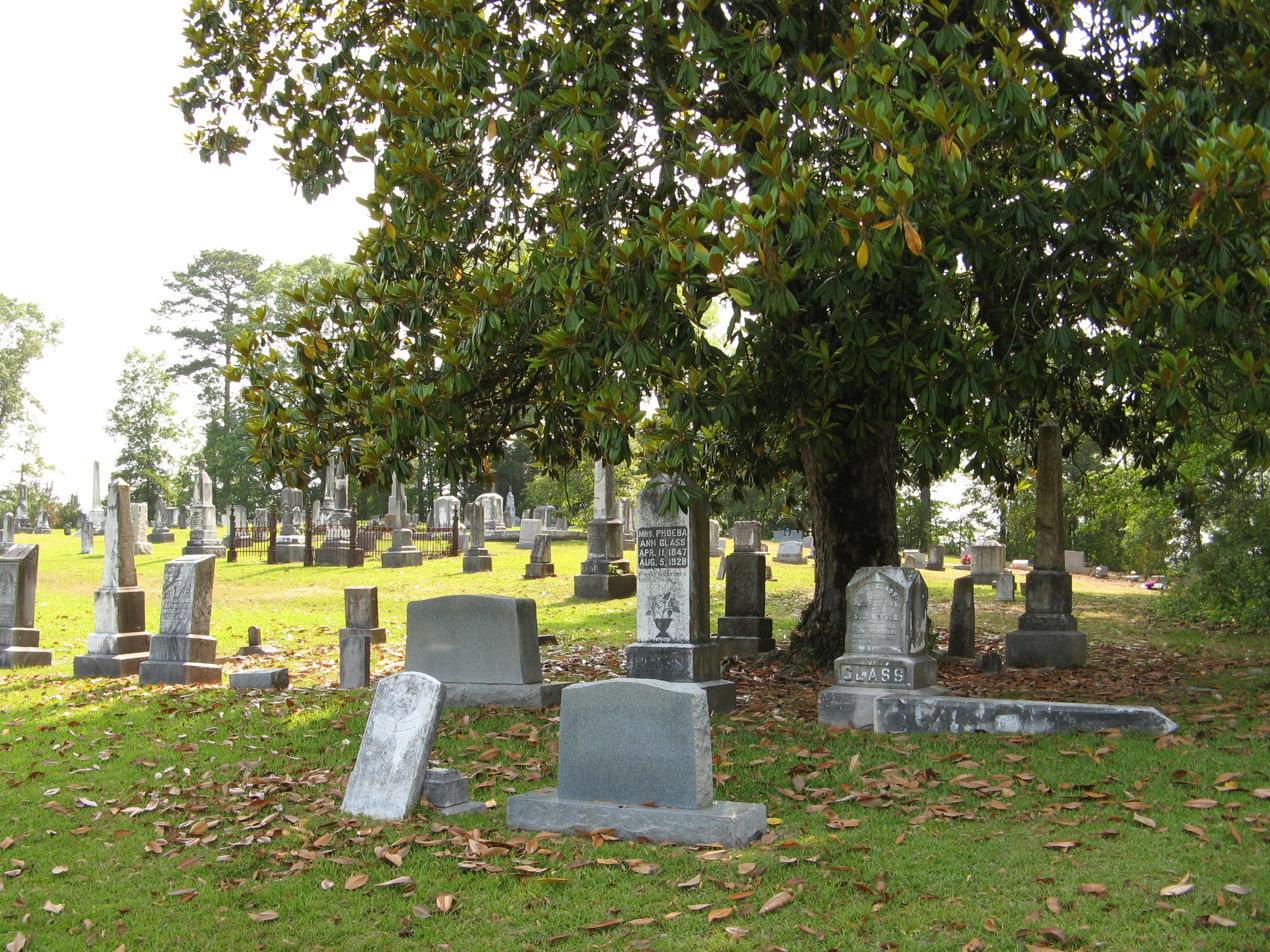
- Sallis Cemetery

- Location of Sallis, Mississippi

- Location in the United States
- Coordinates: 33°1′14″N 89°45′52″W
- Country: United States
- State: Mississippi
- County: Attala

Area
  - Total: 0.41 sq mi (1.06 km^{2})
  - Land: 0.41 sq mi (1.06 km^{2})
  - Water: 0 sq mi (0.00 km^{2})
- Elevation: 325 ft (99 m)

Population (2020)
  - Total: 131
  - Density: 318.6/sq mi (123.01/km^{2})
- Time zone: UTC-6 (Central (CST))
  - Summer (DST): UTC-5 (CDT)
- ZIP code: 39160
- Area code: 662
- FIPS code: 28-64800
- GNIS feature ID: 0677299

Sallis is a town in Attala County, Mississippi, United States. As of the 2020 census, Sallis had a population of 131.

== History ==
Sallis was founded in 1874, and named for Dr. James D. Sallis, the former owner of the town site.

By 1906, Sallis had a post-office, school, steam grist mill, and several churches. The population was estimated at 850.

Sallis is located along a now-abandoned section of the Illinois Central Railroad, and a station was located there.

The Mayor of Sallis is Luke Eaton.

== Geography ==
According to the United States Census Bureau, the town has a total area of 0.4 square miles (1.0 km^{2}), all land.

== Demographics ==
Historical population
Census	Pop.	Note	%±
1880	132		—
1890	156		18.2%
1900	195		25.0%
1910	247		26.7%
1920	273		10.5%
1930	364		33.3%
1940	287		−21.2%
1950	228		−20.6%
1960	223		−2.2%
1970	213		−4.5%
1980	211		−0.9%
1990	139		−34.1%
2000	114		−18.0%
2010	134		17.5%
2020	131		−2.2%
U.S. Decennial Census

As of the census of 2000, there were 114 people, 50 households, and 34 families residing in the town. The population density was 273.5 inhabitants per square mile (105.6/km^{2}). There were 58 housing units at an average density of 139.2 per square mile (53.7/km^{2}). The racial makeup of the town was 71.93% White and 28.07% African American.

There were 50 households, out of which 30.0% had children under the age of 18 living with them, 54.0% were married couples living together, 14.0% had a female householder with no husband present, and 32.0% were non-families. 30.0% of all households were made up of individuals, and 18.0% had someone living alone who was 65 years of age or older. The average household size was 2.28 and the average family size was 2.79.

In the town, the population was spread out, with 24.6% under the age of 18, 5.3% from 18 to 24, 24.6% from 25 to 44, 25.4% from 45 to 64, and 20.2% who were 65 years of age or older. The median age was 43 years. For every 100 females, there were 83.9 males. For every 100 females age 18 and over, there were 72.0 males.

The median income for a household in the town was $27,500, and the median income for a family was $33,750. Males had a median income of $22,500 versus $13,750 for females. The per capita income for the town was $14,432. There were 23.5% of families and 24.8% of the population living below the poverty line, including 53.8% of under eighteens and 25.0% of those over 64.

== Education ==
The town of Sallis is served by the Attala County School District.

== Notable people ==
- Jimmy Holiday, R&B singer and songwriter
- David Barksdale, American gangster and activist
