= Attala County, Mississippi =

County in Mississippi, United States

- County
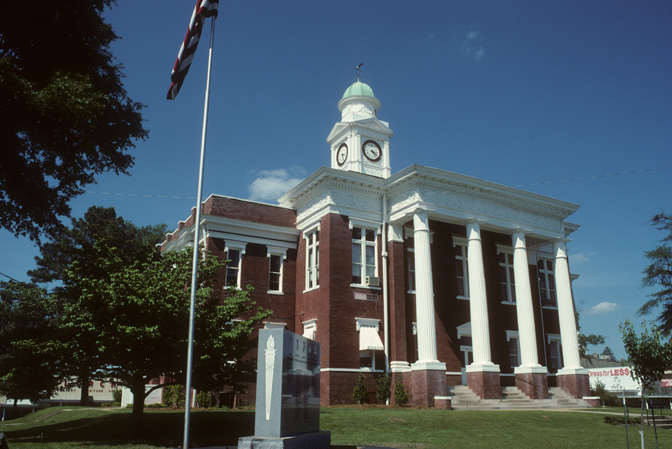
- Attala County Courthouse in Kosciusko

- Location within the U.S. state of Mississippi
- Coordinates: 33°05′N 89°35′W
- Country: United States
- State: Mississippi
- Founded: 1833
- Seat: Kosciusko
- Largest city: Kosciusko

Area
  - Total: 737 sq mi (1,910 km^{2})
  - Land: 735 sq mi (1,900 km^{2})
  - Water: 1.7 sq mi (4.4 km^{2}) 0.2%

Population (2020)
  - Total: 17,889
  - Estimate (2025): 17,100 ▼
  - Density: 24.3/sq mi (9.40/km^{2})
- Time zone: UTC−6 (Central)
  - Summer (DST): UTC−5 (CDT)
- Congressional district: 2nd
- Website: www.attalacounty.net

Attala County (/ˈætələ/ AT-əl-ə) is a county located in the U.S. state of Mississippi. As of the 2020 census, the population was 17,889. Its county seat is Kosciusko. Attala County is named for Atala, a fictional Native American heroine from an early-19th-century novel of the same name by François-René de Chateaubriand.

== Geography ==
According to the U.S. Census Bureau, the county has a total area of 737 square miles (1,910 km^{2}), of which 735 square miles (1,900 km^{2}) is land and 1.7 square miles (4.4 km^{2}) (0.2%) is water. It is bound by the Big Black River, a tributary of the Mississippi River, in the west.

=== Major roads ===
- Mississippi Highway 12
- Mississippi Highway 14
- Mississippi Highway 19
- Mississippi Highway 25
- Mississippi Highway 35
- Mississippi Highway 43
- Natchez Trace Parkway

=== Adjacent counties ===
- Montgomery County (north)
- Choctaw County (northeast)
- Winston County (east)
- Leake County (south)
- Madison County (southwest)
- Holmes County (west)
- Carroll County (northwest)

=== National protected area ===
- Natchez Trace Parkway (part)

== Demographics ==
Historical population
Census	Pop.	Note	%±
1840	4,303		—
1850	10,991		155.4%
1860	14,169		28.9%
1870	14,776		4.3%
1880	19,988		35.3%
1890	22,213		11.1%
1900	26,248		18.2%
1910	28,851		9.9%
1920	24,831		−13.9%
1930	26,035		4.8%
1940	30,227		16.1%
1950	26,652		−11.8%
1960	21,335		−19.9%
1970	19,570		−8.3%
1980	19,865		1.5%
1990	18,481		−7.0%
2000	19,661		6.4%
2010	19,564		−0.5%
2020	17,889		−8.6%
2025 (est.)	17,100	▼	−4.4%
U.S. Decennial Census; 1790-1960 1900-1990; 1990-2000 2010-2013

=== Racial and ethnic composition ===
Leake County, Mississippi – Racial and ethnic composition Note: the US Census treats Hispanic/Latino as an ethnic category. This table excludes Latinos from the racial categories and assigns them to a separate category. Hispanics/Latinos may be of any race.
Race / Ethnicity (NH = Non-Hispanic)	Pop 1980	Pop 1990	Pop 2000	Pop 2010	Pop 2020	% 1980	% 1990	% 2000	% 2010	% 2020
White alone (NH)	12,017	11,103	11,369	10,866	9,410	60.49%	60.08%	57.83%	55.54%	52.60%
Black or African American alone (NH)	7,695	7,260	7,826	8,180	7,642	38.74%	39.28%	39.80%	41.81%	42.72%
Native American or Alaska Native alone (NH)	23	32	31	35	29	0.12%	0.17%	0.16%	0.18%	0.16%
Asian alone (NH)	9	26	52	53	97	0.05%	0.14%	0.26%	0.27%	0.54%
Native Hawaiian or Pacific Islander alone (NH)	x	x	0	4	4	x	x	0.00%	0.02%	0.02%
Other race alone (NH)	5	2	7	6	37	0.03%	0.01%	0.04%	0.03%	0.21%
Mixed race or Multiracial (NH)	x	x	96	97	339	x	x	0.49%	0.50%	1.90%
Hispanic or Latino (any race)	116	58	280	323	331	0.58%	0.31%	1.42%	1.65%	1.85%
Total	19,865	18,481	19,661	19,564	17,889	100.00%	100.00%	100.00%	100.00%	100.00%

=== 2020 census ===
As of the 2020 census, the county had a population of 17,889. The median age was 41.6 years. 24.6% of residents were under the age of 18 and 20.7% of residents were 65 years of age or older. For every 100 females there were 91.5 males, and for every 100 females age 18 and over there were 88.6 males age 18 and over.

The racial makeup of the county was 52.8% White, 42.9% Black or African American, 0.2% American Indian and Alaska Native, 0.5% Asian, <0.1% Native Hawaiian and Pacific Islander, 1.3% from some other race, and 2.2% from two or more races. Hispanic or Latino residents of any race comprised 1.9% of the population.

37.5% of residents lived in urban areas, while 62.5% lived in rural areas.

There were 7,098 households in the county, of which 32.1% had children under the age of 18 living in them. Of all households, 42.7% were married-couple households, 18.5% were households with a male householder and no spouse or partner present, and 33.8% were households with a female householder and no spouse or partner present. About 28.3% of all households were made up of individuals and 14.4% had someone living alone who was 65 years of age or older.

There were 8,277 housing units, of which 14.2% were vacant. Among occupied housing units, 73.3% were owner-occupied and 26.7% were renter-occupied. The homeowner vacancy rate was 1.4% and the rental vacancy rate was 8.1%.

=== 2010 census ===
As of the 2010 United States census, there were 19,564 people living in the county, down from its peak in 1940. 56.2% were White, 42.0% Black or African American, 0.3% Asian, 0.2% Native American, 0.7% of some other race and 0.6% of two or more races. 1.7% were Hispanic or Latino (of any race).

=== 2000 census ===
As of the census of 2000, there were 19,661 people, 7,567 households, and 5,380 families living in the county. The population density was 27 people per square mile (10 people/km^{2}). There were 8,639 housing units at an average density of 12 units per square mile (4.6 units/km^{2}). The racial makeup of the county was 58.34% White, 40.00% Black or African American, 0.17% Native American, 0.27% Asian, 0.65% from other races, and 0.57% from two or more races. 1.42% of the population were Hispanic or Latino of any race.

There were 7,567 households, out of which 32.10% had children under the age of 18 living with them, 50.30% were married couples living together, 16.70% had a female householder with no husband present, and 28.90% were non-families. 26.40% of all households were made up of individuals, and 14.50% had someone living alone who was 65 years of age or older. The average household size was 2.55 and the average family size was 3.07.

In the county, the population was spread out, with 25.90% under the age of 18, 9.20% from 18 to 24, 25.20% from 25 to 44, 22.40% from 45 to 64, and 17.30% who were 65 years of age or older. The median age was 37 years. For every 100 females there were 91.50 males. For every 100 females age 18 and over, there were 86.70 males.

The median income for a household in the county was $24,794, and the median income for a family was $30,796. Males had a median income of $26,180 versus $17,394 for females. The per capita income for the county was $13,782. About 18.30% of families and 21.80% of the population were below the poverty line, including 28.60% of those under age 18 and 21.40% of those age 65 or over.

== Communities ==
=== Cities ===
- Kosciusko (county seat)

=== Towns ===
- Ethel
- McCool
- Sallis

=== Unincorporated communities ===
- Hesterville
- McAdams
- Possumneck
- Williamsville
- Zama

=== Ghost towns ===
- Sand Hill
- Valena

== Notable people ==
- Robert Burt (1873–1955) African American physician, born in Attala County
- Myrtis Methvin was elected in 1932 as the second woman mayor in Louisiana and took office in Castor in Bienville Parish, serving from 1933 to 1945. She was born in Attala County in 1895.
- John D. Winters, a historian of the American Civil War, was born in Attala County in 1917.
- The Choctaw Chief Kiliahote was born here in 1826.

== Politics ==
United States presidential election results for Attala County, Mississippi
Year	Republican		Democratic		Third party(ies)	
Year	No.	%	No.	%	No.	%
1912	49	4.03%	1,060	87.17%	107	8.80%
1916	110	7.83%	1,267	90.24%	27	1.92%
1920	270	18.27%	1,187	80.31%	21	1.42%
1924	119	6.74%	1,600	90.60%	47	2.66%
1928	113	4.77%	2,258	95.23%	0	0.00%
1932	38	1.57%	2,370	97.97%	11	0.45%
1936	36	1.90%	1,855	97.79%	6	0.32%
1940	63	2.97%	2,049	96.65%	8	0.38%
1944	87	3.83%	2,187	96.17%	0	0.00%
1948	32	1.30%	130	5.27%	2,305	93.43%
1952	1,178	34.28%	2,258	65.72%	0	0.00%
1956	445	16.74%	1,793	67.46%	420	15.80%
1960	650	19.89%	1,337	40.91%	1,281	39.20%
1964	4,409	94.37%	263	5.63%	0	0.00%
1968	599	8.60%	1,588	22.81%	4,776	68.59%
1972	4,738	79.50%	1,103	18.51%	119	2.00%
1976	3,146	42.38%	4,068	54.80%	209	2.82%
1980	3,975	48.39%	4,117	50.12%	122	1.49%
1984	4,870	59.28%	3,327	40.50%	18	0.22%
1988	4,524	59.87%	2,997	39.66%	35	0.46%
1992	3,520	49.67%	3,015	42.54%	552	7.79%
1996	3,130	47.34%	3,092	46.76%	390	5.90%
2000	4,206	58.64%	2,922	40.74%	45	0.63%
2004	5,014	61.09%	3,145	38.32%	48	0.58%
2008	5,273	57.42%	3,849	41.91%	61	0.66%
2012	5,126	56.38%	3,927	43.19%	39	0.43%
2016	4,897	59.31%	3,242	39.27%	117	1.42%
2020	5,178	58.69%	3,542	40.15%	103	1.17%
2024	4,723	61.31%	2,930	38.04%	50	0.65%

== See also ==
- Attala County School District
- National Register of Historic Places listings in Attala County, Mississippi
