= East Oktibbeha County High School =

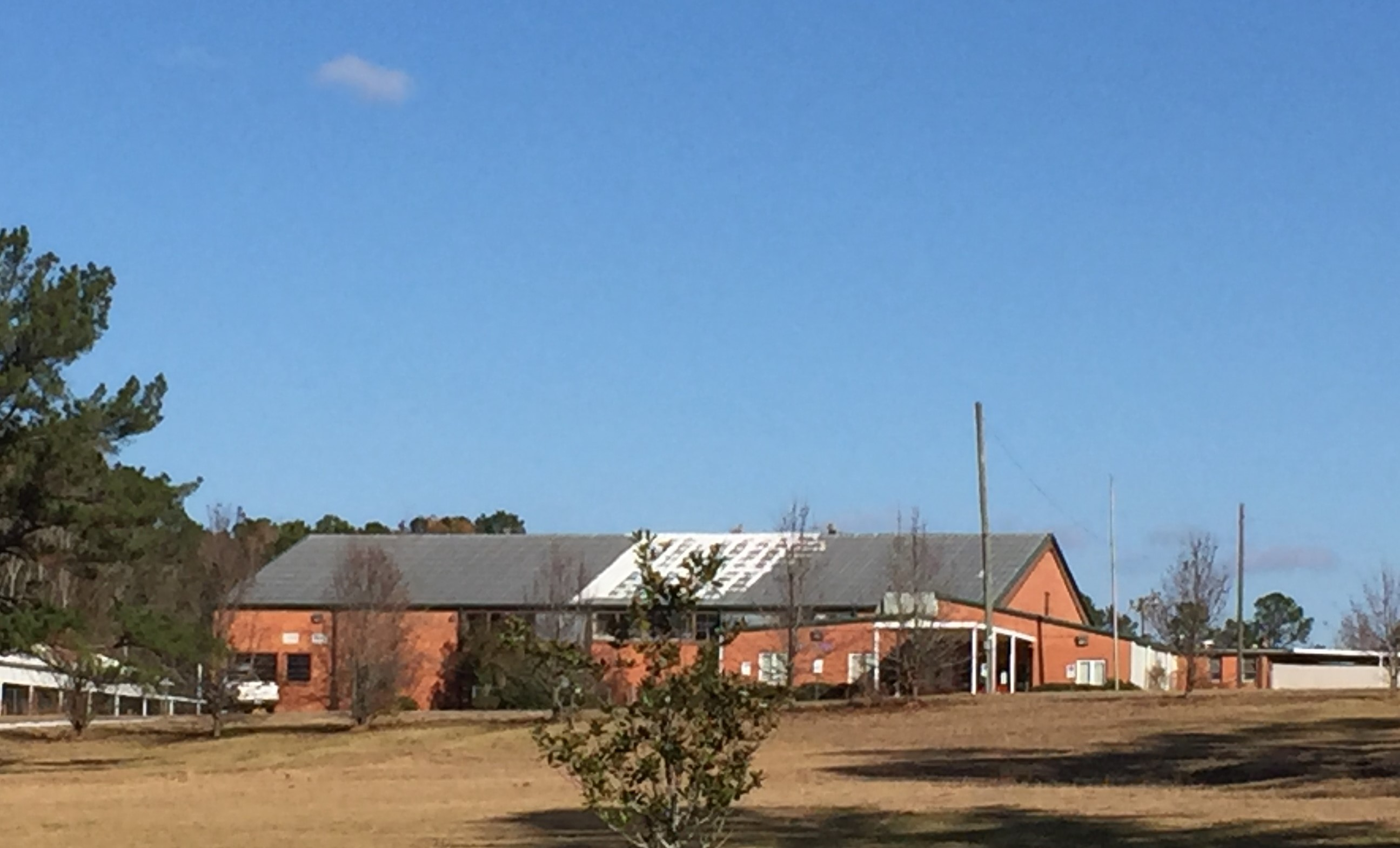
- The former B.L. Moor High School building in Oktoc, Mississippi

Location
- 1780 Moor High Road; Oktoc, Mississippi; U.S.
- Coordinates: 33.3331°N 88.7128°W

Information
- Type: Public
- Closed: 2015
- Grades: 9–12
- Nickname: Titans
- Last updated: 31 December 2017

East Oktibbeha County High School (EOCHS) was a public secondary school located in unincorporated Oktibbeha County, Mississippi, near Crawford. It was a part of the Oktibbeha County School District, and was formed by the consolidation of two traditionally black high schools, Moor and Alexander.

In 2015 the schools of Oktibbeha County district consolidated into the Starkville Oktibbeha Consolidated School District, and this school consolidated into Starkville High School.

As of 2016, the buildings were abandoned.

== Notable alumni ==
- April Sykes (2008), basketball player
