= Alexander High School (Mississippi) =

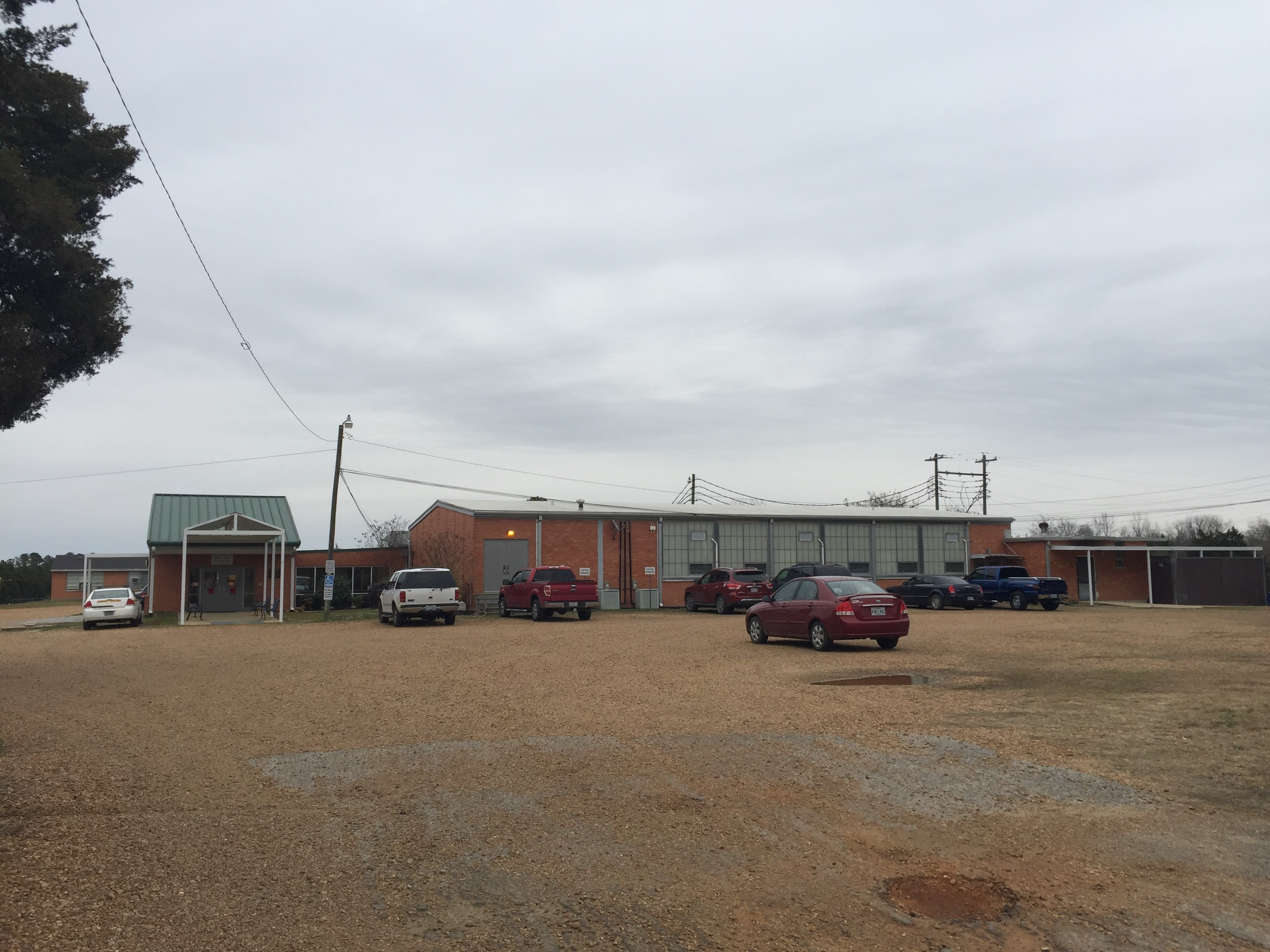

Location
- 2926 16th Section Road; Osborn, Mississippi; United States
- Coordinates: 33.5194°N 88.7411°W

Information
- Type: Public
- Closed: 1970
- Grades: 9–12
- Last updated: 31 December 2017

Alexander High School was a historically black, K-12 public school in rural Oktibbeha County, Mississippi, United States.

== History ==
Alexander served as an elementary, junior high and senior high school for black students until the public schools were integrated in 1970, after which it was technically integrated, although very few white students ever attended. It was later combined with Moor High School to form East Oktibbeha County High School on the site of Moor High School. Eventually, the Mississippi Legislature forced the predominantly white Starkville School District to merge with the Oktibbeha County School District to become the Starkville Oktibbeha Consolidated School District.
