= Helen Hay =

Helen Hay may refer to:

- Helen Scott Hay (1869–1932), American nurse
- Helen Hay Whitney (1876–1944), American writer, socialite, and philanthropist
- Helen Haye (1874–1957), British stage and film actress

== See also ==
- Helen Hayes (disambiguation)
- Hay (surname)
