= Alexander High School =

Alexander High School may refer to:

- Alexander High School (Mississippi), Oktibbeha County, Mississippi; closed 1970
- Alexander High School (North Dakota), Alexander, North Dakota, a high school in North Dakota
- Alexander High School (Ohio), Albany, Ohio
- Robert S. Alexander High School, Douglasville, Georgia
- John B. Alexander High School, Laredo, Texas
