= Starkville Academy =

Segregation academy in Starkville, Mississippi

Location
- 505 Academy Road; Starkville, Mississippi 39759; 33.4427°N 88.8188°W

Information
- Type: Private
- Established: 1969
- Principal: Brian Stockton
- Head of school: Rob Shillito
- Teaching staff: 43.5
- Grades: K-12
- Enrollment: 657
- Colors: Blue and orange
- Nickname: Volunteers
- Accreditation: MAIS
- Website: www.starkvilleacademy.org

Starkville Academy (SA) is a private kindergarten through 12th grade school in Starkville, Mississippi, operated by the Oktibbeha Educational Foundation. It was founded in 1969 on property adjacent to Starkville High School as a segregation academy.

== History ==
Before 1969, Starkville maintained a dual system of education, with Black students attending Oktibbeha County Training School (which was later renamed Henderson High School in an attempt to encourage Black students to attend there), while White students attended much better-funded Starkville High School. When the federal government enforced school integration, many white parents sought ways to keep their children from attending schools alongside Black students. Starkville Academy was founded in 1969 to provide white children a segregated education. According to legislator Horace Harned, "We felt that this [desegregation] would destroy the effectiveness of our public schools and that we must act to oppose and, if possible, reverse this unconstitutional decision to preserve our sovereignty. Thus followed the movement to private schools in the South and the formation of the State Sovereignty Commission by the legislature." Governor John Bell Williams attempted to provide state tuition assistance, tax credits and text books to fund all-white academies.

In 1970, the Oktibbeha Educational Foundation's tax exempt status was revoked after it declined to provide the IRS with documentation that the school had a racially nondiscriminatory admissions policy.

In 1974, Starkville Academy was among a group of all-white private schools sued by parents of black children enrolled in Humphreys County public schools in the case Bishop v. Starkville Academy. The parents asked for an injunction blocking payments under a Mississippi program that provided tuition grants for intellectually disabled students to attend private schools. In 1977 a three-judge panel from the United States District Court for the Northern District of Mississippi unanimously ruled that, since the program allowed the grants to be used at schools with racially restrictive admissions policies, such as Starkville Academy, the program violated the Equal Protection Clause of the United States Constitution.

The school property was annexed into Starkville in 1980, but was not charged for certain public services provided by the city. In 1984, the NAACP filed a lawsuit alleging that the city of Starkville had illegally provided free water and electricity to the school. The NAACP claimed that the free utility service was unconstitutional aid to a school that practiced racial discrimination.

In 1993, the NAACP asked Starkville School District to follow the precedent set in Cook v. Hudson and bar public school teachers from sending their own children to Starkville Academy and other racially discriminatory private schools. At the time, the head of Starkville Academy said no blacks had ever applied or enrolled. In 1999, a Oktibbeha County school board member did not seek reelection so he could enroll his son in Starkville Academy.

Contrary to predictions, the school experienced an outflow of students when the predominantly white Starkville School district merged with the predominantly black Oktibbeha County School District to form the Starkville Oktibbeha Consolidated School District in 2015.

== Demographics ==
As of 2012, the student population was 96% white, 2% Asian, 1% Hispanic and 1% black. In the 2015–16 school year, eight of 615 students were black.

== Athletics ==
Starkville Academy competes under the nickname Volunteers within the Mississippi Association of Independent Schools league.

In 2019, the Starkville Academy football team won the MAIS AAA State Championship over Indianola Academy to win the 7th MAIS Championship in the history of the school.

In 2016, the Starkville Academy girls soccer team won their first MAIS soccer championship (Division III) by defeating Hartfield Academy.

== Notable alumni ==
- Scott Tracy Griffin, author
- Neely Tucker, journalist, author
- Casey Woods, NCAA football coach
