= Longview, Mississippi =

- Census-designated place
- Location within Mississippi Location within the United States
- Coordinates: 33°24′14″N 88°55′16″W
- Country: United States
- State: Mississippi
- County: Oktibbeha

Area
  - Total: 1.68 sq mi (4.34 km^{2})
  - Land: 1.67 sq mi (4.32 km^{2})
  - Water: 0.0077 sq mi (0.02 km^{2})
- Elevation: 292 ft (89 m)

Population (2020)
  - Total: 295
  - Density: 176.9/sq mi (68.32/km^{2})
- Time zone: UTC-6 (Central (CST))
  - Summer (DST): UTC-5 (CDT)
- ZIP code: 39759
- Area code: 662
- GNIS feature ID: 672857

Longview is a census-designated place (CDP) and unincorporated community located along Mississippi Highway 12 in Oktibbeha County, Mississippi. Longview is approximately 7 miles (11 km) southwest of Starkville and approximately 8 miles (13 km) northeast of Sturgis.

Per the 2020 Census, the population was 295.

== Demographics ==
Historical population
Census	Pop.	Note	%±
2020	295		—
U.S. Decennial Census; 2020

Longview was first listed as a census designated place in the 2020 U.S. census.

=== 2020 census ===
Longview CDP, Mississippi – Racial and ethnic composition Note: the US Census treats Hispanic/Latino as an ethnic category. This table excludes Latinos from the racial categories and assigns them to a separate category. Hispanics/Latinos may be of any race.
Race / Ethnicity (NH = Non-Hispanic)	Pop 2020	% 2020
White alone (NH)	258	87.46%
Black or African American alone (NH)	21	7.12%
Native American or Alaska Native alone (NH)	1	0.34%
Asian alone (NH)	0	0.00%
Native Hawaiian or Pacific Islander alone (NH)	0	0.00%
Other race alone (NH)	0	0.00%
Mixed race or Multiracial (NH)	13	4.41%
Hispanic or Latino (any race)	2	0.68%
Total	295	100.00%

== Education ==
It is in the Starkville-Oktibbeha Consolidated School District, which operates Starkville High School.

It was in the Starkville School District prior to the merger with Oktibehha County's district.

East Mississippi Community College is the community college of Oktibbeha County.
