= Helen Hayes (disambiguation) =

Helen Hayes (1900–1993) was an American actress.

Helen Hayes may also refer to:

- Helen Hayes (politician) (born 1974), British politician
- Helen Young Hayes (born 1962), American investment fund manager

== See also ==
- Helen Haye (1874–1957), English actress
- Helen Hayes Award, American theatre award established in 1983
- Helen Hays (1931–2025), American ornithologist
- Helen Haynes (active 1931–1932), American entertainer
