= Oktoc, Mississippi =

Coordinates: 33°19′56″N 88°45′28″W

- Unincorporated community
- Oktoc
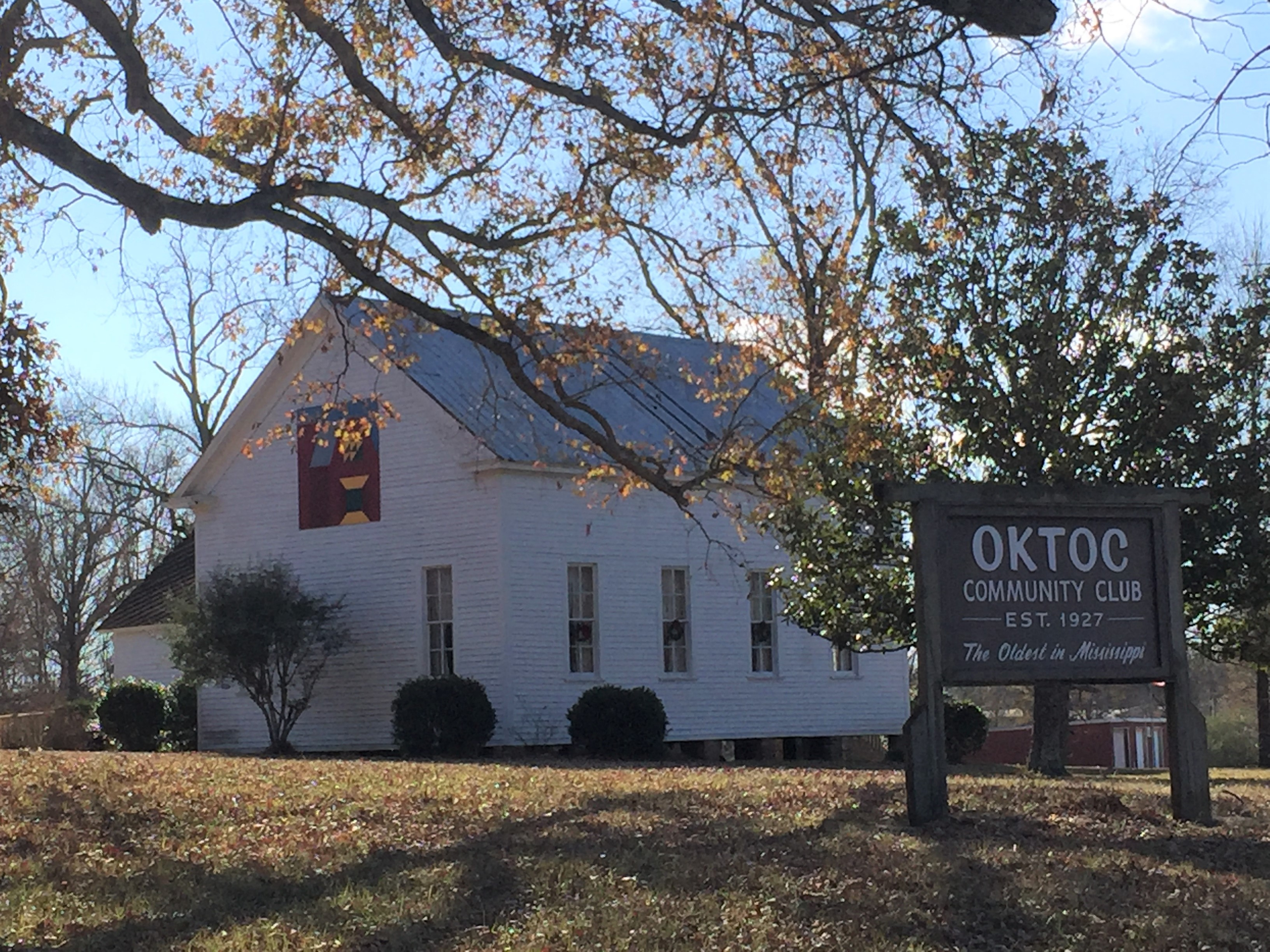
- The Oktoc Community Club in December, 2017
- Nickname: The Dairy Capital of the South
- Location within Mississippi Location within the United States
- Country: United States
- State: Mississippi
- County: Oktibbeha
- Time zone: UTC-6 (Central (CST))
  - Summer (DST): UTC-5 (CDT)
- Area code: 662

Oktoc is an unincorporated community in Oktibbeha County, Mississippi.

== History ==
The community's name derived from the Choctaw language purported to mean "prairie", perhaps via nearby Oktoc Creek. Oktoc is located on the former Robinson Road.

Once known as "The Dairy Capital of the South," Oktoc is now home to several defunct dairy farms including Oak Ayr and Mactoc Farms, the largest two in the community. Oktoc has the oldest community club in the state and has not missed a meeting since its beginning in 1927.

Oktoc was served by East Oktibbeha High School, which was formed by the consolidation of B.L. Moor High School and Alexander High School until it was merged with Starkville High School in 2015.

Today little remains but a community center and dilapidated country store.

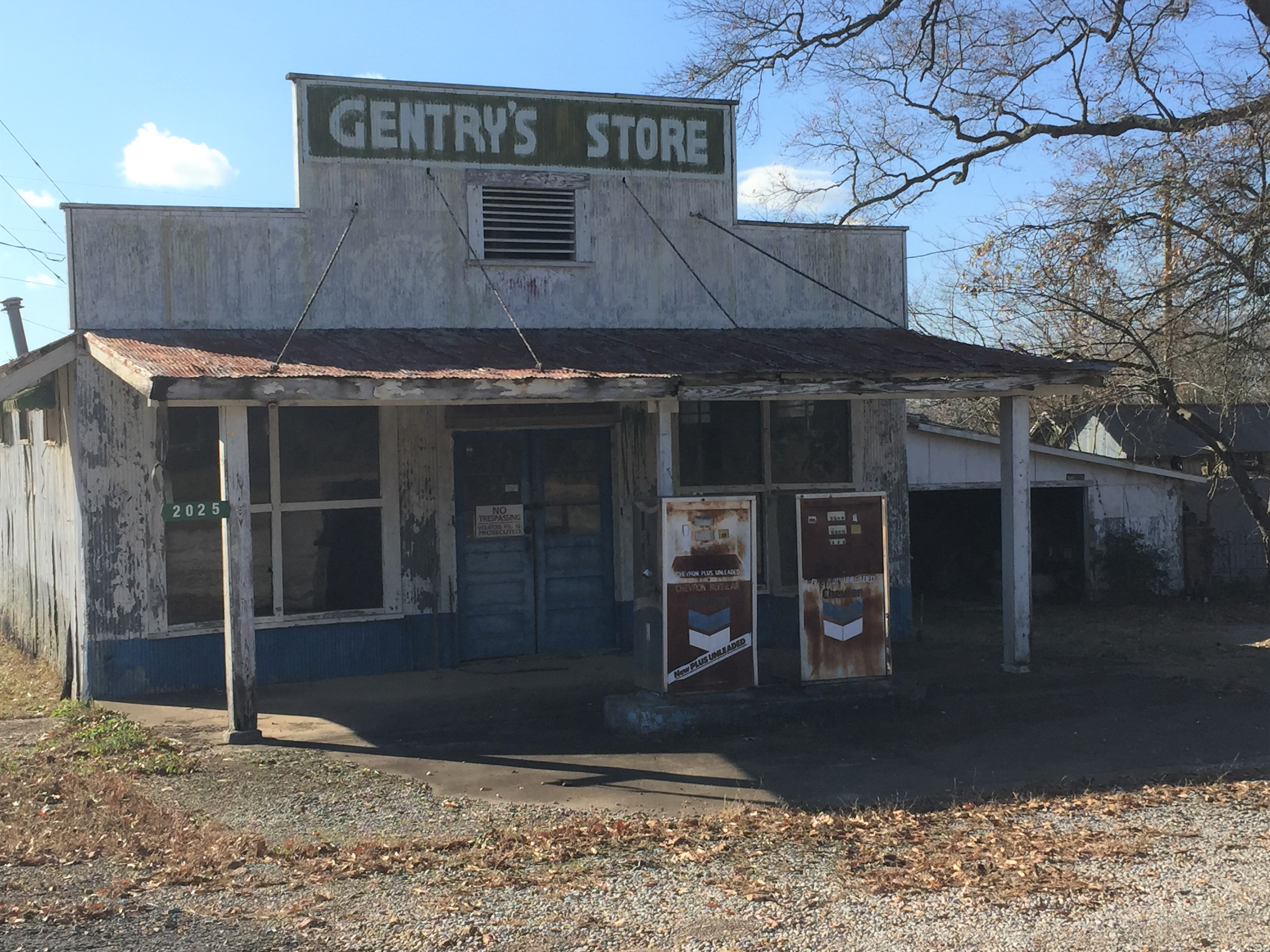
Gentry's store in 2017. For many years this was the only store in Oktoc, Mississippi

A post office operated under the name Oktoc from 1878 to 1913.

== Notable people ==
- James "Cool Papa" Bell, member of the National Baseball Hall of Fame
- Jerry Rice, NFL wide receiver and member of the Pro Football Hall of Fame. Attended high school in Oktoc.
