= Natrone Brooks =

American football player (born 1999)

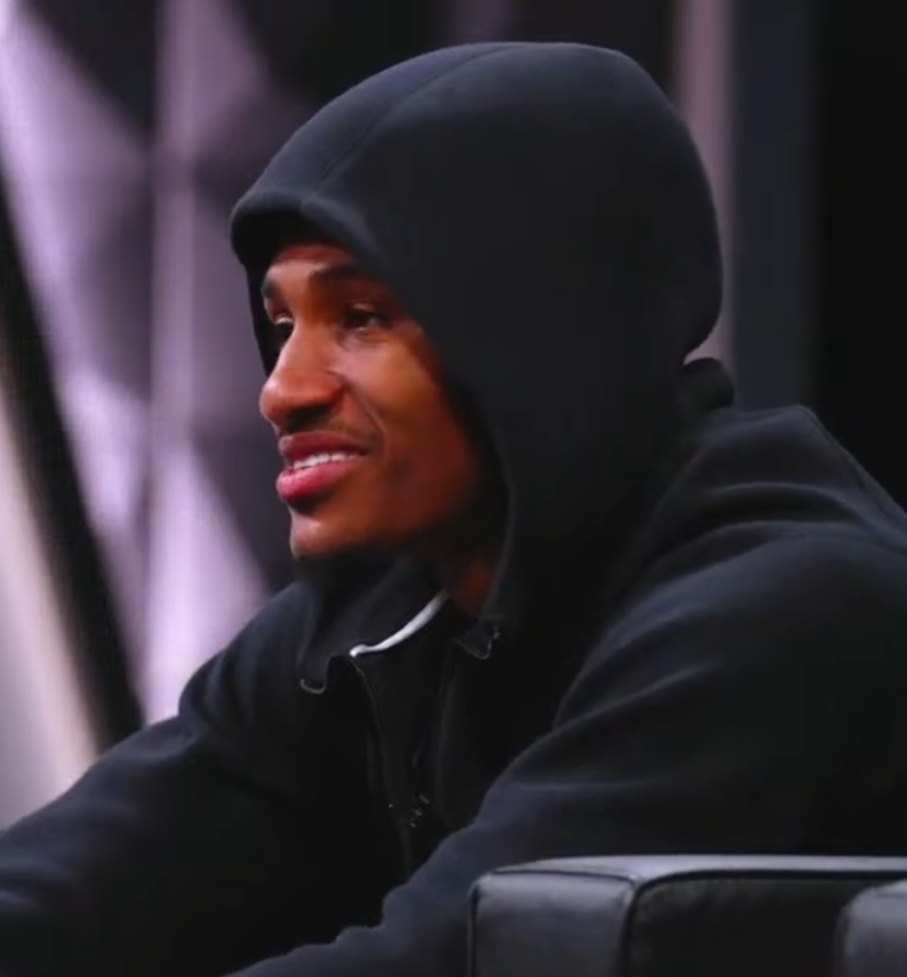
- Brooks in 2024

No. 40 – Indianapolis Colts
- Position: Cornerback
- Roster status: Practice squad

Personal information
- Born: December 11, 1999 (age 26); Starkville, Mississippi, U.S.
- Listed height: 5 ft 11 in (1.80 m)
- Listed weight: 175 lb (79 kg)

Career information
- High school: Starkville
- College: Copiah–Lincoln (2018–2019); Southern Miss (2020–2022)
- NFL draft: 2023: undrafted

Career history
- Atlanta Falcons (2023–2025); Detroit Lions (2026)*; Minnesota Vikings (2026)*; Indianapolis Colts (2026–present)*
- * Offseason or practice squad member only

Career NFL statistics as of 2025
- Total tackles: 15
- Pass deflections: 3
- Stats at Pro Football Reference

Natrone Brooks (born December 11, 1999) is an American professional football cornerback for the Indianapolis Colts of the National Football League (NFL). He played college football for the Southern Miss Golden Eagles.

== Early life ==
Brooks grew up in Starkville, Mississippi and attended Starkville High School. During his high school career, he played in 40 games where he recorded 136 total tackles (88 solo and 48 assisted), 13 tackles for loss, one sack and six interceptions. He was a three-star rated recruit and originally committed to play college football at the University of Memphis but would later commit to Copiah–Lincoln Community College.

== College career ==
=== Copiah–Lincoln CC ===
During Brooks' true freshman season in 2018, he recorded 24 total tackles (19 solo and five assisted), two interceptions and one tackle for loss. During the 2019 season, he played in nine games, finishing the season with 35 total tackles (26 solo and nine assisted), 5.5 tackles for loss and one fumble recovery.

Brooks announced that he would transfer to Southern Miss.

=== Southern Miss ===
During the 2020 season, he played in and started in all 10 games and was one of two defensive players to do so (the other way Tahj Sykes). He finished the season with 39 total tackles (25 solo and 14 assisted), 3.5 tackles for loss for seven yards, an interception and eight pass breakups. During the 2021 season, he played in 11 games and started three of them, finishing the season with 18 total tackles (11 solo and seven assisted), two tackles for loss for two yards, an interception and nine pass breakups. During the 2022 season, he played in and started all 13 games, finishing the season with 30 total tackles (18 solo and 12 assisted), 3.5 tackles for loss for eight yards, two interceptions, four pass breakups and a fumble recovery. He also added 18 punt returns for 222 yards.

== Professional career ==
Pre-draft measurables
Height	Weight	Arm length	Hand span	Wingspan	40-yard dash	10-yard split	20-yard split	20-yard shuttle	Three-cone drill	Vertical jump	Broad jump	Bench press
5 ft 10 1/8 in (1.78 m)	168 lb (76 kg)	31 in (0.79 m)	9 1/4 in (0.23 m)	6 ft 4 3/4 in (1.95 m)	4.73 s	1.65 s	2.72 s	4.47 s	7.06 s	30 in (0.76 m)	9 ft 10 in (3.00 m)	8 reps
All values from Pro Day

=== Atlanta Falcons ===
On May 15, 2023, Brooks was signed to the Atlanta Falcons as an undrafted free agent. He was waived by Atlanta on August 29, but was signed to the practice squad the next day. On September 9, Brooks was signed to the active roster but returned to the practice squad two days later. On January 6, 2024, he returned to the active roster and signed to a reserve/future contract two days later. He was waived by the Falcons on August 27, but was signed to the practice squad the next day. Brooks was promoted to the active roster on November 16.

On March 9, 2026, Brooks re-signed with the Falcons. He was waived by Atlanta on August 31.

=== Detroit Lions ===
On September 10, 2026, Brooks was signed to the Detroit Lions' practice squad. He was released on September 28.

=== Minnesota Vikings ===
On October 1, 2026, Brooks was signed to the Minnesota Vikings practice squad. On October 6, he was released from the practice squad. On October 20, he was re-signed to the practice squad. He was released once again four days later.

=== Indianapolis Colts ===
On October 27, 2026, Brooks signed with the Indianapolis Colts' practice squad.

== NFL career statistics ==
Legend
**Bold**	Career high

=== Regular season ===
Year	Team	Games		Tackles					Interceptions						Kick returns					Fumbles				
Year	Team	GP	GS	Cmb	Solo	Ast	Sck	TFL	Int	Yds	Avg	Lng	TD	PD	Ret	Yds	Avg	Lng	TD	FF	Fmb	FR	Yds	TD
2024	ATL	9	0	5	4	1	0.0	0	0	0	0.0	0	0	1	1	22	**22.0**	22	0	0	0	0	0	0
2025	ATL	17	1	**10**	**8**	**2**	0.0	0	0	0	0.0	0	0	**2**	**15**	**288**	19.2	**26**	0	0	**1**	0	0	0
Career		26	1	15	12	3	0.0	0	0	0	0.0	0	0	3	16	310	19.4	26	0	0	1	0	0	0
