= Tyrone Ellis (politician) =

American pastor and politician

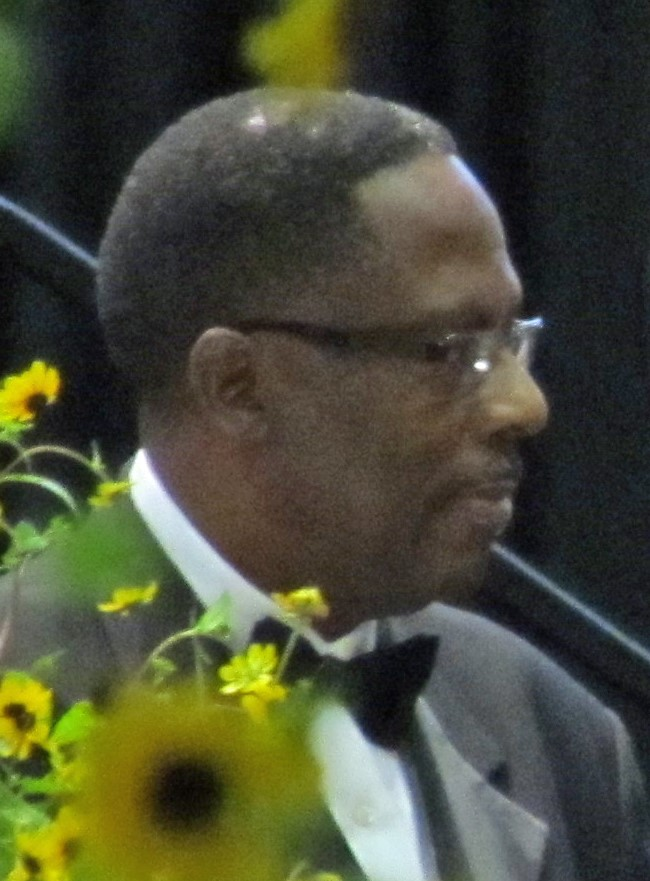

Member of the Mississippi House of Representatives from the 38th district
- In office January 1980 – 2017
- Preceded by: Reed Herring
- Succeeded by: Cheikh Taylor

Personal details
- Born: July 31, 1946 (age 79) Starkville, Mississippi, U.S.
- Party: Democratic

Tyrone Ellis (born July 31, 1946) is an American pastor and politician. He is a member of the Mississippi House of Representatives from the 38th District, being first elected in 1979. He is a member of the Democratic party.

He was a dairy farmer and general contractor.

In June 2017, Ellis announced his retirement from politics. He said he would continue serving as a pastor at the Running Water Baptist Church in Noxubee County, Mississippi.

== Personal life ==
Ellis attended Moor High School in Crawford, Mississippi.
