= Moor High School =

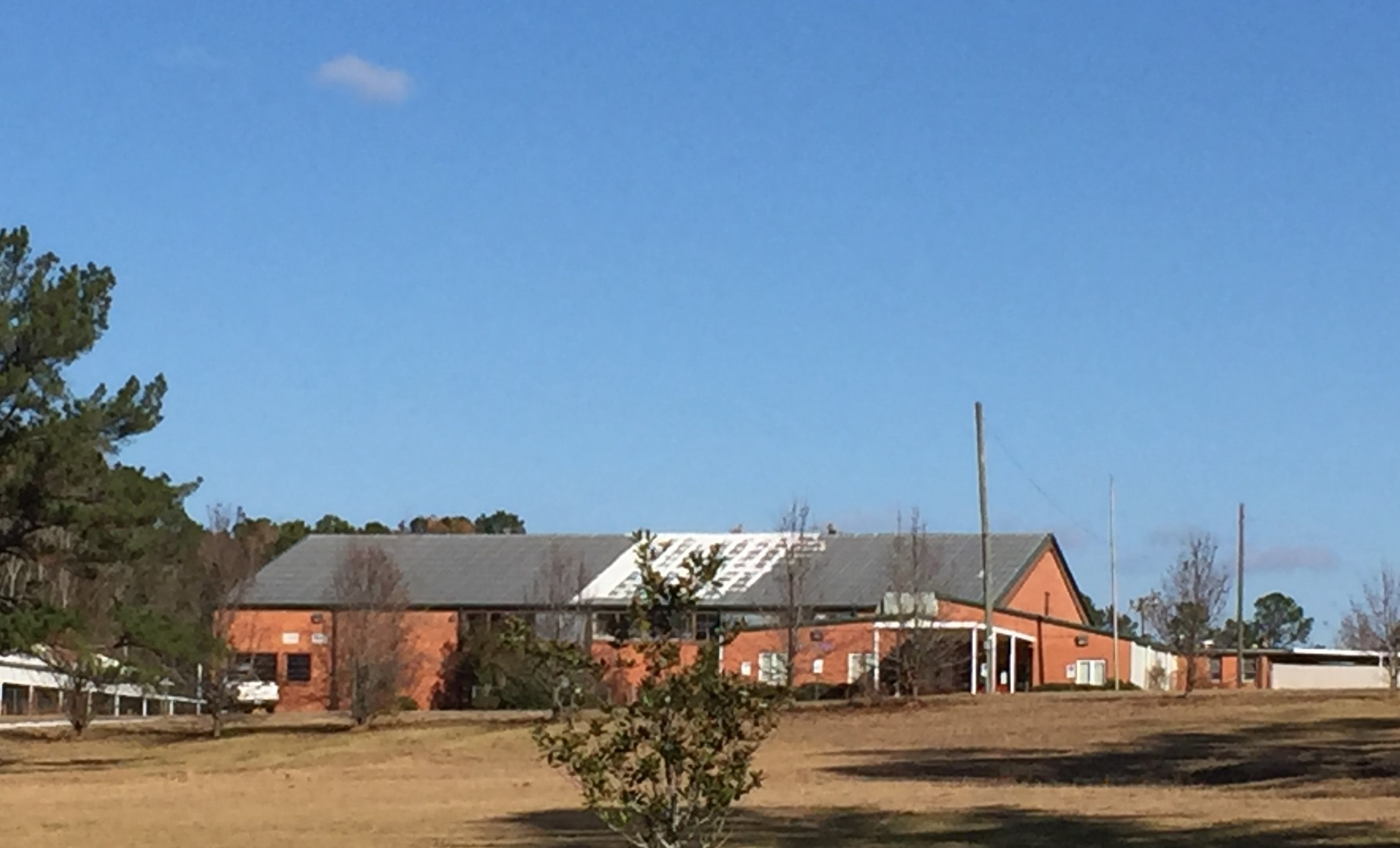
- The former B.L. Moor High School building in Oktoc, Mississippi

Location
- Oktoc, Mississippi; United States
- Coordinates: 33.3331°N 88.7128°W

Information
- Type: Public, segregated
- Opened: 1960
- Closed: 2002
- School district: Five
- Superintendent: Walter Conley
- Mascot: Eagles
- Nickname: Pleasant Grove
- Team name: Eagles

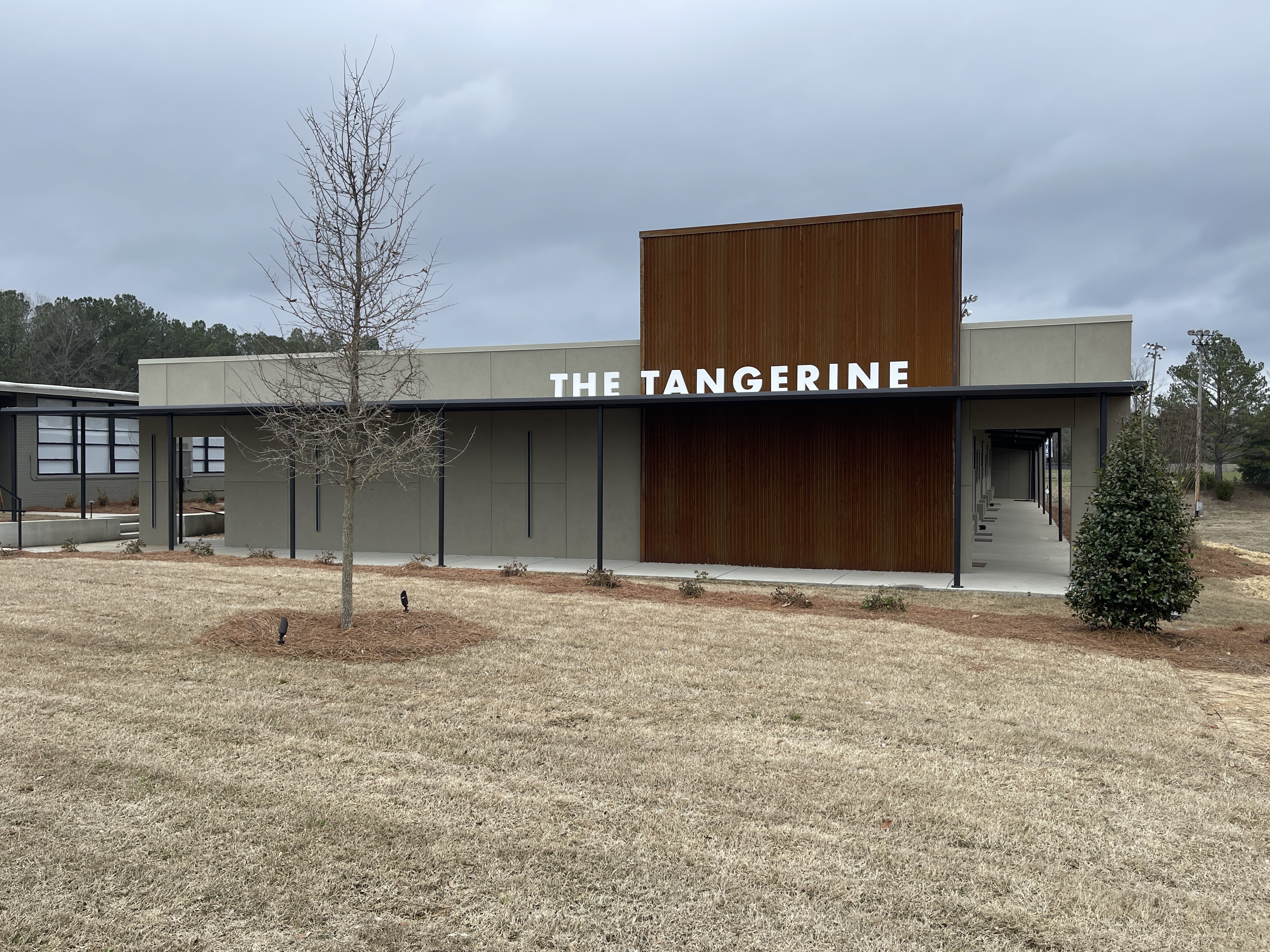
www.thetangerinemotel.com

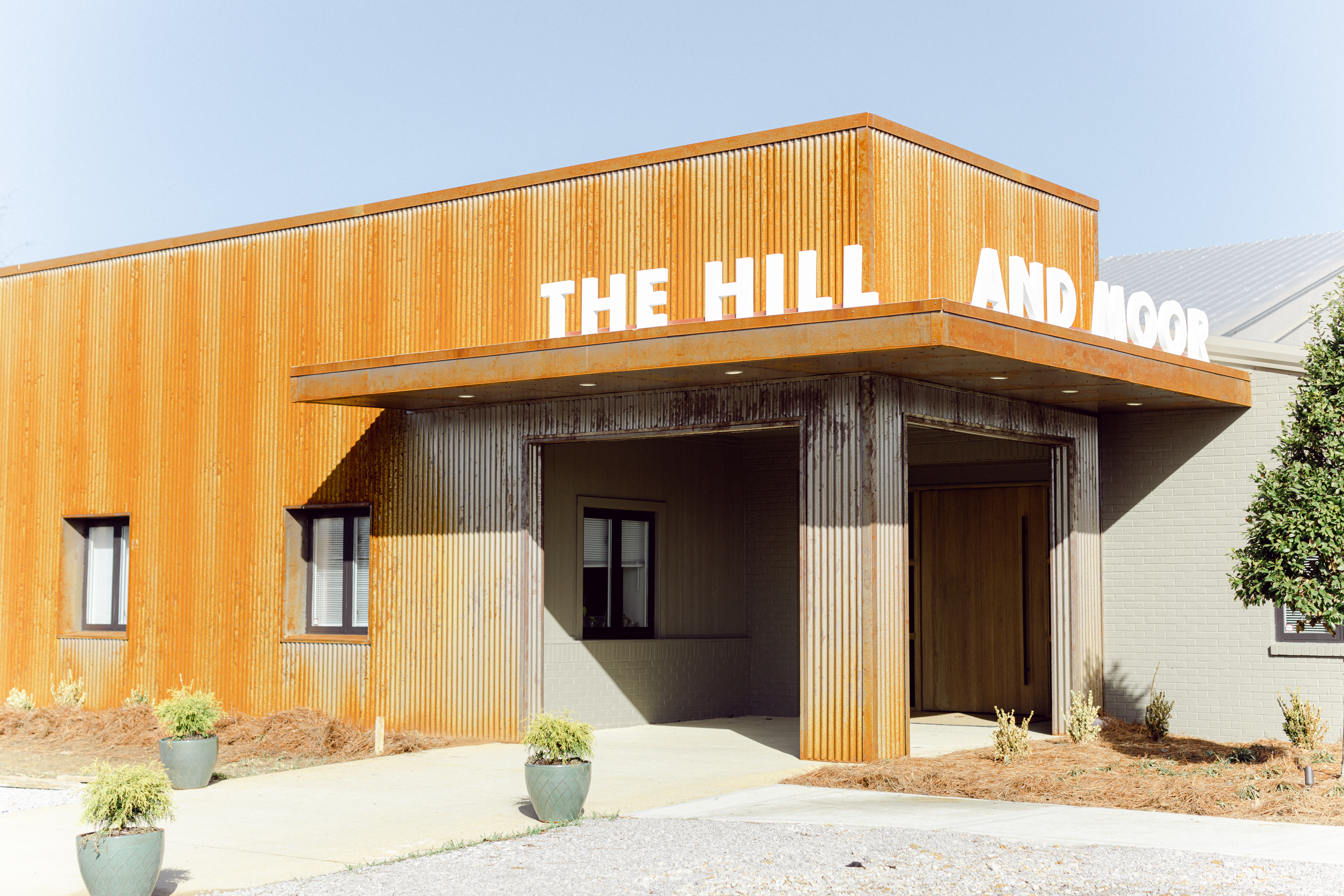

Moor High School was a historically black, public secondary school in Starkville, Mississippi. The school had roots in the Pleasant Grove Community School. In 2002, Moor was closed, then consolidated and merged with Alexander, another historically black high school in Starkville, Mississippi. The new school was housed at the Moor High location. In 2015 the state caused the Oktibbeha County School District to merge with the Starkville School District, and Moor was shuttered as a high school. The school district continued to use it for some time.

== History ==
Moor High was founded in 1960 as a segregated all-black school. In 1997 and 1998, proposals were made to reorganize the district, merging the two schools west of Starkville, Maben and Sturgis, into the Starkville Schools, while creating a new school district for the mostly Black schools (Alexander and Moor) on the east side of Starkville. After a fire burned the school in 2002, the school was merged with Alexander High school and was renamed East Oktibbeha County School. The Mississippi Legislature forced the Oktibbeha County School District to merge with the Starkville School District to become the Starkville Oktibbeha Consolidated School District. At that time, East Oktibbeha County School closed and all students were transferred to Starkville High School.

In 2016, the school site was abandoned.

In 2023, the school was re-purposed into a unique wedding venue and boutique motel, The Hill and Moor and The Tangerine Motel.

== Notable alumni ==
- Tyrone Ellis (1964), member of the Mississippi House of Representatives
- Jerry Rice (1981), NFL wide receiver, member of the Pro Football Hall of Fame
