= Carl Fair =

American football player (born 1979)

No. 42, 22
- Position: Running back

Personal information
- Born: June 8, 1979 (age 47); Starkville, Mississippi, U.S.
- Listed height: 6 ft 1 in (1.85 m)
- Listed weight: 219 lb (99 kg)

Career information
- High school: Starkville
- College: East Mississippi CC; UAB
- NFL draft: 2001: undrafted

Career history
- Cleveland Browns (2001–2002); Barcelona Dragons (2002)

Career NFL statistics
- Games played: 3
- Tackles: 1
- Stats at Pro Football Reference

Carl A. Fair (born June 8, 1979) is an American former professional football player who was a running back for one season in the National Football League (NFL) for the Cleveland Browns. He played college football at East Mississippi Community College as well as for the UAB Blazers. He also had a stint with the Barcelona Dragons in NFL Europe.

== Early life and education ==
Fair was born on June 8, 1979, in Starkville, Mississippi. He attended Starkville High School and helped them win a state championship in football. In 1996, he joined East Mississippi Community College (EMCC), where he spent three seasons. In 1998, he gained 697 yards, averaged about eight yards per-carry and averaged 31 yards per kick return in seven games with the school.

Fair was named one of the top junior college players by Jeff Whitaker's Deep South Recruiting Guide and received attention from several colleges. He was pursued most intensely by UAB, and accepted a scholarship with the school. "They were really pulling and pulling. You could tell they were real interested. UAB just seemed like the place for me to be," Fair said. He impressed in practice, showing "a knack for slcing through small openings in the line, then using his speed to run away from defenders." By October 7, Fair was fifth in the conference in rushing, following a 134-yard (Note: Listed as 138 yards in the 2012 UAB Football Information Guide.) rushing performance against Louisiana–Monroe.

Against the Cincinnati Bearcats on October 16, Fair suffered a season-ending broken fibula after being hit on a three-yard touchdown rush. He ended his season with 75 rushes for 405 yards, a 5.4 yard average. He was one of the top running backs in the Conference USA before his injury.

Fair entered his senior year (2000) as the UAB starting fullback. In his first game of the 2000 season, Fair left with an ankle injury, but was reported to be in "fair condition" afterwards. He finished the year with ten games played and 55 rush attempts for 211 yards.

== Professional career ==
After going unselected in the NFL draft, Fair was signed as an undrafted free agent by the Cleveland Browns on April 27, 2001. He was released on August 30. On September 4, he was signed to the Browns' practice squad. After an injury to top running back James Jackson, Fair was promoted to the active roster on December 21. He appeared in the final three games of the season: a 7–30 loss at the Green Bay Packers on December 23; a 41–38 win at the Tennessee Titans on December 30, in which Fair recorded one tackle on special teams; and a 7–28 loss at the Pittsburgh Steelers on January 6.

In 2002, Fair was sent to NFL Europe, where he played ten games, one as a starter, with the Barcelona Dragons. He recorded 76 rush attempts for 478 yards, which led the team, and scored two touchdowns while averaging 6.3 yards per-carry.

Fair was released by the Cleveland Browns on September 2, 2002. They were the last team of his career.
