= Jerry Rice =

American football player (born 1962)

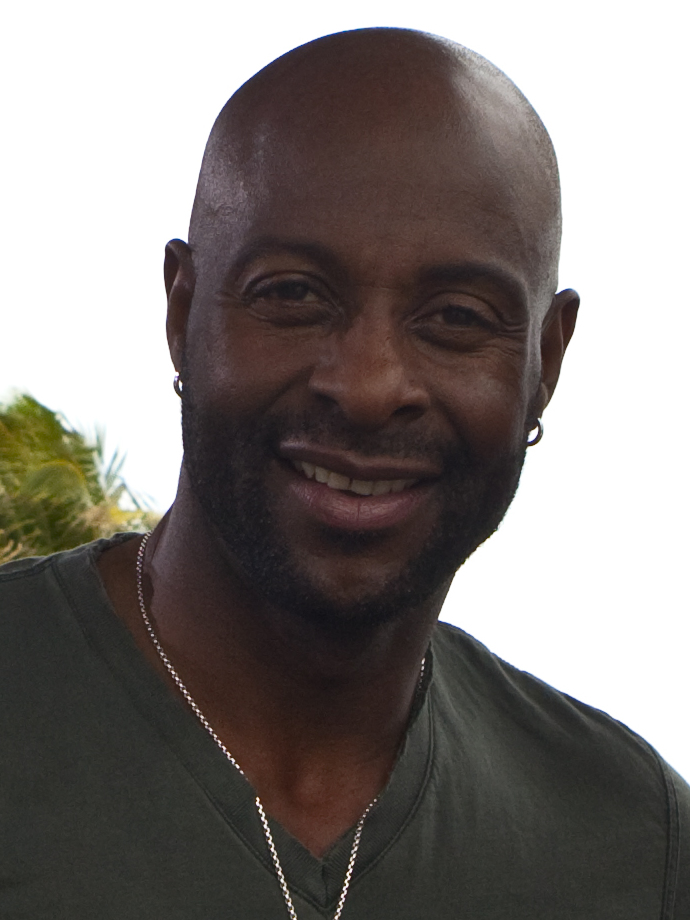
- Rice in 2010

No. 80
- Position: Wide receiver

Personal information
- Born: October 13, 1962 (age 64); Starkville, Mississippi, U.S.
- Listed height: 6 ft 2 in (1.88 m)
- Listed weight: 200 lb (91 kg)

Career information
- High school: B. L. Moor (Oktoc, Mississippi)
- College: Mississippi Valley State (1981–1984)
- NFL draft: 1985: 1st round, 16th overall pick

Career history
- San Francisco 49ers (1985–2000); Oakland Raiders (2001–2004); Seattle Seahawks (2004); Denver Broncos (2005)*
- * Offseason or practice squad member only

Awards and highlights
- 3× Super Bowl champion (XXIII, XXIV, XXIX); Super Bowl MVP (XXIII); 2× NFL Offensive Player of the Year (1987, 1993); 10× First-team All-Pro (1986–1990, 1992–1996); Second-team All-Pro (2002); 13× Pro Bowl (1986–1996, 1998, 2002); 2× NFL receptions leader (1990, 1996); 6× NFL receiving yards leader (1986, 1989, 1990, 1993–1995); 6× NFL receiving touchdowns leader (1986, 1987, 1989–1991, 1993); NFL scoring leader (1987); NFL 1980s All-Decade Team; NFL 1990s All-Decade Team; NFL 75th Anniversary All-Time Team; NFL 100th Anniversary All-Time Team; Bert Bell Award (1987); PFWA NFL MVP (1987); PFWA All-Rookie Team (1985); San Francisco 49ers Hall of Fame; San Francisco 49ers No. 80 retired; 2× First-team I-AA All-American (1983, 1984); Mississippi Valley State Delta Devils No. 88 retired; NFL records: Career receptions: 1,549; Career receiving yards: 22,895; Career receiving yards in the playoffs: 2,245; Games with 100+ receiving yards: 76; Career receiving touchdowns: 197; Career receiving touchdowns in the playoffs: 22; Career total touchdowns: 208; Career total touchdowns in the playoffs: 22; Career all-purpose yards: 23,546; Career all-purpose yards in the playoffs: 2,289; Most career Super Bowl receptions: 33

Career NFL statistics
- Receptions: 1,549
- Receiving yards: 22,895
- Receiving touchdowns: 197
- Stats at Pro Football Reference
- Pro Football Hall of Fame
- College Football Hall of Fame

Jerry Lee Rice (born October 13, 1962) is an American former professional football wide receiver who played for 20 seasons in the National Football League (NFL). He won three Super Bowl titles with the San Francisco 49ers before two shorter stints at the end of his career with the Oakland Raiders and Seattle Seahawks. For his accomplishments and numerous records, Rice is widely regarded as the greatest wide receiver of all time and one of the greatest players in NFL history. His biography on the official Pro Football Hall of Fame website names him "the most prolific wide receiver in NFL history with staggering career totals". In 1999, The Sporting News listed Rice second behind Jim Brown on its list of "Football's 100 Greatest Players". In 2010, he was chosen by NFL Network's NFL Films production The Top 100: NFL's Greatest Players as the greatest player in NFL history.

Rice played college football for four seasons with the Mississippi Valley State Delta Devils, setting several National Collegiate Athletic Association (NCAA) and team receiving records, including becoming the all-time leader in NCAA receiving touchdowns. He joined the 49ers after being selected with the 16th overall pick of the 1985 NFL draft. After a modest rookie season, Rice emerged in the following season as one of the best receivers in the league, leading the NFL in receiving yards and touchdowns, a feat he achieved six times. In 1987, Rice set the record for most receiving touchdowns in a season, with 22, in a twelve-game strike-shortened season. He won back-to-back championships in 1988 and 1989, and was the MVP of the former championship. Rice developed connections with quarterbacks Joe Montana and Steve Young that are viewed as among the best in NFL history, helping him lead the league in both receiving yards and touchdowns six times, and in receptions twice.

Going into the 1990s, Rice won a third Super Bowl in 1994, and a second Offensive Player of the Year Award. After recovering from a knee injury and his play regressing, San Francisco released him in June 2001, where the Raiders would sign him to a four-year deal. He continued to start for the team, and helped lead them to an appearance in Super Bowl XXXVII, where they were defeated by the Tampa Bay Buccaneers, affecting Rice's previously unblemished Super Bowl record. Midway through 2004, the Raiders traded him to the Seahawks, where he spent his final season. He briefly signed with the Broncos, retiring shortly before the start of the 2005 regular season.

Rice is the career leader in most major statistical categories for wide receivers, including receptions, receiving touchdowns, receiving yards, scrimmage yards, and total touchdowns, holding the postseason records for these statistics, and once held the single-season records for yards and touchdowns. He scored more points than any other non-kicker in NFL history with 1,256. Rice was selected to the Pro Bowl 13 times (1986–1996, 1998, 2002) and named All-Pro twelve times in his 20 NFL seasons, including ten First-team All-Pros, tied for the most by any player. Rice was inducted into the Pro Football Hall of Fame in 2010 and the College Football Hall of Fame in 2006. Rice was inducted into the Mississippi Sports Hall of Fame in 2007, and in the same year was inducted into the Bay Area Sports Hall of Fame. The NFL honored him as a member of the NFL 1980s All-Decade Team and the NFL 1990s All-Decade Team, as well as both the NFL 75th Anniversary All-Time Team and NFL 100th Anniversary All-Time Team.

== Early life ==
Jerry Lee Rice Sr. was born on October 13, 1962, in Starkville, Mississippi, and grew up in Crawford, Mississippi, the sixth of eight children. Crawford was a small town, having only 600 residents. Rice's father, Joe, was a brick mason who built houses by hand, while holding other jobs to provide for the family. Joe was described by Rice as "a tough man" and held him and his siblings to a strict lifestyle. Eddie B., Rice's mother, raised Rice while Joe was working, and after Rice left cleaned the houses of wealthy families. Rice and his brothers often worked with their father building houses, catching bricks on top of scaffolds to make sure his father had bricks to lay. He did not see bricklaying as being his future saying that "it taught me the meaning of hard work." The Rice family struggled financially, with Rice sometimes not having many pairs of clothing or having a "hearty meal on the table". Providing for his family, he and his brothers picked corn, cotton, carrots, and hay. Rice asserted that he was shy as a child and did not have many friends.

Rice attended B. L. Moor High School in Oktoc, Mississippi. Although he played mock games of basketball and football, Rice did not initially play sports for his high school. He enjoyed playing sandlot football and watching football on television. His mother forbade him to join the school's football team in his freshman year, as she thought that football was "too rough" for Rice. During Rice's sophomore year, the school's assistant principal caught him skipping class with a friend, causing him to panic and sprint away. After Rice fled, the principal was impressed with his speed, and informed the school's football coach, Charles Davis, who offered Rice a place on the team. Initially unhappy about this, Rice's mother relented after realizing that "the more I fought it, the more determined he was, so I gave it up."

Rice played multiple positions in high school, including running back, defensive back and tight end, but the position he was most skilled at was wide receiver. During the offseason before his junior year, he trained for the team by running the several miles back to his home as he did not have a ride. Rice had a breakout junior season, primarily playing wide receiver and defensive back. In his senior year, Rice was a Mississippi All-State selection at wide receiver.

Due to the small size of Moor, few of his statistics were officially recorded. According to sports journalist Glenn Dickey, Rice caught 50 receptions and 30 touchdowns as a senior, helping to lead the team to a 17–2 record over his final two seasons. He and Moor's starting quarterback, Willie Gillespie, were very dependable, enough for them to be nicknamed Johnny Unitas and Raymond Berry. In addition to football, Rice also played basketball as a forward and participated on the track and field team, competing in the high jump.

Rice received over 40 contacts from NCAA Division I-A schools; his preference was to attend Mississippi State University, but they did not offer him an athletic scholarship. He was drawn to Mississippi Valley State, in part because the school's coach, Archie Cooley, ran a pass-heavy offense—enough that Cooley was nicknamed "The Gunslinger." After Cooley watched Rice play in person and after he visited the school's campus, Rice committed to playing at Mississippi Valley State.

== College career ==
Rice attended Mississippi Valley State University from 1981 to 1984. When Rice arrived at Mississippi Valley State, he attended summer school and freshman orientation before the regular season. Two of his former teammates from B.L. Moor were there as well, but both left before the start of training camp. Rice studied receiving techniques from Gloster Richardson, stating: "I soaked up everything I could."

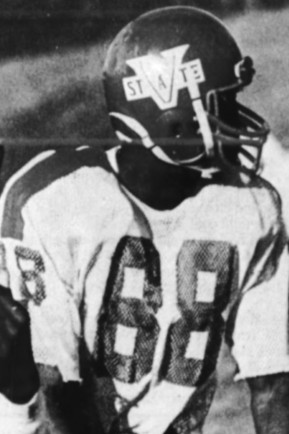
Rice with the Mississippi Valley State Delta Devils in 1983

In 1981, Rice's freshman season, he caught 30 passes for 428 yards and two touchdowns. In 1982, his sophomore year, Rice played his first season with freshman quarterback Willie Totten. They became friends and practiced into the evening. Under the direction of Cooley, Mississippi Valley State ran an "unusual" offense, playing four wide receivers who tended to line up on one side of the field. Rice caught 66 passes for 1,133 yards and seven touchdowns. Together, Totten and Rice became known as "The Satellite Express." Success on the field did not put any money in his pocket, and many times he relied on friends for food, stating that the food given to him at Mississippi Valley "were not enough for a growing man". Rice had a record-setting 1983 campaign, including NCAA marks for receptions (102) and receiving yards (1,450). He was named a first-team Division I-AA All-American. He set a single-game NCAA record with 24 receptions against Southern University. He acquired the nickname "World," because of his ability to seemingly catch anything thrown near him.

After an August practice experiment, Cooley had Totten call all the plays at the line of scrimmage without a huddle, resulting in even more staggering offensive numbers. Rice caught 17 receptions for 199 yards against Southern, 17 receptions for 294 yards, and five receiving touchdowns against Kentucky State, and 15 for 285 yards against Jackson State. During the game against Kentucky State, Rice caught twelve passes and scored three touchdowns in a single quarter. As a senior in 1984, he surpassed his own Division I-AA records for receiving yards (1,845), and receptions (112); his 27 touchdown receptions in the 1984 season set the NCAA record for every division. The 1984 Delta Devils averaged more than 60 points per game. Rice was named to the Division I-AA All-American team and finished ninth in Heisman Trophy balloting in 1984.

In the Blue–Gray Classic all-star game played on Christmas Day, he earned MVP honors after four receptions for 101 yards and a 60-yard touchdown. He finished his career with 301 catches for 4,693 yards and 50 touchdowns, (although some sources have his numbers as 310 receptions, 4,856 receiving yards, and 51 touchdowns); his NCAA record for total career touchdown receptions stood until 2006 when New Hampshire wide receiver David Ball recorded his 51st career receiving touchdown. Rice's all-division NCAA record for total career receptions stood until 1999 when Scott Pingel of Division III Westminster logged his 302nd career reception. By the end of his college career, he had broken 18 NCAA records. In 1999, the school renamed its football stadium from Magnolia Stadium to Rice–Totten Stadium in honor of the players. Rice was inducted into the College Football Hall of Fame in 2006, and was in the inaugural class of the Black College Football Hall of Fame in 2010.

During his college years, Rice became a member of the Phi Beta Sigma fraternity and met his future wife Jackie Mitchell at an MVS basketball game. When they first met, Mitchell was a high school student, and they dated casually before Rice met her mother. Her mother was initially unhappy about Rice and preferred that Mitchell see another boy that lived in Greenville, Mississippi, but after meeting Rice in person she approved of him.

== Professional career ==
=== San Francisco 49ers (1985–2000) ===
Rice's record-breaking season at Mississippi Valley State caught the attention of NFL scouts. Sources vary on his 40-yard dash time, which was measured between 4.45 and 4.71 seconds. Both the Dallas Cowboys and San Francisco 49ers showed interest in him. San Francisco had won two out of the previous four Super Bowls prior to the draft. Rice later wrote in Go Long! that he was unsure about what success he might have in the league, and that he would "often play head games" with himself; his backup plan if his football career didn't pan out was fixing electronics. In a 2022 interview with Fox News Digital, Rice expressed his doubts about being drafted at the time: "To be honest, I never thought I was going to get drafted, I downplayed everything because I didn't want that disappointment of getting up here and then come down in disappointment if it didn't happen".

In the first round of the 1985 NFL draft, Dallas had the No. 17 selection and San Francisco, as Super Bowl champion from the previous season, had the last. 49ers coach Bill Walsh sought Rice after seeing television highlights of his college performances. Walsh "saw the deep-threat the 49ers lacked ... a player who could break open a game with one play." The 49ers traded their first, second, and third-round picks for the New England Patriots' first and third-round picks. The 49ers had the No. 16 selection overall and drafted Rice before the Cowboys had a chance. Walsh described Rice as "a swift, smooth player who's got great instincts running with the ball, going to the ball and catching in a crowd." Rice was selected by the United States Football League (USFL), where the Birmingham Stallions selected him with the No. 1 overall pick of the 1985 USFL draft, but the league folded after its 1986 season. In training camp, Rice had to compete with 49ers Dwight Clark and Freddie Solomon for roster spots at the wide receiver position.

==== Joe Montana and first two Super Bowls (1985–1989) ====
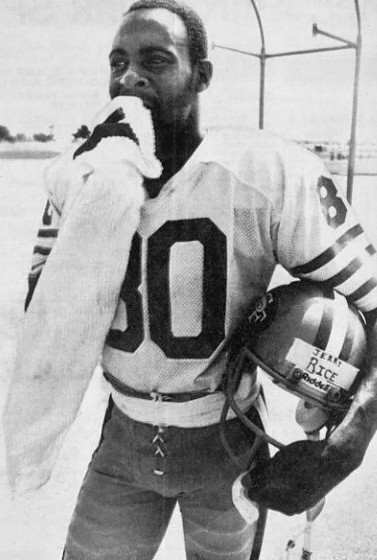
Rice at 49ers training camp in 1985

In July 1985, Rice was one of 21 rookie players who had not yet signed a contract. Rice signed a rookie contract for five years that paid him $377,000 per year. He wrote that during training camp, he was nicknamed "Fifi" because of his haircut, but he was praised by his teammates for his work ethic. It was with the 49ers where Rice switched from his college number, 88 (which was already taken by teammate Freddie Solomon), to his now famous #80 (in honor of his idol, Steve Largent). Rice made his NFL debut in the 49ers' regular season opener against the Minnesota Vikings. He had four receptions for 67 yards in the 28–21 loss. Rice scored his first receiving touchdown against the Atlanta Falcons on a 25-yard reception from Joe Montana in Week 5. Rice had a breakout game with ten receptions for a then franchise-record 241 yards against the Los Angeles Rams in Week 13, his first over 100 receiving yards, with San Francisco losing 27–20. For his game against the Rams, Rice earned NFC Offensive Player of the Week. After a seven reception, 111-yard performance in a 31–16 victory in the regular season finale against the Dallas Cowboys, while scoring a rushing touchdown, CBS announcer Pat Summerall stated that "When this guy [Rice] is finished [retires], he'll be considered one of the greatest wide receivers to ever play this game." He recorded 49 catches, for 927 yards, and three receiving touchdowns, averaging 18.9 yards per catch in his rookie season, and started four out of sixteen possible games. United Press International (UPI) named Rice the NFC Offensive Rookie of the Year, and he was selected to the PFWA All-Rookie Team. Nevertheless, Rice struggled, dropping numerous passes that season. In a game against the Kansas City Chiefs, Rice dropped two wide-open passes and later fumbled on an 8-yard pass that was intended to boost Rice's confidence. Rice said that his poor play may have been impacted by his increased wealth and the distractions that came with it. The 49ers finished the regular season with a 10–6 record and made the postseason. During the Wild Card Round against the New York Giants, Rice had four receptions for 44 yards in the 17–3 loss.

During the 1986 off-season, Rice spent much of his time studying the 49ers playbook. Playing against the Los Angeles Rams, Rice had six receptions for 157 yards and a touchdown in a Week 2 loss. He followed that with a seven reception, 120-yard game against the New Orleans Saints in a 26–17 victory in Week 3. Following a two-touchdown game against the Miami Dolphins in Week 4, Rice had six receptions for 172 yards and three touchdowns in a 35–14 victory over the Indianapolis Colts. In Week 10, against the St. Louis Cardinals, he had four receptions for 156 receiving yards and three touchdowns in the 43–17 victory. Rice had his second career 200-yard receiving game against the Washington Redskins, having a 12 reception, 204-yard performance in Week 11. For his game against Washington, he won NFC Offensive Player of the Week. He won NFC Offensive Player of the Month for November. Overall, he caught 86 passes for 1,570 yards and 15 touchdowns, both of which led the league, the first of four seasons in which Rice led the NFL in both receiving yards and touchdown receptions. He was named to the Pro Bowl and First-team All-Pro teams. The 49ers finished the regular season with a 10–5–1 record, won the NFC West, and made the postseason. Rice struggled in the Divisional Round against the eventual Super Bowl-winning Giants, fumbling what would have been a long touchdown on the game's first drive. The 49ers lost 49–3.

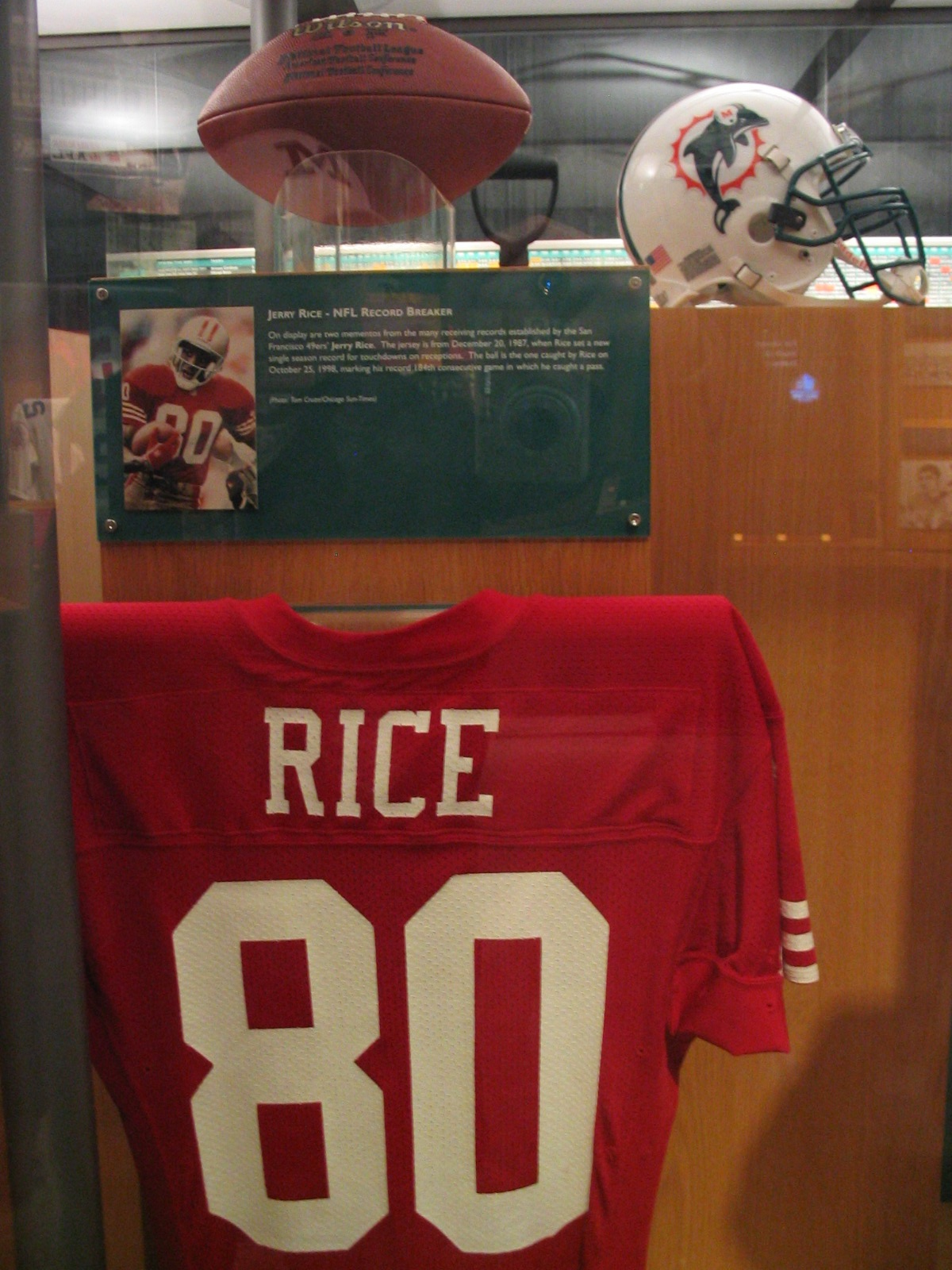
Rice's No. 80 jersey from December 1987, when he set an NFL record for receiving touchdowns with the 49ers

In the first game of the 1987 season, against the Pittsburgh Steelers, Rice went for eight receptions and 108 yards with a touchdown in a 30–17 loss. The following week against the Cincinnati Bengals, Rice recorded four receptions for 86 yards and two touchdowns in a 27–26 victory. The NFL Players Association began a strike after the season's second game, causing Rice to miss the next four games while backups replaced him (including a canceled game). He picketed outside the 49ers practice facility while some of his teammates (including quarterback Joe Montana and halfback Roger Craig), crossed picket lines to play. When the strike ended, Rice resumed playing in Week 7. In Week 10, against the New Orleans Saints, he had four receptions for 108 yards and two touchdowns in the 26–24 loss. In the following game, a 24–10 victory over the Tampa Bay Buccaneers, he had seven receptions for 103 yards and three receiving touchdowns in the 24–10 victory. His continued his productive streak with seven receptions for 126 yards and three touchdowns in a 38–24 victory over the Cleveland Browns in the following game. For his game against the Browns, he won NFC Offensive Player of the Week. Two weeks later, in Week 14, Rice recorded three receiving touchdowns for the third time in four games in a 41–0 victory over the Chicago Bears. In the final two games of the regular season, Rice recorded four total receiving touchdowns. Rice scored a receiving touchdown in every game he played that season. In total, he scored 22 receiving touchdowns in 12 games, coupled with 1,078 receiving yards from 65 receptions. His touchdown number broke a then-NFL-record previously held by Mark Clayton (18), which Rice officially broke against the Atlanta Falcons in Week 15. The record was broken by Randy Moss in 2007, when he scored 23 receiving touchdowns. After being selected to the Pro Bowl and First-team All-Pro teams, Rice was awarded the NFL Offensive Player of the Year Award, becoming the first wide receiver to receive the award. He was also named the NFLs MVP by the Newspaper Enterprise Association. In 1987, the touchdown runner-up was receiver Mike Quick with 11, marking the first time in post-NFL–AFL merger history that a category leader doubled the total of his nearest competitor and the second time in the history of the NFL from its inception; the first being Don Hutson in 1942. The 49ers finished the season 13–2, the best record in the NFL, but lost in the Divisional Playoffs to the Minnesota Vikings 36–24, with Rice having three receptions for 28 yards.

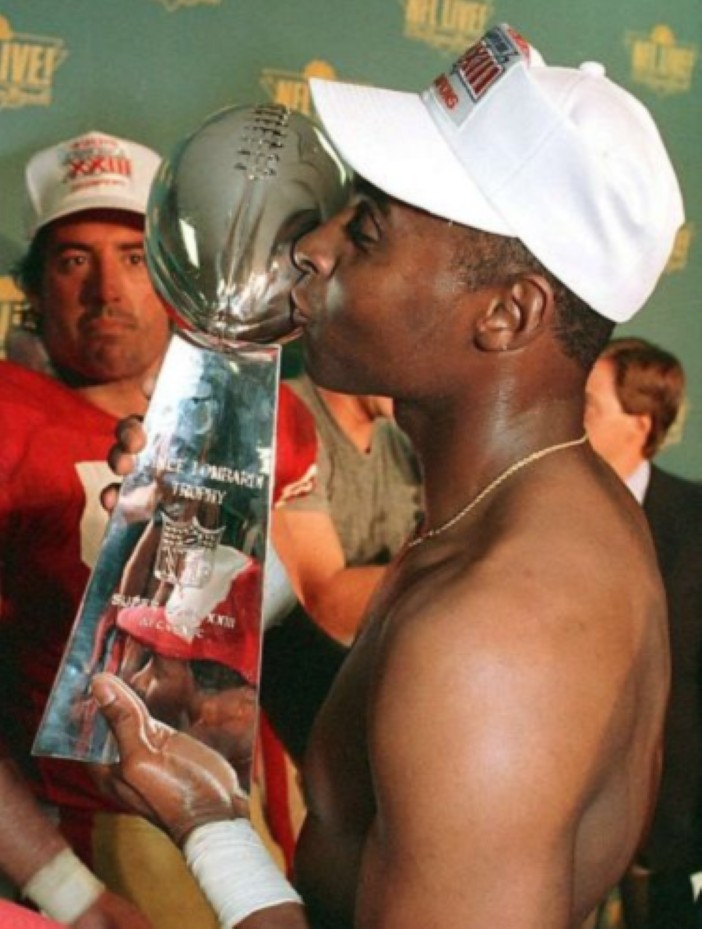
Rice kisses the Vince Lombardi Trophy on January 22, 1989

Before the 1988 season, Rice signed a five-year, $5.05 million contract in June that kept him with the 49ers through 1992. He was plagued by an ankle injury throughout the season, In Week 3, Rice had eight receptions for 163 yards in a loss to the Atlanta Falcons. In the following game, he recorded 163 receiving yards once again and had three touchdowns in a 38–7 victory over the Seattle Seahawks. In Week 13, he had six receptions for 171 receiving yards and two receiving touchdowns in a 48–10 victory over the San Diego Chargers, including a career long 96 yard touchdown. He won NFC Offensive Player of the Week for his game against the Chargers. He still put up high numbers in the games he played, finishing the season with 64 receptions for 1,306 yards and nine receiving touchdowns, averaging a career-high 20.4 yards per reception, earning him more selections to the Pro Bowl and First-team All-Pro teams. The 49ers won the NFC West with a 10–6 record. Rice had five receptions for 61 yards and three touchdowns, scoring all three in the first half of the 49ers' 34–9 win against the Vikings during the Divisional Round. In the 49ers' 28–3 win over the Chicago Bears in the NFC Championship, he had five receptions for 133 yards and two touchdowns. In Super Bowl XXIII, Rice had an 11 reception, 215-yard performance with a touchdown, helping the 49ers to a narrow 20–16 win over the Cincinnati Bengals. Both his receptions and receiving yards were Super Bowl records. For his performance, Rice was named the Super Bowl MVP; he called the win "stupendous". He became the third wide receiver to earn Super Bowl MVP honors. Even though Rice won the MVP, Montana uttered the famous: "I'm going to Disney World!" line, instead of Rice; Rice attributed him not saying it to racism. Overall, Rice caught 21 receptions for 409 yards and six touchdowns; his yards and touchdown numbers stood as postseason records until Larry Fitzgerald broke both of them in 2008.

After the 1988 season, 49ers head coach Bill Walsh retired from coaching after much speculation, and was to be replaced by George Seifert; Rice was saddened by this, referring to Walsh his "West Coast father". Rice started off the season strong with six receptions for 163 receiving yards and one receiving touchdown in a 30–24 victory over the Indianapolis Colts. In the following game, against the Tampa Bay Buccaneers, he had eight receptions for 122 receiving yards in the 20–16 victory. In the next game, a 38–28 victory over the Philadelphia Eagles, he had a season-high 164 receiving yards on six receptions for two touchdowns. Two weeks later, he had seven receptions for 149 receiving yards and a touchdown in a 24–20 victory over the New Orleans Saints in Week 5. Starting in Week 7, Rice had a six-game stretch where he had three games with two receiving touchdowns and three games going over the 100-yard mark. By the end of the 1989 season, Rice had gained 82 receptions for 1,483 yards and 17 receiving touchdowns; both his yards and touchdown numbers led the league. For the fourth straight season, Rice was selected to the Pro Bowl and First-team All-Pro team. San Francisco finished the regular season with a 14–2 record, the league's best. Rice had six receptions for 114 yards and two touchdowns in the Divisional Round against the Minnesota Vikings; the 49ers won 41–13. In the NFC Championship against the Los Angeles Rams, he had six receptions for 55 yards in the 30–3 victory. Rice finished Super Bowl XXIV with seven receptions for 148 yards and three touchdowns in the 49ers 55–10 blowout victory against the Denver Broncos.

==== Steve Young and third Super Bowl (1990–1994) ====
In the 1990 season, Rice started all 16 games. In Week 3, against the Atlanta Falcons, he had eight receptions for 171 yards and a touchdown in the 19–13 victory. For his game against the Falcons, he won NFC Offensive Player of the Week. On October 14, in Week 6 against the Falcons, Rice caught a career-best five touchdowns to go with 13 receptions for 225 yards in the 45–35 victory. For the second time and against the same opponent in the 1990 season, Rice won NFC Offensive Player of the Week. On November 4, against the Green Bay Packers, Rice had a six reception, 181-yard performance with a touchdown. In the following game, against the Dallas Cowboys, he had 12 receptions for 147 yards and one touchdown in the 24–6 victory. In three of the last four games of the regular season, Rice went over 100 receiving yards. Rice had a successful year, leading the NFL in receptions (100), receiving yards (1,502), and receiving touchdowns (13), becoming the first player to lead the NFL in all three categories in the Super Bowl era: only Sterling Sharpe (1992), Steve Smith Sr. (2005), Cooper Kupp (2021), and Ja'Marr Chase (2024) have managed the feat since. He was named to the Pro Bowl and First-team All-Pro teams. Rice's efforts helped San Francisco finish the year with an NFL-best 14–2 record. During the Divisional Round against the Redskins, Rice had six receptions for 68 yards and a touchdown in the 28–10 victory. Montana injured his elbow in the NFC Championship against the New York Giants, ending with the 49ers losing 15–13, failing to repeat as NFC champions for a third time; Rice went for five receptions and 54 yards in the game.

In 1991, Montana was ruled out for the season with an injury, making Steve Young the starting quarterback. Along with Montana, teammates Ronnie Lott and Roger Craig had left in free agency, making Rice "the last of the Mohicans" as he described himself, the only remaining star player from San Francisco's 80s dynasty. Rice started the season with six receiving touchdowns in the first four games, which included a 150-yard game against the San Diego Chargers in Week 2. In Week 7, against the Atlanta Falcons, he had seven receptions for 138 yards and one touchdown in the 39–34 loss. Rice recorded 80 receptions for 1,206 yards and led the league in receiving touchdowns with 14 in the 1991 season, and was again selected to the Pro Bowl. He suffered a torn posterior cruciate ligament (PCL) against the Vikings, but the injury did not cost him any games. San Francisco managed to win their final six games to finish with a 10–6 record but they failed to make the postseason, marking the first time in Rice's career that the 49ers failed to do so.

During the 1992 season, a quarterback controversy swirled around Montana and Young. Rice openly supported Montana, but Young ended up starting, while Montana rehabbed. Wanting a high-value contract, Rice skipped training camp. He eventually signed with the 49ers for a three-year, $7.5 million contract, returning to training camp. On September 13, Rice was knocked unconscious against the Buffalo Bills, and was taken out of the game with a concussion. In Week 7, against the Falcons, Rice had a seven reception, 183-yard performance with two touchdowns to go along with a 26-yard touchdown rush, totaling 209 scrimmage yards in the 56–17 victory. He won NFC Offensive Player of the Week for this game against the Falcons. In Week 13 against the Philadelphia Eagles, he had eight receptions for 133 receiving yards and one touchdown in the 20–14 victory. He won NFC Offensive Player of the Week for his game against the Eagles. Rice surpassed Steve Largent's career receiving touchdown record on December 6 in a Week 14 game against the Miami Dolphins, scoring his 101st touchdown. In Week 16 against the Tampa Bay Buccaneers, he had seven receptions for 118 receiving yards and two receiving touchdowns in the 21–14 victory. Overall, Rice finished the season with 84 catches for 1,201 yards and ten touchdowns, and was once again named to the Pro Bowl and First-team All-Pro team. Rice helped the 49ers to an NFL-best 14–2 record, and they made the postseason. San Francisco won in the Divisional Round against the Redskins, but lost in the NFC Championship against the eventual Super Bowl champion Dallas Cowboys, being unable to stop the offense of Troy Aikman and Emmitt Smith. Rice had eight receptions for 123 yards and a touchdown in the game, with the touchdown being his 13th of his postseason career, an NFL record.

After the 1992 season, in April 1993, Montana was traded to the Kansas City Chiefs; Rice wasn't able to properly say goodbye to him, and believed that San Francisco should have "treated Joe with more class" when they traded him. In Week 8, Rice had a 155-yard performance with two receiving touchdowns against the Phoenix Cardinals. In Week 11, Rice had eight receptions for 172 yards and four touchdowns against the Tampa Bay Buccaneers in the 45–21 victory. For his game against Tampa Bay, he won NFC Offensive Player of the Week. Two weeks later, he had eight receptions for 166 receiving yards and two receiving touchdowns in the 35–10 victory over the Los Angeles Rams. In Week 16, he had four receptions for 132 receiving yards and one touchdown in the 55–17 victory over the Detroit Lions. Rice caught 98 receptions for 1,503 yards and 15 touchdowns in the 1993 season; both his receiving yards and touchdown numbers led the league. He was awarded his second career NFL Offensive Player of The Year Award, along with being selected to the Pro Bowl and First-team All-Pro teams. San Francisco finished the season 10–6, and made the postseason. Rice and the 49ers won in the Divisional Round against the New York Giants, but once again lost in the NFC Championship against the Dallas Cowboys; Rice recorded nine receptions for 126 yards during the 1993 postseason.

While he didn't get along with free agent addition Deion Sanders, he believed Sanders would help in the 49ers' pursuit of the Super Bowl. These assertions were proven correct, as Rice made it back to the Super Bowl with the 49ers in 1994, recording 112 receptions for 1,499 yards and 13 touchdowns, with Sanders winning the NFL Defensive Player of the Year Award. The season began against the Los Angeles Raiders, where he had a seven reception, 169-yard game with two touchdowns (rushing for one more), moving into first place in the NFL records for career touchdowns, with 127. On September 18 against the Rams, his 147 receiving yards from 11 catches moved him past Art Monk as the NFLs active leader in that category and past Charlie Joiner for third all-time. In Week 12, in another game against the Rams, he had 16 receptions for 165 receiving yards and three receiving touchdowns. For his game against the Rams, he won NFC Offensive Player of the Week. In Week 15 against the Chargers, he had 12 receptions for 144 receiving yards in the 38–15 victory. He passed Largent for second place in the 16th game of the season. Rice was selected to the Pro Bowl and First-team All-Pro teams. With a 13–3 record and making the postseason, the 49ers won against the Bears in the Divisional Round. In the NFC Championship, they faced the Cowboys for the third straight year. After two previous defeats, the 49ers were victorious against the Cowboys 38–28. Rice was a vital component in their 49–26 victory over the San Diego Chargers in Super Bowl XXIX, combined with a six-touchdown performance by Young, Rice caught ten passes after catching six in the 49ers last two postseason games, coupled with 149 yards and three touchdowns, despite playing with a separated shoulder for much of the game. In three Super Bowl appearances at this point in his career, Rice caught 28 receptions for 512 yards and seven touchdowns, with all three statistics career Super Bowl records.

==== Final 49ers' seasons (1995–2000) ====
During the 1995 season, Rice had a record-setting campaign. After an 87-yard, one-touchdown day to start the season against the New Orleans Saints, Rice had 11 receptions for 167 yards and two touchdowns in a 41–10 victory over the Atlanta Falcons. Following a two-touchdown game against the New England Patriots in Week 3, Rice had 11 receptions for 181 yards in a 27–24 loss to the Detroit Lions. In Rice's next three games, he scored a receiving touchdown in each. On October 29, with an eight reception, 108-yard performance in Week 9, he surpassed James Lofton as the all-time leader in receiving yards against the Saints, with 14,040. Against the Cowboys, he had five receptions for 161 yards and a touchdown in a Week 11 victory. In Week 12, against the Miami Dolphins, he had eight receptions for 149 yards and two touchdowns in the 44–20 victory. Rice had one of the best statistical games in his career against the Vikings, catching 14 passes for a career-high 289 yards (at the time the fifth-most in a game), and three touchdowns. Rice won NFC Offensive Player of the Week for his game against the Vikings. Vikings head coach Dennis Green said of Rice: "We did take the 49ers out of their running game, but Jerry was the one ingredient we had a hard time stopping", "In fact, we had a hard time slowing him down". In the final game of the regular season against the Atlanta Falcons, he surpassed Art Monk as the all-time leader in receptions, with 942; his performance included 12 receptions for 153 yards, a 41-yard touchdown-throw, and a fumble recovery for a touchdown; his yards total was enough to break the record for most receiving yards in a season, with 1,848 yards, coupled with 122 receptions and 15 touchdowns. He was selected to the Pro Bowl and First-team All-Pro teams. His single-season receiving yards record was not broken until Calvin Johnson broke it in 2012. With an 11–5 record and making the postseason, the 49ers lost in the Divisional Round to the Green Bay Packers, in which Rice had 11 receptions for 117 yards.

During the offseason of 1996, Rice and Jackie were expecting their third child, and on May 16, 1996, Jada Rice was born. Minutes after the birth, however, Jackie suffered complications and nearly died from blood loss. She made a recovery after many surgeries. This caused Rice to miss almost all of June mini-camp and one week of training camp; he was supported by his teammates and coaches along the way. Even through these troubles, he was available for the start of the regular season. In Week 4, against the Carolina Panthers, he had ten receptions for 127 receiving yards. In Week 7, he had his only game of the season with multiple receiving touchdowns with two against the Green Bay Packers. He had ten receptions for 129 yard and a touchdown in a Week 15 loss to the Carolina Panthers. Overall, he recorded 108 receptions (leading the NFL) for 1,254 yards and eight touchdowns. Rice was selected to the Pro Bowl and First-team All-Pro. With a 12–4 record and making the postseason, San Francisco won in the Wild Card Round against the Philadelphia Eagles 14–0 with Rice scoring a touchdown, but lost to the Green Bay Packers in the Divisional Round, as the 49ers were unable to gain any ground with their offense, with only 196 yards of total offense. Through 1994 and 1996, Rice racked up 342 catches for 4,601 yards and 36 touchdowns.

Before the 1997 season, Rice signed a seven-year, $32 million contract. During the 49ers' opening game of the season, Rice tore the anterior cruciate and medial collateral ligaments in his left knee on a reverse. Warren Sapp of the Buccaneers grabbed Rice by the face mask and wrenched him to the ground, drawing a 15-yard personal foul. The injury broke Rice's streak of 189 consecutive games played; throughout high school, college, and the NFL he had never missed a game excluding three strike games. Wanting to make it back in time for the retirement of Montana's jersey number, he made his return 14 weeks later on December 15, much earlier than doctors wanted him to. He scored a touchdown, but he cracked his left patella as he came down with the catch. He missed the Pro Bowl team for the first time in 11 years due to the injury. San Francisco still made the postseason with a 13–3 record, beating the Minnesota Vikings in the Divisional Round 38–22, but lost for the third straight time against the Green Bay Packers 23–10 in the NFC Championship.

Rice made a full recovery, coming back in time for the 1998 regular season opener. In Week 4, against the Atlanta Falcons, he had eight receptions for 162 receiving yards and two receiving touchdowns in the 31–20 victory. In Week 11, in another game against the Falcons, he had ten receptions for 169 receiving yards and a receiving touchdown. Overall, he recorded 82 catches for 1,157 yards and nine touchdowns, becoming the oldest receiver to record a 1,000-yard season, at age 36, and returned to the Pro Bowl team. San Francisco made the postseason with a 12–4 record. They faced the Packers once again the Wild Card Round. Although Rice only had one catch for six yards in the game, the 49ers defeated the Packers 30–27. San Francisco was defeated in the Divisional Round by the Atlanta Falcons 18–20. Rice had a receiving touchdown in the loss.

In Week 13 of the 1999 season, Rice had nine receptions for 157 receiving yards and two touchdowns in the 44–30 loss to the Cincinnati Bengals. In the 49ers' regular season finale against the Atlanta Falcons, he had six receptions for 143 yards in the 34–29 defeat. Rice finished the 1999 season with 67 receptions for 830 yards and five touchdowns. The season was the first that Rice failed to reach 1,000 yards receiving while playing in all 16 games. San Francisco struggled as a whole, going 4–12 and missing the postseason, losing 11 out of their last 12 games after Young had concussion troubles, leading him to retire after the season.

In the 2000 season, his final season in San Francisco, he again missed 1,000 receiving yards, with 75 receptions for 805 yards and seven touchdowns. The 2000 season marked Rice's first without having a game where he recorded at least 100 receiving yards. In his final home game against the Bears, he had seven receptions for 76 yards in the 17–0 victory. It was the same game in which Terrell Owens set the single-game record for receptions, with 20. That angered Rice as he wanted it to be a special day for him, not for Owens, and many of Owens' receptions were intentionally called in order for him to break the record. San Francisco again struggled going 6–10 and missing the postseason.

=== Later career (2001–2005) ===
==== Oakland Raiders (2001–2004) ====
With the emergence of Terrell Owens in San Francisco and because of their desire to rebuild the team and clear salary, Rice was released by the 49ers in June 2001 and signed with the Oakland Raiders for a four-year, $7.8 million contract. He joined a Raiders team coming off a loss in the playoffs to form one of the oldest receiver duos with Tim Brown (age 35). During the season, he had an eight reception, 131-yard performance with three touchdowns against the Chargers, and a nine reception, 108-yard performance against the Broncos. Rice caught 83 passes for 1,139 yards and nine touchdowns for the year. Oakland finished the season with a 10–6 record and made the postseason. The Raiders played the New York Jets in the Wild Card Round, winning 38–24, with Rice having nine receptions for 183 yards and a touchdown. In the Divisional Round, the Raiders faced Tom Brady and the New England Patriots. In what was later called the "Tuck Rule Game", the Raiders lost in overtime 16–13, after officials reviewed an apparent Brady fumble, overturning the call on the field to be an incomplete pass, allowing the Patriots to kick the game-tying field goal, all in a severe snowstorm.

In 2002, Rice caught 92 passes for 1,211 yards and seven touchdowns, while being named to his 13th Pro Bowl team, and to the Second-team All-Pro team. Rice's teammate, Raiders starting quarterback Rich Gannon, was named the NFL's Most Valuable Player for the 2002 season. Against the Tennessee Titans, where Rice had seven receptions for 144 yards and a touchdown, he surpassed Walter Payton as the all-time leader in scrimmage yards, with 21,281 scrimmage yards. He scored his 200th career touchdown against the Broncos. Oakland finished the season with an 11–5 record and made the postseason. They won in the Divisional Round against the Jets, 30–10. Rice had a receiving touchdown in the win. The team won in the AFC Championship against the Tennessee Titans, 41–24, making it to the Super Bowl. There, against the Buccaneers, coached by former Raiders head coach Jon Gruden, they were defeated 21–48, with Gannon throwing five interceptions, including three for touchdowns, and Rice having five receptions for 77 yards and a touchdown. Up to this point, Rice had been undefeated in the Super Bowl, having already won three with San Francisco. The fact that he lost a Super Bowl overwhelmed him to the point that he cried in his hotel room after the game.

In Week 4 of the 2003 season, Rice had seven receptions for 126 receiving yards in the 34–31 victory of the San Diego Chargers. In Week 16, against the Green Bay Packers, he had ten receptions for 159 receiving yards in the 41–7 loss. Overall, in the 2003 season, Rice caught 63 passes for 869 yards; he didn't score a touchdown until the 12th game of the season, scoring only two through the whole year. Oakland as a team regressed from their 11–5 record in 2002 to a 4–12 record in 2003, leading to the firing of head coach Bill Callahan. That led Rice to be frustrated about his role with the team.

By the time the 2004 season was starting, Rice struggled, and by the fourth game of the season, Rice had five receptions for only 64 yards. Because of that, he asked Raiders owner Al Davis to trade him.

==== Seattle Seahawks (2004) ====
Rice was traded to the Seattle Seahawks six games into the 2004 season in exchange for a seventh round pick and reunited with Seattle head coach Mike Holmgren, who had previously worked with Rice as San Francisco's offensive coordinator. Rice wore Largent's retired No. 80. According to Largent, Seahawks GM Bob Whitsitt misled him and Rice to increase jersey sales. In a Monday Night Football game against the Dallas Cowboys, Rice set the career record for combined net yards by catching a 27-yard touchdown pass from Matt Hasselbeck, his 35th career record. He finished that game eight receptions for 145 yards and a touchdown. In total Rice had 25 receptions for 362 receiving yards and three touchdowns with the Seahawks, having 30 receptions for 429 yards and three touchdowns in total for the season. At age 41, he managed to play 17 games in a 16-game season, as he was traded before Oakland's bye week and after Seattle's, and never missed a game, so he played six games for the Raiders and 11 for the Seahawks. Rice played his last non-preseason professional game for Seattle, a Wild Card Round loss to the St. Louis Rams in which he did not catch a pass.

==== Denver Broncos (2005) ====
On May 25, 2005, Rice signed a one-year contract worth $790,000 in total salary with the Denver Broncos, which was his lowest contract offer in his 20 years in the league. During training camp, Rice moved ahead of Darius Watts to Denver's no. 3 receiver spot, but was bumped back down the depth chart during the preseason. In four preseason games, Rice caught four passes for 24 yards.

=== Retirement ===
On September 5, 2005, Rice announced his retirement after 20 seasons. Because he never played for Denver outside of the preseason, Rice was only allowed his guaranteed money for a grand total of $25,000. In August 2006, the 49ers announced that Rice would sign a contract with them, allowing him to retire as a member of the team where his NFL career began. On August 24, 2006, he officially retired as a 49er, signing a one-day contract for $1,985,806.49. The number represented the year Rice was drafted (1985), his No. 80, the year he retired (2006), and the 49ers (49). The figure was ceremonial, and Rice received no money. A halftime ceremony honored him during the 49ers' match-up with the Seattle Seahawks on November 19, 2006.

== Legacy ==
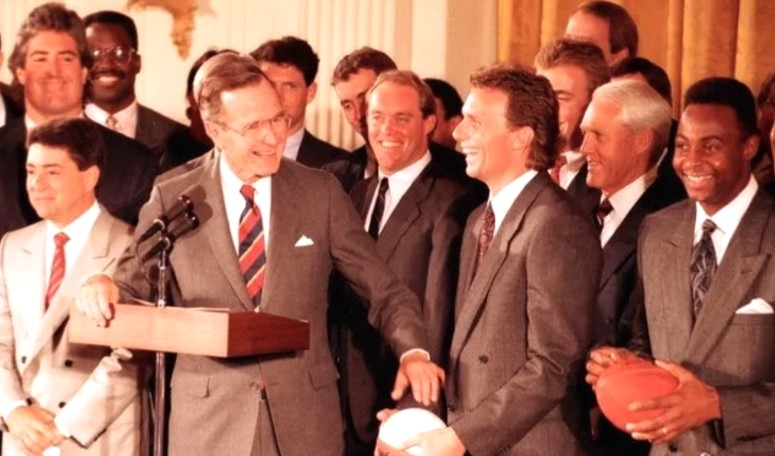
Rice (far right) at a White House ceremony honoring the San Francisco 49ers' Super Bowl XXIII victory

Rice holds numerous NFL receiving records. His 197 career touchdown receptions are 41 scores more than the second place of 156 touchdown receptions by Randy Moss; his 208 total touchdowns (197 receiving, ten rushing, and one fumble recovery) are 33 scores ahead of Emmitt Smith's second-place total of 175. His 22,895 career receiving yards are 5,403 yards ahead of the second-place Larry Fitzgerald. His 1,256 career points scored make him the highest-scoring non-kicker in NFL history. Many of these records are considered by sports analysts to be unbreakable. During a career spanning two decades, Rice averaged 75.6 receiving yards per game. He received MVP votes in six out of his 20 seasons, finishing as the runner-up twice in 1987 and 1995. He won two NFL Offensive Player of The Year Awards, and a Bert Bell Award in 1987.

Rice is remembered as one of the best clutch players in football history, often making game-winning catches throughout his career. Rice also was noted as an effective blocking receiver. Rice's "famous" catching ability, sometimes attributed to him having to catch bricks when working with his father during his childhood, led him to 1,549 career receptions, 117 ahead of the second-place Fitzgerald.

Despite being keen about his public image early in his career, Rice is remembered for his work ethic and dedication. He still cared extensively about his physical appearance, often tailoring his uniform and jersey, and combed his hair before putting on his helmet; his philosophy was: "If you look good, feel good, you'll play good", as described by Shawn Rogers, one of his friends. In his 20 NFL seasons, Rice missed only 17 regular season games, 14 of them in the 1997 season and the other three in the strike-shortened season of 1987; his 303 games are the most by an NFL wide receiver by a wide margin. In addition to staying on the field, his work ethic showed in his dedication to conditioning and running precise routes, with coach Dennis Green calling him "the best route runner I've ever seen". One of the best-known examples of his dedication and ethic was "The Hill," a steep hill in Edgewood County Park & Natural Preserve which is 2.5 miles (4 km) long. Rice sprinted across the hill every day during the offseason to improve his abilities.

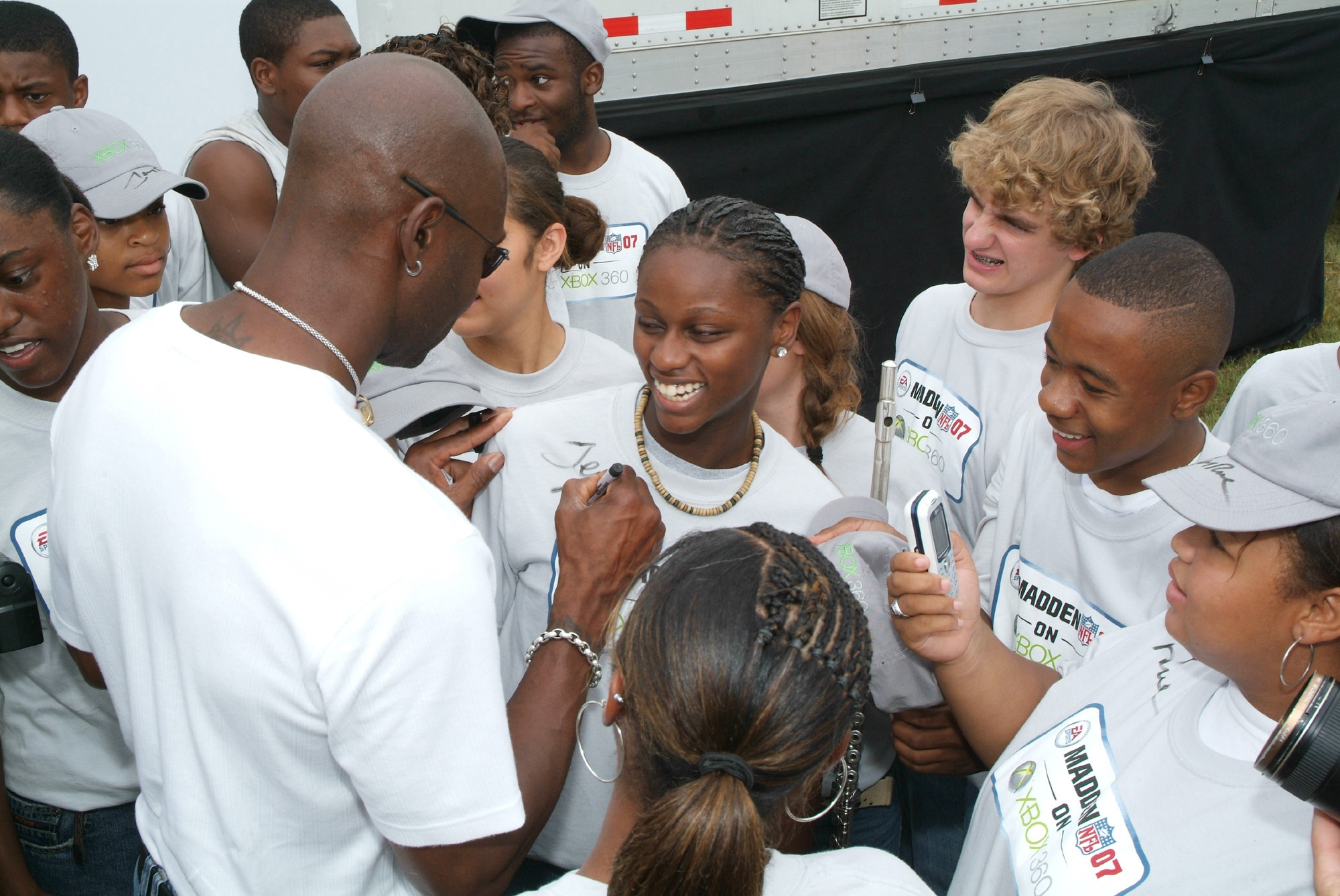
Rice signing autographs in Madden, Mississippi northwest of Meridian to celebrate the launch of Madden NFL 07 on Xbox 360, August 2006

In 1999, Rice was ranked No. 2 on the Sporting News' list of the 100 Greatest Football Players, behind only Jim Brown, and was 35 places ahead of the next-highest-ranked player then active, Deion Sanders. In 2000, Rice won the ESPY Award for Pro Football Player of the Decade for the 1990s. On November 4, 2010, he was ranked No. 1 on The Top 100: NFL's Greatest Players. In 2011, The Sports Network awarded the inaugural Jerry Rice Award, to be given each year to the most outstanding freshman Football Championship Subdivision (formerly I-AA) player. The inaugural winner was Towson running back Terrance West.

In January 2015, Rice talked about putting Stickum, a substance which makes the ball easier to catch and hold on to, on his gloves during his career saying, "I know this might be a little illegal, guys, but you put a little spray, a little Stickum on them, to make sure that texture is a little sticky." Stickum and similar adhesives were banned in the NFL in 1981, four years before Rice joined the league; he said that "all players" who played in his era used the substance. The claims were rebutted by Pro Football Hall of Fame members Cris Carter and Michael Irvin. Rice retracted his claim shortly thereafter and said that he "never used Stickum."

Rice was selected for induction in the Pro Football Hall of Fame class of 2010 in his first year of eligibility. He was inducted in Canton, Ohio, on August 7, 2010, alongside Emmitt Smith, Floyd Little, Russ Grimm, Rickey Jackson, Dick LeBeau, and John Randle. On September 20, 2010, during halftime of a game against the Saints, the 49ers retired Rice's No. 80 jersey. He was officially named to both the NFL 75th Anniversary All-Time Team and the NFL 100th Anniversary All-Time Team. During his career, he was included in the NFL 1980s All-Decade Team and the NFL 1990s All-Decade Team.

== NFL career statistics ==
Legend
	AP NFL Offensive Player of the Year
	Super Bowl MVP
	Won the Super Bowl
	NFL record
	Led the league
**Bold**	Career high

=== Regular season ===
Year	Team	Games		Receiving					Rushing					Fumbles		Other TDs
Year	Team	GP	GS	Rec	Yds	Avg	Lng	TD	Att	Yds	Avg	Lng	TD	Fum	Lost	Other TDs
1985	SF	16	4	49	927	18.9	66	3	6	26	4.3	15	1	0	0	—
1986	SF	16	15	86	1,570	18.3	66	15	10	72	7.2	18	1	0	0	—
1987	SF	12	12	65	1,078	16.6	57	**22**	8	51	6.4	17	1	0	0	—
1988	SF	16	16	64	1,306	**20.4**	**96**	9	**13**	**107**	8.2	29	1	0	0	—
1989	SF	16	16	82	1,483	18.1	68	17	5	33	6.6	17	0	0	0	—
1990	SF	16	16	100	1,502	15.0	64	13	2	0	0.0	2	0	0	0	—
1991	SF	16	16	80	1,206	15.1	73	14	1	2	2.0	2	0	1	0	—
1992	SF	16	16	84	1,201	14.3	80	10	9	58	6.4	26	1	2	1	—
1993	SF	16	16	98	1,503	15.3	80	15	3	69	**23.0**	**43**	1	**3**	0	—
1994	SF	16	16	112	1,499	13.4	69	13	7	93	13.3	28	**2**	1	1	—
1995	SF	16	16	**122**	**1,848**	15.1	81	15	5	36	7.2	20	1	**3**	**3**	**1**
1996	SF	16	16	108	1,254	11.6	39	8	11	77	7.0	38	1	0	0	—
1997	SF	2	1	7	78	11.1	16	1	1	−10	−10.0	−10	0	0	0	—
1998	SF	16	16	82	1,157	14.1	75	9	—	—	—	—	—	2	2	—
1999	SF	16	16	67	830	12.4	62	5	2	13	6.5	11	0	0	0	—
2000	SF	16	16	75	805	10.7	68	7	1	−2	−2.0	−2	0	**3**	2	—
2001	OAK	16	15	83	1,139	13.7	40	9	—	—	—	—	—	1	0	—
2002	OAK	16	16	92	1,211	13.2	75	7	3	20	6.7	12	0	1	1	—
2003	OAK	16	15	63	869	13.8	47	2	—	—	—	—	—	2	1	—
2004	OAK	6	5	5	67	13.4	18	0	—	—	—	—	—	0	0	—
2004	SEA	11	9	25	362	14.5	56	3	—	—	—	—	—	0	0	—
Career		303	284	1,549	22,895	14.8	96	197	87	645	7.4	43	10	19	11	1

=== Postseason ===
Year	Team	Games		Receiving					Rushing					Fumbles	
Year	Team	GP	GS	Rec	Yds	Avg	Lng	TD	Att	Yds	Avg	Lng	TD	Fum	Lost
1985	SF	1	1	4	45	11.3	20	0	—	—	—	—	—	**1**	0
1986	SF	1	1	3	48	16.0	24	0	—	—	—	—	—	**1**	**1**
1987	SF	1	1	3	28	9.3	13	0	—	—	—	—	—	0	0
1988	SF	3	3	**21**	**409**	**19.5**	61	**6**	**3**	**29**	9.7	**21**	0	0	0
1989	SF	3	3	19	317	16.7	**72**	5	—	—	—	—	—	0	0
1990	SF	2	2	11	122	11.1	19	1	—	—	—	—	—	0	0
1992	SF	2	2	14	211	15.1	36	1	1	9	9.0	9	0	0	0
1993	SF	2	2	9	126	14.0	23	0	1	−9	−9.0	−9	0	0	0
1994	SF	3	3	16	233	14.6	44	4	1	10	**10.0**	10	0	0	0
1995	SF	1	1	11	117	10.6	32	0	1	5	5.0	5	0	0	0
1996	SF	2	2	9	86	9.6	36	1	—	—	—	—	—	0	0
1997	SF	0	0	Did not play due to injury											
1998	SF	2	2	4	69	17.3	38	1	—	—	—	—	—	0	0
2001	OAK	2	2	13	231	17.8	47	1	—	—	—	—	—	0	0
2002	OAK	3	3	14	362	14.5	48	2	—	—	—	—	—	**1**	0
2004	SEA	1	1	—	—	—	—	—	—	—	—	—	—	0	0
Career		29	29	151	2,245	14.9	72	22	7	44	6.3	21	0	3	1

== Career highlights ==
=== Awards and honors ===
Throughout his collegiate and professional career, Rice has won the following awards and honors:

NFL

- 3× Super Bowl champion (XXIII, XXIV, XXIX)
- Super Bowl MVP (XXIII)
- PFWA NFL MVP (1987)
- Jim Thorpe Trophy (1987)
- 2× Sporting News NFL MVP (1987, 1990)
- Bert Bell Award (1987)
- 2× NFL Offensive Player of the Year (1987, 1993)
- Pro Bowl Game MVP (1996)
- 13× Pro Bowl (1986–1996, 1998, 2002)
- 10× First Team All-Pro (1986–1990, 1992–1996)
- Second Team All-Pro (2002)
- 10× PFWA All-NFL Team (1986–1990, 1992–1996)
- 5× NEA First Team All-Pro (1986, 1987, 1989, 1990, 1992)
- 2× NEA Second Team All-Pro (1988, 1991)
- 11× Sporting News All-Pro Team (1986–1996)
- 6× PFW All-Pro Team (1986–1991)
- PFWA All-Rookie Team (1985)
- 6× NFL receiving yards leader (1986, 1989, 1990, 1993–1995)
- 2× NFL receptions leader (1990, 1996)
- 6× NFL receiving touchdowns leader (1986, 1987, 1989–1991, 1993)
- NFL scoring leader (1987)
- NFL 1980s All-Decade Team
- NFL 1990s All-Decade Team
- NFL 75th Anniversary All-Time Team
- NFL 100th Anniversary All-Time Team (unanimous selection)
- Super Bowl Silver Anniversary Team (1990)
- NFL All-Time Team (2000)
- No. 80 retired by the San Francisco 49ers
- San Francisco 49ers Hall of Fame
- No. 1 on The Top 100: NFL's Greatest Players

NCAA

- Blue–Gray Football Classic Champion (1984)
  - Blue–Gray Football Classic MVP (1984)
- 2× First Team Division I-AA All-American (1983, 1984)
  - 2× GNS First Team All-American (1983, 1984)
  - NEA First Team All-American (1984)
  - Sporting News All-American (1984)
  - FWAA All-American (1984)
- Mississippi Valley State Delta Devils No. 88 retired
- In 1999, Mississippi Valley State University renamed their football stadium the Rice–Totten Stadium

Halls of Fame

- Pro Football Hall of Fame – Class of 2010
- College Football Hall of Fame – Class of 2006
- Black College Football Hall of Fame – Class of 2010
- Mississippi Sports Hall of Fame – Class of 2007
- Bay Area Sports Hall of Fame – Class of 2007
- Mississippi Valley State University Athletics Hall of Fame – Class of 2006
- United States Athletics Hall of Fame – Class of 2025

Other

- Harold & Carole Pump Foundation – Lifetime Achievement Award (2019)

=== NFL records ===
As of the end of the 2015 NFL season, Rice holds the following league records:

- Most career receiving yards: 22,895
- Most career receptions: 1,549
- Most career touchdown receptions: 197
- Most career yards from scrimmage: 23,540 (22,895 receiving, 645 rushing)
- Most career touchdowns from scrimmage: 207 (197 receiving, 10 rushing)
- Most career all purpose yards: 23,546 (22,895 receiving, 645 rushing, 6 kick returns)
- Most career all purpose touchdowns: 208 (197 receiving, 10 rushing, 1 fumble recovery)
- Most career postseason receiving yards: 2,245
- Most career postseason touchdown receptions: 22
- Most career Super Bowl receiving yards: 589
- Most career Super Bowl receptions: 33
- Most career Super Bowl touchdown receptions: 8
- Most career Super Bowl points scored: 48
- Most receiving yards in one Super Bowl: 215
- Most receiving touchdowns in one Super Bowl: 3
- Most games of 100 or more receiving yards: 76
- Most consecutive games with a reception: 274
- Most consecutive games with a touchdown from scrimmage: 13
- Most seasons of 1,000 or more receiving yards: 14
- Fastest player to reach 100 touchdown receptions: 120 games
- Fastest player to reach 14,000 receiving yards: 164 games
- Fastest player to reach 15,000 receiving yards: 172 games
- Most points scored by a non-kicker: 1,256
- Most games played by a wide receiver: 303 (leads all non-kickers and non-quarterbacks)
- Oldest player to catch a touchdown in a Super Bowl: 40 years, 105 days
- Most receiving touchdowns in a game: 5 (tied with Kellen Winslow and Bob Shaw)

== Personal life ==
Rice married Jacqueline "Jackie" Bernice Mitchell on September 8, 1987. Jacqueline Rice filed for divorce in June 2007, which became final in late December 2009. They have three children, Jaqui Bonet (born 1987), Jerry Rice Jr. (born 1991), and Jada Symone (born 1996). Jerry Jr., who attended high school at Menlo School in Atherton, California, graduated in 2009. He was a walk-on at UCLA and redshirted his first season. After three seasons and limited playing time, Jerry Jr. graduated from UCLA and transferred to UNLV, and was eligible to play immediately. He played wide receiver for the Rebels and participated in a 49ers local pro day before the 2014 NFL draft, but was not drafted. Jerry Rice has another son, Brenden Rice, who played football for the University of Colorado Boulder for two years. On January 1, 2022, it was announced that Brenden was transferring to the University of Southern California. As of October 21, 2019, Rice is married to Latisha Pelayo whom he had dated since 2008.

Rice is a Christian. He said he grew up as a Christian and still has the same faith from his youth.

=== After football ===
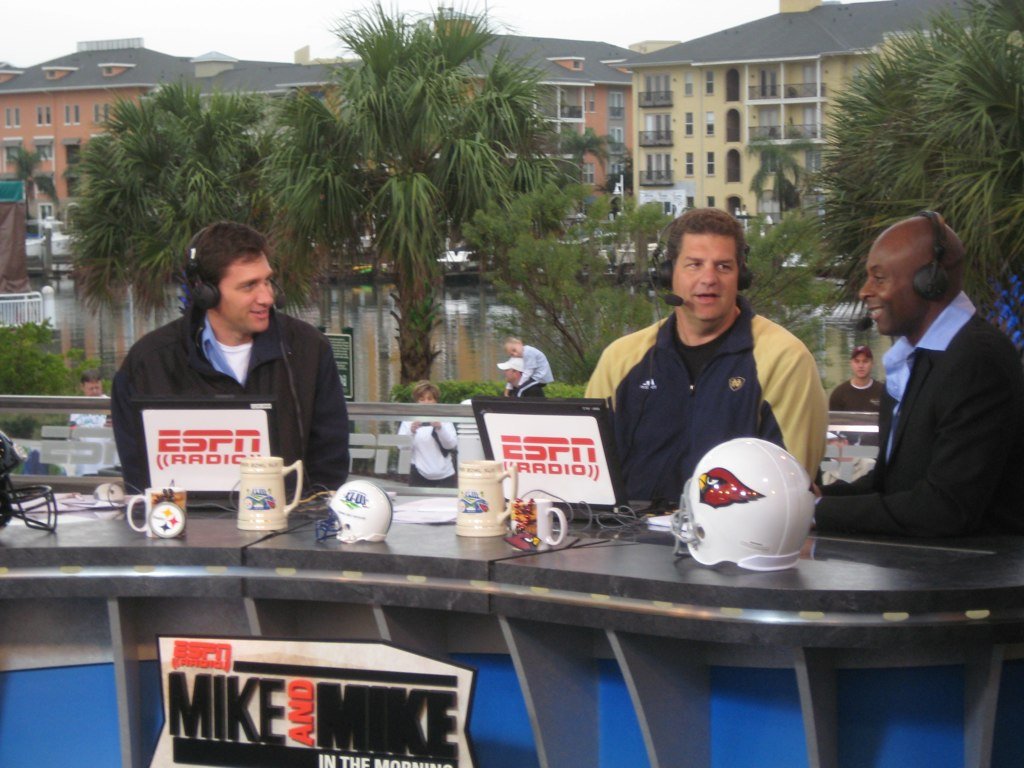
Rice being interviewed on Mike & Mike on ESPN, January 2009

During the 2005–2006 broadcasting season, Rice competed in the second season of the reality competition show Dancing with the Stars. He paired with dancer Anna Trebunskaya, and they reached the final two before losing to singer Drew Lachey and his partner Cheryl Burke. In 2009, Rice portrayed Hal Gore in the film Without a Paddle: Nature's Calling. In the same year, he guest-starred as himself in the episode "Lyin' King" on the sitcom Rules of Engagement. Rice has co-authored two books about his life: Rice (with Michael Silver, published 1996, ISBN 0-312-14795-3) and Go Long: My Journey Beyond the Game and the Fame (with Brian Curtis, published 2007, ISBN 0-345-49611-6). In 2019, he co-authored a book America's Game: The NFL at 100 (with Randy O. Williams, ISBN 978-0062692900), celebrating the 100th anniversary of the National Football League. Rice and his dog, Nitus, were featured in Jerry Rice & Nitus' Dog Football, a video game for the Wii that was released on August 16, 2011. Rice served as an alumnus team captain for "Team Rice" during the 2014 and 2016 Pro Bowls. In 2022, Rice partnered with the American Red Cross to raise awareness about blood donations.

Rice has played golf for over 20 years and woke up early to play golf during his football career. He competed in the Fresh Express Classic at TPC Stonebrae on the Nationwide Tour on April 15–16, 2010, receiving a sponsor's exemption to play in the tournament. Rice missed the cut and finished one shot ahead of last place, 17-over and 151st among the 152 players who completed two rounds. He was a team captain on The Big Break Puerto Rico, where his team won.

After Colin Kaepernick announced that he would be kneeling during the national anthem during games, Rice criticized his actions and said on Twitter, "All lives matter. So much going on in this world today. Can we all just get along! Colin, I respect your stance but don't disrespect the Flag". Following criticism from other players and the public, Rice offered support to Kaepernick in bringing awareness for injustice.

== See also ==
- List of NFL career receiving yards leaders
- List of NFL career receptions leaders
- List of NFL career receiving touchdowns leaders
- List of NFL career scoring leaders
- List of NFL annual receiving yards leaders
- List of NFL annual receptions leaders
- List of NFL receiving touchdowns leaders
- List of NFL annual scoring leaders
- List of NFL individual records

== Footnotes ==
- Maiocco, Matt (2011). San Francisco 49ers: Where Have You Gone? Joe Montana, Y. A. Tittle, Steve Young, and Other 49ers Greats (illustrated ed.). Skyhorse Publishing. ISBN 978-1613210451. Archived from the original on April 25, 2021.
- Sterngass, Jon (2008). Jerry Rice. New York: Chelsea House. ISBN 9780791096079.
- Rice & Curtis, Jerry & Brian (2007). Go Long!: My Journey Beyond The Game And The Fame. New York: Ballantine Books. ISBN 9780345496119.
- O'Brien, Richard (2005). The Ultimate Sports Handbook. London: Chronicle Books. ISBN 9781594740343.

Awards and achievements
Preceded by John O'Hurley & Charlotte Jørgensen	Dancing with the Stars (US) runner up Season 2 (Spring 2006 with Anna Trebunskaya)	Succeeded by Mario Lopez & Karina Smirnoff
