= Starkville High School =

Location
- 603 Yellowjacket Drive; Starkville, Mississippi; United States; 33.451°N 88.821°W

Information
- Type: Public
- Motto: Proud to be a Yellowjacket
- Established: 1899
- School district: Starkville Oktibbeha Consolidated School District
- Principal: Watress Harris
- Teaching staff: 92.55 (on an FTE basis)
- Grades: 9 – 12
- Enrollment: 1,400 (2023-2024)
- Student to teacher ratio: 15.13
- Colors: Black and gold
- Mascot: Yellowjacket
- Rival: West Point High School
- Newspaper: The Jacket Buzz
- Website: www.starkvillesd.com/starkville-high-school/

Starkville High School (SHS) is a public secondary school in Starkville, Mississippi, United States. It is the only high school in the Starkville Oktibbeha Consolidated School District, serving grades 9–12. It offers more than 140 courses, including over 10 Advanced Placement courses. Its school colors are black and gold, and its mascot is the Yellowjacket, a predatory wasp.

For the 2018–2019 academic year the graduation rate was 86.3% and the enrollment was 1,420.

The consolidated school district serves all of the county. The previous Starkville School District served Starkville, the Mississippi State University census-designated place, Longview, and some other unincorporated areas.

== History ==
A school was built for white students in 1899. The initial enrollment was 206, with an average attendance of 164. By 1910 the enrollment had grown to 312 and the average attendance to 270, due both to the increased number of residents and the superiority of the school causing county residents to choose to attend there. The county paid the city more than the cost of attendance, and so helped fund the school. There were too few desks, and the auditorium was of insufficient size, so a new school building was proposed. The negro school was deemed unsuitable for occupation, and $3,500 was allocated to build a new black school, in addition to the $2.00 per student provided by the state and the $200 generated by the negro poll tax.

Prior to 1970, separate schools were maintained for white and black students. In 1970, the federal government mandated the integration of the two systems. Starkville High became the home for all students in grades 9-12, while the former high school for black students, Henderson became the junior high school. In 1969, Starkville Academy was founded as a segregation academy on property adjacent to Starkville High for parents of white children who wished to keep their children in segregated schools.

In 2015 the schools of Oktibbeha County School District consolidated into the Starkville district. Two high schools, East High and West High, consolidated into Starkville High; this added about 300 students to Starkville High.

== Notable alumni ==
- Luke Altmyer — football player
- Tony Akins – football player
- Jake Arians – NFL football player
- Dee Barton – jazz musician
- Natrone Brooks – NFL cornerback for the Atlanta Falcons
- A. J. Brown – NFL wide receiver for the New England Patriots
- Joe Carter – played NFL football for the Miami Dolphins, 1984-1986
- Tyson Carter – professional basketball player
- Muhammad Dakhlalla – convicted of conspiring to provide material support to a terrorist organization
- Kermit Davis Jr. – head college basketball coach at Ole Miss, Idaho, Texas A&M and Middle Tennessee State University, class of 1978
- Antuan Edwards – NFL football player
- Carl Fair – football player
- Willie Gay – linebacker for the Miami Dolphins and 2020 2nd Round Draft Pick by the Kansas City Chiefs from Mississippi State
- Willie Earl Gillespie – USFL and NFL football player, played and coached at SHS
- Helen Young Hayes – money manager
- Shauntay Hinton – Miss USA 2002
- Nate Hughes – NFL football player, class of 2003
- Kobe Jones – NFL football player, class of 2016
- Freddie Milons – football player
- Dot Murphy – basketball player and coach, first female football coach in the NJCAA
- Travis Outlaw – NBA basketball player, class of 2003
- Ethan Pulliam – football player
- Barrin Simpson – football player
- Emmett H. Walker Jr. – U.S. Army officer
- Gavin Ware – basketball player
- Latavious Williams – basketball player

== Notable faculty ==
- Jack Nix - NFL football player
