= Helen Young Hayes =

American investment fund manager

Helen Young Hayes (born July 11, 1962) is an investment fund manager best known for her success in running the Janus Worldwide Fund and Janus Overseas Fund. Prior to that she was a research associate at Fred Alger Management. She is a member of the Advisory Committee at Red Rocks Capital LLC.

Hayes attended Starkville High School and Yale University. In 2002 Hayes was promoted to oversee all Janus funds.

Morning Star analyst Russell Kinnell picked her as the analyst most similar to Peter Lynch, and in 1997 she was named Mutual Fund Manager of the Year. She retired from Janus in 2003. Hayes now owns Activate Workforce Solutions, a company that mentors underutilized workers.

== Personal life ==
In 1989, Hayes was aboard United Airlines Flight 232 which crashed in Sioux City, Iowa. Her younger sister Claire ran the Janus Olympus Fund. As a hobby, Hayes runs triathlons.
