= Oktibbeha County School District =

Former school district in the United States

The Oktibbeha County School District was a public school district serving rural communities in Oktibbeha County, Mississippi (USA). The district administrative offices were in Starkville. It is now a part of the Starkville-Oktibbeha Consolidated School District, effective July 1, 2015.

== History ==
In the 1960s and 70s, the school districts were reconfigured so that most of the areas surrounding Starkville were grouped into the Starkville School District (SSD). This resulted in a situation where the population of the OCSD had a median income of around half that of the SSD, and was over 90% black. Prior to 1970, black students from Sturgis were bused to Maben. One day before the faculty of the schools were to be integrated in February 1970, a black school in Maben was burned.

The district served most of Maben and the town of Sturgis in the West Oktibbeha County Elementary (Pre-K-6) and High School (7–12) as well as several communities in the western parts of the county not in the Starkville City School District. The East Oktibbeha County Elementary (K-6) and High School (7–12) served the communities in the eastern parts of Oktibbeha county not included in the Starkville City School District. OCSD was taken over the state twice due to academic failure and mismanagement, and the state proposed several times that it should be merged with the SSD. In 2013, the Mississippi Legislature passed a bill requiring that all Oktibbeha County schools be merged into the Starkville School District. In the implementation of this plan, East Oktibbeha Elementary was closed because its location would have resulted in a school that was over 90% black. The district was dissolved under Mississippi law on July 1, 2015.

== Schools ==
- East Oktibbeha County High School - Unincorporated area
- West Oktibbeha County High School - Maben
- East Oktibbeha County Elementary School - Unincorporated area
- West Oktibbeha County Elementary School (formerly Sturgis Elementary School) - Sturgis

Schools closed prior to the district's consolidation:

- Wicks Elementary School
- Alexander High School (for black children)
- Maben High School (for black children)
- Moor High School (for black children)
- Sturgis High School (for white children)

== Demographics ==
=== 2006-07 school year ===
There were a total of 876 students enrolled in the Oktibbeha County School District during the 2006–2007 school year. The gender makeup of the district was 51% female and 49% male. The racial makeup of the district was 91.55% African American, 8.33% White, and 0.11% Asian. 82.7% of the district's students were eligible to receive free lunch.

=== Previous school years ===
| School Year | Enrollment | Gender Makeup | | Racial Makeup | | | | |
| School Year | Enrollment | Female | Male | Asian | African American | Hispanic | Native American | White |
|---|---|---|---|---|---|---|---|---|
| 2005-06 | 833 | 50% | 50% | – | 91.36% | – | – | 8.64% |
| 2004-05 | 871 | 50% | 50% | – | 89.09% | – | – | 10.91% |
| 2003-04 | 922 | 48% | 52% | – | 89.15% | – | – | 10.85% |
| 2002-03 | 1,029 | 46% | 54% | – | 87.95% | 0.10% | – | 11.95% |

== Accountability statistics ==
| | 2006-07 | 2005-06 | 2004-05 | 2003-04 | 2002-03 |
|---|---|---|---|---|---|
| District Accreditation Status | Accredited | Accredited | Accredited | Advised | Probation |
School Performance Classifications
| Level 5 (Superior Performing) Schools | 0 | 0 | 0 | 0 | 0 |
| Level 4 (Exemplary) Schools | 0 | 1 | 0 | 1 | 1 |
| Level 3 (Successful) Schools | 3 | 1 | 1 | 2 | 0 |
| Level 2 (Under Performing) Schools | 1 | 2 | 2 | 1 | 3 |
| Level 1 (Low Performing) Schools | 0 | 0 | 1 | 0 | 1 |
| Not Assigned | 0 | 0 | 0 | 0 | 0 |

== See also ==
- List of school districts in Mississippi
