= Starkville Oktibbeha Consolidated School District =

School district in Mississippi, US

Coordinates: 33.461673°N 88.822192°W

The Starkville-Oktibbeha Consolidated School District (SOCSD), formerly Starkville Public School District, is a public school district in Oktibbeha County, Mississippi, headquartered in Starkville. The district serves all children within the county, including Starkville, residents of Mississippi State University, and the other communities and rural areas countywide due to the state legislature mandated consolidation with the Oktibbeha County School District in 2015.

== History ==
When federal mandates forced schools to integrate, Oktibbeha County realigned the school districts so that the Starkville School District (SSD) occupied the affluent neighborhoods surrounding Starkville, which was the center of Oktibbeha County, and included the majority of the tax base. The remaining fringes of the county were relegated to the Oktibbeha County School District (OCSD), which was poor, underfunded, failing, and over 90% black. Over the next few decades, the SSD became racially mixed, while the OCSD stumbled badly and was take over by state conservators on two occasions, most recently in 2013. Many in Starkville and at Mississippi State found the county system a source of shame. In 1970, when the schools were integrated, more than half of the black teachers were let go. In addition, the old Rosenwald school was burned to the ground. In 1970, immediately after the schools were integrated, the student population declined by 866 students from the previous year, for a total enrollment of 3,410, of which 1,762 were listed as negro and 1,649 as white.

In the 70s and 80s, various lawsuits including Montgomery v Starkville Municipal Separate School District alleged that the district dismissed or demoted black teachers because of their race, failed to compensate black teachers the same as white teachers, placed children in gifted or remedial programs based on race, and maintained segregation at the classroom level.

Various commissions and consultants in the 1990s and another in 2010 recommended the districts be merged to provide for a better and less segregated education. After repeated failures and charges of mismanagement, the state legislature attempted to get the schools to consolidate, first in the 1990s, and again in 2013 but with no avail. After the legislature passed a bill in 2014 forcing the SSD to consolidate with OCSD, the county was out of options. The OCSD district was dissolved under Mississippi law on July 1, 2015. The new consolidated SOCSD took the combined area of SSD and OCSD. The two elementary schools, East Oktibbeha and West Oktibbeha were to remain open while the high schools, East High and West High, consolidated into Starkville High School.

There was apprehension that the merger would cause white flight of students to local private schools including Starkville Academy, but the opposite occurred as many rural whites removed their children from private schools and enrolled in the new district schools, now 67% black. The merger marks the first time in the Mississippi consolidation movement that a failing district has been merged with a successful one, and that two districts of such extremely different racial makeup have been merged.

As a result of the merger, East Oktibbeha elementary school was closed because it would have been over 90% black and would not reflect the racial makeup of the district.

== Service area ==
The consolidated school district serves all of the county. The previous Starkville School District served Starkville, the Mississippi State University census-designated place, Longview, and some other unincorporated areas.

== Schools ==
Schools are in Starkville unless otherwise stated.

Secondary schools:

- Starkville High School
- Armstrong Junior High School
- Partnership Middle School at Mississippi State University serving all county students in grades 6 and 7.

Elementary schools:

- Henderson Intermediate School
- Overstreet Elementary School
- Sudduth Elementary School
  - 1993-1994 National Blue Ribbon School
- Ward-Stewart Elementary School
- West Oktibbeha Elementary School (Sturgis)

Preschool:

- Emerson Preschool

Alternative programs:

- East School (Starkville)

== Demographics ==
=== 2012-13 school year ===
There were a total of 4,310 students enrolled in the Starkville School District during the 2012–2013 school year. The gender makeup of the district was 49% female and 51% male. The racial makeup of the district was 64% African American, 31% White, 1% Hispanic, 3% Asian, and 0.3% other. 62% of the district's students were eligible to receive free lunch.

=== Previous school years ===
| School Year | Enrollment | Gender Makeup | | Racial Makeup | | | | | Free lunch eligible |
| School Year | Enrollment | Female | Male | Asian | African American | Hispanic | Native American | White | Free lunch eligible |
|---|---|---|---|---|---|---|---|---|---|
| 2012-13 | 4,310 | 49.2% | 50.8% | 3.37% | 63.76% | 1.35% | | 31.22% | 62% |
| 2011-12 | 4,097 | 48% | 51% | 3% | 64% | 1% | 0 | 30% | |
| 2010-11 | 4,097 | 49% | 50% | 2% | 64% | 1% | 0 | 30% | |
| 2009-10 | 4,128 | 48% | 51% | 2% | 64% | 1% | 0 | 31% | |
| 2008-09 | 4,207 | 48% | 51% | 2% | 64% | 1% | 0 | 31% | |
| 2007-08 | 4,075 | 48% | 51% | 2% | 64% | 1% | 0 | 30% | |
| 2006-07 | 4,089 | 49% | 51% | 2.64% | 64.76% | 1.05% | 0.39% | 31.16% | 57.8% |
| 2005-06 | 4,058 | 48% | 52% | 2.49% | 64.14% | 1.06% | 0.37% | 31.94% | ? |
| 2004-05 | 3,979 | 49% | 51% | 2.34% | 64.46% | 1.28% | 0.40% | 31.52% | ? |
| 2003-04 | 3,886 | 49% | 51% | 2.50% | 64.38% | 0.95% | 0.33% | 31.83% | ? |
| 2002-03 | 3,837 | 50% | 50% | 2.40% | 63.49% | 0.89% | 0.26% | 32.97% | |

== Accountability statistics ==
| | 2012-13 |
|---|---|
| District Accreditation Status | Accredited |
| District Accountability Status | C |
School Accoutability Status
| Level 5 (A) Schools | 0 |
| Level 4 (B) Schools | 1 |
| Level 3 (C) Schools | 2 |
| Level 2 (D) Schools | 1 |
| Level 1 (F) Schools | 0 |
| Not Assigned | 1 |
| High School Completion Index (HSCI) | 201.3 |
| Graduation Rate | 76.3% |

| | 2011-12 | 2010-11 | 2009-10 | 2008-09 |
|---|---|---|---|---|
| District Accreditation Status | Accredited | Accredited | Accredited | Accredited |
| District Accountability Status | Successful | Successful | Academic Watch | Academic Watch |
School Accoutability Status
| Level 6 (Star School) Schools | 0 | 0 | 0 | 0 |
| Level 5 (High Performing) Schools | 0 | 0 | 0 | 0 |
| Level 4 (Successful) Schools | 3 | 4 | 3 | 2 |
| Level 3 (Academic Watch) Schools | 1 | 0 | 1 | 0 |
| Level 2 (At Risk of Failing) Schools | 0 | 0 | 0 | 2 |
| Level 1 (Failing) Schools | 0 | 0 | 0 | 0 |
| Not Assigned | 1 | 1 | 1 | 1 |
| High School Completion Index (HSCI) | 153 | 178.3 | 118.5 | 155.5 |
| Graduation Rate | 71.8% | 69.8% | 60.4% | 72.1% |

| | 2006-07 | 2005-06 | 2004-05 | 2003-04 | 2002-03 |
|---|---|---|---|---|---|
| District Accreditation Status | Accredited | Accredited | Accredited | Accredited | Accredited |
School Performance Classifications
| Level 5 (Superior Performing) Schools | 0 | 0 | 0 | 0 | 0 |
| Level 4 (Exemplary) Schools | 1 | 1 | 1 | 1 | 1 |
| Level 3 (Successful) Schools | 4 | 3 | 4 | 4 | 4 |
| Level 2 (Under Performing) Schools | 0 | 1 | 0 | 0 | 0 |
| Level 1 (Low Performing) Schools | 0 | 0 | 0 | 0 | 0 |
| Not Assigned | 1 | 1 | 1 | 1 | 1 |

== See also ==
- List of school districts in Mississippi
