= National Register of Historic Places listings in Clay County, Mississippi =

Location of Clay County in Mississippi

This is a list of the National Register of Historic Places listings in Clay County, Mississippi.

This is intended to be a complete list of the properties and districts on the National Register of Historic Places in Clay County, Mississippi, United States. Latitude and longitude coordinates are provided for many National Register properties and districts; these locations may be seen together in a map.

There are 29 properties and districts listed on the National Register in the county, including 1 National Historic Landmark. Another property was once listed but has been removed.

This National Park Service list is complete through NPS recent listings posted October 30, 2026.

== Current listings ==
	Name on the Register	Image	Date listed	Location	City or town	Description
1	Dewitt Anderson House	Dewitt Anderson House	August 31, 1990 (#90001279)	104 W. Broad St. 33°36′15″N 88°39′02″W	West Point	
2	Brandtown Gin Historic District		November 15, 1991 (#91001634)	Mississippi Highway 47 at Brandtown, west of Prairie; 33°48′03″N 88°51′10″W	Prairie	
3	Brogan Mound and Village Site Discontiguous District		May 24, 1991 (#91000607)	Address restricted	West Point	
4	Clay County Agricultural High School	Clay County Agricultural High School	November 15, 1991 (#91001645)	160 College; 33°35′06″N 88°56′48″W	Pheba	
5	Colbert and Barton Townsites	Colbert and Barton Townsites	June 20, 1977 (#77000785)	Western bank of the Tombigbee River, northeast of West Point (Colbert); on a bluff over the western bank of the Tombigbee River, northeast of West Point (Barton); 33°37′50″N 88°30′15″W	West Point	
6	Commerce Street Historic District	Commerce Street Historic District	August 31, 1990 (#90001283)	508-731 Commerce St. 33°36′06″N 88°38′44″W	West Point	
7	Court Street Historic District		August 12, 1982 (#82004835)	Court Street between Travis and E. Broad Streets; 33°36′08″N 88°38′56″W	West Point	
8	East Main Street Historic District		August 31, 1990 (#90001282)	510-1030 E. Main St. 33°36′26″N 88°38′29″W	West Point	
9	Mary Holmes Junior College Historic District	Mary Holmes Junior College Historic District	November 15, 1991 (#91001637)	Mississippi Highway 50, west of its junction with U.S. Highway 45A; 33°36′29″N 88°39′55″W	West Point	
10	Charles R. Jordan House	Charles R. Jordan House	November 15, 1991 (#91001636)	82 Matthew Rd. 33°31′47″N 88°37′53″W	West Point	
11	Moses Jordan House	Moses Jordan House	August 31, 1990 (#90001278)	940 E. Broad St. 33°36′11″N 88°38′33″W	West Point	
12	Nathan Mathews House and Mathews Cotton Gin	Nathan Mathews House and Mathews Cotton Gin	November 15, 1991 (#91001638)	629 Mathews Gin Rd. 33°35′19″N 88°33′43″W	West Point	
13	Montpelier Historic District		November 15, 1991 (#91001639)	Junction of Mississippi Highways 46 and 389; 33°43′02″N 88°56′52″W	Montpelier	
14	Kenneth G. Neigh Dormitory Complex	Kenneth G. Neigh Dormitory Complex	January 28, 2021 (#100006106)	276 Mary Holmes Row; 33°36′33″N 88°40′05″W	West Point	
15	Pheba Historic District		November 15, 1991 (#91001640)	Pheba St. No. 2, just west of Mississippi Highway 389; 33°34′52″N 88°57′00″W	Pheba	
16	Powell-Vail House		November 15, 1991 (#91001641)	Eastern side of Vail Rd., 1.2 miles north of Mississippi Highway 50; 33°36′16″N 88°55′43″W	Pheba	
17	"Prairie Queen"		January 26, 2026 (#100012630)	2235 Lake Grove Road; 33°42′40″N 88°45′28″W	West Point	
18	South Division Street Historic District		August 31, 1990 (#90001281)	447-646 S. Division St. 33°36′03″N 88°39′02″W	West Point	
19	Tibbee Bridge	Tibbee Bridge	November 16, 1988 (#88002411)	Spans Tibbee Creek on Old Tibbee Rd. 33°32′17″N 88°38′00″W	West Point	
20	Tibbee School		November 15, 1991 (#91001642)	Tibbee-Columbus Rd., at Tibbee; 33°31′33″N 88°37′43″W	West Point	
21	Town of Palo Alto		August 20, 1987 (#87000473)	Mississippi Highway 47, northwest of West Point; 33°40′50″N 88°48′00″W	Palo Alto	
22	Turnage House	Turnage House	November 15, 1991 (#91001643)	1080 Turnage Rd. 33°43′18″N 88°54′41″W	Montpelier	
23	Una Consolidated School	Una Consolidated School	November 15, 1991 (#91001644)	3825 Brand-Una Rd. 33°47′45″N 88°47′10″W	Cedar Bluff	
24	Waide Archeological Site		July 27, 1999 (#99000842)	Address restricted	Palo Alto	
25	Waverley	Waverley	September 20, 1973 (#73001004)	10 miles east of West Point; 33°34′09″N 88°30′13″W	West Point	
26	Waverly Bridge	Waverly Bridge	March 20, 1989 (#88002412)	Spans the Tombigbee River on the Columbus and Greenville railroad line 33°33′54″N 88°29′48″W	Waverly	Extends into Lowndes County
27	West Point Central City Historic District	West Point Central City Historic District	June 1, 1982 (#82003099)	Mississippi Highway 50; 33°36′25″N 88°38′59″W	West Point	
28	West Point School Historic District		August 31, 1990 (#90001280)	Roughly bounded by E. Westbrook, Calhoun, Travis and East Sts. 33°36′04″N 88°38′37″W	West Point	
29	West Point Unified Historic District		December 1, 2009 (#09000784)	Roughly bounded by the rear property lines of resources along E. Main St. to the north, McCord St. to the west, and Forest St. Boundary increase (listed July 25, 2012, refnum 12000561): 117, 123, 133 West Broad St. 33°36′26″N 88°38′05″W	West Point	

== Former listing ==
	Name on the Register	Image	Date listed	Date removed	Location	City or town	Description
1	Robert L. Cooper House		November 15, 1991 (#91001635)	June 23, 2003	Mhoon Valley Rd., W of West Point	West Point	Disassembled in May 2002, and relocated to French Camp

== See also ==
- List of National Historic Landmarks in Mississippi
- National Register of Historic Places listings in Mississippi
