= Tibbee =

Tibbee may refer to:

- Tibbee Bridge, historic place inClay County, Mississippi, United States
- Tibbee Creek
- Tibbee, Mississippi
- Tibbee School

== See also ==
- Tibby
- Tibbie
