= Mississippi Highway 50 =

Highway in Mississippi

Mississippi Highway 50

Route information
- Maintained by MDOT
- Length: 58.530 mi (94.195 km)
- Existed: 1960–present

Major junctions
- West end: MS 9 in Walthall
- US 45 Alt. in West Point; US 45 in Columbus; US 82 in Columbus
- East end: SR 96 at the Alabama state line near Steens

Location
- Country: United States
- State: Mississippi
- Counties: Lowndes, Clay, Webster

Highway system
- Mississippi State Highway System; Interstate; US; State
← US 49W	→ US 51

Mississippi Highway 50 (MS 50) is a state highway in Mississippi. It generally follows an east/west track for 60 miles (97 km) and runs from MS 9 in Walthall, Mississippi, east to the Alabama state line east of Columbus. MS 50 serves the following Mississippi counties: Lowndes, Clay, and Webster.

== Route description ==
MS 50 begins in the North Central Hills region (part of the Appalachian Foothills) in Webster County at an intersection with MS 9 in the village of Walthall. It heads east as a two-lane highway through downtown, where it has an intersection with MS 784 (Main Street), before leaving Walthall and continuing east through rural areas for a few miles to an intersection with Clarkson Road and N Sappa Road, where state maintenance ends and the road winds its way east through remote wooded areas as Old Highway 50 and Avent Road (parts of which are unpaved dirt road). The county road passes through the community of Clarkson, where it briefly turns right onto Clarkson road, before turning left onto Abbott Road for half a mile, and then turning left onto Cole Road and leaving the community. Cole Road passes through a mix of farmland and woodlands for the next several miles, where it becomes paved as well as becoming Jackson Road, before coming to an intersection with Old Cumberland Road (CR 167). Here MS 50, as well as state maintenance, restarts and heads along Old Cumberland Road to cross under the Natchez Trace Parkway and enter the community of Cumberland. MS 50 passes straight down the center of the community, where it has an intersection with MS 765 (Natchez Trace Road, a connector to the parkway), before leaving Cumberland and coming to an intersection with MS 15. MS 50 becomes concurrent with MS 15 and they head south through woodlands for several miles before MS 50 splits off and continues east to cross into Clay County.

MS 50 now enters the Golden Triangle region and it passes through the community of Pheba, where it has an intersection with MS 389. The highway travels through the community of Cedar Bluff before having intersections with both MS 46 and MS 47 and entering the West Point city limits. MS 50 passes through some neighborhoods before having an intersection with US 45 Alternate/MS 25 and passing straight through downtown along Main Street. The highway now passes through more neighborhoods before leaving West Point and traveling east-southeast through farmland for several miles to the community of Waverly, where it crosses a bridge over the Tombigbee River (Tennessee Tombigbee Waterway) into Lowndes County.

MS 50 travels through wooded areas for several miles to become concurrent with MS 373 before coming to an intersection US 45, where MS 373 ends and MS 50 turns south along US 45. The highway enters the Columbus city limits as an undivided four-lane and soon passes through a long major business district for a few miles to come to an interchange with US 82 (unsigned MS 12) just north of downtown, with US 45 heading west along US 82, MS 50 heading east along US 82, and the road continuing into downtown as MS 69 (N 5th Street). US 82/MS 12/MS 50 head east along a four-lane freeway that bypasses the entire downtown area on its north side, having interchanges with 18th Avenue N and Military Road (as well as crossing Luxapallila Creek). MS 12/MS 50 split off from US 82 at an interchange with Tuscaloosa Road, heading east as a four-lane boulevard through a business district for not even a mile to an intersection where MS 12 splits off and heads north. MS 50 now narrows to two-lanes and leaves Columbus, traveling through farmland for several miles to come to the Alabama state line southeast of Steens, with the road continuing into Alabama as State Route 96 (SR 96).

== History ==
Mississippi Highway 10
- Location: Walthall–Columbus
- Existed: 1932–1960

MS 50 was originally designated in 1932 as Mississippi Highway 10 (MS 10). It was redesignated in 1960 as MS 50 to eliminate confusion with then newly constructed I-10.

== Major intersections ==
County	Location	mi	km	Destinations	Notes
Webster	Walthall	0.0	0.0	MS 9 – Calhoun City, Slate Springs, Eupora	Western terminus
Webster	Walthall	0.2	0.32	MS 784 (Main Street)	
Webster		2.7	4.3	Clarkson Road / N Sappa Road	
Webster		2.8	4.5	Old Highway 50	East end of pavement; east end of state maintenance
Gap in route
Webster	Cumberland	0.0	0.0	Cumberland Road	West end of state maintenance at Natchez Trace Parkway right-of-way (no access)
Webster	Cumberland	0.6	0.97	MS 765 west (Natchez Trace Parkway) to Natchez Trace Parkway	Eastern terminus of MS 765
Webster		1.4	2.3	MS 15 north – Houston	West end of MS 15 overlap
Webster		3.0	4.8	MS 15 south – Maben, Mathiston	East end of MS 15 overlap
Clay	Pheba	10.2	16.4	To MS 389 / Beasley Road / CR 389	
Clay	Cedar Bluff			Cedar Bluff Loop	Proposed MS 781
Clay		21.3	34.3	MS 46 west – Mantee, Montpelier	Eastern terminus of MS 46
Clay		22.5	36.2	MS 47 north – Abbot, Trebloc	Southern terminus of MS 47
Clay	West Point	27.5	44.3	US 45 Alt. / MS 25 – Tupelo, Meridian	
Lowndes		41.1	66.1	MS 373 north – Columbus Air Force Base	West end of MS 373 overlap
Lowndes		41.6	66.9	US 45 north – Aberdeen	Southern terminus of MS 373; west end of US 45 overlap
Lowndes	Columbus	45.5	73.2	US 45 south / US 82 west (MS 12 west) – Starkville, Meridian MS 69 south (N 5th Street) – Downtown Columbus	Interchange; west end of freeway; east end of US 45 overlap; west end of US 82/MS 12 overlap; northern terminus of MS 69
Lowndes	Columbus	46.1– 46.5	74.2– 74.8	18th Avenue N	
Lowndes	Columbus	47.2– 47.7	76.0– 76.8	Military Road	
Lowndes	Columbus	49.4	79.5	US 82 east – Tuscaloosa	Interchange; east end of freeway/US 82 overlap
Lowndes	Columbus	50.4	81.1	MS 12 east – Woodlawn, Caledonia	East end of MS 12 overlap
Lowndes		56.1	90.3	SR 96 east – Millport	Alabama state line; eastern terminus
1.000 mi = 1.609 km; 1.000 km = 0.621 mi: Concurrency terminus; Unopened
