= Mississippi Highway 47 =

Highway in Mississippi

Mississippi Highway 47
- MS 47 highlighted in red

Route information
- Maintained by MDOT
- Length: 23.048 mi (37.092 km)
- Existed: c. 1934–present

Major junctions
- South end: MS 50 west of West Point
- North end: MS 385 / Aberdeen Road near Buena Vista

Location
- Country: United States
- State: Mississippi
- Counties: Clay, Chickasaw

Highway system
- Mississippi State Highway System; Interstate; US; State
← MS 46	→ MS 48

Mississippi Highway 47 (MS 47) is a 23.048-mile-long (37.092 km) state highway located in the U.S. state of Mississippi. The route starts at MS 50 west of West Point in Clay County. The road then travels northwest through small communities in Clay and Chickasaw counties, and it intersects MS 8 in Trebloc, Chickasaw County. MS 47 ends at Aberdeen Road near Buena Vista, and the road continues as MS 385. The route was designated around 1934, from MS 10 (now MS 50) near West Point to MS 8 in Buena Vista, and MS 8 was rerouted south through Trebloc by 1944. MS 47 was fully paved by 1958.

== Route description ==
Traffic volume on Mississippi Highway 47
Location	Volume
North of Siloam–Griffith Road	720
Southeast of Amos Road	400
North of Brand–Una Road	660
South of MS 8	780
South of CRD 167	610
Data was measured in 2018 in terms of AADT; Source:

The route is located in Clay and southeastern Chickasaw counties. The route is legally defined in Mississippi Code § 65-3-3, and it is maintained by Mississippi Department of Transportation (MDOT) as part of the Mississippi State Highway System.

MS 47 starts at the intersection of MS 50 and Mhoon Road, and it begins traveling northwest. The road travels through a rural area of Clay County, and it turns west at Pea Ridge Road. The route enters the unincorporated area of Siloam, and it turns north at Siloam–Griffith Road. At Lake Grove Road and Harper Road, MS 47 turns west and travels through Abbott. At Palo Alto, the route turns northwest and travels along Long Branch. At Barr Road, MS 47 turns northeast and crosses over Houlka Creek past Sparta Road. The road intersects Brand–Una Road at Barrs Mill, and it enters Chickasaw County at County Line Road. In Chickasaw County, MS 47 intersects County Road 186 (CRD 186) at McCondy and turns north at MS 8 in Trebloc. The route meets CRD 166 west of Macedonia, and state maintenance ends at Aberdeen Road near Buena Vista. The road continues as MS 385, which travels into the Tombigbee National Forest.

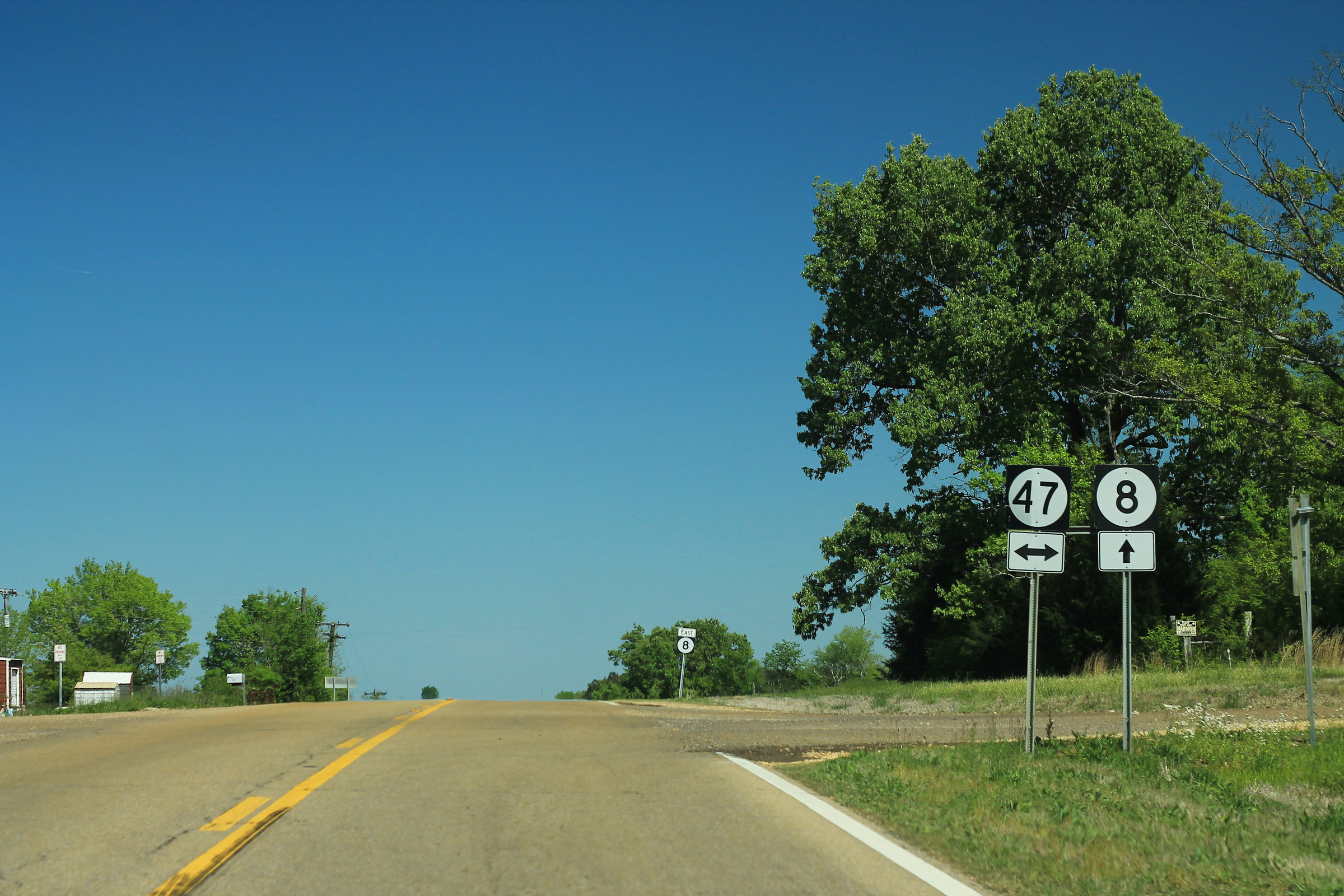
MS 47 and MS 8 in Trebloc

== History ==
The gravel road that became MS 47 has existed at least since 1928, from West Point to Houston. By 1934, the road was designated as MS 47, starting at MS 10 and ending at MS 8. MS 8 was rerouted south of Buena Vista to Trebloc by 1944, and the northern terminus of MS 47 remained at Buena Vista. A section of MS 47 near MS 10 was paved by 1953, and another from south of the Clay–Chickasaw county line to MS 8 by 1955. All of the route south of MS 8 was paved by 1957, and a new gravel road was constructed north of MS 47 to MS 32. The gravel road was designated as MS 385 one year later. After being proposed in July 1957, the section from Trebloc to Buena Vista was paved by 1958. MS 10 was renumbered to MS 50 by 1960.

== Major intersections ==
County	Location	mi	km	Destinations	Notes
Clay		0.0	0.0	MS 50 – Maben, West Point	Southern terminus
Chickasaw	Trebloc	20.1	32.3	MS 8 – Aberdeen, Houston	
Chickasaw		23.1	37.2	MS 385 north / Aberdeen Road	Northern terminus; southern terminus of MS 385
1.000 mi = 1.609 km; 1.000 km = 0.621 mi
