= Mississippi Highway 389 =

Highway in Mississippi

Mississippi Highway 389
- MS 389 highlighted in red

Route information
- Maintained by MDOT
- Length: 25.126 mi (40.436 km)
- Existed: c. 1957–present

Southern segment
- Length: 11.9 mi (19.2 km)
- South end: MS 182 in Starkville
- Major intersections: US 82 / MS 25 in Starkville
- North end: Pheba–Beasley Road south of Pheba

Northern segment
- Length: 13.2 mi (21.2 km)
- South end: MS 46 west of Montpelier
- Major intersections: Natchez Trace Parkway north of Sparta
- North end: MS 8 in Houston

Location
- Country: United States
- State: Mississippi
- Counties: Oktibbeha, Clay, Chickasaw

Highway system
- Mississippi State Highway System; Interstate; US; State
← MS 388	→ MS 391

Mississippi Highway 389 (MS 389) is a state highway that runs from south to north in the U.S. State of Mississippi. MS 389 currently exists in two sections. The southern section begins at MS 182 in Starkville. The road travels north out of the city, and crosses U.S. Route 82 (US 82) and MS 15. North of Starkville, the route continues northwestwards and ends at the Oktibbeha–Clay county line south of Pheba. The northern section starts at MS 46 west of Montpelier, and it travels north to cross the Natchez Trace Parkway in Chickasaw County. MS 389 ends at MS 8 in Houston.

MS 389 was designated in two segments around 1957, one from US 82 in Starkville to MS 50 in Pheba, and another from MS 46 west of Montpelier to MS 8 south of Houston. The route was realigned to connect directly to Houston ten years later. The route was fully paved in asphalt by 1971. The two sections were connected together by 1992, when the route was between MS 46 and MS 50. The same portion of the route was returned to county maintenance by 2000, along with the portion from the Oktibbeha–Clay County line to MS 50, leaving MS 389 in two segments again.

== Route description ==
Traffic volume on Mississippi Highway 389
Location	Volume
North of MS 182	9,900
South of Woodlawn Road	6,600
Southwest of Sun Creek Road	2,600
West of Murray Road	1,300
North of Maben Bell Schoolhouse Road	1,500
North of Hill Circle Road	1,100
North of CR 83	980
North of Seay Drive	2,200
South of Church Street	4,600
Data was measured in 2018 in terms of AADT; Source: Mississippi Department of Transportation

MS 389 is split in two segments, with one located in northern Oktibbeha, and the other in northwestern Clay and southern Chickasaw counties. The route is legally defined in Mississippi Code § 65-3-3, and it is maintained by the Mississippi Department of Transportation as part of the Mississippi State Highway System.

MS 389 starts at its intersection with MS 182, also known as Dr. Martin Luther King Jr. Drive, and Jackson Street near downtown Starkville. The route, continuing as Jackson Street, travels north into the suburbs around the city, and intersects the entrance to Montcrief Park. MS 389 then intersects Hospital Road, which leads to several medical facilities, including the Oktibbeha County Hospital. The road turns northwest at Garrard Road, traveling into the outskirts of Starkville. The road then crosses US 82 and MS 25 at a diamond interchange, and exits the city limits of Starkville. Traveling through rural areas of Oktibbeha County, the route crosses Trim Cane Creek near Sun Creek Road, which travels to the unincorporated area of Plairs. MS 389 turns westward at Bells and continues in that direction until it reaches County Lake Road. At Maben Bell Schoolhouse Road, it resumes traveling north. The road crosses the Clay–Oktibbeha county line at Six Mile Creek, and state maintenance ends north of the bridge. The road continues as Pheba–Beasley Road, which travels through Pheba and ends at MS 46 in Beasley.

The northern segment starts at a T-intersection with MS 46 west of Montpelier in Clay County, and it travels north-northwestwards from that point. The road intersects Hill Circle Road before entering Chickasaw County. Once inside the county, the route meets County Road 419 (CR 419) at Sparta. MS 389 turns north at CR 83, and crosses Cane Creek and its tributary, Chewawah Creek. Continuing across farmland, the road turns northwest near CR 85, and crosses over the Natchez Trace Parkway at a quadrant roadway intersection. MS 389 turns north at CR 80, and it travels through the community of Sonora near CR 93. The route passes by CR 108, which connects to MS 15. MS 389 enters the city limits of Houston near CR 106. Inside the city, the road is known as West Point Road, and it travels towards the center of the town. At its five-way intersection with McWhorter Street, South Jackson Street, and Woodland Circle, the route continues northward along South Jackson Street. MS 389 travels northwards and ends at MS 8 at the center of Houston. The road continues as North Jackson Street, which travels to MS 15 north of Houston.

== History ==
In May 1955, a project was announced to construct culverts and a temporary 3.458-mile (5.565 km) gravel road from Houston to Montpelier, with the road given the designation of MS 389. A surfacing project began in November 1956 for the same section. Around 1957, the MS 389 designation appeared along two roads in eastern Mississippi; one from US 82 and MS 25 in Starkville to MS 10 in Pheba, and another from MS 46 near Montpelier to MS 15 south of Houston. The sections near Pheba and in Chickasaw County were paved in asphalt, and the remaining sections were laid with gravel. MS 10 was renumbered to MS 50 by 1960, and projects to construct three bridges and for grading, drainage, and gravel surfacing along 3.4-mile (5.5 km) section of MS 389 in Oktibbeha County began. A section of Natchez Trace Parkway was constructed through MS 389 by 1962. The southern segment from Starkville to Pheba was paved by 1965, after the $435,607 (equivalent to $3,590,953 in 2019) project was announced in the previous year.

Two years later, the road was rerouted into Houston, and a small section near Montpelier was paved. The entire route was paved in asphalt by 1971. The two segments were connected by 1992 with a new route between MS 50 and MS 46. In May 2000, the section from the Clay–Oktibbeha county line to Montpelier was removed from the state highway system, and it was turned over to the Board of Supervisors of Clay County. By 2004, a bypass around Starkville was completed, and US 82 and MS 25 were rerouted onto the new highway. A new interchange was built at MS 389 as a result, and the southern terminus of the southern segment was changed to MS 182.

== Major intersections ==
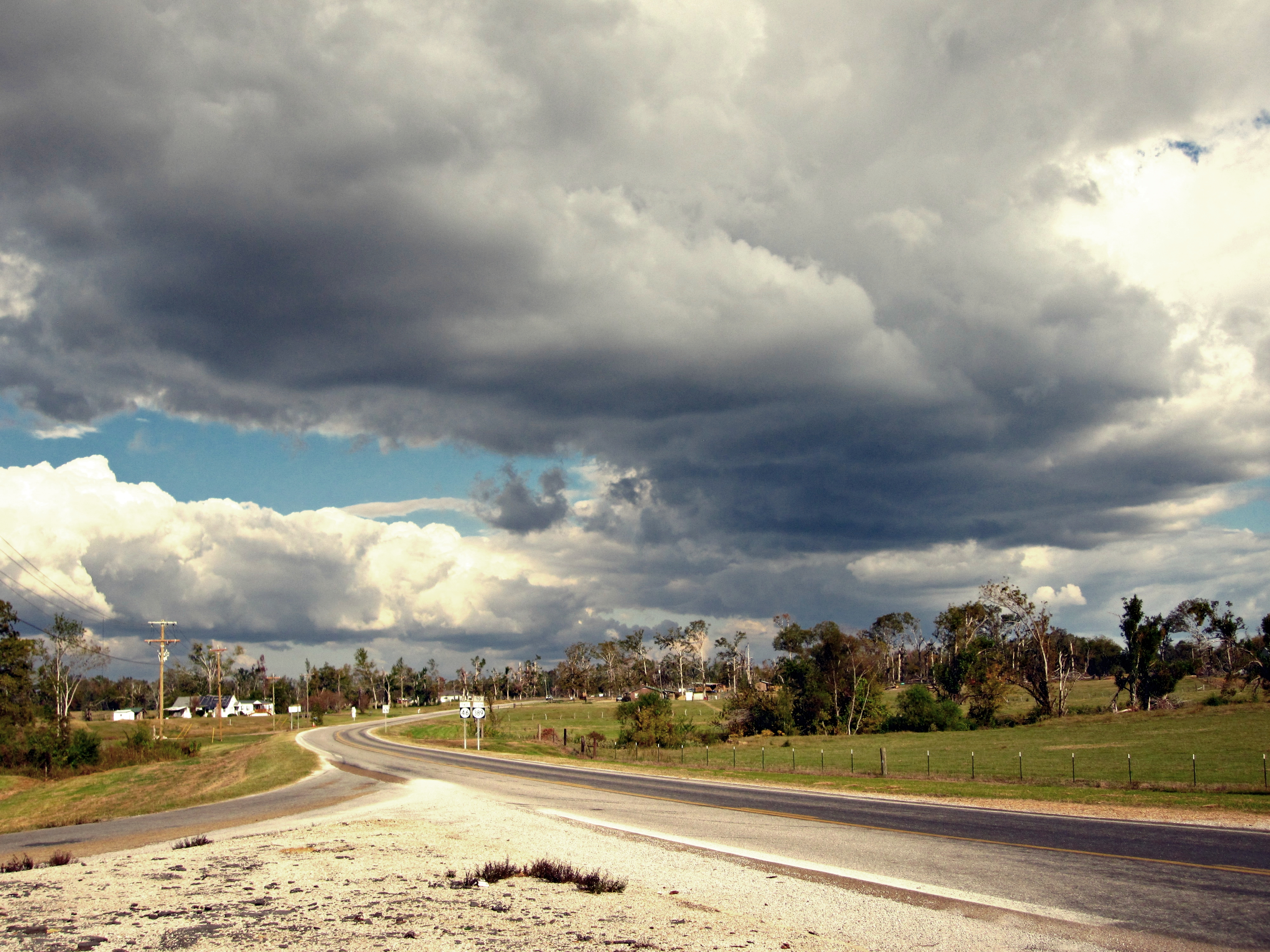
Intersection of MS 46 and MS 389 near Montpelier

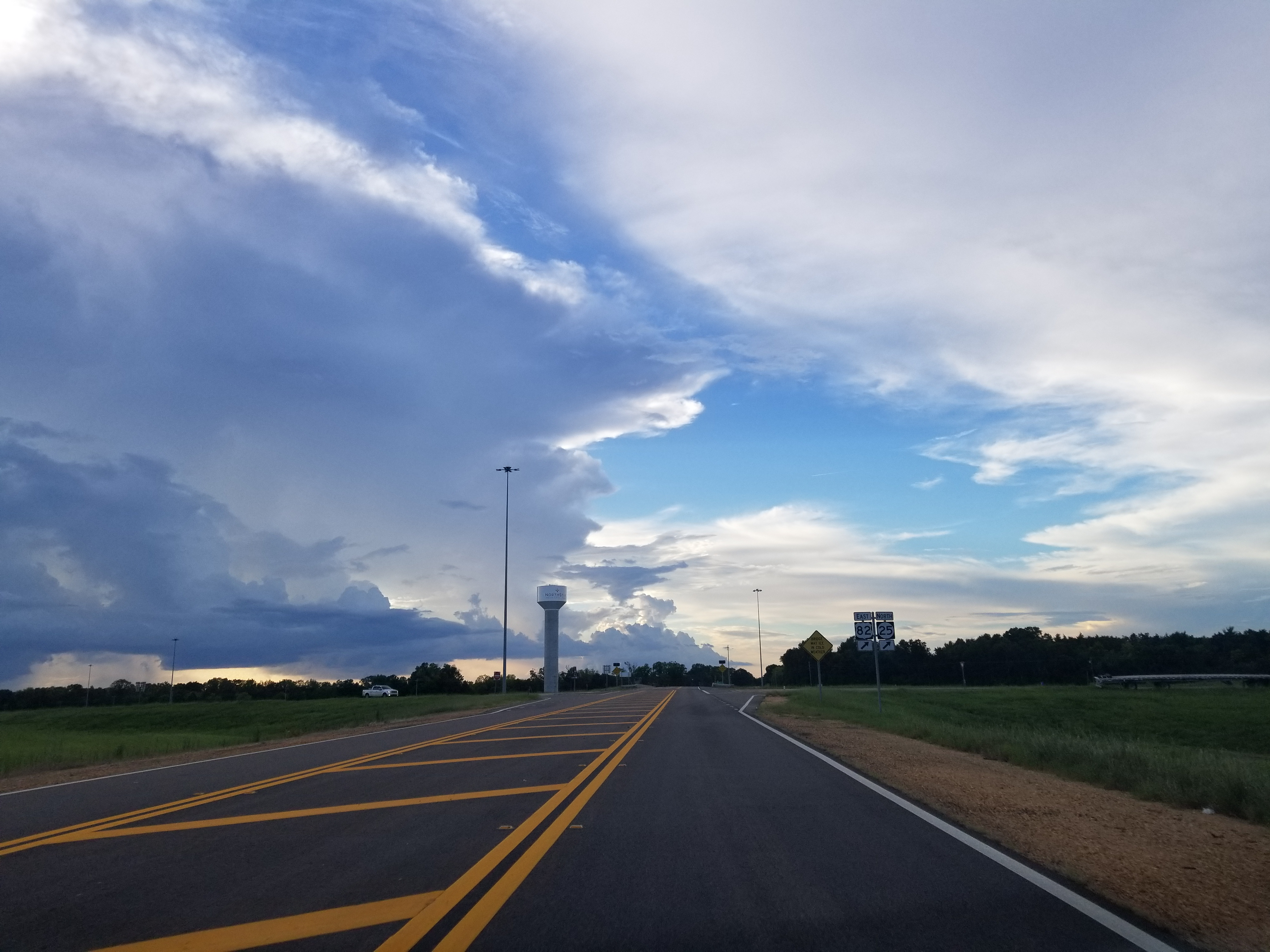
MS 389 approaching the interchange with US 82 and MS 25 near Starkville

County	Location	mi	km	Destinations	Notes
Oktibbeha	Starkville	0.0	0.0	MS 182 (Dr. Martin Luther King Jr. Drive)	Southern terminus of the southern section
Oktibbeha	Starkville	2.1– 2.3	3.4– 3.7	US 82 / MS 25	Diamond interchange
Oktibbeha–Clay county line		11.9	19.2	Pheba–Beasley Road	Northern terminus of the southern section
Gap in route
Clay		11.9	19.2	MS 46 – Montpelier, Starkville, Mantee	Southern terminus of the northern section
Chickasaw		19.7	31.7	Natchez Trace Parkway – Tupelo, Jackson	Grade-separated interchange
Chickasaw	Houston	25.1	40.4	MS 8 (Madison Street) to MS 15 – Aberdeen, Grenada, Vardaman	Northern terminus of the northern section
1.000 mi = 1.609 km; 1.000 km = 0.621 mi
