= Mississippi Highway 385 =

Highway in Mississippi

Mississippi Highway 385

Route information
- Maintained by Chickasaw County
- Length: 11.008 mi (17.716 km)

Major junctions
- South end: MS 47 / Aberdeen Road in Buena Vista
- North end: MS 32 in Van Vleet

Location
- Country: United States
- State: Mississippi
- Counties: Chickasaw

Highway system
- Mississippi State Highway System; Interstate; US; State
← MS 382	→ MS 388

Mississippi Highway 385 (MS 385) is an 11.150-mile-long (17.944 km) unsigned state highway located entirely within Chickasaw County in the U.S. State of Mississippi. The entire length of MS 385 is maintained by Chickasaw County. MS 385's southern terminus is at the northern terminus of MS 47 and Aberdeen Road in Buena Vista and the northern terminus is at MS 32 in Van Vleet.

== Route description ==
MS 385 starts at MS 47 and County Road 406 (CR 406) in Buena Vista, and travels northward along CR 402. The road turns northwest, and it intersects CR 159. The road transitions into a gravel road after passing through several houses. The road enters the Tombigbee National Forest, and it turns northeast past CR 163. It leaves the forest and begins traveling through farmland again. At CR 151, it turns west and continues along CR 402. At its intersection with CR 217 and CR 412, MS 385 turns northwest, ending its concurrency with CR 402. The road transitions back to an asphalt road after crossing Dicks Creek. North of CR 213, the road turns west and enters Van Vleet. At CR 164, the road turns north and enters the center of the community. MS 385 ends at MS 32, and the road continues north as part of MS 32.

== Major intersections ==
The entire route is in Chickasaw County.

Location	mi	km	Destinations	Notes
Buena Vista	0.000	0.000	MS 47 south	Continuation past Aberdeen Road; northern terminus of MS 47
Buena Vista	0.000	0.000	Aberdeen Road	Southern terminus
Van Vleet	11.008	17.716	MS 32	Northern terminus
1.000 mi = 1.609 km; 1.000 km = 0.621 mi
