= Montpelier Historic District (Montpelier, Mississippi) =

Historic district in Mississippi, United States

- U.S. National Register of Historic Places
- U.S. Historic district
- Location within Mississippi Location within the United States
- Location: Jct. of MS 389 and MS 46, Montpelier, Mississippi
- Coordinates: 33°43′2″N 88°56′52″W
- Built: 1886
- Architectural style: Vernacular Victorian
- MPS: Clay County MPS
- NRHP reference No.: 91001639
- Added to NRHP: November 15, 1991

Montpelier Historic District, the center of the unincorporated community of Montpelier, Mississippi in Clay County, Mississippi, is a 2.5-acre (1.0 ha) historic district that was listed on the National Register of Historic Places in 1991.

Located at the intersection of Mississippi Highway 46 and Mississippi Highway 389, the district included (as of 1989) three contributing buildings and one non-contributing building.

The contributing buildings are the c. 1886 house of the town's founder, C.C. Cross, his c. 1891 store, and another c. 1891 store building that held the post office. The buildings are not distinctive architecturally and are made of wood-frame construction with simple details. They are, however, good examples of "commonplace late 19th and early 20th century life and building practice."

And the district, compared to alternatives covered in a study, was deemed the "best remaining example of a commercial center important for its location on the roads which allowed for the development of an expanding agricultural economy in the areas not served by railroad lines."

Turnage House, on Turnage Road, in or near Montpelier, is "significant as the best remaining example in Clay County of the early 20th century double-pen dogtrot house."
