= Tibbie =

Tibbie may refer to:

- Tibbie, Alabama, a census-designated place
- Isabel Pagan (c. 1740 – 1821), also known as "Tibbie", Scottish poet of the Romantic Era
- Tibbie Tamson, Scottish woman whose grave is a landmark in Selkirk
- Tibbie Shiel (1783–1878), Scottish innkeeper
- Isabella Steven or Tibbie Stein, farmer's daughter associated with Robert Burns
- Tibbie Stakes, a Newcastle Jockey Club Group 3 Thoroughbred horse race
- Tibbetts Award ("Tibbie"), an American award made annually to small firms, projects, organizations, and individuals
- Tibbie, a she-goat character in the TV series Pleasant Goat and Big Big Wolf

== See also ==
- Tibbi
- Tibi (disambiguation)
- Tiby
- Tibby
- Tibbee (disambiguation)
