= Clay County Agricultural High School =

Historic high school building in Pheba, Mississippi

- U.S. National Register of Historic Places
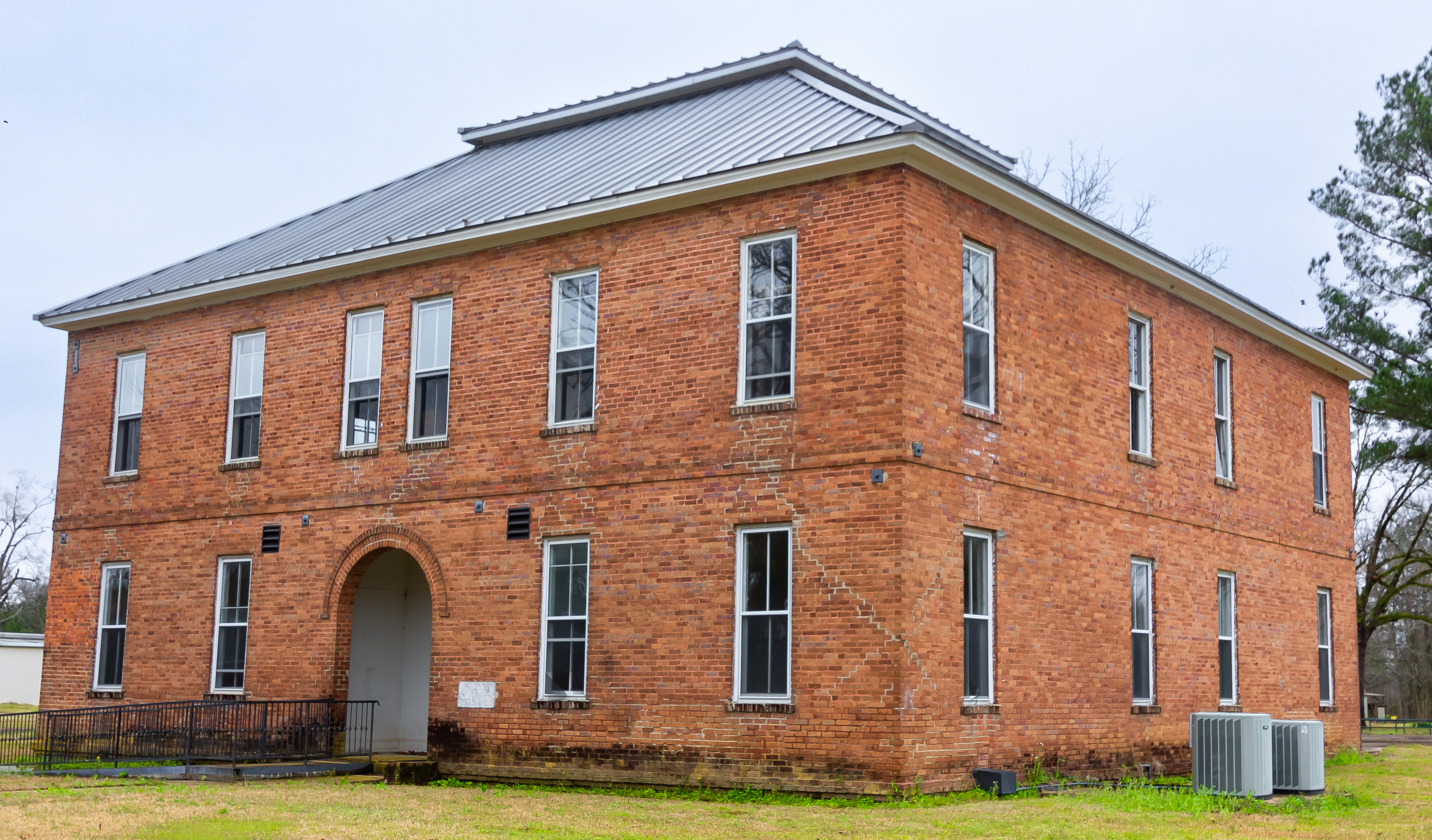
- Main building

- Location within Mississippi
- Location: Between Pheba Sts. Nos. 7 and 8, S of MS 50, Pheba, Mississippi
- Coordinates: 33°35′06″N 88°56′48″W
- Area: 2 acres (0.81 ha)
- Architectural style: Bungalow/Craftsman, Vernacular Craftsman
- MPS: Clay County MPS
- NRHP reference No.: 91001645
- Added to NRHP: November 15, 1991

Clay County Agricultural High School, also known as Pheba High School and West Clay County Agricultural School, was an agricultural high school in Pheba, Mississippi. Its main building survives. A two-story dormitory building was demolished in 2009. The buildings are listed on the National Register of Historic Places and are Mississippi Landmarks.

== History ==
In 1908 Mississippi passed laws establishing public agricultural high schools that operated as co-educational boarding schools to address educational needs in rural areas. Male students were taught how to farm and females how to be farmer's wives. In 1916 the system was phased out in favor of consolidated schools and school busing. The agricultural schools became community colleges or high schools.

== See also ==
- National Register of Historic Places listings in Clay County, Mississippi
