= Mantee =

Mantee may refer to:

- Mantee, Mississippi, a village
- Paul Mantee (1931-2013), American actor
- Duke Mantee, the villain of the film The Petrified Forest, played by Humphrey Bogart
