= F. M. Abbott =

American politician

Member of the Mississippi Senate from the Clay County district
- In office 1870–1874

Personal details
- Born: c. 1843 Chautauqua County, New York, U.S.
- Died: September 17, 1908 (aged 64–65) Selma, Alabama, U.S.
- Party: Republican
- Spouse: Gertrude E. Henry (m. 1870)
- Children: 1

Francis Marion Abbott (c. 1843 - September 17, 1908) was an American railroad officer and politician who founded Abbott, Mississippi. The Clarion-Ledger identified Abbott and Finis H. Little as Radical Republican state senator elects in 1869.

== Biography ==
Abbott was born near Chautauqua, New York circa 1843, one of nine children of farmer and merchant Harry Abbott (born 1800) and his wife, Louisa Bostwick. In his childhood, Abbott moved to Warren, Pennsylvania, where he attended the Union School.

He settled in Aberdeen, Mississippi after the American Civil War, and moved to a plantation on Clay County a year later. He served in appointed county supervisor. He served in the Mississippi State Senate from 1870 to 1874. His state senate seat was declared vacant because of prohibitions against holding two state offices. In 1878, he founded the town of Abbott, Mississippi, near his plantation.

He was an officer in a railroad company, and was involved in the railroad's expansion to the Clay County area. In 1900, Abbott moved to Selma, Alabama, where he was involved in the expansion of railroads there. He died on September 17, 1908, in DuBose's Sanitarium in Selma.

== Personal life ==
Abbott married Gertrude E. Henry in 1870. They had one daughter, named Mabel H.
