= Mississippi Highway 46 =

Highway in Mississippi

Mississippi Highway 46

Route information
- Maintained by MDOT
- Length: 23.234 mi (37.391 km)
- Existed: c. 1944–present

Major junctions
- West end: Mantee Road in Mantee
- MS 15 in Mantee; Natchez Trace Parkway near Mantee; MS 389 near Montpelier
- East end: MS 50 west of West Point

Location
- Country: United States
- State: Mississippi
- Counties: Webster, Clay

Highway system
- Mississippi State Highway System; Interstate; US; State
← US 45 Alt.	→ MS 47

Mississippi Highway 46 (MS 46) is a state highway located in the U.S. State of Mississippi. The western terminus of the route is at the western terminus of MS 782 in Mantee in Webster County and the eastern terminus is at MS 50 west of West Point in Clay County. Along the way, MS 46 intersects MS 15 in Mantee and then the Natchez Trace Parkway east of Mantee.

== Route description ==
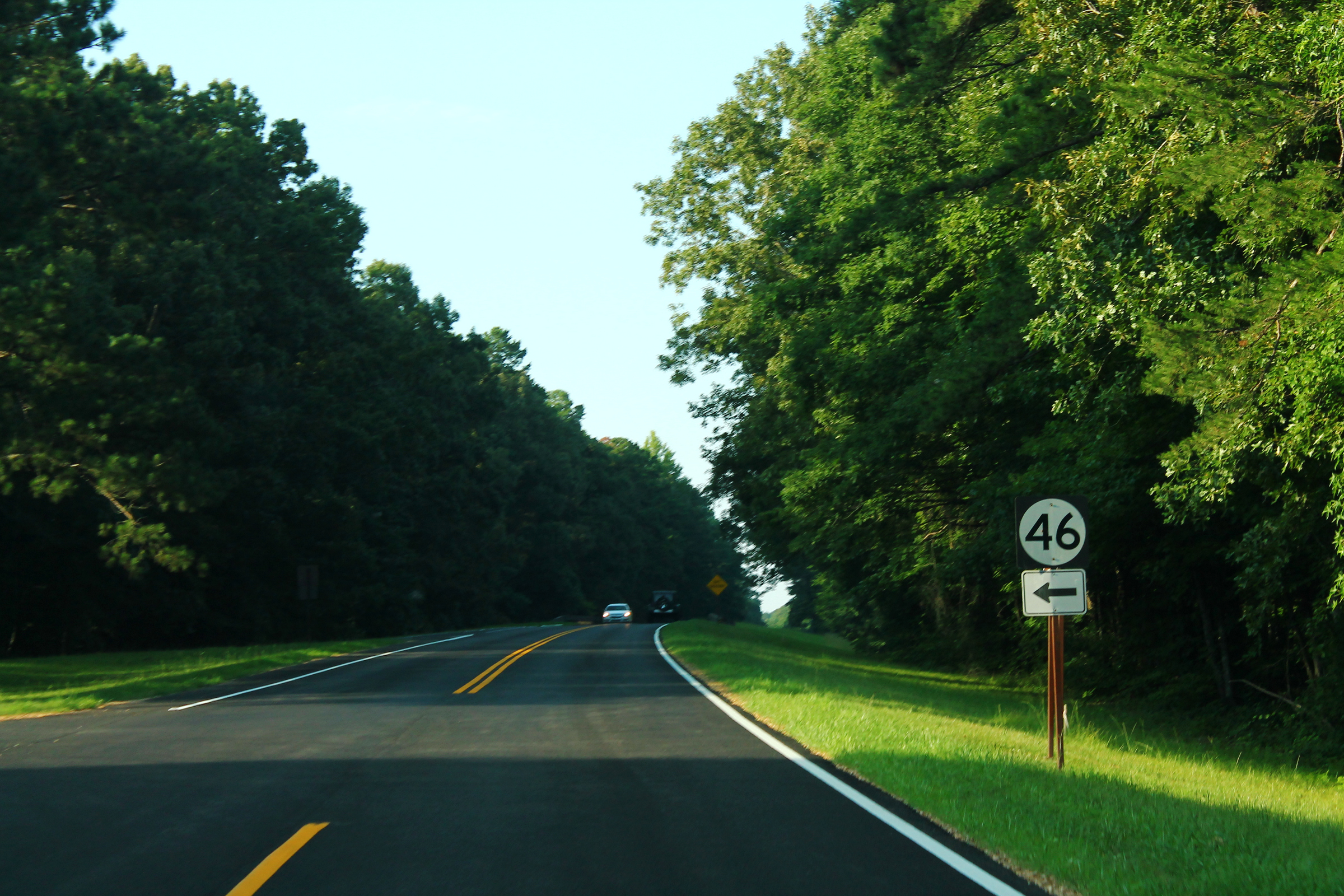
MS 46 at Natchez Trace Parkway

MS 46 begins in Webster County at the western edge of the Mantee village limits, at fork in the road between a private gravel road and Mantee Road. The highway heads east as a two-lane highway, known as Main Street, through a neighborhood before making a sharp left turn at an intersection with MS 782 in downtown. It passes north through downtown before curving back eastward to have an intersection with MS 15. The highway now leaves Mantee and heads east through farmland to cross into Clay County, just prior to its interchange with the Natchez Trace Parkway.

MS 46 now enters the Golden Triangle region as it passes through wooded areas for several miles before having an intersection with MS 389 and entering Montpelier. It makes a sharp right in the center of the community before leaving Montpelier and winding its way southeast through farmland for several miles to pass through Beasley, where the former central section of MS 389 (Pheba-Beasley Road) departs southward toward Pheba. The highway travels southeast through a mix of rural farmland and woodlands for several miles before MS 46 comes to an end at an intersection with MS 50 just five miles west of West Point.

== Future ==
Future plans call for MS 46 being extended west from Mantee into Calhoun County, where it will end at an intersection with MS 9.

== Major intersections ==
County	Location	mi	km	Destinations	Notes
Calhoun				MS 8 / MS 9	Proposed
Webster	Mantee	0.00	0.00	Mantee Road west	Continuation beyond western terminus at Mantee village limits; west end state maintenance
Webster	Mantee	1.3	2.1	Mantee Road east (MS 782 east)	Western terminus of MS 782
Webster	Mantee	1.6	2.6	MS 15	
Clay		2.7	4.3	Natchez Trace Parkway	Grade-separated interchange
Clay		7.6	12.2	MS 389 north – Houston	Southern terminus of MS 389
Clay		23.2	37.3	MS 50 – West Point, Maben	Eastern terminus; road continues south as L.W. Harper Road
1.000 mi = 1.609 km; 1.000 km = 0.621 mi: Unopened
