= Finis H. Little =

19th-century American politician from Mississippi

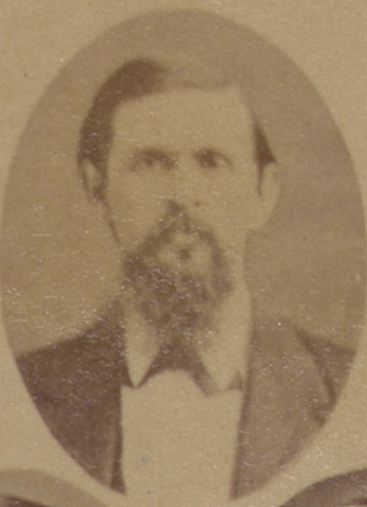
- c. 1874

16th President pro tempore of the Mississippi State Senate
- In office January 21, 1874 – June 3, 1875
- Preceded by: Joseph Bennett
- Succeeded by: John M. Stone

Member of the Mississippi Senate from the 22nd district
- In office January 1870 – January 1876

Personal details
- Died: February 5, 1880 Aberdeen, Mississippi, US
- Party: Republican

Finis H. Little (died February 5, 1880) was a state legislator in Mississippi. A Republican, he served during the Reconstruction era. He served with F. M. Abbott from the 22nd District. He served as president pro tem of the state senate and chaired its finance committee.

He was raised in Calhoon, Kentucky. He was the third son of Judge Douglas Little, and his brother was Judge L. P. Little.

He served as an officer with a unit of the Union Army from Kentucky during the American Civil War.

He represented Chickasaw County in the Mississippi State Senate from 1870 to 1876.

According to one account, he was part of a planned march of African American Republicans that was faced down by armed white supremacists allied with the Democratic Party. In 1875 he wrote seeking protection for Republican voters in areas where they were a great majority, expressing his expectation of intimidation and Democratic Party control over polling. In 1875 he also conveyed a message from the Republican Caucus of Mississippi to President Ulysses Grant seeking a change in the federal official overseeing U.S. Marshals in the area. He described how whites in Aberdeen, Mississippi in Monroe County welcomed Klansmen home as heroes and lawyers offered them their services in defense against federal prosecution.

Little died of consumption in Aberdeen, Mississippi, on February 5, 1880.

== See also ==
- Mississippi Plan
