= Chuquatonchee Creek =

Natural watercourse in Clay County, Mississippi, United States of America

Chuquatonchee Creek is a stream in Chickasaw, Clay and Pontotoc counties in the U.S. state of Mississippi. It is a tributary to Tibbee Creek.

The stream headwaters arise at 34°07′20″N 89°01′09″W and the confluence with Line Creek to form Tibbee Creek is at 33°34′07″N 88°41′47″W.

== Name ==
Chuquatonchee Creek is a name derived from the Choctaw language meaning "hog corn", a reference to a place where hogs were fattened.

The Board on Geographic Names settled on "Chuquatonchee Creek" as the river's official name and spelling in 1966. According to the Geographic Names Information System, the Chuquatonchee Creek has also been known as: Chackawlatoher River, Chookahtonkchie Creek, Chookaloukchee Creek, Chookatonchee Creek, Chookatonchie Creek, Chookatonkchie Creek, Chookatoukche Creek, Chookatoukchee Creek, Chooktonkchie Creek, Chuc-ka-t Creek, Chuc-ka-tonk-chy Creek, Chuckatonchee Creek, Chuckatuchee River, Chuhahtunckchch Creek, Holladay Creek, Loohaton Creek, Loohattan Creek, Oakibbihaw River, Sakatonchee Creek, Sakatonchee River, Sakatonchie River, Sookatonchee River, and Suquatonchee Creek.
