= West Point Consolidated School District =

School district in Mississippi

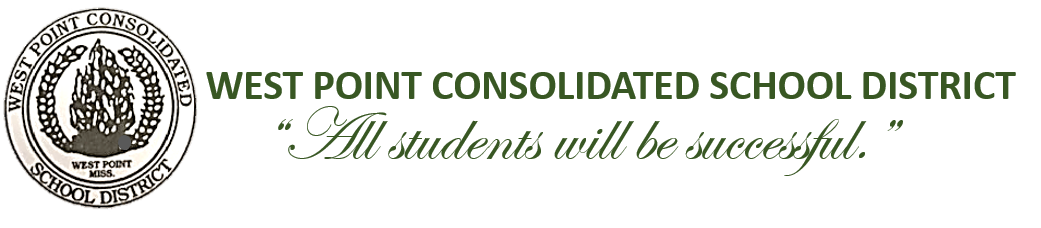

The West Point Consolidated School District (WPCSD), formerly the West Point School District, is a public school district based in West Point, Mississippi (USA).

Its boundaries parallel those of Clay County.

Effective July 1, 2015 the West Point School District and the Clay County School District was consolidated into the West Point Consolidated School District.

== Schools ==
Schools are in West Point unless otherwise noted.

- West Point High School (Grades 8-12)
  - West Point Career & Technology Center
- Fifth Street School (Grades 5-7)
- West Clay Elementary School (grades K-6) – Cedar Bluff
- South Side Elementary School (Grades 3-4)
- Church Hill Elementary School (Grades 1-2)
- East Side Elementary School (Pre-Kindergarten and Kindergarten)

Former schools:

- Central Middle School (Grades 5-6)
- Catherine Bryan School (Pre-Kindergarten & Special Education)
- West Side School (Grades K-12)

== Demographics ==
=== 2007-08 school year ===
There were a total of 3,451 students enrolled in the West Point School District during the 2007–2008 school year. The gender makeup of the district was 50% female and 50% male. The racial makeup of the district was 79.83% African American, 19.33% White, 0.64% Hispanic, 0.17% Asian, and 0.03% Native American.

=== Previous school years ===
| School Year | Enrollment | Gender Makeup | | Racial Makeup | | | | |
| School Year | Enrollment | Female | Male | Asian | African American | Hispanic | Native American | White |
|---|---|---|---|---|---|---|---|---|
| 2006-07 | 3,510 | 50% | 50% | 0.06% | 79.54% | 0.57% | – | 19.83% |
| 2005-06 | 3,649 | 50% | 50% | 0.19% | 78.93% | 0.66% | – | 20.22% |
| 2004-05 | 3,601 | 50% | 50% | 0.22% | 78.89% | 0.39% | 0.06% | 20.44% |
| 2003-04 | 3,715 | 50% | 50% | 0.16% | 77.98% | 0.40% | – | 21.45% |
| 2002-03 | 3,678 | 50% | 50% | 0.14% | 77.79% | 0.38% | – | 21.70% |

== Accountability statistics ==
| | 2007-08 | 2006-07 | 2005-06 | 2004-05 | 2003-04 | 2002-03 |
|---|---|---|---|---|---|---|
| District Accreditation Status | Accredited | Accredited | Accredited | Accredited | Accredited | Accredited |
School Performance Classifications
| Level 5 (Superior Performing) Schools | No School; Performance; Classifications; Assigned | 0 | 0 | 0 | 0 | 0 |
| Level 4 (Exemplary) Schools | No School; Performance; Classifications; Assigned | 2 | 1 | 0 | 1 | 1 |
| Level 3 (Successful) Schools | No School; Performance; Classifications; Assigned | 2 | 3 | 4 | 3 | 2 |
| Level 2 (Under Performing) Schools | No School; Performance; Classifications; Assigned | 0 | 0 | 0 | 0 | 1 |
| Level 1 (Low Performing) Schools | No School; Performance; Classifications; Assigned | 0 | 0 | 0 | 0 | 0 |
| Not Assigned | No School; Performance; Classifications; Assigned | 2 | 2 | 3 | 3 | 2 |

== Sports facts ==
1982 Class 2A state football champions

1987 Class 4A state baseball champions

1987 Class 4A state football champions

1988 Class 4A state football champions

1989 Class 5A state football champions

2005 Class 4A state football champions

2009 Class 5A state football champions

2010 Class 5A state football champions

2016 Class 5A state football champions

2017 Class 5A state football champions

2018 Class 5A state football champions

2019 Class 5A state football champions

== See also ==
- List of school districts in Mississippi
