= Shakerag =

Shake rag or Shakerag may refer to:

- A cloth held out as a signal for example to stop a train
- An unkempt and disreputable person (archaic usage) according to Merriam-Webster. Similar to a tatterdemalion
- Shake Rag, Mississippi
- Shakerag, Georgia, also known as Sheltonville, a community in Johns Creek, Georgia
- Shakerag or Shake Rag, a neighborhood in Bowling Green, Kentucky that is now home to the Shake Rag Historic District
- Shakerag, a racetrack and early name for the surrounding area of what is now part of Melrose, Florida
- Shake Rag, a historically African American community in Tupelo, Mississippi east of the old M&O (later GM&O) railway tracks and north from Main Street
