= Clay County School District (Mississippi) =

Defunct school district in the United States

The Clay County School District was a public school district based in Clay County, Mississippi (USA). An elementary-only district, it was the smallest school district in the state of Mississippi, with a total student enrollment of 173 during the 2006–2007 school year.

Effective July 1, 2015 it was consolidated into the West Point Consolidated School District.

== Schools ==
- West Clay Elementary School (Cedarbluff; Grades K-6)

== Demographics ==
=== 2006-07 school year ===
There were a total of 173 students enrolled in the Clay County School District during the 2006–2007 school year. The gender makeup of the district was 42% female and 58% male. The racial makeup of the district was 92.49% African American, 5.78% White, and 1.73% Hispanic. 91.2% of the district's students were eligible to receive free lunch.

=== Previous school years ===
| School Year | Enrollment | Gender Makeup | | Racial Makeup | | | | |
| School Year | Enrollment | Female | Male | Asian | African American | Hispanic | Native American | White |
|---|---|---|---|---|---|---|---|---|
| 2005-06 | 182 | 43% | 57% | – | 92.86% | – | – | 7.14% |
| 2004-05 | 196 | 42% | 58% | – | 93.88% | – | – | 6.12% |
| 2003-04 | 228 | 43% | 57% | – | 92.11% | – | – | 7.89% |
| 2002-03 | 236 | 44% | 56% | – | 92.80% | – | – | 7.20% |

== Accountability statistics ==
| | 2006-07 | 2005-06 | 2004-05 | 2003-04 | 2002-03 |
|---|---|---|---|---|---|
| District Accreditation Status | Accredited | Accredited | Accredited | Accredited | Accredited |
School Performance Classifications
| Level 5 (Superior Performing) Schools | 1 | 0 | 0 | 0 | 0 |
| Level 4 (Exemplary) Schools | 0 | 1 | 0 | 0 | 0 |
| Level 3 (Successful) Schools | 0 | 0 | 1 | 1 | 1 |
| Level 2 (Under Performing) Schools | 0 | 0 | 0 | 0 | 0 |
| Level 1 (Low Performing) Schools | 0 | 0 | 0 | 0 | 0 |
| Not Assigned | 0 | 0 | 0 | 0 | 0 |

== See also ==
- List of school districts in Mississippi
