= Ambrose Henderson =

Ambrose Henderson was a Baptist minister, state legislator, and officer in the Chickasaw County militia in Mississippi. He served in the Mississippi House of Representatives in 1870 and 1871 during the Reconstruction era.

Henderson was born in Chapel Hill, North Carolina. W. G. Henderson was his slaveowner.

He and A. P. Thattuck were elected to the state house from Chickasaw County in 1869.

The Weekly Mississippi Pilot mocked his letter to Governor Alcorn regarding the nomination of W. G. Henderson to a judgeship.

In 1872 he campaigned for support among the black majority in his district.
