= Tibby Creek =

Tibby Creek may refer to:

- Tibby Creek (Noxubee River tributary), a stream in Mississippi
- Tibby Creek (Yockanookany River tributary), a stream in Mississippi

== See also ==
- Tibbee Creek
