= Thompson McClellan =

American attorney and politician

Member of the Mississippi House of Representatives from Clay County
- In office 1956–1968
- Preceded by: Frank A. Critz Jr.
- Succeeded by: Wyndell Carty
- In office 1932–1936
- Preceded by: Charles C. Wilsford
- Succeeded by: Byron H. Loving
- In office 1924–1928
- Preceded by: J. J. Valentine
- Succeeded by: Charles C. Wilsford

Personal details
- Born: August 11, 1899 West Point, Mississippi, U.S.
- Died: February 24, 1975 (aged 75) West Point, Mississippi, U.S.
- Party: Democratic

Military service
- Allegiance: United States
- Branch/service: United States Army
- Rank: Private
- Battles/wars: World War I

Thompson McClellan (August 11, 1899 – February 24, 1975) was an American attorney and politician who served in the Mississippi House of Representatives. He represented Clay County on three occasions: first from 1924 to 1928, then from 1932 to 1936, and finally from 1956 to 1968. He was previously mayor of West Point from 1946 to 1953.

Mississippi House of Representatives
Preceded by J. J. Valentine; Charles C. Wilsford; Frank A. Critz Jr.	Mississippi Representative from Clay County; 1924–1928; 1932–1936; 1956–1968; Served alongside: Edward H. Kennedy, C. S. Harris, William C. Loden	Succeeded by Charles C. Wilsford; Byron H. Loving; J. Wyndell Carty
