= Tibbee, Mississippi =

- Unincorporated community
- Location within Mississippi Location within the United States
- Coordinates: 33°31′42″N 88°37′53″W
- Country: United States
- State: Mississippi
- County: Clay
- Elevation: 203 ft (62 m)
- Time zone: UTC-6 (Central (CST))
  - Summer (DST): UTC-5 (CDT)
- ZIP code: 39773
- Area code: 662
- GNIS feature ID: 678743

Tibbee, also known as Tibbee Station, is an unincorporated community located in Clay County, Mississippi, United States. Tibbee is approximately 7 miles (11 km) east of Osborn and approximately 3 miles (4.8 km) north of Mayhew.

The community was named after Tibbee Creek.

Around November 1858, the Mobile and Ohio Railroad built a line through Tibbee. A post office with the name Tibby station was opened on December 9th, 1858. A station was presumably opened around the same time. The post office was renamed to Tibbee Station on March 12th, 1875.

Tibbee was once home to five stores and a school. The one-room schoolhouse, Tibbee School, was first built in 1861 and has since been restored. It is listed on the National Register of Historic Places.
