= Thorn, Mississippi =

- Unincorporated community
- Location within Mississippi Location within the United States
- Coordinates: 33°56′33″N 89°06′09″W
- Country: United States
- State: Mississippi
- County: Chickasaw
- Elevation: 328 ft (100 m)
- Time zone: UTC-6 (Central (CST))
  - Summer (DST): UTC-5 (CDT)
- Area code: 662
- GNIS feature ID: 678719

Thorn, also known as Flatwoods, is an unincorporated community in Chickasaw County, Mississippi, United States.

== History ==
Thorn is named for the first postmaster, William Thorn. A post office operated under the name Thorn from 1892 to 1971.

Thorn was once home to a school and general store.
