= Lee Gaines =

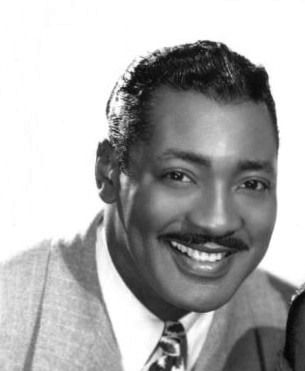

Background information
- Birth name: Otho Lee Gaines
- Born: April 21, 1914; Buena Vista, Mississippi, U.S.
- Died: July 15, 1987 (aged 73); Helsinki, Finland
- Occupation: Jazz musician

Otho Lee Gaines (April 21, 1914 – July 15, 1987) was an American jazz singer and lyricist. Gaines wrote the lyrics for "Take the "A" Train" and "Just A-Sittin' and A-Rockin'", two jazz standards by Billy Strayhorn.

Lee Gaines was from Buena Vista, Mississippi, and began singing as a bass in high school, he formed a vocal quartet at Langston University in 1933, and returned to the United States in 1937 having toured South America. Gaines was a founding member of the Delta Rhythm Boys who achieved their peak popularity in the 1940s and 50's, having recorded with Ella Fitzgerald, Count Basie, Jimmy Lunceford, Charlie Barnet, Fred Astaire, Ruth Brown and Les Paul.

The Delta Rhythm Boys moved to Europe in the 1950s. Gaines had lived in Finland for a year at the time of his death from cancer in 1987 and he is buried in Maunulan uurnalehto, an urn cemetery at Helsinki (section 39, lot 109). Gaines was married to Muriel Gaines, a calypso singer and former Cotton Club dancer.
