= Edward Hatch =

US Army general (1832–1889)

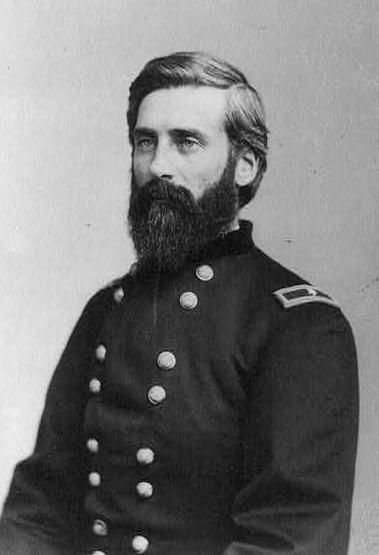
- Edward Hatch
- Born: December 22, 1832; Bangor, Maine, US
- Died: April 11, 1889 (aged 56); Fort Robinson, Nebraska, US
- Burial place: Fort Leavenworth National Cemetery, Kansas, US
- Military career
- Allegiance: United States of America; Union
- Branch: United States Army; Union Army
- Service years: 1861–1889
- Rank: Brevet Major General
- Commands: 2nd Iowa Cavalry; 9th U.S. Cavalry; Department of Arizona
- Conflicts: American Civil War; American Indian Wars

Edward Hatch (December 22, 1832 – April 11, 1889) was a career American soldier who served as a general in the Union Army during the American Civil War. After the war, he became the first commander of the 9th U.S. Cavalry Regiment, a buffalo soldier regiment with African-American troops commanded by White officers.

== Biography ==
Hatch, the son of Nathaniel and Elizabeth Scott Hatch, was born in Bangor, Maine, and educated at the Norwich Military Academy in Vermont.

As early as 1858, Hatch was a resident of Muscatine, Iowa, where he engaged in the lumber business.

Hatch volunteered for service as a private in the Union Army at the outbreak of the Civil War. He assisted in raising the 2nd Iowa Cavalry, becoming its major in August 1861. A few weeks later, he was commissioned its lieutenant colonel. In June 1862, on the promotion of Colonel Washington L. Elliott to brigadier general, he was made the regiment's colonel.

Hatch served under General Ulysses S. Grant in the South. After commanding the entire cavalry division in the Army of the Tennessee, he was appointed and confirmed a brigadier general in the spring of 1864. His gallantry in the field resulted in his further promotion to the rank of brevet major general later in 1864.

After the war, Hatch transferred from the volunteer to the Regular Army as colonel of the 9th U.S. Cavalry Regiment (1866). He succeeded General Gordon Granger as commander of the District of New Mexico (which included New Mexico Territory) in 1876, negotiated a treaty with the Ute Indians in 1880, and became widely known as an Indian fighter. The village of Hatch, New Mexico, was named in his honor.

Hatch died in Fort Robinson, Nebraska, on April 11, 1889, and is buried in Fort Leavenworth National Cemetery in Fort Leavenworth, Kansas.

== See also ==
- List of American Civil War generals (Union)
