= Billy Jefferson =

American football player (1918–1974)

William Jefferson
No. 46, 30, 43
- Position: Halfback

Personal information
- Born: March 17, 1918; Pheba, Mississippi, U.S.
- Died: March 10, 1974 (aged 55); Memphis, Tennessee, U.S.
- Listed height: 6 ft 2 in (1.88 m)
- Listed weight: 208 lb (94 kg)

Career information
- High school: Inverness (Inverness, Mississippi)
- College: Mississippi State
- NFL draft: 1941: 12th round, 105th overall pick

Career history

Playing
- Detroit Lions (1941); Brooklyn Dodgers (1942); Philadelphia Eagles (1942)

Coaching
- Utah (1950) Backfield coach; Northwest Mississippi (1952–1953) Head coach

Career NFL statistics
- Rushing yards: 222
- Rushing average: 3.3
- Receptions: 2
- Receiving yards: 14
- Total touchdowns: 2
- Stats at Pro Football Reference

William C. Jefferson (March 17, 1918 – March 10, 1974) was an American professional football player and coach. He played professionally as a halfback in the National Football League (NFL) with the Detroit Lions in 1941 and the Brooklyn Dodgers and the Philadelphia Eagles in 1942.
