= 1984 United States presidential election in Mississippi =

- November 6, 1984

Nominee	Ronald Reagan	Walter Mondale
Party	Republican	Democratic
Home state	California	Minnesota
Running mate	George H. W. Bush	Geraldine Ferraro
Electoral vote	7	0
Popular vote	581,477	352,192
Percentage	61.85%	37.46%

Reagan
40–50%
50–60%
60–70%
70–80%
Mondale
50–60%
60–70%
70–80%
President before election
Ronald Reagan
Republican
Elected President
Ronald Reagan
Republican

The 1984 United States presidential election in Mississippi took place on November 6, 1984. All fifty states and the District of Columbia, were part of the 1984 United States presidential election. Mississippi voters chose seven electors to the Electoral College, which selected the president and vice president of the United States.

Mississippi was won by incumbent United States President Ronald Reagan of California, who was running against former Vice President Walter Mondale of Minnesota. Reagan ran for a second time with former C.I.A. Director George H. W. Bush of Texas, and Mondale ran with Representative Geraldine Ferraro of New York, the first major female candidate for the vice presidency.

All but two counties gave either Mondale or Reagan an outright majority; Leflore and Issaquena Counties gave Reagan a plurality. Reagan's best county was Lamar, where he got 79.9% of the vote; Mondale's was Jefferson, where he got 77.9%. Despite Reagan's overall landslide win in the state, Jefferson County, which possessed the largest African-American share of United States county's population, gave Mondale his fourth-largest vote share of any county or county-equivalent, after the District of Columbia, Macon County, Alabama, and majority-Native American Shannon County, South Dakota.

As of the 2024 presidential election, this is the last election in which the following counties voted for a Republican presidential candidate: Clay, Jefferson Davis, Sunflower, and Tallahatchie. This marked the first time in history that Mississippi voted Republican in consecutive elections (or that a Republican carried the state twice), and the first such occasion for any party since 1956.

Among white voters, 79% supported Reagan while 20% supported Mondale.

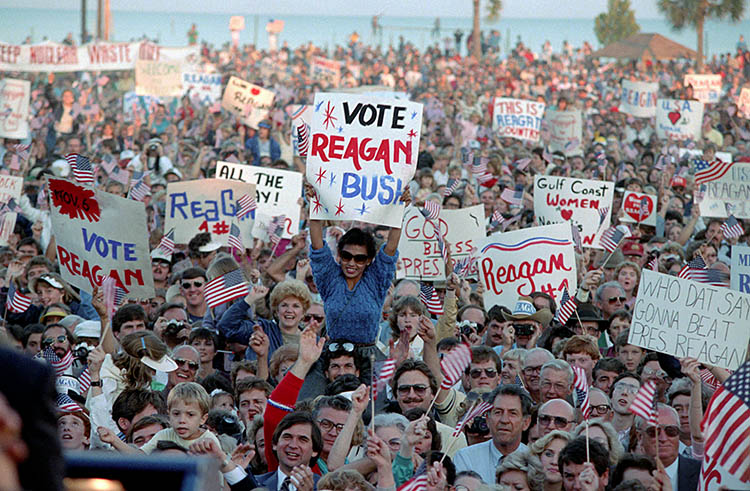
A Reagan-Bush Rally in Gulfport, Mississippi on October 1, 1984.

== Results ==
1984 United States presidential election in Mississippi
Party	Candidate	Votes	Percentage	Electoral votes
Republican	Ronald Reagan (incumbent)	581,477	61.85%	7
Democratic	Walter Mondale	352,192	37.46%	0
Libertarian	David Bergland	2,336	0.25%	0
Workers World	Larry Holmes	1,169	0.12%	0
Socialist Workers Party	Melvin Mason	1,032	0.11%	0
Independent	Lyndon LaRouche	1,001	0.11%	0
America First	Bob Richards	629	0.07%	0
New Alliance Party	Dennis Serrette	356	0.04%	0
Totals		940,192	100.0%	7

=== Results by county ===
County	Ronald Reagan Republican		Walter Mondale Democratic		Various candidates Other parties		Margin		Total votes cast
County	#	%	#	%	#	%	#	%	Total votes cast
Adams	9,440	54.32%	7,849	45.17%	89	0.51%	1,591	9.15%	17,378
Alcorn	7,203	58.66%	4,862	39.60%	214	1.74%	2,341	19.06%	12,279
Amite	3,463	57.24%	2,569	42.46%	18	0.30%	894	14.78%	6,050
Attala	4,870	59.28%	3,327	40.50%	18	0.22%	1,543	18.78%	8,215
Benton	1,737	50.12%	1,715	49.48%	14	0.40%	22	0.64%	3,466
Bolivar	6,939	43.85%	8,769	55.42%	116	0.73%	-1,830	-11.57%	15,824
Calhoun	3,579	67.06%	1,749	32.77%	9	0.17%	1,830	34.29%	5,337
Carroll	2,823	65.70%	1,462	34.02%	12	0.28%	1,361	31.68%	4,297
Chickasaw	3,605	60.52%	2,329	39.10%	23	0.39%	1,276	21.42%	5,957
Choctaw	2,491	68.00%	1,166	31.83%	6	0.16%	1,325	36.17%	3,663
Claiborne	1,294	28.86%	3,179	70.90%	11	0.25%	-1,885	-42.04%	4,484
Clarke	4,551	66.61%	2,262	33.11%	19	0.28%	2,289	33.50%	6,832
Clay	4,112	50.23%	4,046	49.42%	29	0.35%	66	0.81%	8,187
Coahoma	5,759	44.96%	6,839	53.39%	212	1.65%	-1,080	-8.43%	12,810
Copiah	5,806	55.74%	4,591	44.08%	19	0.18%	1,215	11.66%	10,416
Covington	4,165	64.95%	2,219	34.60%	29	0.45%	1,946	30.35%	6,413
DeSoto	12,576	73.88%	4,369	25.67%	77	0.45%	8,207	48.21%	17,022
Forrest	15,719	69.63%	6,786	30.06%	71	0.31%	8,933	39.57%	22,576
Franklin	2,564	62.86%	1,494	36.63%	21	0.51%	1,070	26.23%	4,079
George	4,346	72.10%	1,655	27.46%	27	0.45%	2,691	44.64%	6,028
Greene	2,744	67.55%	1,297	31.93%	21	0.52%	1,447	35.62%	4,062
Grenada	5,181	60.80%	3,325	39.02%	15	0.18%	1,856	21.78%	8,521
Hancock	7,662	74.07%	2,630	25.43%	52	0.50%	5,032	48.64%	10,344
Harrison	33,995	72.83%	12,495	26.77%	187	0.40%	21,500	46.06%	46,677
Hinds	56,953	56.69%	42,373	42.18%	1,142	1.14%	14,580	14.51%	100,468
Holmes	3,102	35.44%	5,641	64.45%	10	0.11%	-2,539	-29.01%	8,753
Humphreys	2,309	46.99%	2,596	52.83%	9	0.18%	-287	-5.84%	4,914
Issaquena	512	49.52%	501	48.45%	21	2.03%	11	1.07%	1,034
Itawamba	4,587	62.96%	2,674	36.71%	24	0.33%	1,913	26.25%	7,285
Jackson	29,585	76.79%	8,821	22.89%	123	0.32%	20,764	53.90%	38,529
Jasper	3,727	54.00%	3,104	44.97%	71	1.03%	623	9.03%	6,902
Jefferson	856	21.88%	3,049	77.94%	7	0.18%	-2,193	-56.06%	3,912
Jefferson Davis	2,884	51.81%	2,644	47.50%	38	0.68%	240	4.31%	5,566
Jones	17,586	70.47%	7,298	29.25%	70	0.28%	10,288	41.22%	24,954
Kemper	2,354	52.83%	2,089	46.88%	13	0.29%	265	5.95%	4,456
Lafayette	6,006	62.05%	3,646	37.67%	28	0.29%	2,360	24.38%	9,680
Lamar	7,929	79.85%	1,964	19.78%	37	0.37%	5,965	60.07%	9,930
Lauderdale	18,807	69.00%	7,534	27.64%	916	3.36%	11,273	41.36%	27,257
Lawrence	3,970	63.49%	2,274	36.37%	9	0.14%	1,696	27.12%	6,253
Leake	4,663	62.04%	2,845	37.85%	8	0.11%	1,818	24.19%	7,516
Lee	13,312	67.47%	6,208	31.46%	210	1.06%	7,104	36.01%	19,730
Leflore	7,550	49.63%	7,443	48.93%	219	1.44%	107	0.70%	15,212
Lincoln	8,898	66.50%	4,458	33.32%	25	0.19%	4,440	33.18%	13,381
Lowndes	12,049	66.29%	6,078	33.44%	50	0.28%	5,971	32.85%	18,177
Madison	9,298	53.24%	8,002	45.82%	163	0.93%	1,296	7.42%	17,463
Marion	7,355	66.11%	3,757	33.77%	13	0.12%	3,598	32.34%	11,125
Marshall	4,389	42.70%	5,845	56.87%	44	0.43%	-1,456	-14.17%	10,278
Monroe	7,387	62.28%	4,437	37.41%	36	0.30%	2,950	24.87%	11,860
Montgomery	3,093	62.07%	1,881	37.75%	9	0.18%	1,212	24.32%	4,983
Neshoba	6,715	71.71%	2,630	28.09%	19	0.20%	4,085	43.62%	9,364
Newton	5,911	73.23%	2,127	26.35%	34	0.42%	3,784	46.88%	8,072
Noxubee	2,123	41.23%	2,928	56.87%	98	1.90%	-805	-15.64%	5,149
Oktibbeha	7,574	59.65%	5,097	40.14%	26	0.20%	2,477	19.51%	12,697
Panola	5,850	51.43%	5,465	48.04%	60	0.53%	385	3.39%	11,375
Pearl River	9,978	76.10%	3,085	23.53%	49	0.37%	6,893	52.57%	13,112
Perry	3,098	65.30%	1,415	29.83%	231	4.87%	1,683	35.47%	4,744
Pike	8,254	57.28%	6,137	42.59%	20	0.14%	2,117	14.69%	14,411
Pontotoc	5,182	67.80%	2,434	31.85%	27	0.35%	2,748	35.95%	7,643
Prentiss	4,821	62.35%	2,897	37.47%	14	0.18%	1,924	24.88%	7,732
Quitman	2,198	48.33%	2,343	51.52%	7	0.15%	-145	-3.19%	4,548
Rankin	22,393	79.10%	5,874	20.75%	41	0.14%	16,519	58.35%	28,308
Scott	5,763	63.66%	3,274	36.16%	16	0.18%	2,489	27.50%	9,053
Sharkey	1,487	43.76%	1,723	50.71%	188	5.53%	-236	-6.95%	3,398
Simpson	5,983	67.04%	2,894	32.43%	47	0.53%	3,089	34.61%	8,924
Smith	5,116	76.24%	1,573	23.44%	21	0.31%	3,543	52.80%	6,710
Stone	2,980	71.07%	1,185	28.26%	28	0.67%	1,795	42.81%	4,193
Sunflower	5,178	51.21%	4,913	48.59%	20	0.20%	265	2.62%	10,111
Tallahatchie	2,901	51.38%	2,725	48.26%	20	0.35%	176	3.12%	5,646
Tate	4,677	61.89%	2,846	37.66%	34	0.45%	1,831	24.23%	7,557
Tippah	4,706	64.46%	2,566	35.15%	29	0.40%	2,140	29.31%	7,301
Tishomingo	3,527	54.87%	2,879	44.79%	22	0.34%	648	10.08%	6,428
Tunica	1,109	39.55%	1,621	57.81%	74	2.64%	-512	-18.26%	2,804
Union	5,837	67.74%	2,766	32.10%	14	0.16%	3,071	35.64%	8,617
Walthall	3,305	59.65%	2,219	40.05%	17	0.31%	1,086	19.60%	5,541
Warren	12,959	60.99%	8,054	37.90%	235	1.11%	4,905	23.09%	21,248
Washington	12,454	53.19%	10,617	45.34%	343	1.46%	1,837	7.85%	23,414
Wayne	5,000	63.81%	2,818	35.96%	18	0.23%	2,182	27.85%	7,836
Webster	3,390	70.71%	1,397	29.14%	7	0.15%	1,993	41.57%	4,794
Wilkinson	1,722	39.28%	2,627	59.92%	35	0.80%	-905	-20.64%	4,384
Winston	5,192	59.36%	3,543	40.51%	11	0.13%	1,649	18.85%	8,746
Yalobusha	2,934	55.52%	2,337	44.22%	14	0.26%	597	11.30%	5,285
Yazoo	6,275	54.99%	5,037	44.14%	100	0.88%	1,238	10.85%	11,412
Totals	581,477	61.85%	352,192	37.46%	6,523	0.69%	229,285	24.39%	940,192

==== Counties that flipped from Democratic to Republican ====
- Alcorn
- Amite
- Attala
- Benton
- Calhoun
- Chickasaw
- Clarke (was tied)
- Clay
- Copiah
- Franklin
- Grenada
- Issaquena
- Itawamba
- Jasper
- Jefferson Davis
- Kemper
- Lafayette
- Leake
- Lee
- Leflore
- Madison
- Marion
- Monroe
- Montgomery
- Panola
- Pike
- Pontotoc
- Prentiss
- Sunflower
- Tallahatchie
- Tate
- Tippah
- Tishomingo
- Union
- Walthall
- Washington
- Yalobusha
- Winston
- Yazoo

=== Results by congressional district ===
Reagan won all five congressional districts, including three held by Democrats.

District	Reagan	Mondale	Representative
1st	62.6%	37.4%	Jamie Whitten
2nd	50.5%	49.5%	Webb Franklin
3rd	65.4%	34.6%	Sonny Montgomery
4th	59.0%	41.0%	Wayne Dowdy
5th	73.7%	26.3%	Trent Lott

== See also ==
- Presidency of Ronald Reagan
- United States presidential elections in Mississippi

== Works cited ==
- Black, Earl; Black, Merle (1992). The Vital South: How Presidents Are Elected. Harvard University Press. ISBN 0674941306.
