= Tibi =

Tibi can refer to:

== Given name ==
- A nickname for Tibor
- A nickname for Tiberiu
  - Tiberiu Csik, "Tibi", Romanian professional footballer
  - Tiberiu Curt, "Tibi", Romanian professional footballer
  - Tiberiu Lung, "Tibi", Romanian professional footballer and coach
  - Tiberiu Dolniceanu, "Tibi", Romanian fencer
- Isabel J. Tibbie "Tibi" Hardie or Isabel Hardie
- Tibi Cohen, Israeli footballer
- Tibi (footballer) (1951–2021), Portuguese footballer
- Fictional character in Tibi and His Mothers

== Surname ==
- Ahmad Tibi (born 1958), Israeli Arab politician
- Athena Tibi
- Bassam Tibi (born 1944), Syrian–German professor of political science
- Eitan Tibi (born 1987), Israeli footballer
- Shahar Tibi
- Zeina el Tibi

== Places ==
- Tibi, Alicante, a municipality in Spain
- Tibi, Spain
- Tibi Dam, Spain

== Other ==
- Tibi (fashion brand), an American fashion company
- Tibicos or Tibi, symbiotic culture used for fermentation

== See also ==
- Tiby
- Tibbi
