= 2nd Iowa Cavalry Regiment =

- Iowa state flag
- Active: August 30, 1861, to September 19, 1865
- Country: United States
- Allegiance: Union
- Branch: Cavalry
- Engagements: Siege of Corinth; Battle of Corinth; Battle of Booneville; Grierson's Raid; Battle of Franklin; Battle of Nashville

The 2nd Iowa Cavalry Regiment was a cavalry regiment that served in the Union Army during the American Civil War.

== Service ==
The 2nd Iowa Cavalry was recruited in the following counties and organized at Davenport, Iowa they mustered in at Camp Joe Holt for three years of Federal service between August 30 and September 28, 1861.

- Company A - Muscatine County
- Company B - Marshall County
- Company C - Scott County
- Company D - Polk County
- Company E - Scott County
- Company F - Hamilton County and Franklin County with Scott County
- Company G - Muscatine County with Scott County
- Company H - Johnson County with some Scott County
- Company I - Cerro Gordo, Delaware and other counties with Scott County
- Company K - Des Moines County with Scott County
- Company L - Jackson County with Scott County
- Company M - Jackson County with Scott County

The men numbered 1,050 and Captain Washington L. Elliott was appointed colonel. On the 7th of December the Second Cavalry left Davenport for Benton Barracks near Saint Louis. While here the men were crowded into closed quarters where a great amount of sickness prevailed resulting in sixty deaths.

Among other engagements, the Regiment took part in Grierson's Raid through Mississippi in April 1863, being detached from the main column (6th and 7th Illinois Cavalry) after a few days to decoy the Confederate pursuit. They engaged the 2nd/22nd Tennessee Cavalry (Barteau's) at Palo Alto, Mississippi on April 21 and 22, 1863 and reported six missing after the skirmish. The regiment was mustered out of Federal service on September 19, 1865, in Selma, Alabama.

== Total strength and casualties ==
A total of 2053 men served in the 2nd Iowa at one time or another during its existence. It suffered a total of 269 (275?) fatalities: 1 officer and 59 enlisted men who were killed in action or who died of their wounds; 8 officers and 207 enlisted men who died of disease.

== Commanders ==
- Colonel Washington L. Elliott
- Colonel Edward Hatch
- Colonel Datus E. Coon

== See also ==
- List of Iowa Civil War Units
- Iowa in the American Civil War
