= Pyland, Mississippi =

- Unincorporated community
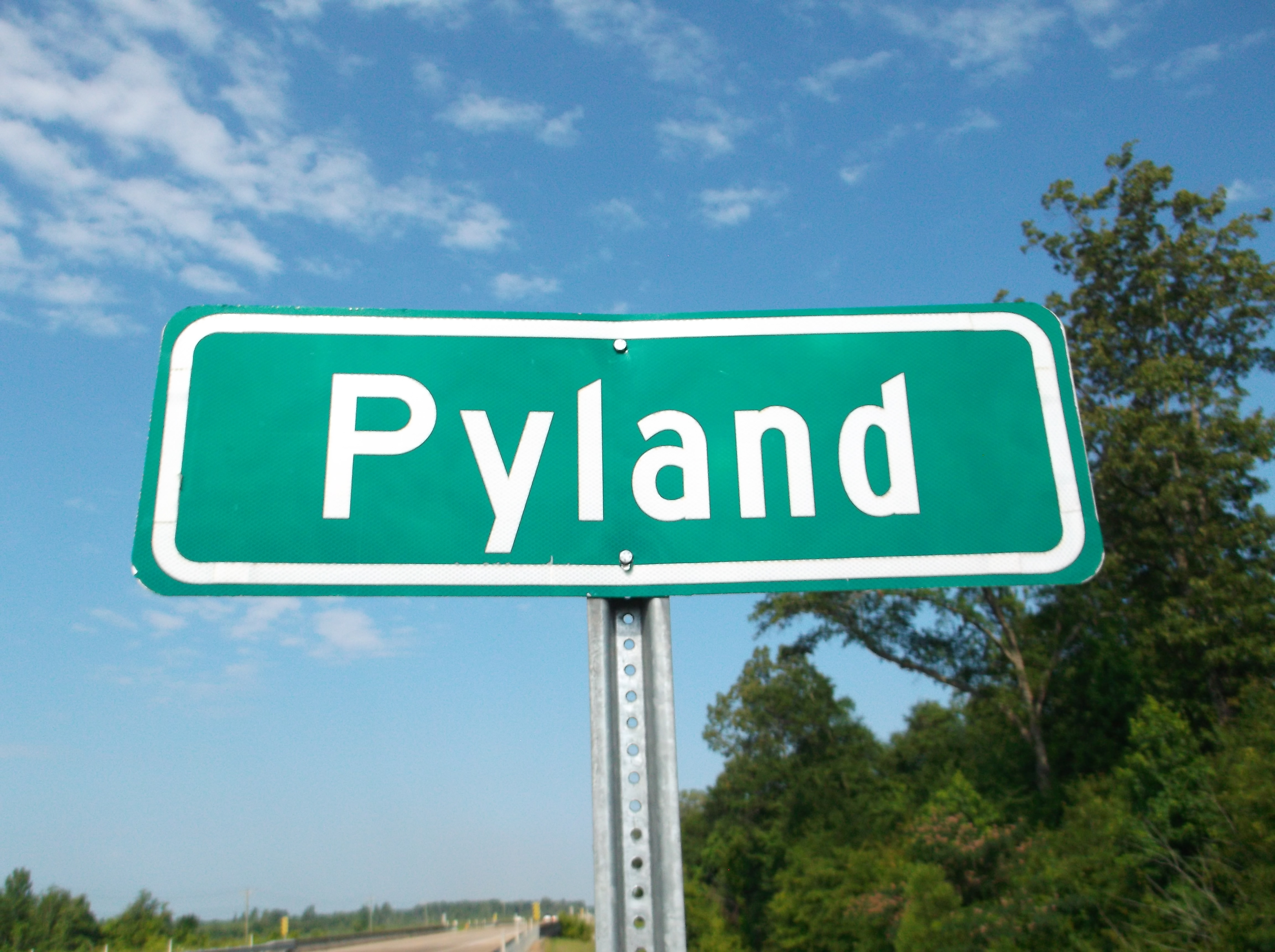

- Location within Mississippi Location within the United States
- Coordinates: 33°53′02″N 89°06′27″W
- Country: United States
- State: Mississippi
- County: Chickasaw
- Elevation: 289 ft (88 m)
- Time zone: UTC-6 (Central (CST))
  - Summer (DST): UTC-5 (CDT)
- ZIP code: 38851
- Area code: 662
- GNIS feature ID: 676428

Pyland is an unincorporated community located in Chickasaw County, Mississippi, United States. Pyland is approximately 6 miles (9.7 km) west of Houston and 4 miles (6.4 km) east of Vardaman.

A post office operated under the name Pyland from 1907 to 1942.
