= Datus Ensign Coon =

American Union Army colonel and Alabama politician (1831–1893)

Datus Ensign Coon (1831–1893) was an American newspaper publisher, Union Army officer during the American Civil War, planter, and state politician in Alabama. He was a delegate to the 1875 Alabama Constitutional Convention and a fraternal order of veterans president in San Diego, California. He served as a state legislator during the Reconstruction era in Alabama. representing Dallas County, Alabama in the Alabama House of Representatives. He served on investigating committee evaluating corruption allegations against U.S. Senator George E. Spencer.

Coon was the son of Luke Coon Jr. and Lois Locina Burdick, born in De Ruyter, New York to a religious family with roots in Rhode Island and Massachusetts. He was named for Datus Ensign (1783-1853), a famous evangelist of the time. He worked on a farm in Iowa with his father before starting a newspaper. During the American Civil War he served as Colonel of the 2nd Iowa Cavalry Regiment and eventually commanded a cavalry brigade.

In 1872 he was documented as an inspector in the 2nd District of Alabama. A specimen of gypsiferous marl from him in Selma, Alabama was documented in an agricultural report in 1872.

Coon served as U.S. Commercial Agent in Baracoa, Cuba.

Coon moved to San Diego in 1878 to serve as a "Chinese Inspector" (Chinese Exclusion Act). He was a leading member of the Grand Army of the Republic (G.A.R.) in San Diego and was accidentally shot in 1893. The organization named one of its posts for him.

Coon is buried at Mt. Hope Cemetery in San Diego.
