= J. Wesley Caradine =

American farmer and state legislator

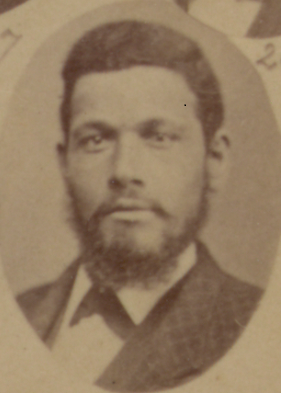

Member of the Mississippi House of Representatives
- In office 1874–1875

Personal details
- Born: February 16, 1846 Mississippi
- Party: Republican
- Spouse: Celia Sanders
- Profession: Politician, farmer
- Known for: Being the first state representative for Clay County, Mississippi

John Wesley Caradine (February 16, 1846 – ) was an American farmer and state legislator from Mississippi. He served in the Mississippi House of Representatives in 1874 and 1875. He was the first state representative for Clay County, Mississippi after it was established in 1871.

A Republican, he testified about threats and intimidation from Democrats during the 1875 election.

Celia Sanders was his wife.

== See also ==
- African American officeholders from the end of the Civil War until before 1900
