= Van Vleet, Mississippi =

- Census-designated place
- Location within Mississippi Location within the United States
- Coordinates: 33°59′13″N 88°54′01″W
- Country: United States
- State: Mississippi
- County: Chickasaw

Area
  - Total: 0.77 sq mi (2.00 km^{2})
  - Land: 0.77 sq mi (2.00 km^{2})
  - Water: 0 sq mi (0.00 km^{2})
- Elevation: 377 ft (115 m)

Population (2020)
  - Total: 95
  - Density: 123.2/sq mi (47.57/km^{2})
- Time zone: UTC-6 (Central (CST))
  - Summer (DST): UTC-5 (CDT)
- ZIP code: 38877
- Area code: 662
- GNIS feature ID: 695068

Van Vleet is a census-designated place and unincorporated community in Chickasaw County, Mississippi, United States. Van Vleet is located at the junction of Mississippi Highway 32 and Mississippi Highway 385, 8 miles (13 km) northeast of Houston. Van Vleet has a post office with ZIP code 38877.

Van Vleet is located on the former Houston Branch of the Southern Railway.

A post office first began operation under the name Van Vleet in 1891.

As of the 2020 Census, the population was 95.

== Demographics ==
Historical population
Census	Pop.	Note	%±
2020	95		—
U.S. Decennial Census; 2020

Van Vleet was first listed as a census designated place in the 2020 U.S. census.

=== 2020 census ===
Van Vleet CDP, Mississippi – Racial and ethnic composition Note: the US Census treats Hispanic/Latino as an ethnic category. This table excludes Latinos from the racial categories and assigns them to a separate category. Hispanics/Latinos may be of any race.
Race / Ethnicity (NH = Non-Hispanic)	Pop 2020	% 2020
White alone (NH)	67	70.53%
Black or African American alone (NH)	9	9.47%
Native American or Alaska Native alone (NH)	4	4.21%
Asian alone (NH)	4	4.21%
Pacific Islander alone (NH)	0	0.00%
Some Other Race alone (NH)	0	0.00%
Mixed Race or Multi-Racial (NH)	4	4.21%
Hispanic or Latino (any race)	7	7.37%
Total	95	100.00%
