= Palo Alto, Mississippi =

- Town of Palo Alto
- U.S. National Register of Historic Places
- Location within Mississippi Location within the United States
- Location: Clay County, Mississippi northwest of West Point
- Coordinates: 33°40′50″N 88°48′0″W
- Area: 196.4 acres (79.5 ha)
- Built: 1846
- NRHP reference No.: 87000473
- Added to NRHP: August 20, 1987

Palo Alto (also Savannah) is a ghost town in Clay County, Mississippi, United States. Established c. 1846, it has an elevation of 279 feet (85 m).

== History ==
Palo Alto was named in honor of the Battle of Palo Alto. The Palo Alto Academy was once located in Palo Alto. A carriage factory, general store, and the Palo Alto Inn were formerly in operation in Palo Alto. The community was prosperous prior to the Civil War, but was absorbed into the nearby community of Abbott after the Civil War.

A post office operated under the name Palo Alto from 1846 to 1898.

Company F of the 44th Mississippi Infantry was known as The Palo Alto Confederates and was mustered into service on July 27, 1861 in Palo Alto. Soldiers from this company served with the Army of Tennessee in many battles, including Shiloh, Munfordville, Murfreesboro, and Chickamauga.

During the Civil War, a skirmish was fought in Palo Alto on April 21 and 22, 1863 between the 2nd/22nd Tennessee Cavalry (Barteau's) and the 2nd Iowa Volunteer Cavalry Regiment. The Iowa soldiers, under the command of Edward Hatch, were part of Grierson's Raid and were being used to distract Confederate soldiers from Grierson's main column. After the skirmish Hatch's soldiers marched to Okolona, burning down barracks, a cotton warehouse, and ammunition stores. Six Union Army soldiers were declared missing after the skirmish.

In 1876, Palo Alto was the site of an incident in which a group of heavily armed white men brought a piece of field artillery and broke up a meeting of the Republican Club in order to suppress black voters.

In 1987, the townsite was listed on the National Register of Historic Places under the name of "Town of Palo Alto." Nearly 200 acres (81 ha) were listed on the Register as part of the community.
