= Tibbee School =

Historic property in Mississippi, US

- U.S. National Register of Historic Places
- Location: Tibbee-Columbus Rd., at Tibbee, Tibbee, Mississippi in Clay County, Mississippi
- Coordinates: 33°31′33″N 88°37′43″W
- NRHP reference No.: 91001642

Tibbee School is a historic property in Tibbee, Mississippi in Clay County, Mississippi. It includes a one-room schoolhouse. The school closed in 1933 and the school building had been used for turkeys before being restored. It is listed on the National Register of Historic Places.

The school was built in 1861 in what was then Lowndes County, Mississippi. The school is on Tibbee Road. The community of Tibbee had a post office and stores supplying travelers between West Point, Mississippi and Columbus, Mississippi.

== See also ==
- National Register of Historic Places listings in Clay County, Mississippi
