= Trebloc, Mississippi =

- Unincorporated community
- Location within Mississippi Location within the United States
- Coordinates: 33°50′28″N 88°49′49″W
- Country: United States
- State: Mississippi
- County: Chickasaw
- Elevation: 318 ft (97 m)
- Time zone: UTC-6 (Central (CST))
  - Summer (DST): UTC-5 (CDT)
- ZIP code: 38875
- GNIS feature ID: 678866

Trebloc is an unincorporated community in Chickasaw County, Mississippi, United States. It is located at the intersections of Highways 8 and 47, 10.5 mi (16.9 km) southeast of Houston, Mississippi.

== History ==
Trebloc is named after a historic Chickasaw-Scots family located in the area named "Colbert", who used letters in their name to create the town name "Trebloc" (an ananym).

A small United States post office is located at Trebloc, as is the historic house of a doctor. Trebloc post office was established June 23, 1894, with Joseph M. Colbert as first postmaster.

== See also ==
- List of geographic names derived from anagrams and ananyms
