= McCondy, Mississippi =

- Unincorporated community
- Location within Mississippi Location within the United States
- Coordinates: 33°49′20″N 88°50′33″W
- Country: United States
- State: Mississippi
- County: Chickasaw
- Elevation: 292 ft (89 m)
- Time zone: UTC-6 (Central (CST))
  - Summer (DST): UTC-5 (CDT)
- Area code: 662
- GNIS feature ID: 673310

McCondy is an unincorporated community in Chickasaw County, Mississippi.

== History ==
McCondy was one of the first areas settled in Chickasaw County and was named for the first postmaster, Andrew McCondy. McCondy moved to the area from Scotland.

A post office first began operation under the name McCondy in 1880.

McCondy was home to a school from 1872 to 1949.
