= Sparta, Mississippi =

- Unincorporated community
- Location within Mississippi Location within the United States
- Coordinates: 33°46′07″N 88°58′45″W
- Country: United States
- State: Mississippi
- County: Chickasaw
- Elevation: 335 ft (102 m)
- Time zone: UTC-6 (Central (CST))
  - Summer (DST): UTC-5 (CDT)
- Area code: 662
- GNIS feature ID: 678038

Sparta is an unincorporated community in Chickasaw County, Mississippi, United States.

== History ==
Sparta was once home to two churches and a school. A post office operated under the name Sparta from 1850 to 1905.

Company H of the 13th Mississippi Infantry (known as "The Spartan Band") was enlisted at Sparta on March 23, 1861. Soldiers from this company served with the Army of Northern Virginia in many battles, including First Manassas, Fredericksburg, Chancellorsville, Gettysburg, Chickamauga, and the Appomattox campaign.

== Popular culture ==
The 1967 film In the Heat of the Night was set in Sparta, but was actually filmed in and around Sparta, Illinois. The television series was also set in Sparta, but the fictional Sparta was larger and located somewhere along Interstate 20.
