= Washington Lafayette Elliott =

American general

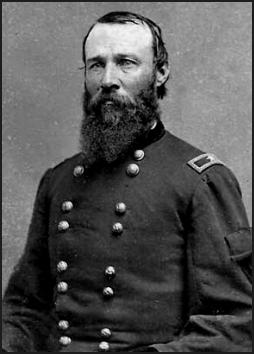
- Washington Lafayette Elliott
- Born: March 31, 1825; Carlisle, Pennsylvania
- Died: June 29, 1888 (aged 63); San Francisco, California
- Burial place: The Presidio of San Francisco
- Military career
- Allegiance: United States of America; Union
- Branch: United States Army; Union Army
- Service years: 1846–1879
- Rank: Brigadier general Brevet major general
- Commands: 2nd Iowa Volunteer Cavalry; 3rd Cavalry Regiment
- Conflicts: Mexican–American War; American Civil War

Washington Lafayette Elliott (March 31, 1825 – June 29, 1888) was a brigadier general in the Union Army during the American Civil War. He led a division of IV Corps at the Battle of Nashville in 1864. In 1866, he was awarded the honorary grade of brevet major general, U.S. Army.

== Early life and career ==
Elliott was born on March 31, 1825, at Carlisle, Pennsylvania, in the United States. He was the son of U.S. Navy Commodore Jesse Elliott. Washington accompanied his father on some voyages. After attending Dickinson College, he entered the United States Military Academy on July 1, 1841. He left in 1844 to study medicine, but was commissioned a second lieutenant in 1846 for the Mexican–American War. He fell ill during the Siege of Veracruz and spent the rest of the war on recruiting duty. He remained in the army as a first lieutenant (1847), serving as a quartermaster. Elliott was promoted to the rank of captain in 1854.

In 1858, Elliott married Valeria Biddle Blaney (1828–1900), a collector of scientific natural history specimens who was a first cousin of Spencer Fullerton Baird of the Smithsonian Institution. Baird and Girard named a species of snake after her, Virginia valeriae, after she collected the type specimen of the species.

== Civil War service ==
After the outbreak of the American Civil War, Elliott served in Missouri, fighting at the Battle of Wilson's Creek. He was promoted to major of the 3rd U.S. Cavalry on August 3, 1861. Commissioned colonel of the 2nd Iowa Cavalry on September 14, 1861, Elliott served under Maj. Gen. John Pope in the Battle of Island Number Ten. He led a brigade in the Siege of Corinth. Elliott became a brigadier general on June 11, 1862, after leading a raid on the Mobile and Ohio Railroad. Elliott served on Maj. Gen. John Pope's staff in the Army of the Mississippi.

Elliott transferred east with Pope and served as chief of cavalry in the Army of Virginia. He was wounded at the Second Battle of Bull Run on August 30, 1862. He served for a time in the Department of the Northwest, as commander of the District of Wisconsin and commander of the department, before returning east in 1863. During the first half of 1863, Elliott was a brigade commander in the Middle Department, and led a brigade during the Second Battle of Winchester in mid-June. Then, Elliott took command of a new division that joined III Corps, Army of the Potomac, as its third division shortly after the Battle of Gettysburg.

Elliott went west again and led the first division of the cavalry corps of the Army of the Cumberland during the relief of the Siege of Knoxville. He served as commander of that army's cavalry corps in the Atlanta campaign. He was transferred to the infantry in late 1864, leading a division of IV Corps at the Battle of Nashville. Elliott then commanded the District of Kansas in the Department of the Missouri before being mustered out of the volunteer service on March 1, 1866. On June 17, 1866, President Andrew Johnson nominated Elliott for the award of the honorary grade of brevet major general, U.S.A., to rank from March 13, 1865, and the U. S. Senate confirmed the award on July 23, 1866.

== Postbellum ==
Elliott in later life

After the war, Washington Elliott remained in the Regular Army (United States) as a major in the 1st Cavalry. He was promoted to the rank of lieutenant colonel, and in 1878, became colonel of the 3rd Cavalry. Elliott retired in 1879 and became a banker in San Francisco, California. He died in that city in 1888 and was buried at the Presidio of San Francisco.

== See also ==
- List of American Civil War generals (Union)
