= Tiberiu =

Tiberiu is a Romanian-language masculine given name that may refer to:

- Tiberiu Bălan
- Tiberiu Bărbulețiu
- Tiberiu Bone
- Tiberiu Brediceanu
- Tiberiu Brînză
- Tiberiu Dolniceanu
- Tiberiu Ghioane
- Tiberiu Iliescu
- Tiberiu Mikloș
- Tiberiu Negrean
- Tiberiu Olah
- Tiberiu Popoviciu
- Tiberiu Serediuc
