= Shake Rag, Mississippi =

- Unincorporated community
- Location within Mississippi Location within the United States
- Coordinates: 34°00′7″N 88°49′30″W
- Country: United States
- State: Mississippi
- County: Chickasaw
- Elevation: 341 ft (104 m)
- Time zone: UTC-6 (Central (CST))
  - Summer (DST): UTC-5 (CDT)
- ZIP code: 38860, 38877
- GNIS feature ID: 710375

Shake Rag was an unincorporated community in Chickasaw County, Mississippi.
