= Tibby =

Tibby is a diminutive given name and a surname. Notable people with the name include:

== Given name ==
- Tibby Clarke or T. E. B. Clarke (1907–1989), English film screenwriter
- Tibby Cotter or Albert "Tibby" Cotter (1883–1917), Australian cricketer
- Tibby Russell or Elizabeth S. Russell (1913–2001), American biologist
- Tibby Vigh or Tibor Vigh (born 1941), Hungarian-born Canadian soccer player

== Surname ==
- Zuri Tibby (born 1995), American model

== See also ==
- Tibby Creek (Noxubee River tributary), a stream in Mississippi
- Tibby Creek (Yockanookany River tributary), a stream in Mississippi
