= Abbott, Mississippi =

- Unincorporated community
- Location within Mississippi Location within the United States
- Coordinates: 33°40′48″N 88°46′28″W
- Country: United States
- State: Mississippi
- County: Clay
- Elevation: 253 ft (77 m)
- Time zone: UTC-6 (Central (CST))
  - Summer (DST): UTC-5 (CDT)
- Area code: 662
- GNIS feature ID: 666126

Abbott is an unincorporated community located in Clay County, Mississippi, United States.

== History ==
Abbott was named for Captain F. M. Abbott, who moved to the area from Pennsylvania after the Civil War. Captain Abbott built a store building here in 1901.

Abbott is located on Chuquatonchee Creek and was once home to a grist mill and cotton gin. In addition, it also had a saddle shop, blacksmith shop, and three general stores. A post office operated under the name Abbott from 1880 to 1941.

Emmett H. Walker, Jr., who served as the Chief of the National Guard Bureau from 1982 to 1986, was born in Abbott.
