= Tibby Creek (Noxubee River tributary) =

Stream in Mississippi, United States

Coordinates: 33.0437382°N 88.4836511°W

Tibby Creek is a stream in the U.S. state of Mississippi. It is a tributary to the Noxubee River.

Tibby is a name derived from the Choctaw language purported to mean either (sources vary) "icy creek" or "to fight".
