= Buena Vista, Mississippi =

- Unincorporated community
- Location within Mississippi Location within the United States
- Coordinates: 33°53′04″N 88°50′17″W
- Country: United States
- State: Mississippi
- County: Chickasaw
- Elevation: 344 ft (105 m)
- Time zone: UTC-6 (Central (CST))
  - Summer (DST): UTC-5 (CDT)
- Area code: 662
- GNIS feature ID: 692754

Buena Vista, also known as Monterey, is an unincorporated community in Chickasaw County, Mississippi, United States.

== History ==
Buena Vista was incorporated in 1884 and unincorporated at a later date. The community was originally named Monterey in honor of the Battle of Monterrey, where the Mississippi Rifles served under Colonel Jefferson Davis. Later that year, the name was changed to Buena Vista in honor of the Battle of Buena Vista, where the Mississippi troops and Davis again served.

A post office only operated under the name Monterey in 1847 and operated under the name Buena Vista from 1847 to 1972.

Buena Vista was once home to multiple stores and two churches.

The Buena Vista Normal College opened in Buena Vista in 1885 and was chartered by the state of Mississippi the following year.

The first agricultural high school in Mississippi opened in Buena Vista in 1908. Cully Cobb, a pioneer of southern agriculture, long-term farm publisher, and an official of the Agricultural Adjustment Administration in Washington, D.C., was the superintendent of the school from 1908–1910.

Company A of the 17th Mississippi Infantry was known as the Buena Vista Rifles and was organized in Buena Vista on March 28, 1861. Soldiers from this company served with the Army of Northern Virginia in many battles, including First Manassas, Fredericksburg, Chancellorsville, Gettysburg, Chickamauga, and the Appomattox campaign. Company A specifically served under William Barksdale at the Battle of Gettysburg and were part of Barksdale's charge on the Peach Orchard.

== Notable person ==
- Lee Gaines, jazz singer and lyricist
