= Montpelier, Mississippi =

- Unincorporated community
- Location within Mississippi Location within the United States
- Coordinates: 33°43′04″N 88°56′52″W
- Country: United States
- State: Mississippi
- County: Clay
- Elevation: 289 ft (88 m)
- Time zone: UTC-6 (Central (CST))
  - Summer (DST): UTC-5 (CDT)
- ZIP code: 39754
- Area code: 662
- GNIS feature ID: 673749

Montpelier (also Crosstown, LaCross) is an unincorporated community in Clay County, Mississippi, United States. It is located along Mississippi Highway 46 in the northwestern part of the county. The community contains West Clay Elementary School.

A post office first began operation under the name Montpelier in 1853.

Montpelier's Historic District is listed on the National Register of Historic Places.
