= Golden Triangle (Mississippi) =

Region in east-central Mississippi, United States

Coordinates: 33.542190°N 88.660831°W

The Golden Triangle (GTR) is a region in the east central portion of the U.S. state of Mississippi. The "triangle" is formed by the cities of Columbus, Starkville, and West Point but the region is often more broadly defined to include all of Clay, Lowndes, and Oktibbeha counties and sometimes additional surrounding communities and counties as well. The term was used as a marketing strategy in the 1960s to promote economic development in the region and encourage additional cooperation between local communities in attracting investment, although the term was in use by 1939.

The three counties are home to a population of over 128,000 and 500,000 workers are within 60 miles of the region. The area's economic development potential is anchored by the presence of Mississippi State University, Columbus Air Force Base, and associated spin-off industries in research, high-tech manufacturing, aerospace, transportation, and education. GTR has attracted $5.9 billion in capital investment since 2008.

The area is served by Golden Triangle Regional Airport, which is the third busiest in the state.

== History ==
This area has been considered part of Mississippi's Black Belt, also called "Black Prairie", which extends throughout Mississippi and Alabama. Its economy was largely based on cotton production well into the 20th century. Due to planters' reliance on cotton as a commodity crop, and dependence on enslaved African-American workers before the American Civil War, African Americans constituted a majority of the population of these counties in Mississippi and Alabama before the war and after. Many stayed as freedmen to work as sharecroppers and tenant farmers.

Historically, Columbus was the largest city in the region and considered the anchor of the Golden Triangle. Columbus was able to succeed due to its historical importance as a port on the Tombigbee River, which made the city attractive to industry. The presence of Columbus Air Force Base (established 1941) and the Mississippi University for Women (founded in 1884 amd made coeducational in 1982) added to the economy of the city.

However, industrial decline in many of the city's industries began to take hold during the 1990s. Meanwhile, rapid growth at Mississippi State University, the state's largest research university, has added to Starkville's stability and appeal. In 2012, Starkville surpassed Columbus in population to become the largest city in the region.

The third city, West Point, Mississippi, has always been the smallest and more vulnerable economically. It suffered the closing of a Sara Lee meat-processing plant in 2007 that cost 1000 jobs, equivalent to "a tenth of the town's population."

The local jurisdictions and counties joined together in 2012 to support an economic development authority to recruit industry to the area. It was first called Golden Triangle Development LINK; in 2014 it became known as Golden Triangle Development Authority (GTDA). The consortium was based on an "annual operating budget of $2.5 million, 70 percent of which will come from public entities in the three counties that make up the Golden Triangle. The organization hopes to privately fund the remaining 30 percent via five-year agreements with area businesses."

Such recruiting has been successful. Since the early 21st century, several manufacturing companies have located at the Golden Triangle Industrial Park in Lowndes County, leading to a resurgence in the Columbus area. The Triangle is home to an advanced-tech steel mill developed by the Russian Severstal company, a drone plant, and a helicopter factory (Eurocopter, now known as Airbus Helicopters). Area residents say the latter helps them establish the region as one that can support highly skilled, high-tech jobs. In addition, Yokohama Tires of Japan opened a manufacturing plant in the area in 2015.

From 2004–2014, the Golden Triangle region "brought in some $6 billion in capital investment ..., creating some 6,000 new jobs, in a concentrated, poor region where this influx has made an enormous difference."

== See also ==
- Megasite
