= Waverly, Mississippi =

- Unincorporated community
- Location within Mississippi Location within the United States
- Coordinates: 33°34′03″N 88°30′14″W
- Country: United States
- State: Mississippi
- County: Clay
- Elevation: 184 ft (56 m)
- Time zone: UTC-6 (Central (CST))
  - Summer (DST): UTC-5 (CDT)
- Area code: 662
- GNIS feature ID: 679395

Waverly (also Mullens Bluff, Waverley, Waverley Plantation) is an unincorporated community in Clay County, Mississippi, United States.

Waverly is located on the former Southern Railway. Waverly was once home to a church, saw mill, and grist mill. A ferry once operated in Waverly that was used to cross the Tombigbee River.

A post office operated under the name Waverly from 1879 to 1906.

== Notable person ==
- John Pitchlynn, interpreter at the Choctaw Agency
