= Pheba, Mississippi =

- Census-designated place
- Location within Mississippi Location within the United States
- Coordinates: 33°35′03″N 88°56′59″W
- Country: United States
- State: Mississippi
- County: Clay

Area
  - Total: 2.09 sq mi (5.41 km^{2})
  - Land: 2.09 sq mi (5.41 km^{2})
  - Water: 0 sq mi (0.00 km^{2})
- Elevation: 266 ft (81 m)

Population (2020)
  - Total: 160
  - Density: 76.6/sq mi (29.58/km^{2})
- Time zone: UTC-6 (Central (CST))
  - Summer (DST): UTC-5 (CDT)
- ZIP code: 39755
- Area code: 662
- GNIS feature ID: 675673

Pheba (FEE-bee) is a census-designated place and unincorporated community located in Clay County, Mississippi, United States. Pheba is located at the intersection of Mississippi Highway 50 and Mississippi Highway 389 and is approximately 7 miles (11 km) west of Cedarbluff.

As of the 2020 census, Pheba had a population of 160.

Although an unincorporated community, Pheba has a post office and a zip code of 39755.

== History ==
Pheba was named for Mrs. Pheba Robinson. The community is located on the former Southern Railway and was incorporated in 1890.

A post office first began operation under the name Pheba in 1890.

In 2000, Pheba was the site of the first sporting event in which an all-black team participated in a contest sanctioned by the Mississippi Private School Association (MPSA), which was founded as an organization for segregation academies that originally existed to avoid integration of whites and blacks in public schools when Hebron Christian played against the all-black Christ Missionary and Industrial College High School (CM&I). CM&I had previously not played football for decades and fielded a team of only 14 players.

It was first named as a CDP in the 2020 Census which listed a population of 160.

== Demographics ==
Historical population
Census	Pop.	Note	%±
2020	160		—
U.S. Decennial Census; 2020

Pheba was first listed as a census designated place in the 2020 U.S. census.

=== 2020 census ===
Pheba CDP, Mississippi – Racial and ethnic composition Note: the US Census treats Hispanic/Latino as an ethnic category. This table excludes Latinos from the racial categories and assigns them to a separate category. Hispanics/Latinos may be of any race.
Race / Ethnicity (NH = Non-Hispanic)	Pop 2020	% 2020
White alone (NH)	98	61.25%
Black or African American alone (NH)	57	35.63%
Native American or Alaska Native alone (NH)	4	2.50%
Asian alone (NH)	0	0.00%
Pacific Islander alone (NH)	0	0.00%
Some Other Race alone (NH)	0	0.00%
Mixed Race or Multi-Racial (NH)	1	0.63%
Hispanic or Latino (any race)	0	0.00%
Total	160	100.00%

== Notable person ==
- William "Billy" Jefferson, NFL football player was born in Pheba.
