= Cedarbluff, Mississippi =

Settlement in Mississippi, U.S.

- Unincorporated community
- Location within Mississippi Location within the United States
- Coordinates: 33°35′12″N 88°49′56″W
- Country: United States
- State: Mississippi
- County: Clay
- Elevation: 266 ft (81 m)
- Time zone: UTC-6 (Central (CST))
  - Summer (DST): UTC-5 (CDT)
- ZIP code: 39741
- Area code: 662
- GNIS feature ID: 668181

Cedarbluff (or Cedar Bluff) is an unincorporated community in Clay County, Mississippi, United States. It is located in south central Clay County along Mississippi Highway 50.

== History ==
Cedarbluff is located on the former Southern Railway. Cedarbluff was formerly home to a school and two churches.

A post office operated under the name Cedar Bluff from 1847 to 1895 and began operating under the name Cedarbluff in 1895.

In 1915 an unnamed black man was lynched in Cedarbluff for allegedly entering the room of a white woman. In 1916, an African-American man, Jeff Brown was lynched by a mob "for accidentally bumping into a white girl as he ran to catch a train." Pictures of his lynching were sold to white citizens for five cents each and were used to intimidate African-Americans in the region.

In 1920, a destructive tornado struck near Cedarbluff, causing major damage and slaying 10.

On January 9, 2026, a mass shooting at three different locations in the area of Cedarbluff killed six people, including a 7-year-old child. A man was arrested and charged with multiple counts of murder as well as attempted murder, attempted sexual battery, burglary and vehicle theft. Four of the victims were his family members.
