= Mantee, Mississippi =

- Village
- Location of Mantee, Mississippi

- Location in the United States
- Coordinates: 33°43′50″N 89°3′36″W
- Country: United States
- State: Mississippi
- County: Webster

Area
  - Total: 4.61 sq mi (11.93 km^{2})
  - Land: 4.55 sq mi (11.79 km^{2})
  - Water: 0.050 sq mi (0.13 km^{2})
- Elevation: 335 ft (102 m)

Population (2020)
  - Total: 237
  - Density: 52/sq mi (20.1/km^{2})
- Time zone: UTC-6 (Central (CST))
  - Summer (DST): UTC-5 (CDT)
- FIPS code: 28-44960
- GNIS feature ID: 0673117

Mantee is a village in Webster County, Mississippi. As of the 2020 census, Mantee had a population of 237.

== Geography ==
Mantee is located at 33°43′50″N 89°3′36″W (33.730615, -89.060074).

According to the United States Census Bureau, the village has a total area of 1.7 square miles (4.4 km^{2}), of which 1.6 square miles (4.1 km^{2}) is land and 0.1 square miles (0.26 km^{2}) (3.51%) is water.

== Demographics ==
Historical population
Census	Pop.	Note	%±
1910	222		—
1920	249		12.2%
1930	219		−12.0%
1940	241		10.0%
1950	189		−21.6%
1960	166		−12.2%
1970	142		−14.5%
1980	158		11.3%
1990	134		−15.2%
2000	169		26.1%
2010	232		37.3%
2020	237		2.2%
U.S. Decennial Census

As of the 2010 census, there were 232 people, 95 households, and 70 families residing in the village. There were 115 housing units of which 20 were reported vacant. The racial makeup of the village was 99.1% White and 0.4% African American.

There were 115 households, out of which 23.7% had children under the age of 18 living with them, 65.3% were married couples living together, 6.3% had a female householder with no husband present, and 26.3% were non-families. 22.1% of all households were made up of individuals, and 30.5% had someone living alone who was 65 years of age or older. The average household size was 2.44 and the average family size was 2.89.

In the village, the population was spread out, with 7.3% under the age of five, 19,4% from five to 19, 1.7% from 20 to 24, 27,9% from 25 to 44, 26,2% from 45 to 64, and 17.2% who were 65 years of age or older. The median age was 41.5 years. For every 100 males, there were 127 females.

The median income for a household in the village was $49,375, and the median home price was $105,600. Males had a median income of $32,500 versus $23,750 for females. The per capita income for the village was $18,871. About 3.5% of families and 6.3% of the population were below the poverty line, including 9.7% of those under the age of eighteen and 8.2% of those 65 or over.

== Education ==
The Village of Mantee is served by the Webster County School District.
