= Chickasaw County, Mississippi =

County in Mississippi, United States

- County
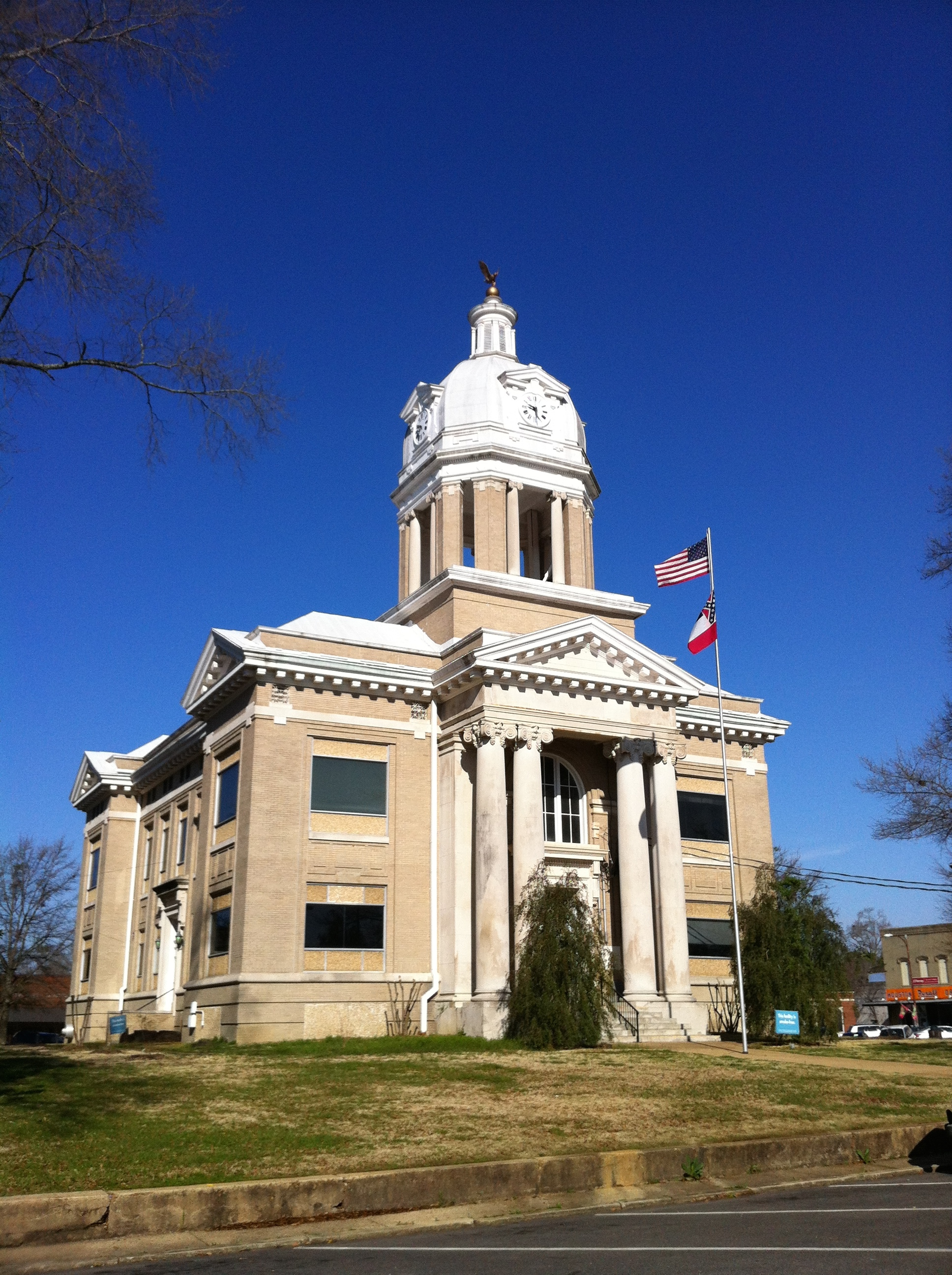
- East façade of the Chickasaw County Courthouse in Houston

- Location within the U.S. state of Mississippi
- Coordinates: 33°55′N 88°57′W
- Country: United States
- State: Mississippi
- Founded: 1836
- Named for: Chickasaw people
- Seat: Houston and Okolona
- Largest city: Houston

Area
  - Total: 504 sq mi (1,310 km^{2})
  - Land: 502 sq mi (1,300 km^{2})
  - Water: 2.5 sq mi (6.5 km^{2}) 0.5%

Population (2020)
  - Total: 17,106
  - Estimate (2025): 16,730 ▼
  - Density: 34.1/sq mi (13.2/km^{2})
- Time zone: UTC−6 (Central)
  - Summer (DST): UTC−5 (CDT)
- Congressional district: 1st
- Website: www.chickasawcoms.com

Chickasaw County is a county located in the U.S. state of Mississippi. As of the 2020 census, the population was 17,106. Its county seats are Houston and Okolona. The county is named for the Chickasaw people, who lived in this area for hundreds of years. Most were forcibly removed to Indian Territory in the 1830s, but some remained and became citizens of the state and the United States.

== History ==
The Mississippi state legislature created Chickasaw County in 1836, following the cession of the land by the Chickasaw Indians. It was quickly settled by Americans from the east, mainly from the Southern states. By the time of the Civil War, riverfront landings had been developed by the many large cotton plantations worked by slaves, who outnumbered the white residents of the county.

The American Civil War devastated the local economy, completely destroying the plantation-based infrastructure of Chickasaw County. The newly freed slaves had to adapt to the new labor system, in which the white landowners still retained partial control over their lives through the practice of sharecropping. The economy declined again in the late 19th century, when falling cotton prices reduced both black and white residents to poverty. Farmers eventually began diversifying their crops, and the economy slowly began to improve.

== Geography ==
According to the U.S. Census Bureau, the county has a total area of 504 square miles (1,310 km^{2}), of which 502 square miles (1,300 km^{2}) is land and 2.5 square miles (6.5 km^{2}) (0.5%) is water.

=== Major highways ===
- U.S. Route 45 Alternate (Mississippi)
- Mississippi Highway 8
- Mississippi Highway 15
- Mississippi Highway 32
- Mississippi Highway 41
- Mississippi Highway 47
- Natchez Trace Parkway

=== Adjacent counties ===
- Pontotoc County (north)
- Lee County (northeast)
- Monroe County (east)
- Clay County (southeast)
- Webster County (southwest)
- Calhoun County (west)

=== National protected areas ===
- Natchez Trace Parkway (part)
- Tombigbee National Forest (part)

== Demographics ==
Historical population
Census	Pop.	Note	%±
1840	2,955		—
1850	16,369		453.9%
1860	16,426		0.3%
1870	19,899		21.1%
1880	17,905		−10.0%
1890	19,891		11.1%
1900	19,892		0.0%
1910	22,846		14.9%
1920	22,212		−2.8%
1930	20,835		−6.2%
1940	21,427		2.8%
1950	18,951		−11.6%
1960	16,891		−10.9%
1970	16,805		−0.5%
1980	17,853		6.2%
1990	18,085		1.3%
2000	19,440		7.5%
2010	17,392		−10.5%
2020	17,106		−1.6%
2025 (est.)	16,730	▼	−2.2%
U.S. Decennial Census; 1790-1960 1900-1990; 1990-2000 2010-2013

=== Racial and ethnic composition ===
Chickasaw County, Mississippi – Racial and ethnic composition Note: the US Census treats Hispanic/Latino as an ethnic category. This table excludes Latinos from the racial categories and assigns them to a separate category. Hispanics/Latinos may be of any race.
Race / Ethnicity (NH = Non-Hispanic)	Pop 1980	Pop 1990	Pop 2000	Pop 2010	Pop 2020	% 1980	% 1990	% 2000	% 2010	% 2020
White alone (NH)	11,329	11,022	10,887	9,254	8,584	63.46%	60.95%	56.00%	53.21%	50.18%
Black or African American alone (NH)	6,339	6,944	7,967	7,292	7,407	35.51%	38.40%	40.98%	41.93%	43.30%
Native American or Alaska Native alone (NH)	14	20	28	22	13	0.08%	0.11%	0.14%	0.13%	0.08%
Asian alone (NH)	7	12	34	43	41	0.04%	0.07%	0.17%	0.25%	0.24%
Native Hawaiian or Pacific Islander alone (NH)	x	x	5	1	0	x	x	0.03%	0.01%	0.00%
Other race alone (NH)	6	2	0	7	15	0.03%	0.01%	0.00%	0.04%	0.09%
Mixed race or Multiracial (NH)	x	x	74	130	404	x	x	0.38%	0.75%	2.36%
Hispanic or Latino (any race)	158	85	445	643	642	0.89%	0.47%	2.29%	3.70%	3.75%
Total	17,853	18,085	19,440	17,392	17,106	100.00%	100.00%	100.00%	100.00%	100.00%

=== 2020 census ===
As of the 2020 census, the county had a population of 17,106. The median age was 41.0 years. 22.7% of residents were under the age of 18 and 19.2% of residents were 65 years of age or older. For every 100 females there were 92.9 males, and for every 100 females age 18 and over there were 90.5 males age 18 and over.

The racial makeup of the county was 50.6% White, 43.5% Black or African American, 0.2% American Indian and Alaska Native, 0.3% Asian, <0.1% Native Hawaiian and Pacific Islander, 2.5% from some other race, and 3.0% from two or more races. Hispanic or Latino residents of any race comprised 3.8% of the population.

<0.1% of residents lived in urban areas, while 100.0% lived in rural areas.

There were 6,778 households in the county, of which 30.7% had children under the age of 18 living in them. Of all households, 40.3% were married-couple households, 18.7% were households with a male householder and no spouse or partner present, and 35.7% were households with a female householder and no spouse or partner present. About 29.6% of all households were made up of individuals and 12.9% had someone living alone who was 65 years of age or older.

There were 7,789 housing units, of which 13.0% were vacant. Among occupied housing units, 72.1% were owner-occupied and 27.9% were renter-occupied. The homeowner vacancy rate was 1.0% and the rental vacancy rate was 16.4%.

=== 2010 census ===
As of the 2010 United States census, there were 17,392 people living in the county. 54.0% were White, 42.1% Black or African American, 0.3% Asian, 0.1% Native American, 2.5% of some other race and 1.0% of two or more races. 3.7% were Hispanic or Latino (of any race).

=== 2000 census ===
As of the census of 2000, there were 19,440 people, 7,253 households, and 5,287 families living in the county. The population density was 39 people per square mile (15 people/km^{2}). There were 7,981 housing units at an average density of 16 units per square mile (6.2 units/km^{2}). The racial makeup of the county was 56.89% White, 41.26% Black or African American, 0.19% Native American, 0.17% Asian, 0.04% Pacific Islander, 0.99% from other races, and 0.46% from two or more races. 2.29% of the population were Hispanic or Latino of any race.

According to the census of 2000, the largest ancestry groups in Chickasaw County were English 44.1%, African 41% and Scots-Irish 13.5%.

There were 7,253 households, out of which 36.30% had children under the age of 18 living with them, 50.80% were married couples living together, 18.00% had a female householder with no husband present, and 27.10% were non-families. 24.90% of all households were made up of individuals, and 11.90% had someone living alone who was 65 years of age or older. The average household size was 2.65 and the average family size was 3.17.

In the county, the population was spread out, with 28.60% under the age of 18, 9.30% from 18 to 24, 27.60% from 25 to 44, 21.00% from 45 to 64, and 13.50% who were 65 years of age or older. The median age was 34 years. For every 100 females there were 92.60 males. For every 100 females age 18 and over, there were 87.40 males.

The median income for a household in the county was $26,364, and the median income for a family was $33,819. Males had a median income of $25,459 versus $20,099 for females. The per capita income for the county was $13,279. About 16.80% of families and 20.00% of the population were below the poverty line, including 23.90% of those under age 18 and 22.40% of those age 65 or over.

== Communities ==
=== Cities ===
- Houston (county seat)
- Okolona (county seat)

=== Town ===
- New Houlka

=== Village ===
- Woodland

=== Census-designated place ===
- Van Vleet

=== Unincorporated communities ===
- Atlanta
- Buena Vista
- Egypt
- McCondy
- Pyland
- Shake Rag
- Sparta
- Thorn
- Trebloc

== Politics ==
United States presidential election results for Chickasaw County
Year	Republican		Democratic		Third party(ies)	
Year	No.	%	No.	%	No.	%
1912	19	2.00%	856	90.30%	73	7.70%
1916	47	3.61%	1,215	93.32%	40	3.07%
1920	194	16.67%	944	81.10%	26	2.23%
1924	86	6.07%	1,301	91.88%	29	2.05%
1928	171	10.26%	1,495	89.74%	0	0.00%
1932	16	1.08%	1,455	98.64%	4	0.27%
1936	18	1.14%	1,559	98.80%	1	0.06%
1940	58	3.18%	1,764	96.76%	1	0.05%
1944	180	8.51%	1,935	91.49%	0	0.00%
1948	12	0.61%	115	5.89%	1,827	93.50%
1952	685	27.51%	1,805	72.49%	0	0.00%
1956	231	11.24%	1,650	80.25%	175	8.51%
1960	385	15.17%	791	31.17%	1,362	53.66%
1964	3,138	91.83%	279	8.17%	0	0.00%
1968	381	7.38%	720	13.95%	4,062	78.68%
1972	3,753	84.66%	579	13.06%	101	2.28%
1976	2,581	45.10%	2,891	50.52%	251	4.39%
1980	2,540	40.13%	3,622	57.23%	167	2.64%
1984	3,605	60.52%	2,329	39.10%	23	0.39%
1988	3,390	55.35%	2,713	44.29%	22	0.36%
1992	3,150	44.96%	3,220	45.95%	637	9.09%
1996	2,535	42.75%	2,971	50.10%	424	7.15%
2000	3,549	49.46%	3,519	49.05%	107	1.49%
2004	4,193	50.26%	4,078	48.88%	72	0.86%
2008	4,395	48.52%	4,588	50.65%	75	0.83%
2012	3,994	46.97%	4,378	51.49%	131	1.54%
2016	4,127	52.31%	3,649	46.25%	114	1.44%
2020	4,175	51.28%	3,810	46.80%	156	1.92%
2024	4,079	56.39%	3,090	42.71%	65	0.90%

== Notable locals ==
- Singer-songwriter Bobbie Gentry, a Mississippi Musicians Hall of Fame inductee
- Bukka White, early blues performer
- William Raspberry, journalist
- Milan Williams, founding member of The Commodores
- Jim Hood, politician and former Mississippi Attorney General
- Jeff Busby, United States Representative who spearheaded the Natchez Trace Parkway
- Shaquille Vance, 2012 U.S. Paralympic National Championship, gold medal (100m), silver medal (200m)
- Ida Mae Brandon Gladney, central character in the Pulitzer Prize-winning nonfiction book The Warmth of Other Suns by Isabel Wilkerson

== In popular culture ==
Candyland, the plantation of the fictional Calvin Candie, played by Leonardo DiCaprio in Quentin Tarantino's film Django Unchained, is located in Chickasaw County.

Titus Andromedon, from the Netflix series Unbreakable Kimmy Schmidt, is from Chickasaw County.

== See also ==
- Chickasaw County School District
- National Register of Historic Places listings in Chickasaw County, Mississippi
