= Clay County, Mississippi =

County in Mississippi, United States

- County
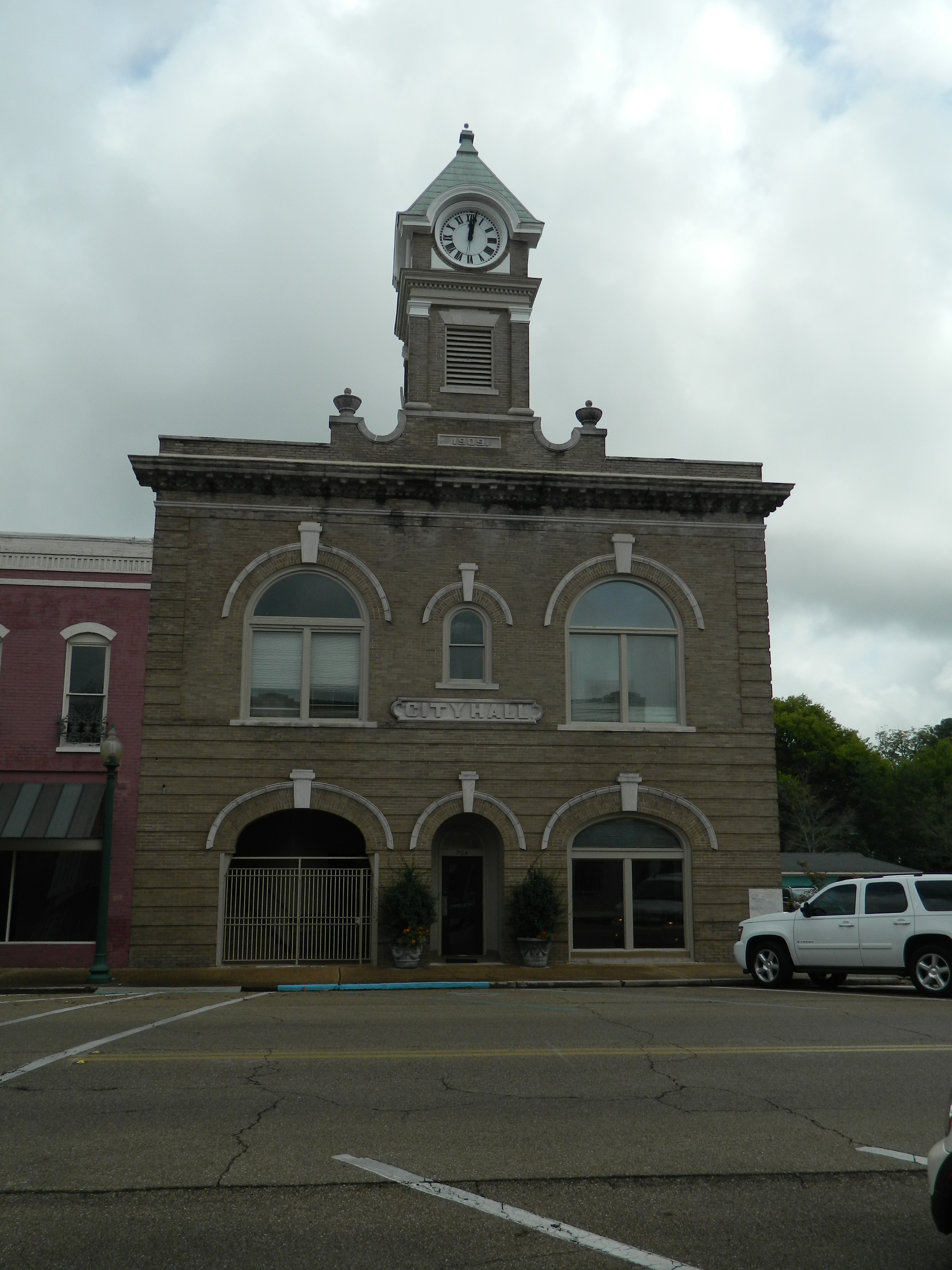
- West Point City Hall at West Point Central City Historic District.

- Location within the U.S. state of Mississippi
- Coordinates: 33°39′N 88°46′W
- Country: United States
- State: Mississippi
- Founded: 1871
- Named for: Henry Clay
- Seat: West Point
- Largest city: West Point

Area
  - Total: 416 sq mi (1,080 km^{2})
  - Land: 410 sq mi (1,100 km^{2})
  - Water: 5.9 sq mi (15 km^{2}) 1.4%

Population (2020)
  - Total: 18,636
  - Estimate (2025): 18,238 ▼
  - Density: 45/sq mi (18/km^{2})
- Time zone: UTC−6 (Central)
  - Summer (DST): UTC−5 (CDT)
- Congressional district: 1st
- Website: www.claycountyms.com/index.php/

Clay County is a county in the U.S. state of Mississippi. As of the 2020 United States census, the population was 18,636. Its county seat is West Point. Its name is in honor of American statesman Henry Clay, member of the United States Senate from Kentucky and United States Secretary of State in the 19th century. J. Wesley Caradine, an African American, was the first state representative for Clay County after it was established in 1871. The federal government formerly designated Clay County as the West Point Micropolitan Statistical Area, but the county lost that status in 2013. It is part of the Golden Triangle region of northeastern Mississippi.

== Geography ==
According to the U.S. Census Bureau, the county has a total area of 416 square miles (1,080 km^{2}), of which 410 square miles (1,100 km^{2}) is land and 5.9 square miles (15 km^{2}) (1.4%) is water.

=== Major highways ===
- U.S. Route 45 Alternate
- Mississippi Highway 25
- Mississippi Highway 46
- Mississippi Highway 47
- Mississippi Highway 50

=== Adjacent counties ===
- Chickasaw County (north)
- Monroe County (northeast)
- Lowndes County (southeast)
- Oktibbeha County (south)
- Webster County (west)

=== National protected area ===
- Natchez Trace Parkway (part)

== Demographics ==
Historical population
Census	Pop.	Note	%±
1880	17,367		—
1890	18,607		7.1%
1900	19,563		5.1%
1910	20,203		3.3%
1920	17,490		−13.4%
1930	17,931		2.5%
1940	19,030		6.1%
1950	17,757		−6.7%
1960	18,933		6.6%
1970	18,840		−0.5%
1980	21,082		11.9%
1990	21,120		0.2%
2000	21,979		4.1%
2010	20,634		−6.1%
2020	18,636		−9.7%
2025 (est.)	18,238	▼	−2.1%
U.S. Decennial Census; 1790-1960 1900-1990; 1990-2000 2010-2013

=== Racial and ethnic composition ===
Clay County, Mississippi – Racial and ethnic composition Note: the US Census treats Hispanic/Latino as an ethnic category. This table excludes Latinos from the racial categories and assigns them to a separate category. Hispanics/Latinos may be of any race.
Race / Ethnicity (NH = Non-Hispanic)	Pop 1980	Pop 1990	Pop 2000	Pop 2010	Pop 2020	% 1980	% 1990	% 2000	% 2010	% 2020
White alone (NH)	10,420	9,745	9,332	8,276	7,196	49.43%	46.14%	42.46%	40.11%	38.61%
Black or African American alone (NH)	10,446	11,245	12,331	11,977	10,785	49.55%	53.24%	56.10%	58.04%	57.87%
Native American or Alaska Native alone (NH)	4	19	9	27	35	0.02%	0.09%	0.04%	0.13%	0.19%
Asian alone (NH)	43	31	35	45	57	0.20%	0.15%	0.16%	0.22%	0.31%
Native Hawaiian or Pacific Islander alone (NH)	x	x	2	2	1	x	x	0.01%	0.01%	0.01%
Other race alone (NH)	5	0	0	14	37	0.02%	0.00%	0.00%	0.07%	0.20%
Mixed race or Multiracial (NH)	x	x	80	94	339	x	x	0.36%	0.46%	1.82%
Hispanic or Latino (any race)	164	80	190	199	186	0.78%	0.38%	0.86%	0.96%	1.00%
Total	21,082	21,120	21,979	20,634	18,636	100.00%	100.00%	100.00%	100.00%	100.00%

=== 2020 census ===
As of the 2020 census, the county had a population of 18,636. The median age was 42.6 years. 21.6% of residents were under the age of 18 and 20.2% of residents were 65 years of age or older. For every 100 females there were 88.5 males, and for every 100 females age 18 and over there were 85.3 males age 18 and over.

The racial makeup of the county was 38.7% White, 58.0% Black or African American, 0.2% American Indian and Alaska Native, 0.3% Asian, <0.1% Native Hawaiian and Pacific Islander, 0.7% from some other race, and 2.1% from two or more races. Hispanic or Latino residents of any race comprised 1.0% of the population.

43.6% of residents lived in urban areas, while 56.4% lived in rural areas.

There were 7,771 households in the county, of which 29.6% had children under the age of 18 living in them. Of all households, 37.5% were married-couple households, 18.9% were households with a male householder and no spouse or partner present, and 39.3% were households with a female householder and no spouse or partner present. About 30.9% of all households were made up of individuals and 13.9% had someone living alone who was 65 years of age or older.

There were 8,985 housing units, of which 13.5% were vacant. Among occupied housing units, 70.2% were owner-occupied and 29.8% were renter-occupied. The homeowner vacancy rate was 1.7% and the rental vacancy rate was 15.0%.

=== 2010 census ===
As of the 2010 United States census, there were 20,634 people living in the county. 58.2% were Black or African American, 40.5% White, 0.2% Asian, 0.1% Native American, 0.3% of some other race and 0.6% of two or more races. 1.0% were Hispanic or Latino (of any race).

=== 2000 census ===
As of the census of 2000, there were 21,979 people, 8,152 households, and 5,885 families living in the county. The population density was 54 people per square mile (21 people/km^{2}). There were 8,810 housing units at an average density of 22 per square mile (8.5/km^{2}). The racial makeup of the county was 56.33% Black or African American, 42.82% White, 0.05% Native American, 0.16% Asian, 0.01% Pacific Islander, 0.21% from other races, and 0.42% from two or more races. 0.86% of the population were Hispanic or Latino of any race.

According to the census of 2000, the largest ancestry groups in Clay County were African 56.3%, English 35% and Scots-Irish 4.5%.

There were 8,152 households, out of which 35.70% had children under the age of 18 living with them, 45.80% were married couples living together, 22.40% had a female householder with no husband present, and 27.80% were non-families. 25.50% of all households were made up of individuals, and 11.00% had someone living alone who was 65 years of age or older. The average household size was 2.64 and the average family size was 3.19.

In the county, the population was spread out, with 28.80% under the age of 18, 10.40% from 18 to 24, 26.50% from 25 to 44, 21.10% from 45 to 64, and 13.10% who were 65 years of age or older. The median age was 34 years. For every 100 females there were 89.10 males. For every 100 females age 18 and over, there were 83.60 males.

The median income for a household in the county was $27,372, and the median income for a family was $35,461. Males had a median income of $30,038 versus $19,473 for females. The per capita income for the county was $14,512. About 19.20% of families and 23.50% of the population were below the poverty line, including 34.20% of those under age 18 and 21.90% of those age 65 or over.

== Law enforcement ==
Clay County has a sheriff law enforcement system.

== Education ==
Clay County is within the service area of the East Mississippi Community College system.

=== Public schools ===
- West Point Consolidated School District is the sole school district in the county. It operates West Point High School, located in the county.

Effective July 1, 2015 the West Point School District and the Clay County School District was consolidated into the West Point Consolidated School District.

== Communities ==
=== City ===
- West Point (county seat)

=== Census-designated place ===
- Pheba

=== Unincorporated communities ===
- Abbott
- Cedarbluff
- Hopewell
- Montpelier
- Tibbee
- Una
- Waverly
- White Station

=== Ghost town ===
- Palo Alto

== Politics ==
Clay County is a Democratic stronghold, owing to its high African-American population. It last supported a Republican candidate in 1984, when it was narrowly won by Ronald Reagan.

United States presidential election results for Clay County, Mississippi
Year	Republican		Democratic		Third party(ies)	
Year	No.	%	No.	%	No.	%
1912	4	0.60%	628	93.45%	40	5.95%
1916	27	3.14%	832	96.74%	1	0.12%
1920	48	5.84%	771	93.80%	3	0.36%
1924	82	6.73%	1,136	93.27%	0	0.00%
1928	128	8.08%	1,456	91.92%	0	0.00%
1932	34	2.42%	1,371	97.44%	2	0.14%
1936	32	2.46%	1,271	97.54%	0	0.00%
1940	103	7.71%	1,232	92.22%	1	0.07%
1944	109	8.60%	1,158	91.40%	0	0.00%
1948	22	1.30%	59	3.50%	1,605	95.20%
1952	1,077	46.68%	1,230	53.32%	0	0.00%
1956	410	18.25%	1,225	54.52%	612	27.24%
1960	451	19.01%	626	26.39%	1,295	54.60%
1964	2,848	92.65%	226	7.35%	0	0.00%
1968	494	8.97%	1,510	27.41%	3,505	63.62%
1972	4,035	71.39%	1,410	24.95%	207	3.66%
1976	3,017	44.13%	3,514	51.40%	306	4.48%
1980	3,439	43.18%	4,275	53.68%	250	3.14%
1984	4,112	50.23%	4,046	49.42%	29	0.35%
1988	3,645	48.26%	3,849	50.96%	59	0.78%
1992	3,297	38.50%	4,620	53.95%	646	7.54%
1996	2,948	38.97%	4,267	56.41%	349	4.61%
2000	3,570	43.72%	4,515	55.30%	80	0.98%
2004	4,342	47.51%	4,753	52.01%	44	0.48%
2008	4,466	40.26%	6,558	59.12%	68	0.61%
2012	4,291	38.76%	6,712	60.62%	69	0.62%
2016	4,150	41.49%	5,722	57.20%	131	1.31%
2020	4,181	41.03%	5,844	57.36%	164	1.61%
2024	4,017	44.35%	4,960	54.76%	80	0.88%

== See also ==
- National Register of Historic Places listings in Clay County, Mississippi
