= Mississippi Highway 388 =

Highway in Mississippi

Mississippi Highway 388
- MS 388 highlighted in orange

Route information
- Maintained by MDOT
- Length: 15.933 mi (25.642 km)
- Existed: c. 1957–present

Major junctions
- West end: US 45 Alt. / MS 852 in Brooksville
- US 45 in Brooksville
- East end: SR 86 near Pickensville, AL

Location
- Country: United States
- State: Mississippi
- Counties: Noxubee

Highway system
- Mississippi State Highway System; Interstate; US; State
← MS 385	→ MS 389

Mississippi Highway 388 (MS 388) is a state highway in eastern Mississippi. The route starts at the intersection of U.S. Route 45 Alternate (US 45 Alt.) and MS 852 in Brooksville, and it travels east to US 45 soon after. The route intersects MS 792 near Cliftonville, and it ends at Alabama State Route 86 (SR 86) at the Alabama–Mississippi state line. MS 388 was designated around 1957, from US 45 to a point west of the state line. The route was extended to Bigbee Valley and to the state line by 1974 and 1990, respectively.

== Route description ==
Traffic volume on Mississippi Highway 388
Location	Volume
East of US 45 Alt.	1,400
East of Pilgrim Rest Road	1,500
West of Sunny Lane Road	980
West of Sandyland Road	980
Data was measured in 2018 in terms of AADT; Source:

All of MS 388 is located eastern in Noxubee County. The route is legally defined in Mississippi Code § 65-3-3, and all of it is maintained by the Mississippi Department of Transportation (MDOT), as part of the Mississippi State Highway System.

The route starts at the intersection of US 45 Alt. and MS 852 in Brooksville, and it travels east to US 45. The road leaves the city limits of Brooksville east of the intersection, and it travels south-southeast to Pilgrims Rest Road, where it turns east towards Deerbrook. The road crosses over Bogue Chitto and passes through Deerbrook. West of Cliftonville, MS 388 intersects the southern terminus of MS 792. Continuing through rural Noxubee County, the route turns northeast at Stevenson Road. At Togo Road, MS 388 turns eastward. After turning northeast at Fox Chase Road west of Bigbee Valley, the road enters into a forest and turns southeast at Clayton Road. At the Alabama–Mississippi state line, MS 388 ends and SR 86 continues east to Pickensville.

== History ==
By 1957, MS 388 was designated along an asphalt road from US 45 east of Brooksville to a gravel road leading to the Alabama–Mississippi state line. The western terminus was moved to the northeast of Brooksville one year later. By 1963, the gravel road east of the eastern terminus in Cliftonville was transferred from state maintenance to county maintenance. MS 388 was extended eastwards to Bigbee Valley by 1974. The route was widened and built up from Brooksville to Bigbee Valley in 1986, to improve access to a Weyerhaeuser paper mill. Improvements to the route east of Bigbee Valley were not completed, as it was owned by Noxubee County, and MDOT could not take ownership until the road was upgraded. This led to truck drivers taking longer routes to the mill, as their loads were above the legal limit for the route. In March 1988, a Weyerhaeuser pulp mill was approved for construction, and Noxubee County received federal funding to rebuild the route. MS 388 was extended to the state line by 1990, with all sections paved in asphalt.

== Major intersections ==
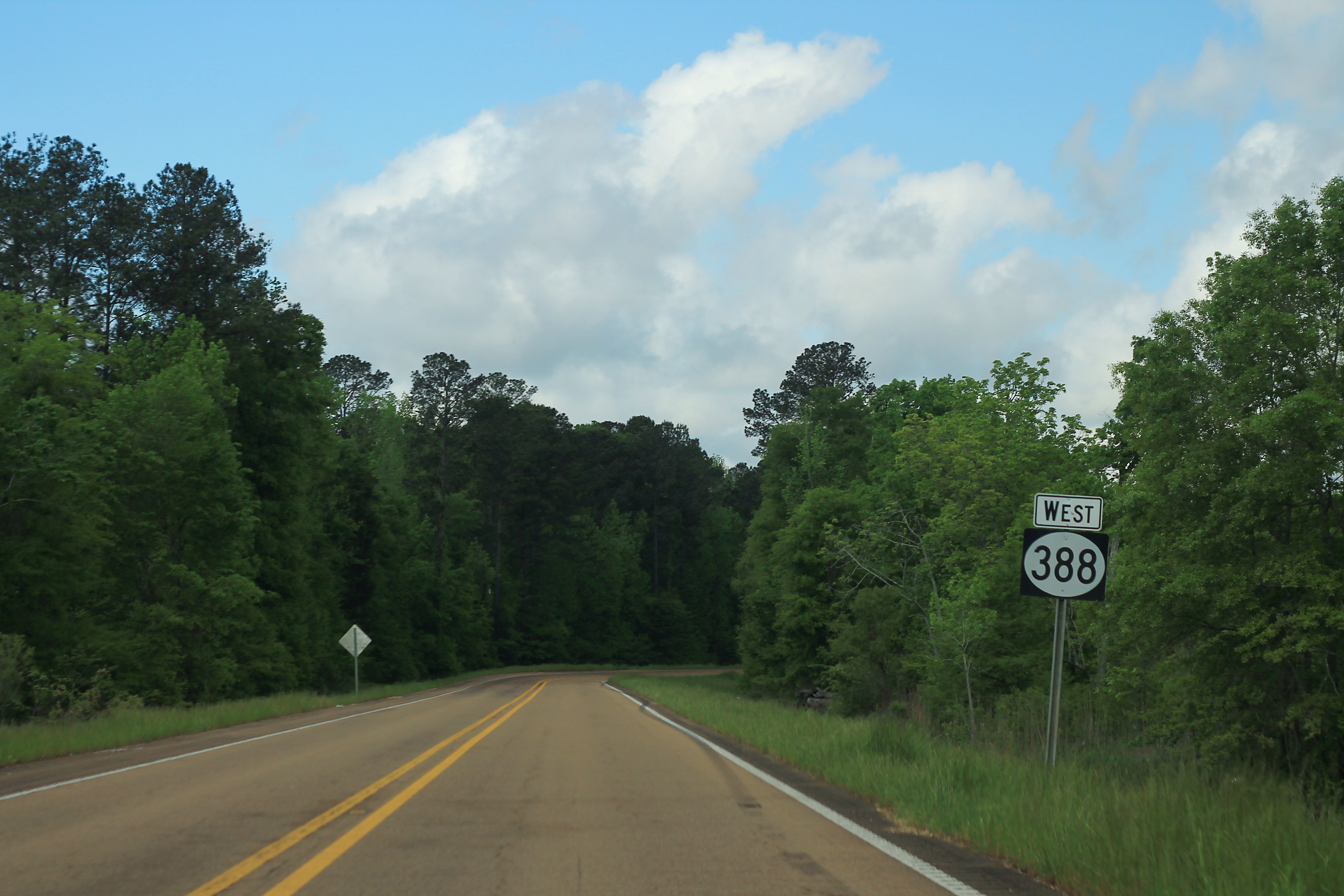
MS 388 near the Alabama–Mississippi state line

The entire route is in Noxubee County.

Location	mi	km	Destinations	Notes
Brooksville	0.0	0.0	US 45 Alt. – West Point, Macon	Western terminus of MS 388
Brooksville	0.0	0.0	MS 852 south (Old US 45) – Brooksville	Northern terminus of MS 852
Brooksville	0.4	0.64	US 45 – Columbus, Macon	
	7.9	12.7	MS 792 west	Eastern terminus of MS 792
	15.9	25.6	SR 86 east – Pickensville	Eastern terminus; Alabama state line
1.000 mi = 1.609 km; 1.000 km = 0.621 mi
