= John Alton Phillips =

American politician

Member of the Mississippi House of Representatives from the Noxubee County district
- In office January 1944 – June 12, 1965
- In office January 1932 – January 1940

Personal details
- Born: June 8, 1905 Carrollton, Alabama, U.S.
- Died: June 12, 1965 (aged 60) Macon, Mississippi, U.S.
- Party: Democratic

John Alton Phillips (June 8, 1905 - June 12, 1965) was an American lawyer and Democratic politician. He was a member of the Mississippi House of Representatives from 1932 to 1940 and from 1944 until his death in 1965.

== Biography ==
John Alton Phillips was born on June 8, 1905, in Carrollton, Alabama. He moved to Brooksville, Mississippi, in 1918. He graduated from the University of Alabama and from Cumberland University, receiving his law degree at the latter. He first became a member of the Mississippi House of Representatives in 1932 and served until 1940. He was re-elected in 1944 and served continuously until his death at his home in Macon, Mississippi, on June 12, 1965.
