= Mississippi Highway 792 =

Highway in Mississippi, United States

Mississippi Highway 792
- MS 792 highlighted in violet

Route information
- Maintained by MDOT
- Length: 13.216 mi (21.269 km)
- Existed: 1998–present

Major junctions
- West end: US 45 north of Brooksville
- East end: MS 388 east of Brooksville

Location
- Country: United States
- State: Mississippi
- Counties: Lowndes, Noxubee

Highway system
- Mississippi State Highway System; Interstate; US; State
← MS 791	→ MS 793

Mississippi Highway 792 (MS 792) is a road in eastern Mississippi. It starts at U.S. Route 45 (US 45), and travels east. Near halfway of the route, SR 792 turns south and continues to its eastern terminus at MS 388. The highway was designated in 1998, and no major changes have been made since.

== Route description ==
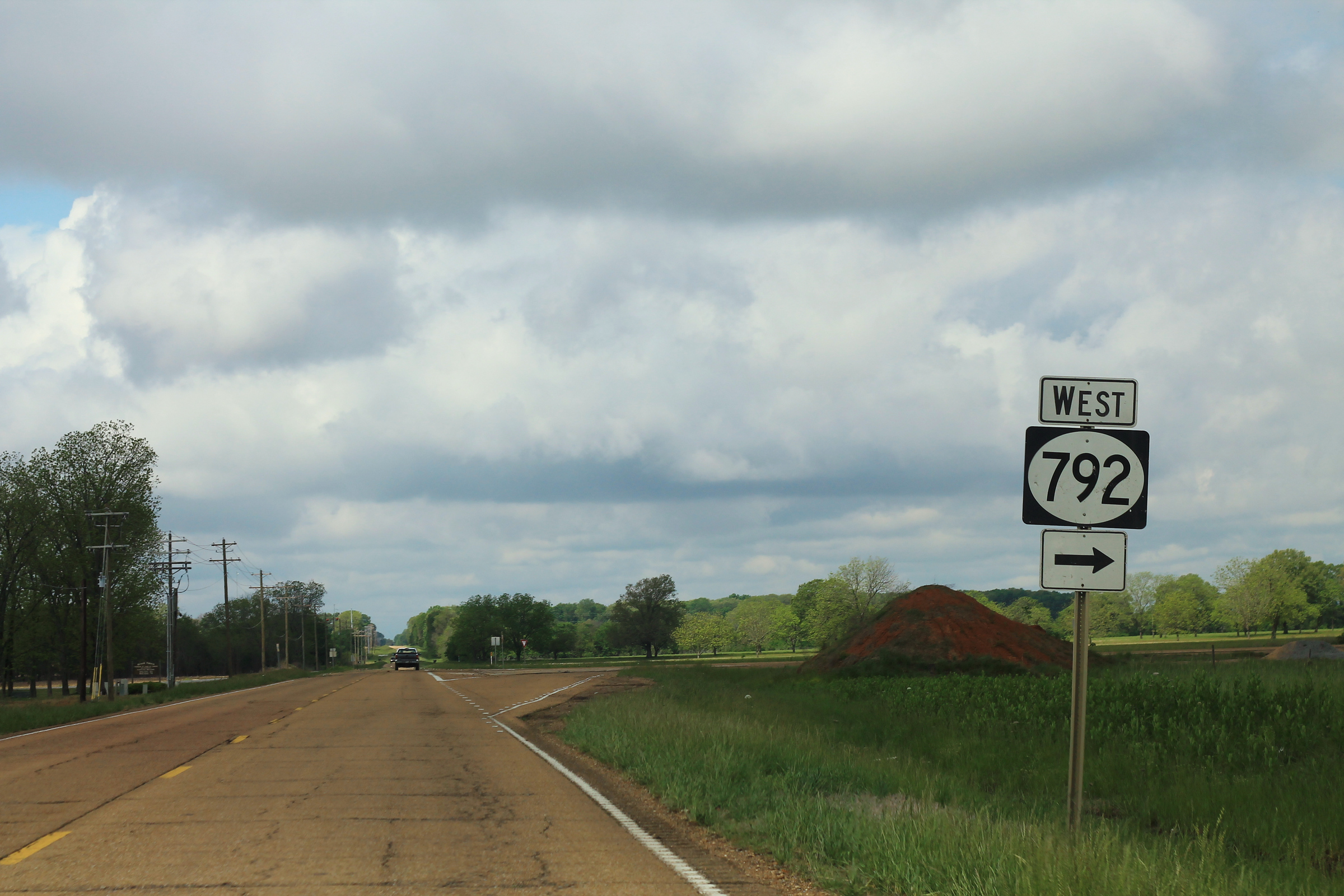
MS 792 at MS 388

MS 792 is located in southern Lowndes and northern Noxubee counties. In 2012, Mississippi Department of Transportation (MDOT) calculated as many as 1,800 vehicles traveling west of Trinity Road and Weyerhaeuser Road, and as few as 540 vehicles traveling south of Bluitt Road. The route is legally defined in Mississippi Code § 65-3-3, and is maintained by the Mississippi Department of Transportation.

MS 792 starts at a T-intersection with US 45, near the Black Prairie wildlife management area. It travels east along Carson Road, going through a small group of trees and farmland. At Gun Club Road, the landscape changes completely into farmland. Near 3.5 miles (5.6 km) later, Carson Road intersects Weyerhaeuser Road, that leads to cellulose fiber mills. MS 792 later turns southeastward at Old Macon Road, and crosses over a river. South of Plum Grove Road, the route shifts slightly to the west. Old Macon Road enters Noxubee County, while crossing over a small creek. MS 792 continues south for a few more miles, before ending at MS 388.

== History ==
The route was constructed by 1998, connecting from US 45 to MS 388. MS 792 was fully paved, and no significant changes have happened on the route since.

== Major intersections ==
County	Location	mi	km	Destinations	Notes
Lowndes		0.000	0.000	US 45	
Noxubee		13.216	21.269	MS 388	
1.000 mi = 1.609 km; 1.000 km = 0.621 mi
