= GTR =

GTR may refer to:

== Transportation ==
- Great River Railroad, in Mississippi, US
- Grand Trunk Railway, a defunct North American railway
- Golden Triangle Regional Airport (IATA and FAA LID codes), serving Columbus, Mississippi, US
- Govia Thameslink Railway, a British railway operator
- Greater Thameslink Railway, Govia Thameslink Railway's nationalised successor
- GTR Euroseries, a short-lived European auto racing series
- Global Technical Regulations, a 1998 multinational agreement regarding vehicle regulations

=== Automobiles ===
- Gran Turismo (racing), a type of sports car
  - BMW M3 GTR
  - Holden Torana GTR
  - Isuzu Bellett GT-R
  - Mazda Familia GT-R
  - McLaren F1 GTR
  - McLaren P1 GTR
  - McLaren Senna GTR
  - Mercedes-AMG GT R
  - Mercedes-Benz CLK GTR
  - Nissan Skyline GT-R
  - Nissan GT-R
  - Porsche 718 GTR Coupe Prototype 1962
  - Porsche 924 Carrera GTR
  - Toyota Celica 2000 GTR
  - Ultima GTR
  - Ford Mustang GT-R Concept car

== Science and medicine ==
- General theory of relativity, also known as General relativity, in physics
- Generalised time reversible, in biology
- Guided tissue regeneration, in dentistry

== Video games ==
- GTR – FIA GT Racing Game, a 2005 game
- GTR Evolution, a 2008 game
- GTR Group, owner of the developer Mad Catz

== Other uses ==
- GTR (band), a British rock band
  - GTR (album), their sole official studio album
- Gareth Emery, British trance producer and DJ
- Gateway to Research (Gtr), UK research information portal
- GTR-18 Smokey Sam, an American SAM training rocket
- Green tree reservoir, flooded forest land

== See also ==
- GDR (disambiguation)
- GT (disambiguation)
- JTR (disambiguation)
