= Larry Anderson =

Larry Anderson may refer to:

- Larry Anderson (actor) (born 1952), American actor and magician
- Larry Anderson (baseball) (born 1952), former MLB pitcher
- Larry Anderson (American football) (born 1956), former NFL player
- Larry J. Anderson (born 1947), American virologist
- Larry Anderson (basketball), American basketball coach
- Larry Anderson, author of a 2002 biography of Benton MacKaye
- Larry Anderson, American actor known for the 2004 reality television special Seriously, Dude, I'm Gay

== See also ==
- Lawrence Anderson (disambiguation)
- Larry Andersen (born 1953), American baseball pitcher and color commentator
