= William Lucas =

William Lucas, Bill, or Billy Lucas may refer to:

== Law and politics ==
- William Lucas (Virginia politician) (1800–1877), American politician and lawyer from Virginia
- William V. Lucas (1835–1921), American politician representing South Dakota
- William Thomas Lucas (1875–1973), Canadian farmer and federal politician
- William Brooks Lucas (1891–1970), American politician and lawyer from Mississippi
- William Lucas (Michigan politician) (1928–2022), American politician in Michigan
- Bill Lucas (Missouri politician), American politician in Missouri

== Sports ==
- Bill Lucas (rugby league) (fl. 1910s-1920s), Australian rugby league player
- Bill Lucas (runner) (1917–2018), British long-distance runner
- Billy Lucas (1918–1998), Welsh footballer
- Bill Lucas (baseball) (1936–1979), American baseball executive
- Bill Lucas (rower) (born 1987), British rower

== Others ==
- William Lucas (bishop) (1883–1945), English Anglican bishop
- William R. Lucas (1922–2025), American space engineer and NASA executive
- Bill Lucas (architect) (1924–2001), Australian architect
- William Lucas (actor) (1925–2016), British film and television actor
- Bill Lucas (academic) (born 1956), English social entrepreneur and researcher
