= Sherman W. White =

American fighter pilot and Tuskegee Airman (1919–1943)

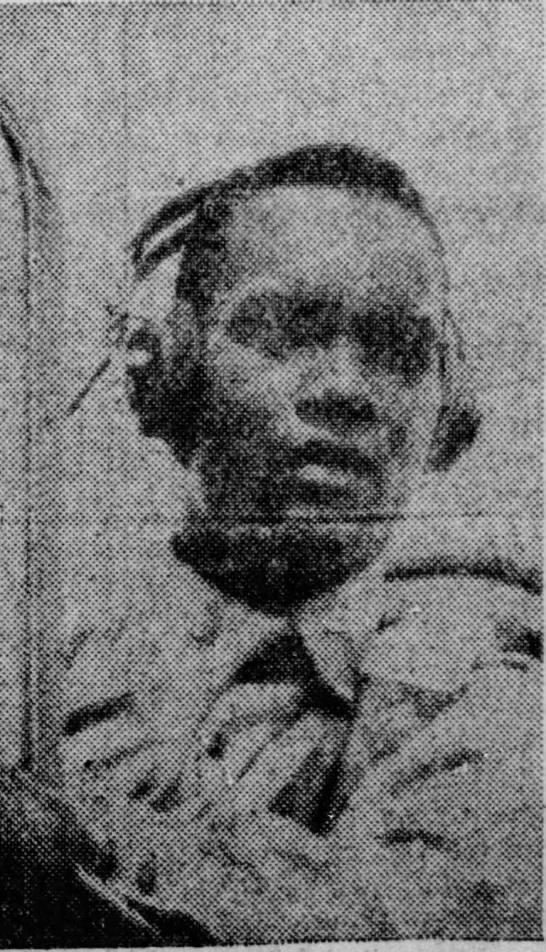
- White in 1943
- Born: Sherman Windham White, Jr. October 17, 1919; Macon, Mississippi, Noxubee County US
- Died: July 2, 1943 (aged 23); Sicily
- Resting place: Remains not recovered, Memorialized at the North Africa American Cemetery and Memorial, Carthage, Tunisia
- Education: University of Chicago(did not finish)
- Occupations: Military officer; fighter pilot
- Years active: 1941–1943

Sherman Windham White Jr. (October 17, 1919 – July 2, 1943) †) was a U.S. Army Air Force officer and combat fighter pilot with the all-African American 332nd Fighter Group's 99th Fighter Squadron, best known as the Tuskegee Airmen.

One of the United States military first combat fighter pilots, White was the first African American U.S. military combat fighter pilot killed during an aerial combat mission.

== Early life and education ==
Sherman Windham White, Jr. was born on October 17, 1919, in Macon, Mississippi, Noxubee County. He was the son of Sherman White Sr. and Nettie White, both middle-class grammar school teachers in Elmore, Alabama. White Sr. and Nettie had three other children: Willa White, James White, and Samson White.

White attended the University of Chicago. All of the White children would graduate from college except White Jr., who left the University of Chicago to become a combat pilot. He persuaded his parents to move from Elmore, Alabama to back to his parents' old city, Montgomery, Alabama. He used his officer salary to make payments on the family's newly acquired home at 694 West Jeff Davis Avenue. His sister Willa served in World War II as a member of the WAC. His brother James served in World War II as a member of the U.S. Marine Corps. White's brother Samson served in the U.S. Army during the Korean War.

On March 27, 1939, White was initiated in Kappa Alpha Psi fraternity, Iota chapter at the University of Chicago.

== Military service, Tuskegee Airmen ==
In 1941, White left the University of Chicago after being admitted to the U.S. Army Air Corps's aviation program at the Tuskegee Army Air Field in Tuskegee, Alabama. On May 20, 1942, White graduated as a member of Tuskegee aviation's 3rd ever Single Engine Section Cadet Class SE-42-E, receiving his wings and a commission as a 2nd Lieutenant. Graduating Cadet Class - Single Engine Section - SE-42-E. White was assigned to the 332nd Fighter Group's 99th Fighter Squadron which was declared combat-ready on September 15, 1942. On April 24, 1943, White and the 99th Fighter Squadron were deployed in North Africa.

At the time of his death in 1943, White held the rank of First Lieutenant with service number assignment, O-789431.

== Death ==
On July 2, 1943, White and the 99th Fighter Squadron flew in a 48-plane escort mission to protect twelve B-25 bombers en route to a German Luftwaffe base in Sicily. Mediterranean. Though the squadron successfully escorted the bombers to the base, White and fellow pilot Lt. James L. McCullin failed to return to their base in Tunisia. Only July 3, 1943, the Royal Air Force sent a plane to search the flight route to no avail. A week later, the U.S. Department of War sent "missing in action" letters to White and McCullin's families. Several weeks later, after finding no trace of both men or their P-40L Warhawks #42-10941, the War Department sent "We regret to inform you" notices to the men's families. No traces of White and McCullin or their planes have ever been found. On July 4, 1944, the War Department officially declared White dead. White and McCullin are believed to have been among the first African American pilots killed during an aerial combat mission.

Though White's final resting place is unknown, his name is listed on the Tablet of the Missing at the North Africa American Cemetery and Memorial in Carthage, Tunisia. White was posthumously awarded the Purple Heart.

== Unit assignments ==
- 1941–1942, AAF MOS 770, Aviation Cadet Flight School, Tuskegee AAF
- 1942–1943, AAF MOS 1055, 99th Fighter Squadron, Fardjouna Airfield
- 1943–1943, AAF MOS 1055, 33rd Fighter Group
- 1943–1943, AAF MOS 1055, 324th Fighter Group

== Awards ==
- Air Medal
- Purple Heart
- United States Aviator Badge
- World War II Victory Medal
- American Campaign Medal
- Army Good Conduct Medal
- European–African–Middle Eastern Campaign Medal

== Legacy ==
- Since World War II, there have been several erroneous accounts attributing White and McCullin's death to a mid-air collision or take-off crash in Tunisia. According to the 99th Fighter Squadron's MACR, there is no evidence that White and McCullin collided in Tunisia.
- In 1946, the all-white Civitan International of Montgomery, Alabama invited all next-of-kin to a memorial to honor Montgomery County, Alabama citizens who lost their lives during World War II. When White's parents' arrived, they were refused seating based on their race. The Whites left before the ceremony began. Several weeks later a Civitan leader made a private apology to the Whites. No public apology was ever made.
- In 2004, the Montgomery Area Chamber of Commerce Historical Preservation and Promotion Foundation & the Alabama Historical Association erected a historical marker at the intersection of West Jeff Davis Avenue and Adeline Street, near White's childhood home, 694 West Jeff Davis Avenue, Montgomery, Alabama, in Montgomery County - 32° 21.972′ N, 86° 19.173′ W.

== See also ==
- Executive Order 9981
- List of Tuskegee Airmen
- List of Tuskegee Airmen Cadet Pilot Graduation Classes
- Military history of African Americans
