= Sam D. Hamilton Noxubee National Wildlife Refuge =

United States National Wildlife Refuge in Mississippi

Noxubee National Wildlife Refuge
- IUCN category IV (habitat/species management area)
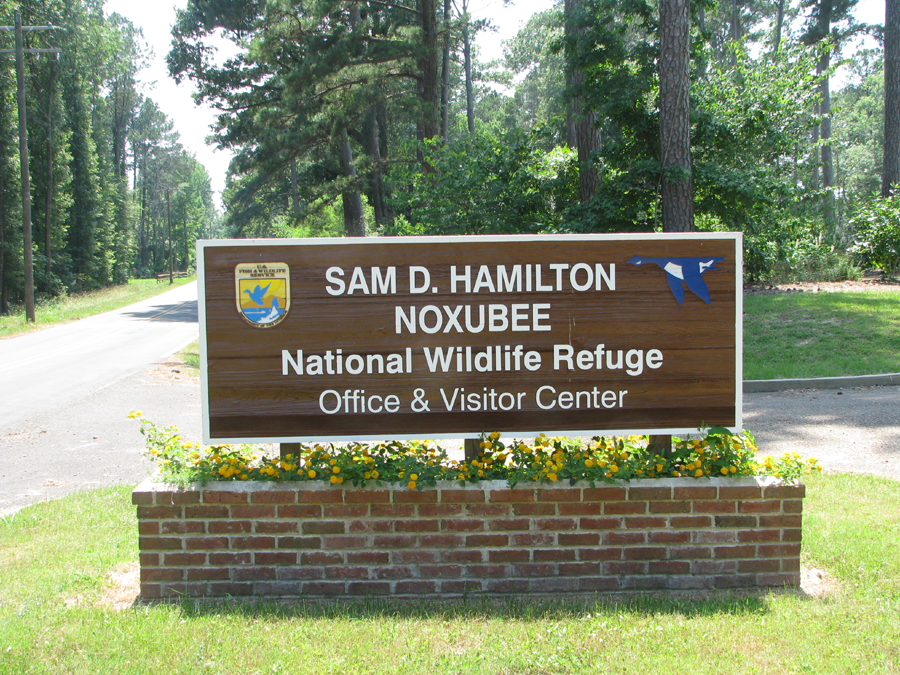

- Location within Mississippi Location within the United States
- Location: Mississippi, USA
- Nearest city: Brooksville, Mississippi
- Coordinates: 33°17′39.7608″N 88°46′43.6801″W
- Area: 48,000 acres (190 km^{2})
- Established: 1940
- Governing body: U.S. Fish and Wildlife Service
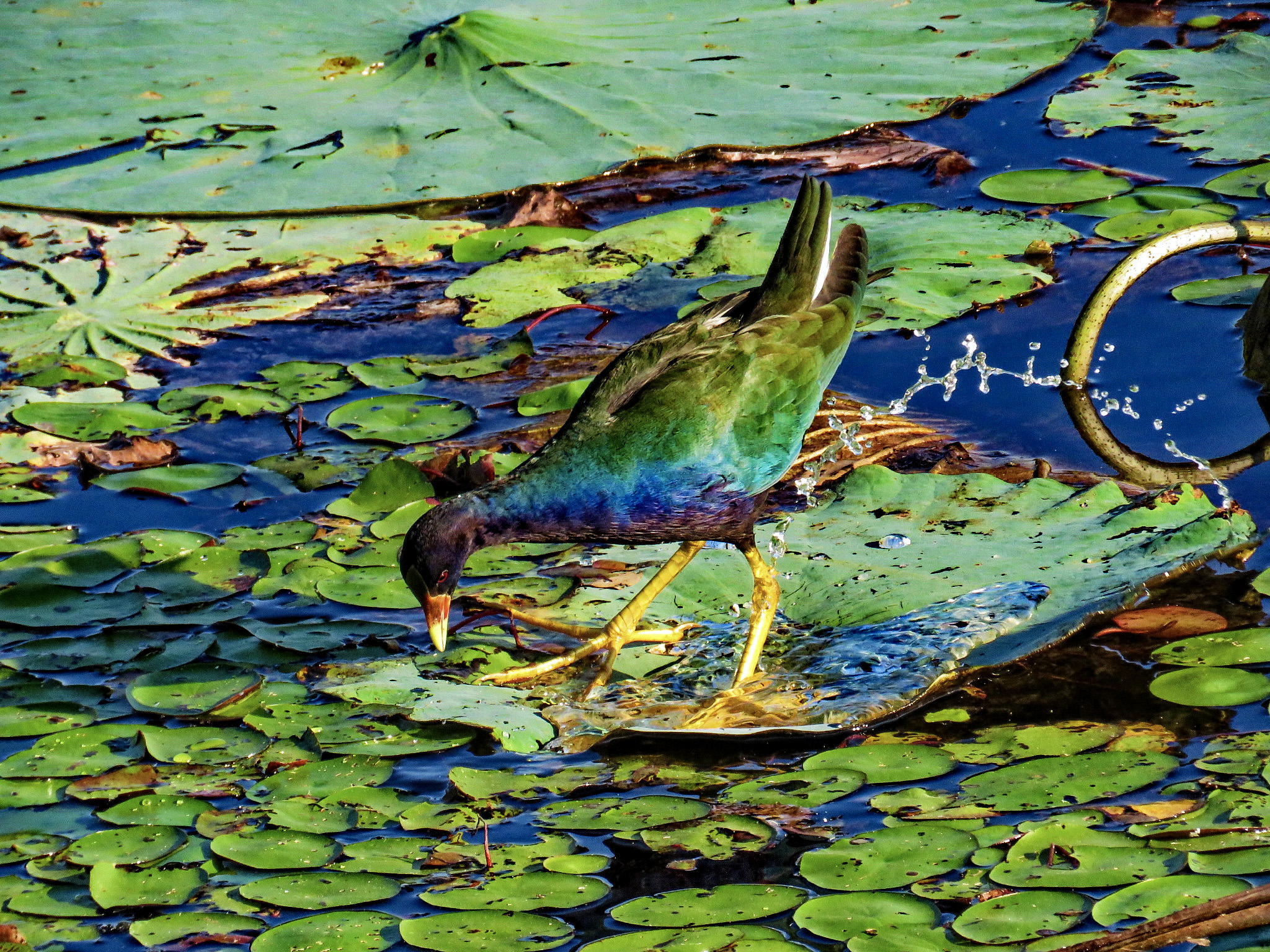
- Website: Sam D. Hamilton Noxubee National Wildlife Refuge

Sam D. Hamilton Noxubee National Wildlife Refuge is a 48,000 acres (190 km^{2}) National Wildlife Refuge located in the U.S. state of Mississippi, in Noxubee, Oktibbeha, and Winston Counties. The refuge serves as a resting and feeding area for migratory birds and as example of proper land stewardship. Also, the refuge extensively manages land for the endangered red-cockaded woodpecker.

== History ==
Land for the Noxubee NWR was obtained in the 1930s through the Resettlement Administration. During the 1930s, the land was controlled by the Bankhead-Jones Farm Tenant Act. In 1940, the land was established as a National Wildlife Refuge to ensure the wetlands would continue to be protected, providing migratory bird species and other animals a safe haven. Of the 48,000 acres (190 km^{2}) of land, approximately 44,500 acres (180 km^{2}) consists of bottomland and upland forest. A variety of species inhabit these lands including quail, deer, and turkey.

Two major lakes, Bluff with 1,200 acres (4.9 km^{2}) and Loakfoma with 600 acres (2.4 km^{2}) provide much of the wetlands within Noxubee. Additionally, there are four green tree reservoirs and sixteen smaller reservoirs which provide a habitat for wood stork, American alligator, bald eagle and other waterfowl.

The refuge partners with nearby Mississippi State University in an extensive research program with the Department of Wildlife and Fisheries and the Department of Forestry.

Originally named the Noxubee National Wildlife Refuge, the refuge was renamed for Sam D. Hamilton, a former director of the Fish and Wildlife Service, in February 2012.

== Attractions ==
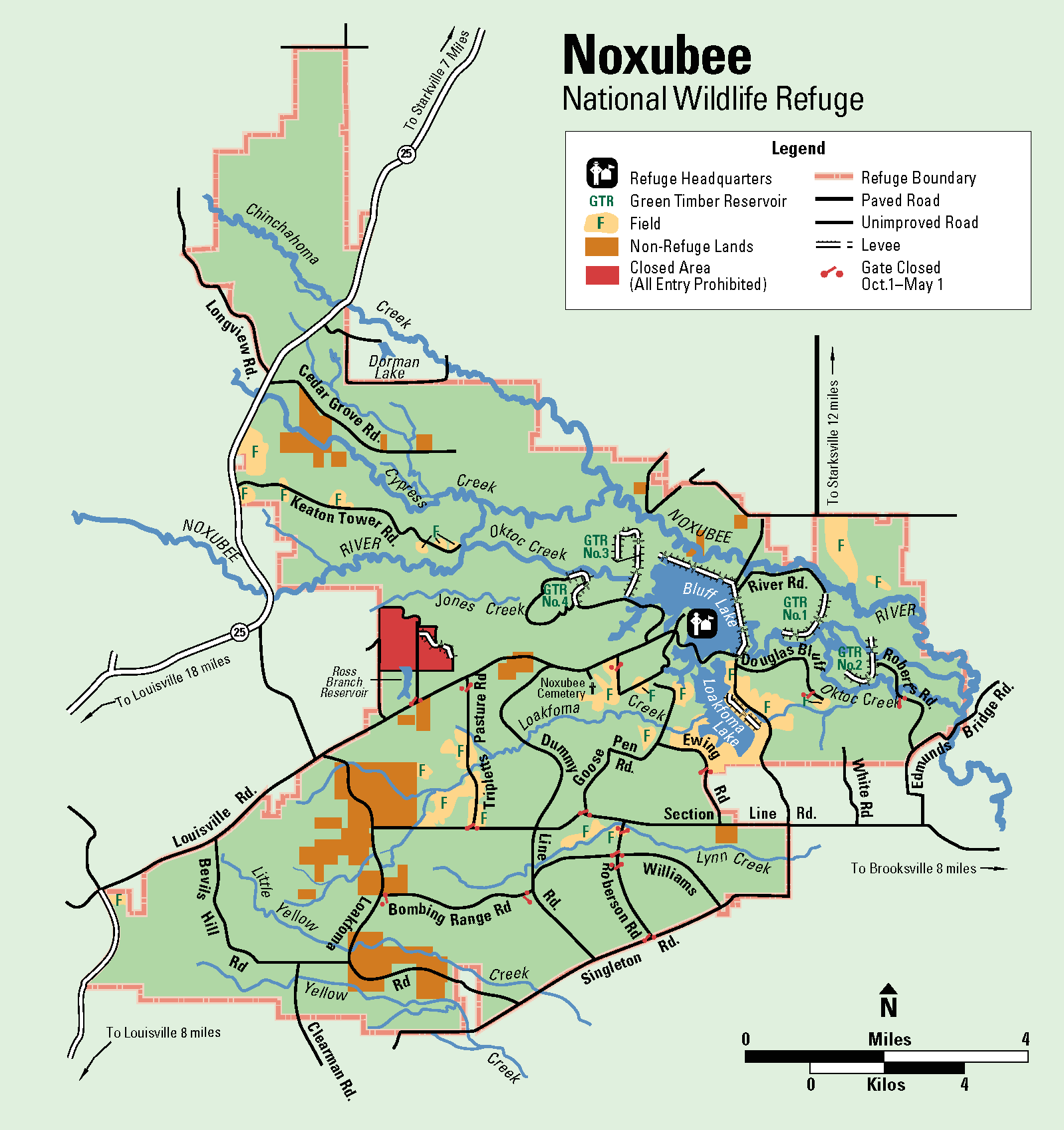
Map of Noxubee NWR

=== Goose Overlook ===
Goose Overlook is a 30-foot-high (9.1 m) observation platform overlooking Bluff Lake. This area provides a wildlife viewing area for animals such as white-tailed deer and migrating Canada Geese.

=== Morgan Hill Overlook ===
Another observation on Morgan Hill provides a view of the 600 acres (2.4 km^{2}) Loakfoma Lake.

=== Bluff Lake Boardwalk ===
This 1,000-foot-long (300 m) boardwalk provides access to an overlook at cypress island on Bluff Lake.

=== Trail networks ===
The refuge has a trail system providing access to wildlife observation points, visit the refuge website for more information on individual hiking trails and boardwalks.

=== Hunting ===
One major attraction of the refuge is hunting, which is allowed throughout the year with differing windows for different species. Licensed hunters can hunt game such as deer, turkey, rabbit, and squirrel.

== See also ==
- List of National Wildlife Refuges
