= John Poindexter (disambiguation) =

John Poindexter (born 1936) is a former U.S. federal government official. Other notable John Poindexters:

- John A. Poindexter (1825–1869), Confederate-American military officer
- John B. Poindexter (born 1944), American soldier and trucking-company founder
- John J. Poindexter (c. 1816–1870), American slave trader and steamboat master
- John Q. Poindexter (1854–1932), American politician of Mississippi
