= Alabama State Route 86 =

State highway in Alabama, United States

State Route 86

Route information
- Maintained by ALDOT
- Length: 27.396 mi (44.090 km)
- Existed: 1957–present

Major junctions
- West end: MS 388 at the Mississippi state line west of Pickensville
- SR 14 in Pickensville; SR 17 in Carrollton
- East end: US 82 in Gordo

Location
- Country: United States
- State: Alabama
- Counties: Pickens

Highway system
- Alabama State Highway System; Interstate; US; State
← SR 85	→ SR 87

State Route 86 (SR 86) is a 27.396-mile-long (44.090 km) state highway completely within Pickens County in the western part of the U.S. state of Alabama. The highway begins at the Mississippi state line and is a continuation of Mississippi Highway 388 (MS 388). The eastern terminus of the highway is at an intersection with U.S. Route 82 (US 82) at Gordo.

== Route description ==
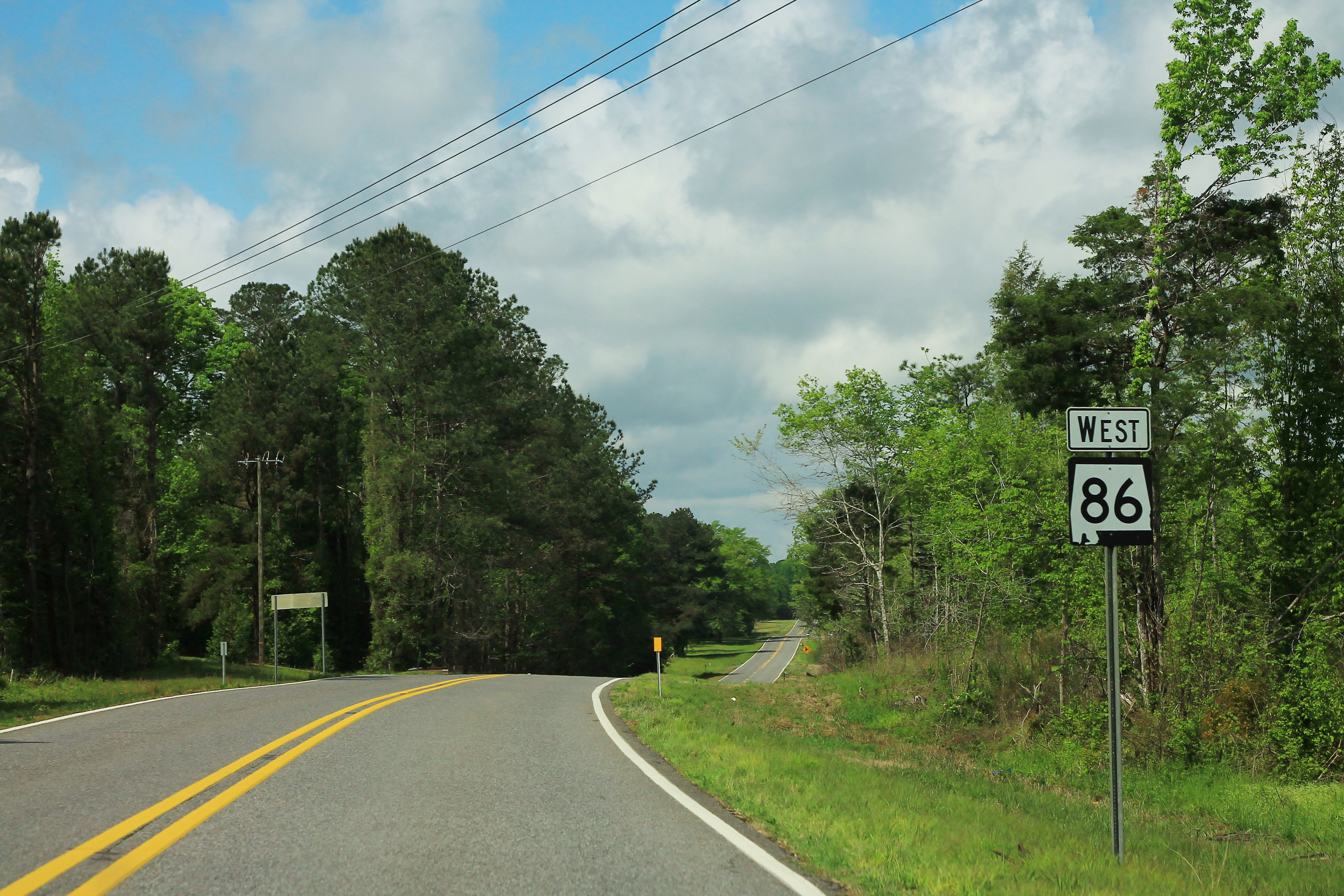
A sign for Alabama State Route 86, west of Carrollton, Alabama.

SR 86 is aligned along a two-lane roadway as it enters Alabama. Just east of the Mississippi state line, the highway crosses the Tom Bevill Lock and Dam and enters the town of Pickensville. The highway travels to the east as it continues across Pickens County, connecting Pickensville with Carrollton and Gordo, where it intersects US 82, which leads eastwardly to Tuscaloosa.

== History ==
SR 86 was designated in 1957. The original route traveled from the Mississippi state line to Carrollton, replacing County Route 70. The highway was extended eastward to its current terminus in 1962, replacing County Route 12.

== Major intersections ==
The entire route is in Pickens County.

Location	mi	km	Destinations	Notes
Pickensville	0.000	0.000	MS 388 west – Brooksville	Mississippi state line; western terminus
Pickensville	2.978	4.793	SR 14 – Tom Bevill Lock and Dam and Visitor Center	
Carrollton	14.113	22.713	SR 17 south (Commerce Street) – Aliceville	Western end of SR 17 concurrency; partial traffic circle around Pickens County Courthouse
Carrollton	14.167	22.800	SR 17 north (Reform Street) – Reform	Eastern end of SR 17 concurrency
	27.396	44.090	US 82 (SR 6) – Gordo, Tuscaloosa	Eastern terminus
1.000 mi = 1.609 km; 1.000 km = 0.621 mi: Concurrency terminus
