= Senator Lucas (disambiguation) =

Scott W. Lucas (1892–1968) was a U.S. Senator from Illinois from 1939 to 1951. Senator Lucas may also refer to:

- David Lucas (American politician) (born 1950), Georgia State Senate
- Frank Lucas (Wyoming politician) (1876–1948), Wyoming State Senate
- Jeanne Hopkins Lucas (1935–2007), North Carolina State Senate
- L. Louise Lucas (born 1944), Virginia State Senate
- Robert Lucas (governor) (1781–1853), Ohio State Senate
- William Brooks Lucas (1891–1970), Mississippi State Senate
