= Noxubee County School District =

School district in Mississippi

Coordinates: 33.104480°N 88.552182°W

The Noxubee County School District is an American public school district based in Macon, Mississippi. The district's boundaries parallel that of Noxubee County.

== Schools ==
- Noxubee County High School (Macon; Grades 9-12)
- B. F. Liddell Middle School (Macon; Grades 5-8)
- Earl Nash Elementary School (Macon; Grades K-4)
- Wilson Elementary School (Brooksville; Grades K-6)

=== Closed Schools ===
- Macon High School (Macon) (Closed)
- Reed Elementary School (Shuqualak; Grades K-6) (Now Closed)

W. B. Reed Elementary School was closed down in the year 2010 due to low enrollment. The elementary school, which was praised for being able to maintain a level 5 ranking for several consecutive years, was combined with Earl Nash Elementary School in Macon, Mississippi. It was reported that the Noxubee County school district was able to save $500,000 after just one year of not operating Reed Elementary. What was once Reed Elementary is now an alternative school for troubled students within the Noxubee County School District.

== Integration ==
The public school population is less than 1% white, compared to 27% of the county population. In 1968, when the federal government mandated integration of public schools, Central Academy was founded in Macon as a segregation academy where white children could attend without having to go to school with black students. In 1982, private deals between board members and the academy to use public funds came to light. The NAACP responded by calling for the resignation of all Noxubee county school board members who had knowledge of the board's aid to the Academy, which at the time still did not enroll any black students.

== Demographics ==
=== 2006-07 school year ===
There were a total of 2,134 students enrolled in the Noxubee County School District during the 2006–2007 school year. The gender makeup of the district was 49% female and 51% male. The racial makeup of the district was 98.83% African American, 0.75% White, 0.28% Hispanic, 0.09% Asian, and 0.05% Native American. All of the district's students were eligible to receive free lunch.

=== Previous school years ===
| School Year | Enrollment | Gender Makeup | | Racial Makeup | | | | |
| School Year | Enrollment | Female | Male | Asian | African American | Hispanic | Native American | White |
|---|---|---|---|---|---|---|---|---|
| 2005-06 | 2,172 | 49% | 51% | – | 98.62% | 0.28% | 0.05% | 1.06% |
| 2004-05 | 2,170 | 50% | 50% | – | 99.59% | 0.14% | – | 0.28% |
| 2003-04 | 2,220 | 50% | 50% | 0.09% | 99.64% | 0.14% | – | 0.14% |
| 2002-03 | 2,259 | 51% | 49% | 0.09% | 99.42% | 0.09% | 0.04% | 0.35% |

== Accountability statistics ==
| | 2006-07 | 2005-06 | 2004-05 | 2003-04 | 2002-03 |
|---|---|---|---|---|---|
| District Accreditation Status | Accredited | Accredited | Accredited | Accredited | Accredited |
School Performance Classifications
| Level 5 (Superior Performing) Schools | 1 | 1 | 1 | 1 | 0 |
| Level 4 (Exemplary) Schools | 0 | 1 | 1 | 1 | 1 |
| Level 3 (Successful) Schools | 2 | 2 | 3 | 2 | 4 |
| Level 2 (Under Performing) Schools | 2 | 1 | 0 | 1 | 0 |
| Level 1 (Low Performing) Schools | 0 | 0 | 0 | 0 | 0 |
| Not Assigned | 0 | 0 | 0 | 0 | 0 |

== See also ==
- List of school districts in Mississippi
