= Reecy Dickson =

American politician (born 1944)

Member of the Mississippi House of Representatives from the 42nd district
- In office January 3, 1993 – January 5, 2016
- Succeeded by: Carl L. Mickens

Personal details
- Born: October 24, 1944 (age 81) Macon, Mississippi, United States

Reecy L. Dickson (born October 24, 1944) is an American Democratic politician. She was a member of the Mississippi House of Representatives from the 42nd District, being first elected in 1992 before losing renomination in 2015.
