= Lorenzo Houston King =

American bishop (1878–1946)

Lorenzo Houston King (2 January 1878 – 17 December 1946) was an American bishop of The Methodist Church, elected in 1940.

He was born in Macon, Mississippi to parents who had once been slaves. He was ordained in 1907 in the Atlanta Annual Conference of the M.E. Church. Prior to his election to the episcopacy, he served as a teacher, pastor, and editor.

He died on 17 December 1946 in New York City.

== See also ==
- List of bishops of the United Methodist Church
