= Larry Anderson (basketball) =

American basketball coach

Larry Anderson is an American basketball coach for the Massachusetts Institute of Technology.

Anderson was born in Macon, Mississippi, one of fourteen full brothers and sisters, in addition to six half brothers and sisters. He attended Noxubee County High School, then East Mississippi Community College in Scooba, Mississippi and Rust College in Holly Springs, Mississippi. After graduating from Rust, he stayed for seven years, initially serving as director of student activities and assistant basketball coach, and later as associate athletic director. In 1995, he became the head coach of the MIT Engineers. He has won more games than any other coach in MIT history. Anderson's 2009 team was the first at MIT to make the NCAA tournament. His teams at MIT have made it to the NCAA Division III national tournament in eight of the last ten years. In 2009, Anderson was inducted into the New England Basketball Hall of Fame.

Anderson is a member of the board of trustees of Rust College.
