= Macon High School (Mississippi) =

- Macon, Noxubee County, Mississippi; United States

Information
- School type: State Secondary School

Macon High School was a public secondary school in Macon, Mississippi. In 1910 the enrollment was approximately 225. There were 5 teachers. In 1915 25% of the school's enrollment came from outside the city limits and paid tuition; in 1916 the school eliminated tuition for these students. In 1917, 170 white children from Macon attended the school, along with more than 60 students from outside the city limits. Younger students from outside the city limits were allowed to attend free, but high school students were required to pay a fee of $3.50 per month. A consolidated school district was proposed to provide a better education for white students than the county's one teacher schools could provide.

== Notable alumni ==
- Willie Daniel NFL defensive back
- Bubba Phillips, Major League baseball player
