= Lynching of Dan Anderson =

1927 murder of a Black man in Mississippi

Coordinates: 33°6′45″N 88°33′40″W

Dan Anderson was an African-American man who was murdered in Macon, Mississippi, on May 20, 1927, at the age of 32. Anderson's father and grandfather had also been lynched.

On May 15, 1927, Anderson was accused of killing T. C. Edwards, a white farmer from Cliftonville, Mississippi. Anderson allegedly ambushed and shot Edwards as he was approaching a tenant house on the property. The rifle used in the shooting was supposedly hidden by one of Anderson's friends, and was found in a chicken coop. Anderson had been a tenant at the Edwards farm preceding the alleged murder. He was arrested in Tuscaloosa, Alabama. A mob of 300 to 500 men overtook Noxubee County sheriff T. B. Adams and took Anderson to the woods, firing more than 200 bullets into his body.
