= Samuel Pandolfo =

American businessman

- Born: November 22, 1874; Macon, Mississippi, U.S.
- Died: January 27, 1960 (aged 85); Fairbanks, Alaska, U.S.
- Occupations: Business, engineering

Samuel Conner Pandolfo (November 22, 1874 – January 27, 1960) was an American businessman most noted for founding the Pan Motor Car Company (1917–1919), and being convicted of fraud in its promotion. Pandolfo raised $9.5 million through stock sales and built an automobile plant in St. Cloud, Minnesota. During the next two years, the plant turned out 737 automobiles and fulfilled numerous U.S. government war contracts. However, he was found guilty of mail fraud and received a three-year prison sentence in the United States Penitentiary, Leavenworth.

The government claimed that Pandolfo defrauded the 70,000 stockholders in his company by sending them misleading information. Others have countered that Pandolfo was done-in not because of his business practices, but because of his beliefs. Pandolfo had the vision to believe that the average person could own shares of stock, and he eagerly sold it to them.

== Early business career ==
In 1899, Pandolfo became the superintendent of schools in Las Cruces, New Mexico Territory. He began selling insurance on the side in 1901, and soon discovered that he "made more money in three months selling insurance than I had made in three years teaching school."

Pandolfo eventually quit his job as superintendent to form the Pandolfo Insurance Company which covered all of Texas, Oklahoma, Arizona, and New Mexico. Pandolfo claimed that he placed nearly $100 million on the books of the companies he represented. He disbanded his company after a crop failure in 1916, and turned his sights to the motorcar business.

== Auto magnate ==
Pandolfo was no stranger to the automobile, having owned 37 of them in his 15 years in the insurance business. He had developed very particular opinions of what constituted a good car: it needed high clearance for the back roads of the day, should have provisions for accommodating the driver overnight if required, and should have the ability to carry extra supplies that might be needed in sparsely populated areas.

Stock certificate for Pan Motorcar Company

Pandolfo incorporated his company in Delaware, and began selling shares of stock for $10. Half of this money went into what Pandolfo called a "surplus fund" and was used to pay stock sales commissions and company expenses. The other half went into the company's capital fund. The stock's par value of $5.00 was clearly printed on each of the stock certificates.

Pandolfo selected St. Cloud, Minnesota, as the site for his plant because of its proximity to iron-ore mines, access to two major transcontinental railroads, access to a deep-water port in Duluth, a well-trained work force that was free of labor union issues, and a ready supply of electrical power.

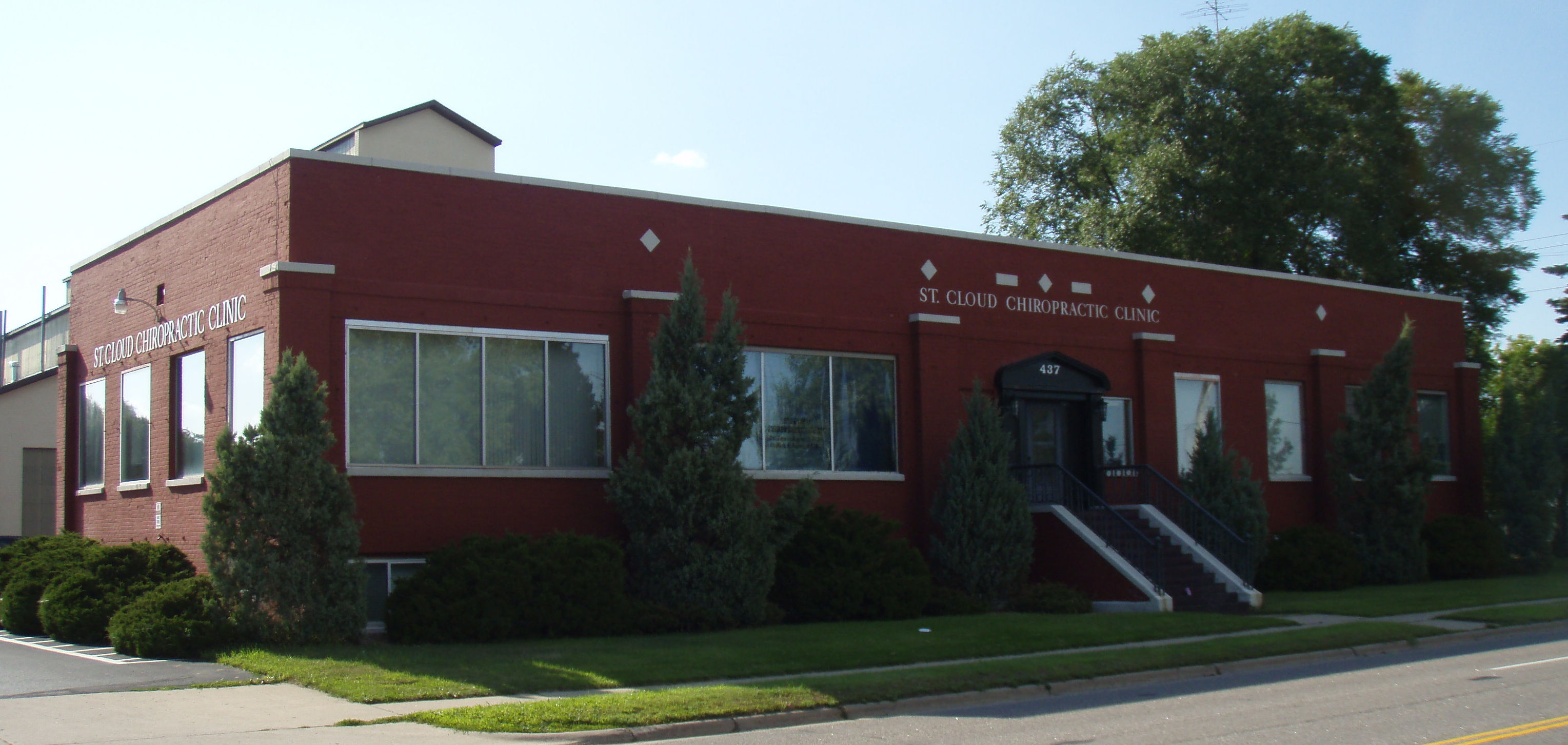
Site of the former Pan Motor Company Office and Sheet Metal Works

The Pan Motor Company's infusion of capital and industry was well-remembered by residents of the time. Pandolfo threw a Fourth of July picnic in 1917 where 15,434 pounds of beef were barbecued for the crowd. Part of the city was dubbed "Pantown" where 58 first-class homes were erected for the company's growing labor force. The company began production of his Pan-Model 250, the first model produced by his new factory that covered 22 acres (8.9 ha) of land, and included the biggest drop-forge plant in the U.S. west of Chicago.

Pandolfo's troubles began when the Associated Advertising Clubs of Minneapolis, a forerunner of the Better Business Bureau, lodged a complaint with the State of Minnesota that Pandolfo was spending more on promotion than its Minnesota Charter permitted. The complaint was dismissed, but on November 16, 1918, a federal grand jury in Fergus Falls, Minnesota, indicted Pandolfo on four counts of "using the mails in furtherance of a scheme to defraud". Pandolfo demanded an immediate trial on the charges, and when the government asked for more time to prepare its case, U.S. Judge Page Morris dismissed the charges.

Despite the dismissal of the case, the matter had slowed the sale of stock, and the Pan Motor Car Company was in need funds to put its premier Pan Model A into full-scale production. Pandolfo went on a whirlwind tour to promote this vehicle, which was his dream car. It had high clearance to negotiate just about any roadway, fold-down seats that transformed into a bed, and contained an ice chest to carry food and other refreshments. A flood of pamphlets and mailings were produced and sent out to promote the vehicle, and it was these promotional materials that ultimately ruined Pandolfo.

== Indictment and conviction ==
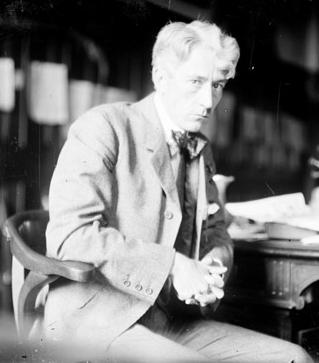
Judge Kenesaw Mountain Landis

On February 1, 1919, a federal grand jury in Chicago indicted Pandolfo, and all officers of the company, with seven counts of mail fraud for sending misleading materials through the federal mails. (Among the charges was that a company flier included a "plane's eye view" of the Pan Motor Car Company that wasn't actually drawn from an airplane.) The case was heard by cantankerous Judge Kenesaw Mountain Landis who made several rulings hostile to Pandolfo. The week the trial took place, the Pan Motor Car Company went into full production of the Pan Model A, and by the end of that month 70 cars had been produced. Nevertheless, the jury was made to believe that the company was a sham, a shell company organized for no other purpose than to sell stock.

Requests by Pandolfo's defense team to show the jury motion pictures of the plant in operation were denied by Judge Landis, who declared, "I have had as much experience with moving pictures as anyone in the past fifteen years, and I am not to be denuded of the opinion I have formed regarding them." The case went to the jury with the jury unaware that the plant was in full-scale production of its second model motorcar, or that the plant had fulfilled numerous U.S. government war contracts, including production of a tank-tread tractor (dubbed "the tractor that will win the war").

Pandolfo was convicted, and mounted an aggressive appeal of his case. The company continued to produce Pan Model A cars in his absence, but publicity of the trial affected public sentiment so greatly that it was impossible to sell additional stock to raise much-needed capital. The Pan Motor Company eventually closed for lack of funds. On April 5, 1923, Samuel Pandolfo surrendered to Chicago authorities, and was taken to Leavenworth Federal Penitentiary, where he served two-and-a-half years of a three-year term.

== Legacy ==
Upon his return to St. Cloud, Minnesota, in October 1926, Pandolfo was greeted by some 600 well-wishers and a band. He summed up the affair with his comment, "You don't meet a crook with a brass band."

As for Judge Landis, he was appointed the first commissioner of baseball in November, 1920, following the "Black Sox Scandal". A commission of several members had originally been proposed, but Landis demanded that he be the sole representative, and that he be given lifetime tenure. He refused to relinquish his federal judgeship even after being censured and threatened with impeachment by the House Judiciary Committee, where the lone dissenting vote against censure was cast by Minnesota Representative Andrew Volstead, who was known for authoring the Volstead Act to enforce Prohibition. Landis resigned from the federal bench in 1922.

Of the 737 Pan cars produced, only 5 are known to exist: three by private owners (two in Minnesota, including one displayed in the Stearns County Museum, and one in New York); one by the Pantowners Car Club in St. Cloud, Minnesota; and one in the Antique Automobile Club of America (AACA) Museum in Hershey, Pennsylvania.

Pandolfo suffered a stroke in December 1959 and died January 27, 1960, in Fairbanks, Alaska.

The Pan Motor Company Office and Sheet Metal Works building on 33rd Avenue North, St. Cloud, Minnesota, still stands, and is listed on the National Register of Historic Places.
