= Chris Jones (wide receiver, born 1982) =

American football player

Profile
- Position: Wide receiver

Personal information
- Born: July 17, 1982 (age 44); Macon, Mississippi, U.S.
- Listed height: 6 ft 3 in (1.91 m)
- Listed weight: 203 lb (92 kg)

Career information
- College: Jackson State
- NFL draft: 2005: undrafted

Career history
- Minnesota Vikings (2005); Seattle Seahawks (2007)*; Kansas City Brigade (2008); Saskatchewan Roughriders (2008–2009)
- * Offseason or practice squad member only
- Stats at CFL.ca (archive)

Christopher Jones (born July 17, 1982) is an American former professional football wide receiver. He was originally an undrafted free agent signed by the Minnesota Vikings after the 2005 NFL draft. He was on the Seahawks' roster in 2006, but did not see any playing time. He was released by the Seahawks on August 28, 2007.

He signed a contract with the Saskatchewan Roughriders on September 24, 2008, and was placed on their Developmental Squad.

Jones graduated from Jackson State University in Jackson, Mississippi, where he was an outstanding wide receiver for the Tigers. While at Jackson State, Jones qualified for the Olympic fencing team, but did not participate due to his commitments to Tiger football.
