= Lawrence Anderson =

Lawrence Anderson may refer to:

- The anglicized version of Laurentius Andreae (c. 1470–1552), Swedish clergyman and scholar
- Lawrence B. Anderson (1906–1994), American architect and educator
- Lawrence Anderson (actor) (1893–1939), British actor, father of Michael Anderson (director)
- Lawrence Anderson (cricketer) (born 1974), New Zealand cricketer
- Lawrence Anderson (pole vaulter), winner of the 1954 NCAA DI outdoor pole vault championship

== See also ==
- Larry Anderson (disambiguation)
