= Bigbee Valley, Mississippi =

Bigbee Valley
- Unincorporated community
- Location within the state of Mississippi
- Coordinates: 33°14′53″N 88°20′59″W
- Country: United States
- State: Mississippi
- County: Noxubee
- Elevation: 157 ft (48 m)
- Time zone: UTC-6 (Central (CST))
  - Summer (DST): UTC-5 (CDT)
- GNIS feature ID: 667158

Bigbee Valley is an unincorporated community in Noxubee County, Mississippi, United States. Variant names are "Bigbeevale", "Nances Mill", and "Whitehall".

Bigbee Valley is located on Mississippi Highway 388, 2.4 mi (3.9 km) west of the Alabama state line. The hamlet was historically located near the west bank of the Tombigbee River. The construction of the Tennessee–Tombigbee Waterway in 1984 moved the navigable portion of the waterway 4.0 mi (6.4 km) east.

The community derives its name from the last two syllables of "Tombigbee", a name of Choctaw origin. A post office was established in 1858.

By 1900, Bigbee Valley had a grist mill, a steam saw mill, cotton gins, and a population of 75.
