= Willie Daniel =

American football player (1937–2015)

No. 44, 46
- Position: Cornerback

Personal information
- Born: November 10, 1937; New Albany, Mississippi, U.S.
- Died: June 29, 2015 (aged 77); Starkville, Mississippi, U.S.
- Listed height: 5 ft 11 in (1.80 m)
- Listed weight: 190 lb (86 kg)

Career information
- High school: Starkville (MS)
- College: Mississippi State
- NFL draft: 1961: undrafted

Career history
- Pittsburgh Steelers (1961–1966); Los Angeles Rams (1967–1969)

Career NFL statistics
- Interceptions: 14
- Fumble recoveries: 3
- Total touchdowns: 2
- Stats at Pro Football Reference

William Paul Daniel (November 10, 1937 – June 29, 2015) was an American professional football defensive back who played nine seasons in the NFL.

== Career ==
Daniel was born in New Albany, Mississippi. He played high school football at Macon High School and in college at Mississippi State. He went undrafted in the 1961 NFL draft but was signed by the Pittsburgh Steelers, where he played for six seasons and made 11 interceptions and one touchdown. In 1967, he was signed to the Los Angeles Rams, playing for three seasons and making three interceptions. In 1969, a knee injury forced him to retire from football.

== Post-football career ==
Following retirement, Daniel returned to Starkville and began an insurance company. In 1970, he opened an athletic club, which led to the formation of the Mississippi Racquetball Association in 1975. He also coached junior football and baseball teams. In 1986, he was elected into the Mississippi State Sports Hall of Fame.

== Personal life and health ==
In 1959, Daniel married Ruth Nash. They had three children. Within the last decade of his life, Daniel suffered from dementia attributed to the numerous concussions he received during his football career. He became a part of a Boston University research project for football head injuries. He donated a portion of his brain and spinal cord for the project in hopes of developing procedures and equipment to make the sport safer for athletes.

Daniel died on June 29, 2015, aged 77. He was diagnosed after death with stage 4 CTE. He was one of at least 345 NFL players to be diagnosed after death with this disease, which is caused by repeated hits to the head.
