= Fest Cotton =

American football player (1949–2012)

- Cotton c. 1971

No. 77
- Position: Defensive tackle

Personal information
- Born: October 18, 1949; Macon, Mississippi
- Died: July 22, 2012 (aged 62); Macon, Mississippi
- Listed height: 6 ft 2 in (1.88 m)
- Listed weight: 255 lb (116 kg)

Career information
- High school: Paul L. Dunbar (OH)
- College: Dayton
- NFL draft: 1972: undrafted

Career history
- Cleveland Browns (1972); Memphis Southmen (1974-1975); New York Giants (1976)*
- * Offseason or practice squad member only
- Stats at Pro Football Reference

Festus James Cotton (October 18, 1949 - July 12, 2012) was an American football defensive tackle.

Cotton was born in Macon, Mississippi in 1949. He attended Paul Laurence Dunbar High School in Dayton, Ohio, and played college football for Dayton from 1969 to 1971.

In 1972, Cotton signed as a free agent with the Cleveland Browns and impressed the coaches during training camp. He noted in August 1972: "I have plenty of incentive. I'm married and have three children." He was a defensive tackle for the Browns during the 1972 season. He also played in the World Football League for the Memphis Southmen in 1974 and 1975. He signed with the New York Giants in 1976, but did not make the final roster.
