= Henry Williams (soldier) =

African American soldier murdered during World War II

- Born: September 15, 1918; Macon, Mississippi, United States
- Died: August 15, 1942 (aged 23); Mobile, Alabama, United States
- Military career
- Allegiance: United States
- Branch: United States Army
- Service years: 1941–1942
- Rank: Private
- Unit: United States Army Air Forces

Henry Williams (September 15, 1918 – August 15, 1942) was an African American Private in the United States Army during World War II. He was killed by a bus driver in Mobile, Alabama on August 15, 1942.

Williams was born on September 15, 1918, in Macon, Mississippi. He enlisted in the Army on September 23, 1941, and was initially stationed at Fort McClellan in Alabama.

At the time of his death, Williams was 23 years old and stationed at Brookley Army Air Field, near Mobile. When the bus driver stopped to talk, Williams asked to continue, citing his need to return to base. This led to an argument, which ended when the bus driver, Grover Chandler, produced a firearm. Williams fled out the back of the bus, but Chandler fired multiple shots, striking Williams in the back of the head.

In reaction to Williams' death, more than 100 people joined the Mobile branch of the NAACP. Local NAACP president John L. LeFlore began a bus boycott and called for prosecution of Chandler. The Mobile Light and Railroad Company agreed to disarm bus drivers, but Chandler only spent a few days in jail. He was charged with murder and released on $3,500 bond, but never prosecuted. The commanding officer at Brookley Field, Colonel Vincent Dixon, stated that the Army could not prosecute a civilian crime off base.

Henry Williams' death was mentioned on episode 3 of the 2007 PBS miniseries The War.
