= Central Academy (Mississippi) =

Defunct segregation academy in Mississippi, US

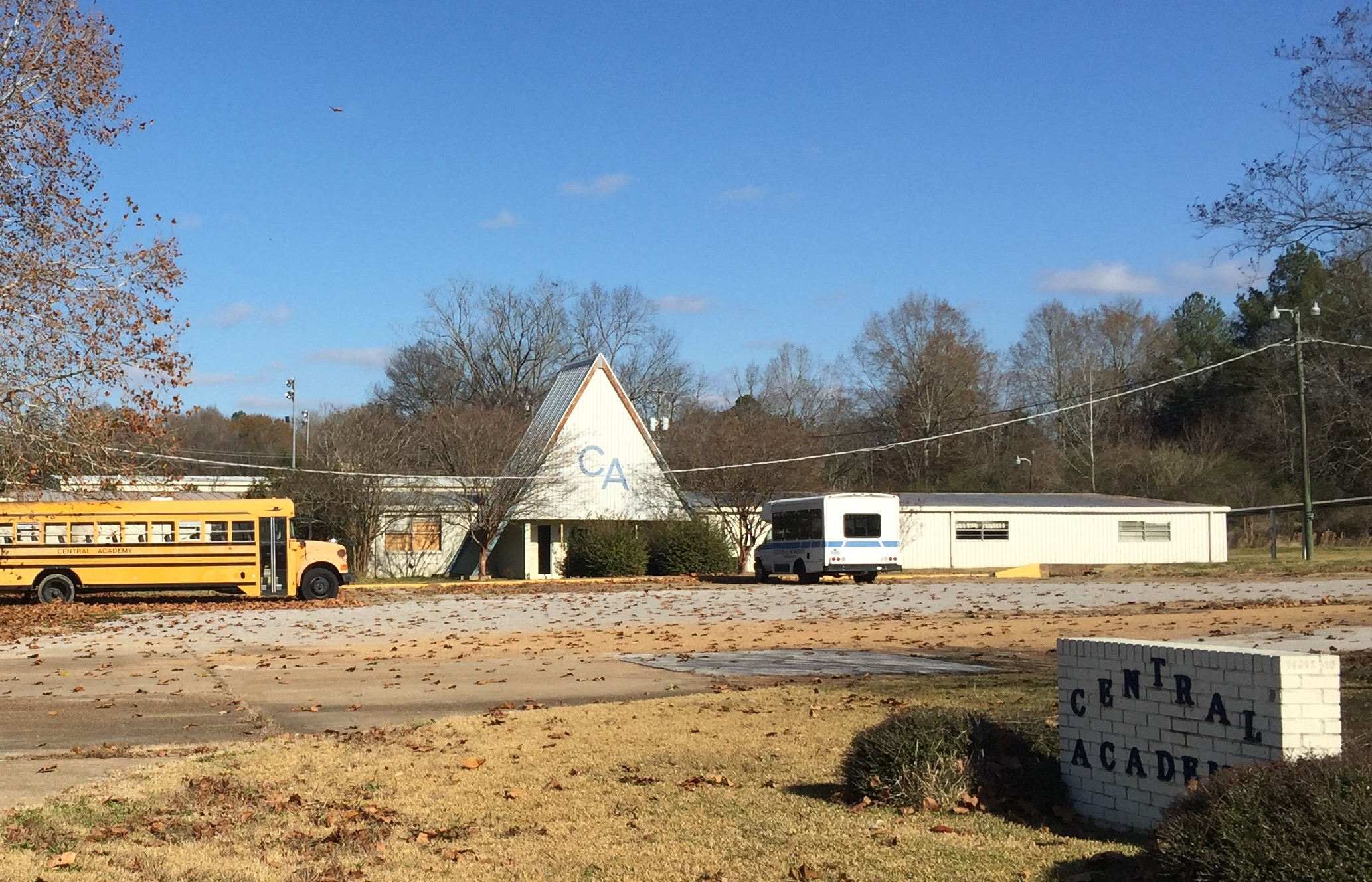

Location
- 300 Hale Street; Macon, Mississippi; 33.114888°N 88.5634412°W

Information
- Type: Private
- Established: 1968
- Closed: 2017
- Headmaster: William Walker
- Teaching staff: 13 (FTE)
- Grades: PK–12
- Enrollment: 82
- Colors: Blue and Gold
- Slogan: Unlocking and expanding God's great gift; the mind
- Nickname: Vikings
- Accreditation: Mississippi Association of Independent Schools (MAIS)
- Website: https://web.archive.org/web/20180105114012/https://caviking.org/

Central Academy (CA) was a private school in Macon, Mississippi, at 300 Hale Street. It was founded in 1968 as a segregation academy. Central closed in 2017, citing dropping enrollments. The population of Noxubee County had dropped in every decade since 1940.

The school used the A Beka curriculum. All staff were certified by the Mississippi Association of Independent Schools.

== History ==
The school was founded in 1968 as an alternative to integrated public schools. White student enrollment in public schools dropped from 829 to 71 during this period. Public School Board funds were secretly used to build the school. When this became public, the NAACP called for the resignation of all board members who had knowledge of this deal. According to the school website, the original buildings at Central Academy were built in 1968 by Arthur Varner at a cost of only $3.00 per square foot, as a result of donated labor. The first headmaster was John Barrett, who resigned as superintendent of Noxubee County Schools in July of the same year. Barrett assured parents they would receive public financial assistance to help pay tuition.

In 1970s, the school's tax exempt status was revoked by the IRS when the school declined to share documentation that it had a racially nondiscriminatory admissions policy. In 1975, the school was involved in a lawsuit due to their refusal to release student transcripts to public schools. In 1978, the school was forced to repay funds they had received illegally, due to their discriminatory admissions policy. By 1982, the school's IRS tax exemption had not been restored, reflecting its policy to exclude non-white students.

In 1982, the NAACP called for the resignation of all Noxubee county school board members who had knowledge of the board's aid to Central Academy, which at the time did not enroll any black students.

== Recent status ==
In the 2015–2016 school year, 63 of 69 students enrolled in grades 1-12 were white, 6 were black (9%). In 2016, Noxubee County was 71% black.

As of 2017, the school maintained a non-discrimination policy on their website and had a small number of minority students in attendance. The school maintained a corporal punishment policy. Boys were not permitted to wear earrings; girls were permitted no piercings other than earrings. School-wide drug tests were permissible, as were random drug tests.

In May 2017, Central Academy had dwindled to 51 students in grades k4–12. The board of directors, known by the name The Noxubee Educational Foundation, unanimously voted to close the school at the end of the school year. The last day of classes were held on May 19, 2017.
