= Macon, Mississippi, race riot =

1919 race riot in Macon, Mississippi, USA

- Part of Red Summer
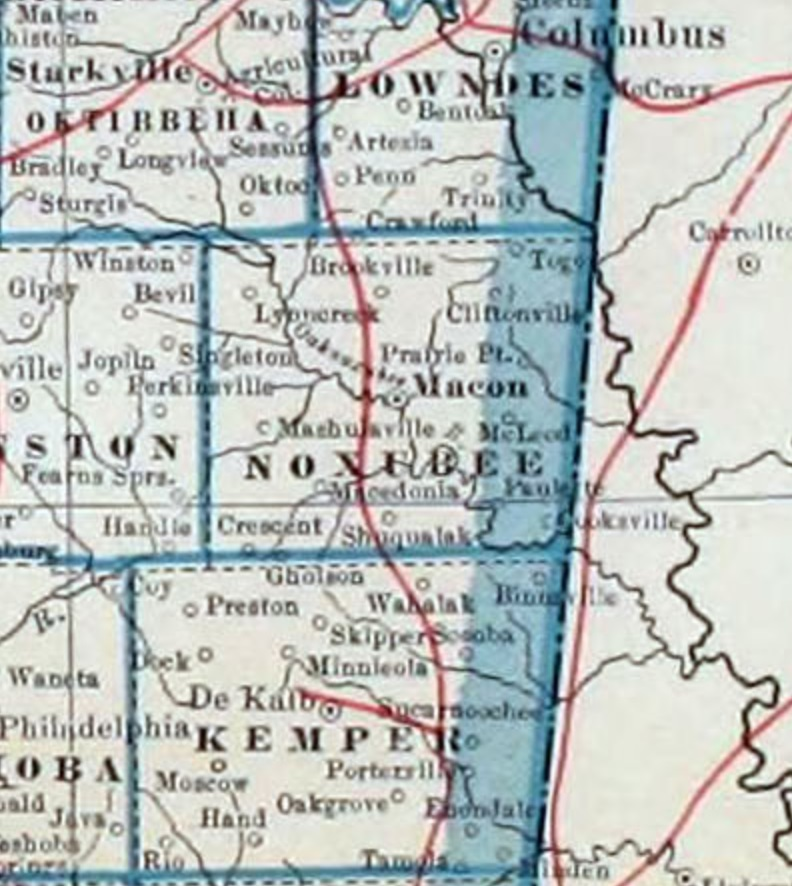
- Topographical and political map of the state of Mississippi around Macon, 1921
- Date: June 7, 1919
- Location: Macon, Mississippi, United States

The Macon, Mississippi, race riot took place on June 7, 1919, in Macon, Mississippi. White members who were angry that black people were organizing to attain better work conditions beat, whipped and then forced them into exile.

== Background ==
Macon has a long history of its white community lynching members of its black community.

== Riot ==
After hearing reports of black workers wanting to get better pay and work conditions a city marshal, a deputy sheriff, and a banker, accompanied by a white mob, attacked and beat several prominent black townspeople, including a school principal. After looting stores, the mob ordered the victims to leave Macon and never return. The News Scimitar reported it as black people being "taken across the river." The Columbus Dispatch reported that white mobs had whipped and beaten the black people who they then forced to leave town.

== Aftermath ==
The Macon race riot was one of many 1919 Red Summer riots and is mentioned in Charles E. Haynes's influential report to Congress on them.

== Bibliography ==
Notes

References

- McWhirter, Cameron (2011). Red Summer: The Summer of 1919 and the Awakening of Black America. Henry Holt and Company. ISBN 9780805089066. - Total pages: 368
- The Columbus Dispatch (June 8, 1919). "Race Trouble At Macon". The Columbus Dispatch. Columbus, Mississippi: Dispatch Print. and Pub. Co. pp. 1–8. ISSN 2576-814X. OCLC 15050737.
- The News Scimitar (June 9, 1919). "Race Trouble Reported in Macon". The News Scimitar. Memphis, Tennessee: Gilbert D. Raine. pp. 1–14. ISSN 2473-3199. OCLC 39898320.
- The New York Times (October 5, 1919). "For Action on Race Riot Peril". The New York Times. New York, NY. ISSN 1553-8095. OCLC 1645522.
