= Deontae Skinner =

American football player (born 1990)

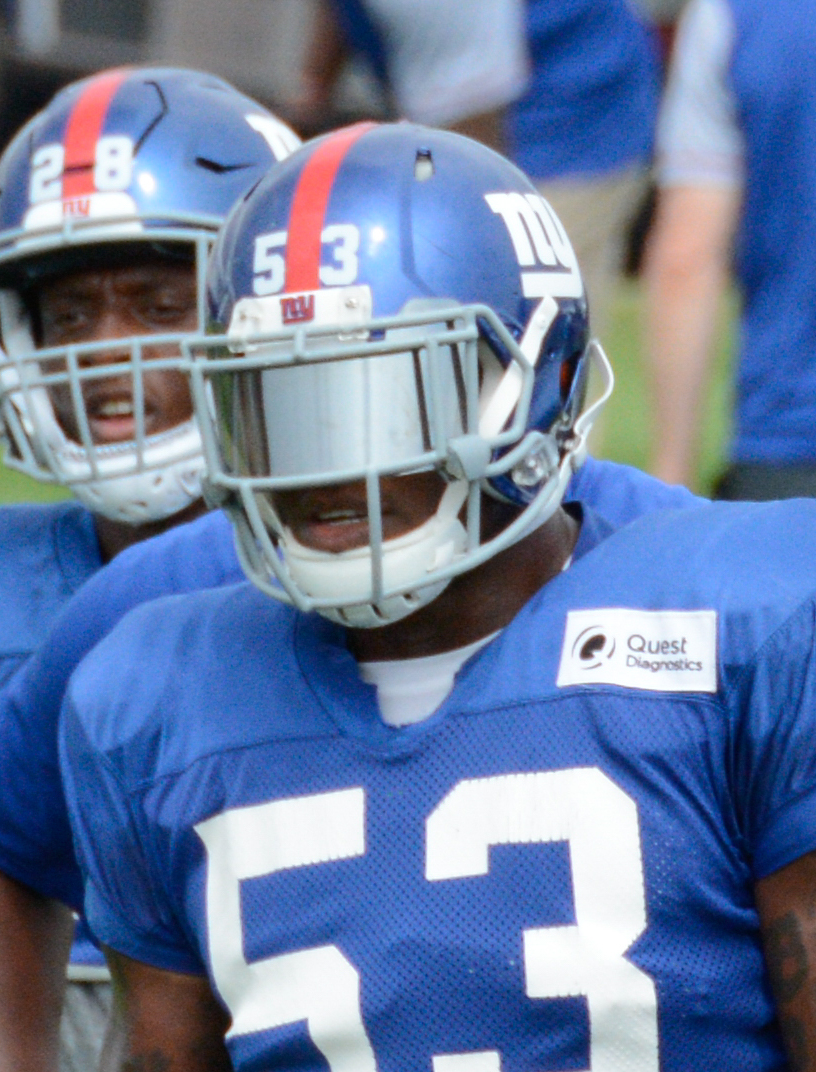
- Skinner with the New York Giants in 2016

No. 55, 53, 45
- Position: Linebacker

Personal information
- Born: December 18, 1990 (age 35); Macon, Mississippi, U.S.
- Listed height: 6 ft 2 in (1.88 m)
- Listed weight: 250 lb (113 kg)

Career information
- High school: Noxubee County (Macon)
- College: Mississippi State
- NFL draft: 2014: undrafted

Career history
- New England Patriots (2014); Philadelphia Eagles (2015–2016)*; New York Giants (2016–2017); Oakland Raiders (2017)*; New York Giants (2017); Tennessee Titans (2018)*; Birmingham Iron (2019)
- * Offseason or practice squad member only

Awards and highlights
- Super Bowl champion (XLIX)

Career NFL statistics
- Total tackles: 23
- Sacks: 1.0
- Stats at Pro Football Reference

Deontae Skinner (born December 18, 1990) is an American former professional football player who was a linebacker for the New England Patriots and New York Giants of the National Football League (NFL). He played college football for the Mississippi State Bulldogs. He was also a member of the Philadelphia Eagles, Oakland Raiders, and Tennessee Titans but did not appear in any games for those teams.

== Early life ==
Skinner played high school football at Noxubee County High School in Macon, Mississippi. He was named first-team All-State for his accomplishments during his senior year, recording 134 tackles, 28 tackles for loss, 11 of which were sacks, and two forced fumbles. Skinner recorded 122 tackles and five sacks his junior year.

== College career ==
Skinner played football for the Mississippi State Bulldogs from 2010 to 2013. He was redshirted for the 2009 season.

== Professional career ==
Pre-draft measurables
Height	Weight	40-yard dash	10-yard split	20-yard split	20-yard shuttle	Three-cone drill	Vertical jump	Broad jump	Bench press
6 ft 1 in (1.85 m)	250 lb (113 kg)	4.81 s	1.69 s	2.77 s	4.42 s	7.18 s	31 in (0.79 m)	9 ft 9 in (2.97 m)	14 reps
All values from Mississippi State Pro Day

=== New England Patriots ===
Skinner was signed by the New England Patriots on May 12, 2014, after going undrafted in the 2014 NFL draft. He was released by the Patriots on August 26, 2014. He was signed to the team's practice squad on September 1, 2014. Skinner was promoted to the active roster on September 13, 2014, and was part of the team that won Super Bowl XLIX over the Seattle Seahawks. He made his NFL debut on September 14, 2014, against the Minnesota Vikings, recording two tackles. Skinner was released by the Patriots on October 29, 2014, and re-signed to the team's practice squad on October 31. He was released by the Patriots on November 26 and re-signed to the team's practice squad on December 3, 2014. He was released by the Patriots on May 5, 2015.

=== Philadelphia Eagles ===
Skinner signed with the Philadelphia Eagles on August 14, 2015. He was released by the Eagles on September 5 and signed to the team's practice squad on September 6, 2015. On August 22, 2016, Skinner was released by the Eagles.

=== New York Giants (first stint) ===
On September 13, 2016, Skinner was signed to the New York Giants' practice squad. He was released on September 17, 2016, and re-signed to the practice squad on September 19. He was promoted to the active roster on October 11, 2016. He was released again on November 19, 2016. He was re-signed to the active roster on December 3, 2016.

On September 2, 2017, Skinner was waived by the Giants. He was re-signed by the Giants on September 28, 2017. He was released again on October 4, 2017.

=== Oakland Raiders ===
On October 10, 2017, Skinner was signed to the Oakland Raiders' practice squad.

=== New York Giants (second stint) ===
On November 7, 2017, Skinner was signed by the Giants off the Raiders' practice squad. He was placed on injured reserve on November 27, 2017. He was waived by the Giants on February 22, 2018.

=== Tennessee Titans ===
On August 21, 2018, Skinner was signed by the Tennessee Titans. He was waived on August 28, 2018.
