= William Ward (poet) =

American Jeweler and Poet

William Ward (August 1823 - 1887) was a jeweler, poet, and editor in Mississippi.

William and Charlotte Ward were his parents. He was a native New Englander born in Litchfield, Connecticut. His father was a jeweler and he had a brother and sister who wrote poetry. He moved to Columbus, Mississippi and worked as a jeweler with his elder brother.

He moved to Macon, Mississippi in 1850. He married Emilie A. Whiffen, a teacher. They had three daughters and a son. She died and he raised them. He became editor of Macon's Beacon newspaper. He was a Whig before becoming a Democrat. He belonged to the Odd Fellows. He was buried in Macon. His poem "Come to the South" beckoned European immigrants. He also wrote of yellow fever and Ku Klux Klan death tolls. His poems were published in the Philadelphia American Courier and New Orleans Times Democrat as well as the Beacon.
