= Macon, Mississippi =

- City
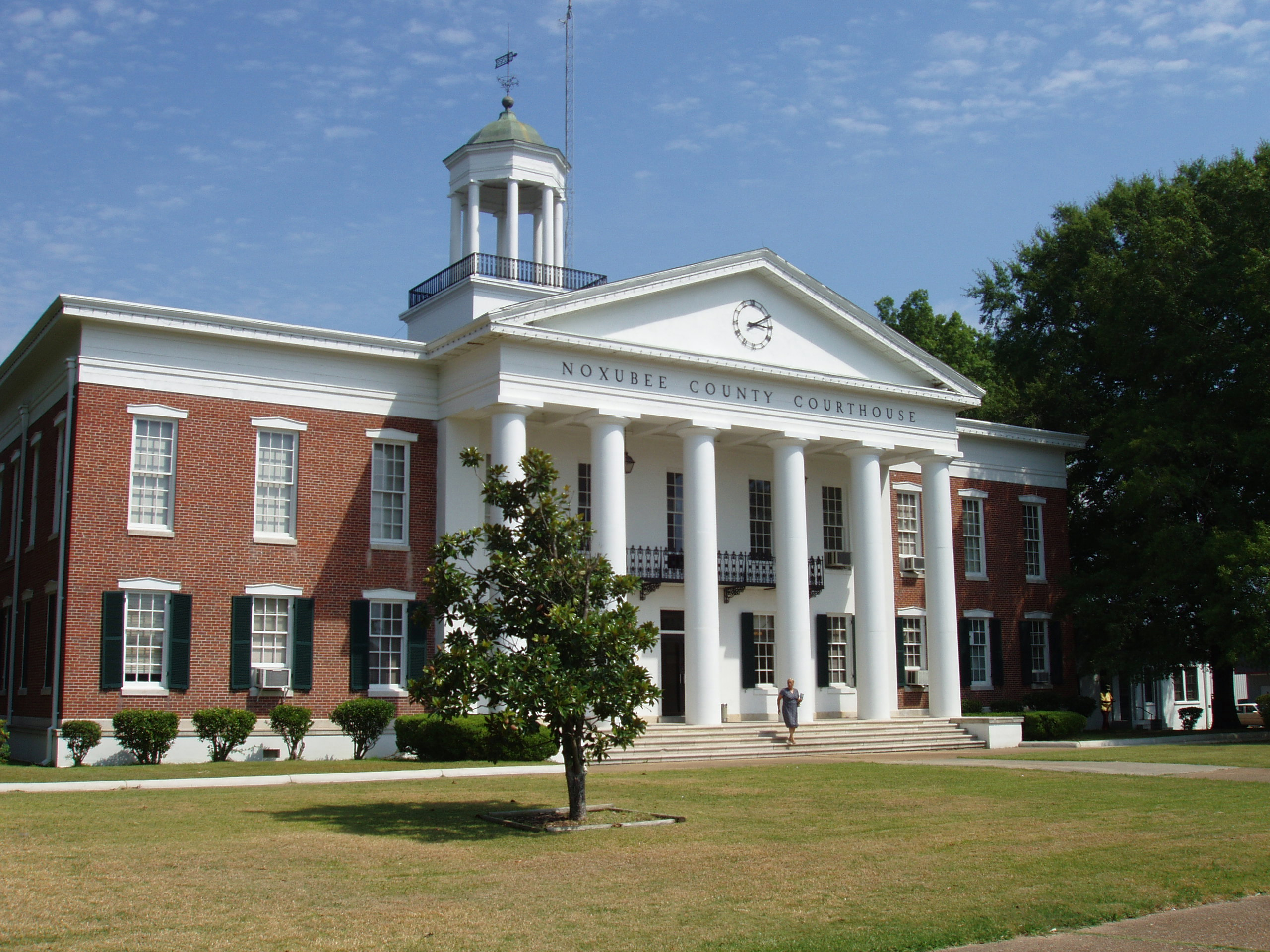
- Noxubee County Courthouse in Macon

- Location of Macon, Mississippi

- Location in the United States
- Coordinates: 33°6′45″N 88°33′40″W
- Country: United States
- State: Mississippi
- County: Noxubee

Area
  - Total: 3.85 sq mi (9.98 km^{2})
  - Land: 3.83 sq mi (9.92 km^{2})
  - Water: 0.023 sq mi (0.06 km^{2})
- Elevation: 200 ft (60 m)

Population (2020)
  - Total: 2,582
  - Density: 674.3/sq mi (260.34/km^{2})
- Time zone: UTC-6 (Central (CST))
  - Summer (DST): UTC-5 (CDT)
- ZIP code: 39341
- Area code: 662
- FIPS code: 28-44240
- GNIS feature ID: 0673046
- Website: www.cityofmacon.org

Macon is a city in and the county seat of Noxubee County, Mississippi along the Noxubee River. As of the 2020 census, Macon had a population of 2,582.

== History ==
In 1817, Jackson's Military Road was built at the urging of Andrew Jackson to provide a direct connection between Nashville and New Orleans. The road crossed the Noxubee River just west of Macon, located at the old Choctaw village of Taladega, now the site of the local golf club. The road declined in importance in the 1840s, largely due to the difficulty of travel in the swamps surrounding the Noxubee River in and west of Macon.

The route for the most part was replaced by the Robinson Road, which ran through Agency and Louisville before joining the Natchez Trace, bypassing Macon.

On September 15, 1830, US government officials met with an audience of 6,000 Choctaw men, women and children at Dancing Rabbit Creek to explain the policy of removal through interpreters. The Choctaws faced migration west of the Mississippi River or submitting to U.S. and state law as citizens.

The treaty would sign away the remaining traditional homeland to the United States; however, a provision in the treaty made removal more acceptable.

The town was named Macon on August 10, 1835, in honor of Nathaniel Macon, a statesman from North Carolina.

By August 1856, the Mobile and Ohio Railroad had built a line through Macon. A stop at Macon had been built by 1874.

The city served as the capital for the state of Mississippi during the Civil War from 1863 onward.

The legislature was housed in the Calhoun Institute, which also housed Governor Charles Clark's office and served as one of several hospital sites in Macon.

In October 1865, Governor Benjamin Humphreys attempted to retrieve the furniture from the governor's mansion to Jackson, however it had been either destroyed or stolen.

On June 27, 1919, in an incident described as part of the Red Summer, a mob of white citizens including a banker and a deputy sheriff, among many others, attacked prominent black citizens. On May 20, 1927, Dan Anderson was lynched in Macon.

== Geography ==
According to the United States Census Bureau, the city has a total area of 1.5 square miles (3.9 km^{2}), all land.

=== Climate ===
Macon has a humid subtropical climate (Köppen Cfa) with long, hot summers and short, mild winters.

Climate data for Macon, Mississippi (1991–2020 normals, extremes 1894–present)
Month	Jan	Feb	Mar	Apr	May	Jun	Jul	Aug	Sep	Oct	Nov	Dec	Year
Record high °F (°C)	90 (32)	90 (32)	96 (36)	94 (34)	100 (38)	106 (41)	109 (43)	111 (44)	106 (41)	101 (38)	91 (33)	86 (30)	111 (44)
Mean maximum °F (°C)	73.4 (23.0)	77.0 (25.0)	83.0 (28.3)	86.2 (30.1)	91.1 (32.8)	94.8 (34.9)	96.9 (36.1)	97.5 (36.4)	94.2 (34.6)	88.6 (31.4)	80.0 (26.7)	74.7 (23.7)	98.9 (37.2)
Mean daily maximum °F (°C)	54.1 (12.3)	58.7 (14.8)	66.4 (19.1)	74.5 (23.6)	82.0 (27.8)	87.8 (31.0)	90.3 (32.4)	90.5 (32.5)	85.7 (29.8)	76.3 (24.6)	64.9 (18.3)	56.5 (13.6)	74.0 (23.3)
Daily mean °F (°C)	43.4 (6.3)	47.1 (8.4)	54.5 (12.5)	62.2 (16.8)	70.8 (21.6)	77.7 (25.4)	80.3 (26.8)	80.1 (26.7)	74.4 (23.6)	63.5 (17.5)	52.6 (11.4)	45.5 (7.5)	62.7 (17.1)
Mean daily minimum °F (°C)	32.7 (0.4)	35.4 (1.9)	42.6 (5.9)	49.8 (9.9)	59.6 (15.3)	67.6 (19.8)	70.3 (21.3)	69.7 (20.9)	63.0 (17.2)	50.8 (10.4)	40.3 (4.6)	34.4 (1.3)	51.3 (10.7)
Mean minimum °F (°C)	16.2 (−8.8)	21.3 (−5.9)	26.8 (−2.9)	35.1 (1.7)	45.2 (7.3)	57.7 (14.3)	64.1 (17.8)	62.1 (16.7)	49.4 (9.7)	35.1 (1.7)	25.9 (−3.4)	20.9 (−6.2)	14.1 (−9.9)
Record low °F (°C)	−11 (−24)	−5 (−21)	13 (−11)	28 (−2)	37 (3)	45 (7)	53 (12)	49 (9)	34 (1)	23 (−5)	12 (−11)	0 (−18)	−11 (−24)
Average precipitation inches (mm)	5.53 (140)	5.62 (143)	5.12 (130)	5.79 (147)	3.90 (99)	4.50 (114)	4.79 (122)	4.18 (106)	3.98 (101)	3.88 (99)	4.40 (112)	5.48 (139)	57.17 (1,452)
Average snowfall inches (cm)	0.3 (0.76)	0.1 (0.25)	0.0 (0.0)	0.0 (0.0)	0.0 (0.0)	0.0 (0.0)	0.0 (0.0)	0.0 (0.0)	0.0 (0.0)	0.0 (0.0)	0.0 (0.0)	0.0 (0.0)	0.4 (1.0)
Average precipitation days (≥ 0.01 in)	9.6	8.5	9.0	7.6	7.9	8.3	9.5	8.3	5.5	5.6	7.1	8.9	95.8
Average snowy days (≥ 0.1 in)	0.1	0.1	0.0	0.0	0.0	0.0	0.0	0.0	0.0	0.0	0.0	0.0	0.2
Source: NOAA

== Demographics ==
In 2016, Macon was the poorest town in the United States with a population between 1,000 and 25,000 people.

Historical population
Census	Pop.	Note	%±
1860	989		—
1870	975		−1.4%
1880	2,074		112.7%
1890	1,565		−24.5%
1900	2,067		32.1%
1910	2,024		−2.1%
1920	2,051		1.3%
1930	2,198		7.2%
1940	2,261		2.9%
1950	2,241		−0.9%
1960	2,432		8.5%
1970	2,612		7.4%
1980	2,396		−8.3%
1990	2,256		−5.8%
2000	2,461		9.1%
2010	2,768		12.5%
2020	2,582		−6.7%
U.S. Decennial Census

=== Racial and ethnic composition ===
Macon, Mississippi – Racial and ethnic composition Note: the US Census treats Hispanic/Latino as an ethnic category. This table excludes Latinos from the racial categories and assigns them to a separate category. Hispanics/Latinos may be of any race.
Race / Ethnicity (NH = Non-Hispanic)	Pop 2000	Pop 2010	Pop 2020	% 20010	% 2010	% 2020
White alone (NH)	770	600	383	31.29%	21.68%	14.83%
Black or African American alone (NH)	1,654	2,131	2,088	67.21%	76.99%	80.87%
Native American or Alaska Native alone (NH)	5	3	3	0.20%	0.11%	0.12%
Asian alone (NH)	9	13	0	0.37%	0.47%	0.00%
Pacific Islander alone (NH)	0	0	0	0.00%	0.00%	0.00%
Other Race alone (NH)	1	1	3	0.04%	0.04%	0.12%
Mixed Race or Multiracial (NH)	12	7	56	0.49%	0.25%	2.17%
Hispanic or Latino (any race)	10	13	49	0.41%	0.47%	1.90%
Total	2,461	2,768	2,582	100.00%	100.00%	100.00%

=== 2020 census ===
As of the 2020 census, Macon had a population of 2,582. The median age was 35.9 years. 27.8% of residents were under the age of 18 and 15.6% of residents were 65 years of age or older. For every 100 females there were 81.4 males, and for every 100 females age 18 and over there were 72.3 males age 18 and over.

0.0% of residents lived in urban areas, while 100.0% lived in rural areas.

There were 1,022 households in Macon, of which 33.9% had children under the age of 18 living in them. Of all households, 23.0% were married-couple households, 20.5% were households with a male householder and no spouse or partner present, and 52.0% were households with a female householder and no spouse or partner present. About 35.5% of all households were made up of individuals and 12.7% had someone living alone who was 65 years of age or older.

There were 1,159 housing units, of which 11.8% were vacant. The homeowner vacancy rate was 2.4% and the rental vacancy rate was 7.3%.

=== 2000 census ===
As of the census of 2000, there were 2,461 people, 906 households, and 587 families residing in the city. The population density was 1,624.8 inhabitants per square mile (627.3/km^{2}). There were 1,015 housing units at an average density of 670.1 per square mile (258.7/km^{2}). The racial makeup of the city was 31.49% White, 67.33% African American, 0.20% Native American, 0.41% Asian, 0.08% from other races, and 0.49% from two or more races. Hispanic or Latino of any race were 0.41% of the population.

There were 906 households, out of which 32.6% had children under the age of 18 living with them, 34.0% were married couples living together, 27.5% had a female householder with no husband present, and 35.1% were non-families. 33.1% of all households were made up of individuals, and 16.3% had someone living alone who was 65 years of age or older. The average household size was 2.53 and the average family size was 3.25.

In the city, the population was spread out, with 28.9% under the age of 18, 10.3% from 18 to 24, 27.8% from 25 to 44, 16.2% from 45 to 64, and 16.8% who were 65 years of age or older. The median age was 33 years. For every 100 females, there were 82.6 males. For every 100 females age 18 and over, there were 80.5 males.

The median income for a household in the city was $20,800, and the median income for a family was $26,696. Males had a median income of $22,969 versus $16,898 for females. The per capita income for the city was $12,568. About 29.2% of families and 36.0% of the population were below the poverty line, including 50.3% of those under age 18 and 21.8% of those age 65 or over.

== Arts and culture ==
The Noxubee County library is located in Macon. The building, which was constructed as a jail in 1907, still contains a gallows.

== Education ==
Historically, the city of Macon had the largest schools in Noxubee County, including Macon High School (Mississippi). In 1917, the city proposed consolidation of the school district with Noxubee County, with the goal of replacing the single-teacher system prevalent throughout the county.

The City of Macon is now served by the Noxubee County School District. East Mississippi Community College offers some courses at Noxubee County High School in Macon.

When federal courts mandated integration of the public schools, a segregation academy, Central Academy, was built in Macon, secretly using public school funds to construct the private school. White student enrollment in public schools dropped from 829 to 71 during this period. Attendance at Central Academy eventually dwindled to 51 students, resulting in the shuttering of the school following the 2017 school year.

== Media ==
The first newspaper in Macon was the Macon Intelligencer, which operated from 1838 to 1840. Another paper, the Macon Herald ran from 1841 to 1842. The Macon Beacon was established in 1849. It served Macon as a daily from 1859 to 1995. It continues to operate as a weekly, published on Thursdays.

== Notable people ==
- Chapman L. Anderson, member of the United States House of Representatives from 1887 to 1891
- Larry Anderson, basketball coach for MIT
- Buster Barnett, former NFL player for the Buffalo Bills
- Carey Bell, blues harmonicist
- McArthur Binion, artist
- Cornelius Cash, basketball player
- Eddy Clearwater, blues guitarist and singer, born Edward Harrington in Macon in 1935. Cousin of Harmonicist Carey Bell.
- Quincy Coleman, former NFL and CFL player
- Darion Conner, former professional football player with the Atlanta Falcons convicted of vehicular homicide
- Fest Cotton, former NFL defensive tackle
- Joseph Crespino, historian
- Albert Tatum Dent, member of the Mississippi Senate from 1902 to 1908 and 1924 to 1928
- Reecy Dickson, member of the Mississippi House of Representatives from 1993 to 2016
- Henry Minor Faser, founding dean of the University of Mississippi School of Pharmacy
- Hezekiah William Foote, planter and former member of the Mississippi House of Representatives and Mississippi Senate. Father of Huger Lee Foote.
- Huger Lee Foote, planter and former member of the Mississippi Senate. Grandfather of Shelby Foote.
- Jesse Fortune, blues singer
- Victoria Clay Haley, suffragist
- Reggie Holmes, former CFL player
- Nate Hughes, former professional football player with the Jacksonville Jaguars and Detroit Lions
- T. R. Hummer, poet
- Chris Jones, former NFL and CFL wide receiver
- Lorenzo Houston King, bishop of the Methodist Church (USA)
- William Manly King, architect
- Clarke Lewis, member of the United States House of Representatives from 1889 to 1893
- William Brooks Lucas, former member of the Mississippi Senate
- Brother Joe May, gospel singer
- Andy P. Mullins, educator
- Samuel Pandolfo, businessman
- Bubba Phillips, Major League Baseball player
- John Alton Phillips, member of the Mississippi House of Representatives from 1932 to 1940 and 1944 to 1965
- John Q. Poindexter, member of the Mississippi Senate from 1916 to 1920
- America W. Robinson, African American educator; contralto (Fisk Jubilee Singers)
- Gene Short, former National Basketball Association player
- Jeffery Simmons, defensive end for the Chicago Bears
- Deontae Skinner, NFL player
- Isham Stewart, former member of the Mississippi House of Representatives and the Mississippi Senate
- William Ward, poet and editor of the Macon Beacon.
- Margaret Murray Washington, educator; wife of Booker T. Washington
- Nate Wayne, former NFL football player with Green Bay Packers, Denver Broncos, and Philadelphia Eagles
- Israel Victor Welch, Confederate politician and lawyer lived in Macon after the war
- Sherman W. White, fighter pilot with the Tuskegee Airmen
- Ben Ames Williams, novelist
- Big Joe Williams, Delta blues guitarist and songwriter
- Henry Williams, soldier who was murdered by a bus driver in 1942
