= Noxubee County High School =

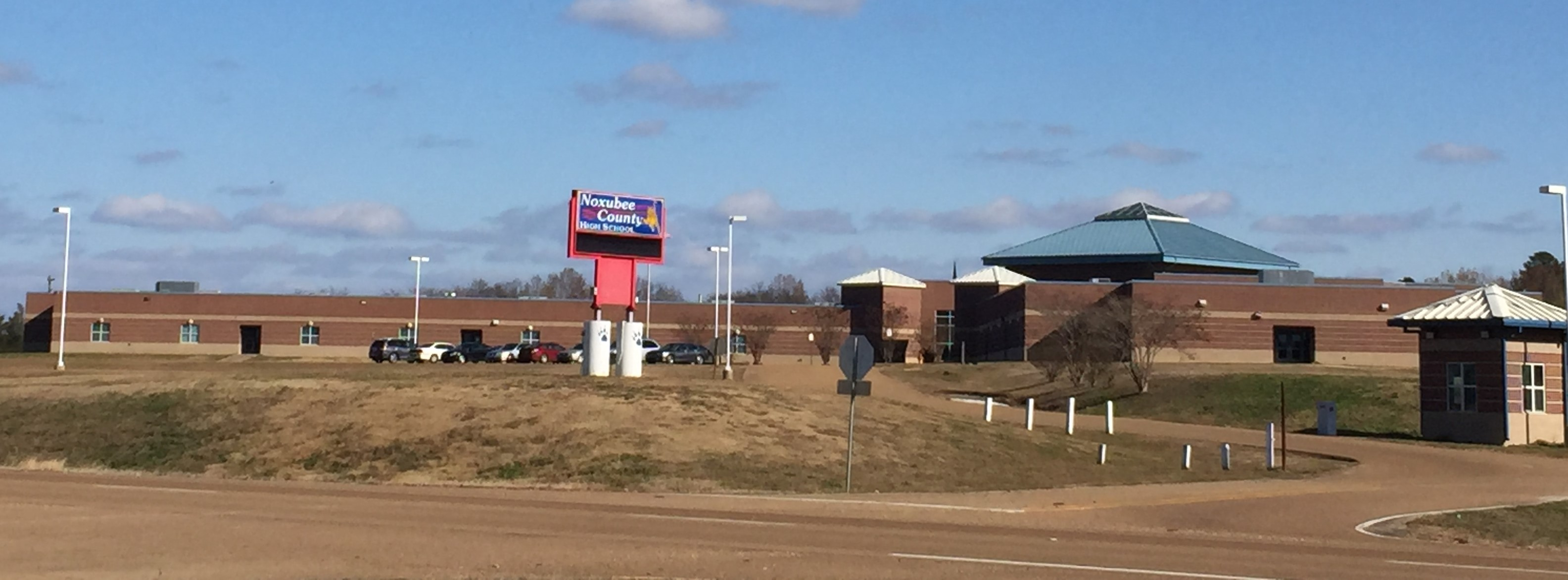

Location
- 16478 Highway 45 North; Macon, Mississippi; United States; 33.1600°N 88.5568°W

Information
- Type: Public
- School district: Noxubee County School District
- Principal: Aiesha Brooks
- Teaching staff: 33.40 (on an FTE basis)
- Grades: 9–12
- Enrollment: 421 (2023-2024)
- Student to teacher ratio: 12.60
- Color
- Mascot: Tiger
- Website: www.ourncsd.org/nchs/

Noxubee County High School is the only public secondary school in Noxubee County, Mississippi. It is located at 16478 Hwy 45 in Macon, Mississippi. Its attendance boundary is all of Noxubee County.

== Athletics ==
The Noxubee County High School football and basketball teams compete in District 4A. Their mascot is the tiger. The football team won the 2009 and 2012 State Championships. They repeated as champions in 2014 and 2015. The Noxubee High School Tigers girls basketball team won back-to-back state titles in 1993-94.

== Demographics ==
As of the 2023-2024 school year, there were 421 students, 411 of whom were black, seven of whom were Hispanic, two of whom were white and one of whom was native Hawaii/Pacific Islander. Of these, all 421 were eligible for free lunch. 215 students were male, 206 were female.

== Notable alumni ==
- Buster Barnett (born 1958), National Football League (NFL) tight end
- Darion Conner (born 1967), NFL linebacker convicted of vehicular homicide
- Omarr Conner (born 1984), Mississippi State Bulldogs American football quarterback
- Vincent Dancy (born 1984), college football coach
- Freddie Joe Nunn (1962–2021), NFL defensive end and linebacker
- Jeffery Simmons (born 1997), NFL defensive tackle
- Deontae Skinner (born 1990), NFL linebacker
- Kamario Taylor (born 2007), Mississippi State Bulldogs American football quarterback
