= JTR =

JTR may refer to:

- JTR (band), a Swedish boy band
- JTR (song), by Dave Matthews Band
- Joe Tandy Racing, a Formula Three team
- Santorini (Thira) National Airport's IATA code in Greece
