= John Q. Poindexter =

American politician

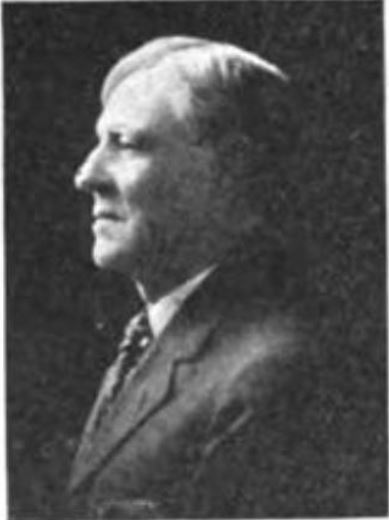
- c. 1917

Member of the Mississippi Senate from the 16th district
- In office January 1916 – January 1920

Personal details
- Born: March 10, 1854 Gainesville, Alabama
- Died: September 17, 1932 (aged 78) Macon, Mississippi
- Party: Democrat

John Quarles Poindexter (March 10, 1854 – September 17, 1932) was a Democratic member of the Mississippi State Senate, representing the 16th district, from 1916 to 1920.

== Biography ==
John Quarles Poindexter was born on March 10, 1854, in Gainesville, Alabama. He was the son of William Rice Poindexter and Martha Jane (Barrett) Poindexter. After the death of his father in 1870, John attended Reagan High School in Morristown, Tennessee. He became a planter and merchant. He became a member of the Mississippi State Senate in 1916, representing the 16th district as a Democrat. He served from 1916 to 1920. He died at his home in Macon after a long illness on September 17, 1932. He was survived by his widow and four children.

== Personal life ==
He was a Presbyterian. He married Lucinda George Richards in 1878. They had four children, all of whom survived John.
