= Larry J. Anderson =

American virologist

Larry J. Anderson (born July 29, 1947) is an American virologist who served in leadership positions at the Centers for Disease Control and Prevention (CDC) for more than three decades. He was director of the Division of Viral Diseases in the National Center for Immunization and Respiratory Diseases at the CDC (2006–2010), and chief of the Respiratory and Enteric Viruses Branch of the CDC Division of Viral and Rickettsial Diseases (1982–2006). From 2003 to 2006, Anderson led the CDC’s Post-Outbreak SARS Program, and he served as a special advisor on smallpox in the Office of the Associate Director for Terrorism, Preparedness, and Response.

He is now professor and Marcus Chair of Infectious Diseases and co-director of the Pediatric Infectious Diseases Division of the Emory University School of Medicine, and a virologist in the Vaccine and Treatment Evaluation Unit of Emory Clinical Trials.

Anderson’s current vaccine-development research is focused on the immunopathogensis of respiratory viral infections, especially Respiratory Syncytial Virus (RSV), an important cause of morbidity and mortality in young children and the elderly globally. His laboratory, which collaborates with the Asthma Research Center at the Vanderbilt University Medical Center, is also studying the asthmatic immune response to RSV to identify novel approaches to treatment.

== Publications ==
He is the co-author of more than 250 articles in peer-reviewed publications, the co-editor of five books, and the co-author of nearly 70 review articles and book chapters. His awards include the CDC Lifetime Scientific Achievement Award, the William C. Watson Medal of Excellence, and the Charles C. Shepard Science Award.

== Education ==
Anderson graduated from St. Olaf College and Harvard Medical School, and he received post-graduate training at Harbor General Hospital in Torrance, CA, the CDC in Atlanta, Beth Israel Hospital in Boston, and the Weatherall Institute of Molecular Medicine at John Radcliffe Hospital at Oxford University in England.
