= Bill Lucas (academic) =

English social entrepreneur and author

- Born: 1956 (age 69–70)
- Occupations: Social entrepreneur, author, academic, researcher and speaker
- Awards: Fellow of the Royal Society of Arts; Guardian Jerwood Award for outstanding leadership in voluntary sector Fellow of International Specialized Skills Institute

Academic background
- Education: Trinity College, Oxford; De Montfort University

Bill Lucas (born 1956) is a social entrepreneur and author. He is a professor of Learning and Director of the Centre for Real-World Learning at the University of Winchester. He is the co-creator of Expansive Education Network and a founding partner of a Bill Lucas Partnership Ltd. He is also an international adviser to Victorian Curriculum and Assessment Authority in Australia and to the OECD/CERI on creativity.

In 2011 his book, rEvolution: how to thrive in crazy times won a CMI Management Book of the Year award. In 2014 he was awarded an international fellowship by the International Specialized Skills Institute of Australia in recognition of his work in vocational education. His framing of engineering as a number of engineering habits of mind was selected as one of the big ideas of the decade in engineering education by the Institution of Mechanical Engineers in 2016. Educating Ruby was selected for a special Open Dialogue edition of The Psychology of Education Review by The British Psychological Society in 2016.

== Education ==
Lucas received his Honors Degree in English Language and Literature from Trinity College, Oxford, in 1978 and his Post-Graduate Certificate of Education from Oxford University in 1980. He has an Ed.D. (Hon) from De Montfort University (2001).

== Career ==
After receiving his Post-Graduate Certificate of Education and a number of years teaching, Lucas was appointed as deputy headteacher of Longford School in London from 1988 till 1990. For the next seven years, Lucas served as a chief executive of Learning through Landscapes. In 1997, he founded the Campaign for Learning and was its chief executive till 2002. In the same year, he became the founding partner of Bill Lucas Partnership Ltd.

In 2008, Lucas was appointed as a professor at the University of Winchester where he co-founded the Centre for Real-World Learning and serves as its director. Apart from entrepreneurial and academic positions, Lucas holds advisory and administrative positions advising OECD and PISA, chairing Eton's Tony Little Centre for Research and Innovation in Learning's advisory board and leading fellowship learning for the THIS Institute at Cambridge University. Lucas is an academic advisor to Arts Council England and was co-author of the first report of the Durham Commission on Creativity in Education in 2019. In 2020, he became Chair of the advisory board at Global Institute of Creative Thinking. He is also a trustee of the English Project, of Winchester Academy Trust and Learning Adviser to Winchester Cathedral.

=== Research ===
Lucas's research expertise includes a wide array of topics including dispositions for learning, (such as creativity, tenacity and zest), pedagogy, parental engagement in schools, the English language, STEM and vocational education. His work is focused on the habits of mind of successful learners and the role schools play in cultivating these habits.

Lucas is known for a number of conceptual developments emerging from the Centre for Real-World Learning at the University of Winchester including a theory of vocational pedagogy; a model of five creative habits of mind; a framing of engineering as a series of habits of mind; the habits of an improver; a four-dimensional model of tenacity; and a framework for zest for learning.

The five-dimensional model of creativity was the initial framework used by OECD in a four-year study in schools across eleven countries, Fostering students’ creativity and critical thinking.

== Awards and honors ==
- Fellow of The Royal Society of Arts
- 1996 - Guardian Jerwood Award for outstanding leadership in voluntary sector
- 2014 - International Fellowship, International Specialized Skills Institute, Australia
- 2017 - Co-chair, PISA 2021 Creative Thinking Strategic Advisory Group, OECD, France
- 2020 - Chair, Advisory Board, Global Insititue of Creative Thinking, United Kingdom

== Bibliography ==
=== Selected books ===
- Lucas, Bill (2009) rEvolution: How to Thrive in Crazy Times.
- Lucas, Bill and Mulvey, Christopher (2013) A History of the English Language in 100 Places.
- Lucas, Bill, Claxton, Guy and Spencer, Ellen (2013) Expansive Education: Teaching Learners for the Real World.
- Claxton, Guy and Lucas, Bill (2015) Educating Ruby: What Children Really Need to Learn.
- Lucas, Bill and Spencer, Ellen (2017) Teaching Creative Thinking: Developing learners who generate ideas and can think critically.
- Lucas, Bill and Spencer, Ellen (2018) Developing Tenacity: Creating learners who persevere in the face of difficulty.
- Lucas, Bill and Spencer, Ellen (2020) Zest for Learning: Developing curious learners who relish real-world challenges.

=== Selected articles and reports ===
- Lucas, Bill. and Claxton, G. and Spencer, E. (2013) Student Creativity in School: First steps towards new forms of formative assessment. OECD Education Working Papers. 86: 1-46.
- Lucas, Bill, Hanson, Janet. and Claxton, Guy. (2014) Thinking Like an Engineer: Implications for the education system. London: Royal Academy of Engineering.
- Lucas, Bill (2015) The habits of an improver: thinking about learning for improvement in healthcare. London: The Health Foundation.
- Lucas, Bill and Spencer, Ellen (2015) Remaking Apprenticeships: powerful learning for work and life. London: City & Guilds
- Lucas, Bill (2016) A Five-Dimensional Model of Creativity and its Assessment in Schools. Applied Measurement in Education, 29(4): 278–290.
- Lucas, Bill and Smith, Charlene (2018) The capable country: Cultivating capabilities in Australian Education. Melbourne: Mitchell Institute
- Lucas, Bill (2019) Why we need to stop talking about twenty-first century skills. Melbourne: Centre for Strategic Education.
