= William Brooks Lucas =

Mississippi politician (1891–1970)

William Brooks Lucas (July 9, 1891 – March 28, 1970) was a lawyer and state legislator in Mississippi. He served in the Mississippi Senate. He lived in Macon, Mississippi and represented Noxubee County. In 1970 a concurrent resolution commended his life and works while mourning his passing.

He first served in the Mississippi Senate in 1944, and served until 1964. He was involved in plans to move the Noxubee County Library into a larger space.
