= Green tree reservoir =

A greentree reservoir (GTR) consists of bottomland hardwood forest land which is shallowly flooded in the fall and winter.

Prior to modern industrialization and commercial farming, the Southeastern United States was home to more than 10 million hectares of bottomland hardwood forest. Today, there is only about 2.8 million hectares remaining (King et al. 2008). Not only are southeastern hardwood forests disappearing, but there has been a huge effort to control water flow so that natural forest flooding is less frequent. Bottomland hardwood forest is an important wetland habitat for many species of waterfowl, as well as other animals. In order to support migrating waterfowl, both private land managers and public agencies implement green tree reservoirs. In a GTR, a forest stand is flooded to create a seasonal wetland. These seasonal wetlands provide habitat and food for waterfowl, amphibians, and many other species.

== Management ==
The water level on green tree reservoirs are manipulated by flooding and “draw down,” a process in which water is drained off of the reservoir. There are many methods for flooding a forest stand (Fredrickson and Batema 1992), many of which use levees or dykes. Water is either diverted from a natural source or pumped onto the landscape. This usually occurs in early winter, when trees are dormant and less likely to be damaged by standing water. The water should be drawn down before the tree dormancy stage has ended. This dormant season coincides with waterfowl migration, providing habitat for migrating birds.

In most cases, GTRs are flooded to a depth of 2-10 inches. Waterfowl in the order Anatinae are dabbling ducks that require only a shallow water depth. Diving ducks are less common on the Mississippi Flyway, but they also can utilize a water depth of only 10 inches. The water depth in a GTR will likely not be uniform. Various water depths allow for different types of food to be available at one time (Fredrickson and Reid 1988). Every species of animal that uses a GTR has slightly different food and habitat needs. Knowing the life history of the target species is critical to proper manipulation of a GTR.

There are plant and tree species specifically beneficial to waterfowl (discussed below), and the abundance of these species and forest composition can be managed by adjusting flood and draw down on the reservoir (Young et al. 1995). Bottomland hardwood forests can also be effectively manipulated by removing timber; in some cases it is required to maintain viable forest stands (Kellison and Young 1997).

Older research reflects the view that standing water in GTRs permanently damages trees and acorn production. (Young et al. 1995, Wigley and Filer 1989). However, more current research (King et al. 2006) shows that when managed properly, green tree reservoirs can be very productive. Many researchers have found that production in GTRs is highest when managers try to emulate natural hardwood wetlands (Fredrickson and Reid 1988, King and Allen 1996). In 1985, 95% of GTRs were flooded annually and for longer than the dormancy season of the forest (Wigley and Filer 1989).

Many plant species are adapted to a higher water tolerance; working with those plants rather than trying to force a dry-adapted plant to function in a wetland has increased GTR success. For example, pin oaks are a wetland oak and have small acorns suitable for waterfowl. In one study, researchers found that pin oak acorns even suffered less insect infestation (and therefore produced more usable food items for waterfowl) in flooded areas than in non-flooded forests (McQuilkin and Musbach 1977). Encouraging wetland plants suited for seasonally flooded areas supports the natural wetland model and results in better food sources. In another example, it was found that fall flooding decreases grain availability for spring-migrating waterfowl (Greer et al. 2007). Now that more research has emerged detailing the natural life history of wetland plants and trees, GTR managers are better prepared to manipulate the resource.

== Waterfowl production ==
The main use of GTRs is to increase production of waterfowl. This is especially true in the southeastern United States, where the Mississippi Flyway encourages duck hunting. Waterfowl that use the Mississippi Flyway include American black duck (Anas rupribes), blue-winged teal (Anas discors), green-winged teal (Anas crecca), gadwall (Anas strepera), northern shoveler (Anas clypeata), northern pintail (Anas acuta), mallard (Anas platyrhynchos), wood duck (Aix sponsa), and many others. Migrating waterfowl have high energy needs and require stopover points on their migration route (Martin and Finch 1995). With much of the bottomland hardwood forest in the southeast US destroyed, GTRs provide food and habitat for waterfowl during migration.

During a migration stopover, studies have shown that a duck’s diet may consist of 60% acorns or mast (Allen 1980). Migrating waterfowl require good sources of carbohydrates and protein.

Acorns are an important food source for waterfowl, but not every acorn is an acceptable food. Acorns must be small enough for a duck to swallow comfortably. Oak species that produce small acorns includes willow oak(Quercus phellos), water oak (Quercus nigra), pin oak (Quercus palustris), Nutall’s oak (Quercus texana), among several others. When a GTR is flooded, these acorns float to the surface; herbaceous vegetation is also available. Invertebrates common in the leaf litter “bloom” and provide protein for breeding waterfowl.

According to the Waterfowl Management Handbook (Fredrickson and Reid 1988), there are three criteria for foods to be available to waterfowl.

“Foods are accessible if:
1. Appropriate water depths are maintained during critical time periods.
2. Habitats are protected from disturbance
3. Habitats that provide protein and energy are close to one another”

According to Fredrickson and Reid (1988), disturbance from any source is detrimental to waterfowl during their stopover. Proper water depths and the juxtaposition of protein and energy contribute to waterfowl success.
