= Brooksville, Mississippi =

- Town
- Location of Brooksville, Mississippi

- Location in the United States
- Coordinates: 33°13′58″N 88°34′54″W
- Country: United States
- State: Mississippi
- County: Noxubee

Area
  - Total: 1.59 sq mi (4.12 km^{2})
  - Land: 1.59 sq mi (4.12 km^{2})
  - Water: 0 sq mi (0.00 km^{2})
- Elevation: 279 ft (85 m)

Population (2020)
  - Total: 915
  - Density: 575.9/sq mi (222.36/km^{2})
- Time zone: UTC-6 (Central (CST))
  - Summer (DST): UTC-5 (CDT)
- ZIP code: 39739
- Area code: 662
- FIPS code: 28-08980
- GNIS feature ID: 0667603
- Website: www.brooksvillems.org

Brooksville is a town in Noxubee County, Mississippi, United States. As of the 2020 census, Brooksville had a population of 915.

The Sam D. Hamilton Noxubee National Wildlife Refuge is located west of the town, and the Black Prairie Wildlife Management Area is located to the north.

== History ==
The town's name comes from the several brooks which flow nearby.

A post office was established in 1846, and the town was incorporated in 1860.

By August 1856, the Mobile and Ohio Railroad had built a line through Brooksville. A station was listed at Brooksville as early as 1874.

Brooksville has a large Holdemann Mennonite community.

== Geography ==
Brooksville is located at 33°13′58″N 88°34′54″W (33.232853, -88.581600).

According to the United States Census Bureau, the town has a total area of 1.0 square mile (2.6 km^{2}), all land.

== Demographics ==
Historical population
Census	Pop.	Note	%±
1880	284		—
1890	424		49.3%
1900	612		44.3%
1910	850		38.9%
1920	854		0.5%
1930	875		2.5%
1940	764		−12.7%
1950	819		7.2%
1960	857		4.6%
1970	978		14.1%
1980	1,038		6.1%
1990	1,098		5.8%
2000	1,182		7.7%
2010	1,223		3.5%
2020	915		−25.2%
U.S. Decennial Census

=== Racial and ethnic composition ===
Brooksville town, Mississippi – Racial and ethnic composition Note: the US Census treats Hispanic/Latino as an ethnic category. This table excludes Latinos from the racial categories and assigns them to a separate category. Hispanics/Latinos may be of any race.
Race / Ethnicity (NH = Non-Hispanic)	Pop 2000	Pop 2010	Pop 2020	% 2000	% 2010	% 2020
White alone (NH)	223	190	186	18.87%	15.54%	20.33%
Black or African American alone (NH)	937	1,009	692	79.27%	82.50%	75.63%
Native American or Alaska Native alone (NH)	0	1	1	0.00%	0.08%	0.11%
Asian alone (NH)	2	1	10	0.17%	0.08%	1.09%
Native Hawaiian or Pacific Islander alone (NH)	0	0	0	0.00%	0.00%	0.00%
Other race alone (NH)	0	0	0	0.00%	0.00%	0.00%
Mixed race or Multiracial (NH)	7	10	12	0.59%	0.82%	1.31%
Hispanic or Latino (any race)	13	12	14	1.10%	0.98%	1.53%
Total	1,182	1,223	915	100.00%	100.00%	100.00%

=== 2020 census ===
As of the 2020 United States census, there were 915 people, 448 households, and 303 families residing in the town.

=== 2000 census ===
At the census of 2000, there were 1,182 people, 439 households, and 305 families residing in the town. The population density was 1,189.1 inhabitants per square mile (459.1/km^{2}). There were 480 housing units at an average density of 482.9 per square mile (186.4/km^{2}). The racial makeup of the town was 19.12% White, 79.61% African American, 0.17% Asian, and 1.10% from two or more races. Hispanic or Latino of any race were 1.10% of the population.

There were 439 households, out of which 35.8% had children under the age of 18 living with them, 31.2% were married couples living together, 33.7% had a female householder with no husband present, and 30.5% were non-families. 28.2% of all households were made up of individuals, and 13.4% had someone living alone who was 65 years of age or older. The average household size was 2.69 and the average family size was 3.30.

In the town, the population was spread out, with 31.7% under the age of 18, 11.5% from 18 to 24, 26.6% from 25 to 44, 16.8% from 45 to 64, and 13.4% who were 65 years of age or older. The median age was 30 years. For every 100 females, there were 88.8 males. For every 100 females age 18 and over, there were 76.6 males.

The median income for a household in the town was $16,146, and the median income for a family was $20,804. Males had a median income of $26,513 versus $17,500 for females. The per capita income for the town was $9,001. About 38.0% of families and 44.4% of the population were below the poverty line, including 57.9% of those under age 18 and 25.2% of those age 65 or over.

In 2010, Brooksville had the 24th-lowest median household income of all places in the United States with a population over 1,000.

== Economy ==
Peco Foods has had a poultry processing plant in Brooksville since 1993, which employs 232 workers.

== Education ==
The town of Brooksville is served by the Noxubee County School District.

== Notable people ==
- Mark Perrin Lowrey Love, member of the Mississippi Senate from 1920 to 1928
- Dave Madison, professional baseball player.
- Carl L. Mickens, member of the Mississippi House of Representatives
- Frederick O'Neal, actor, director, and revolutionary trade unionist.
