= Noxubee County, Mississippi =

County in Mississippi, United States

- County
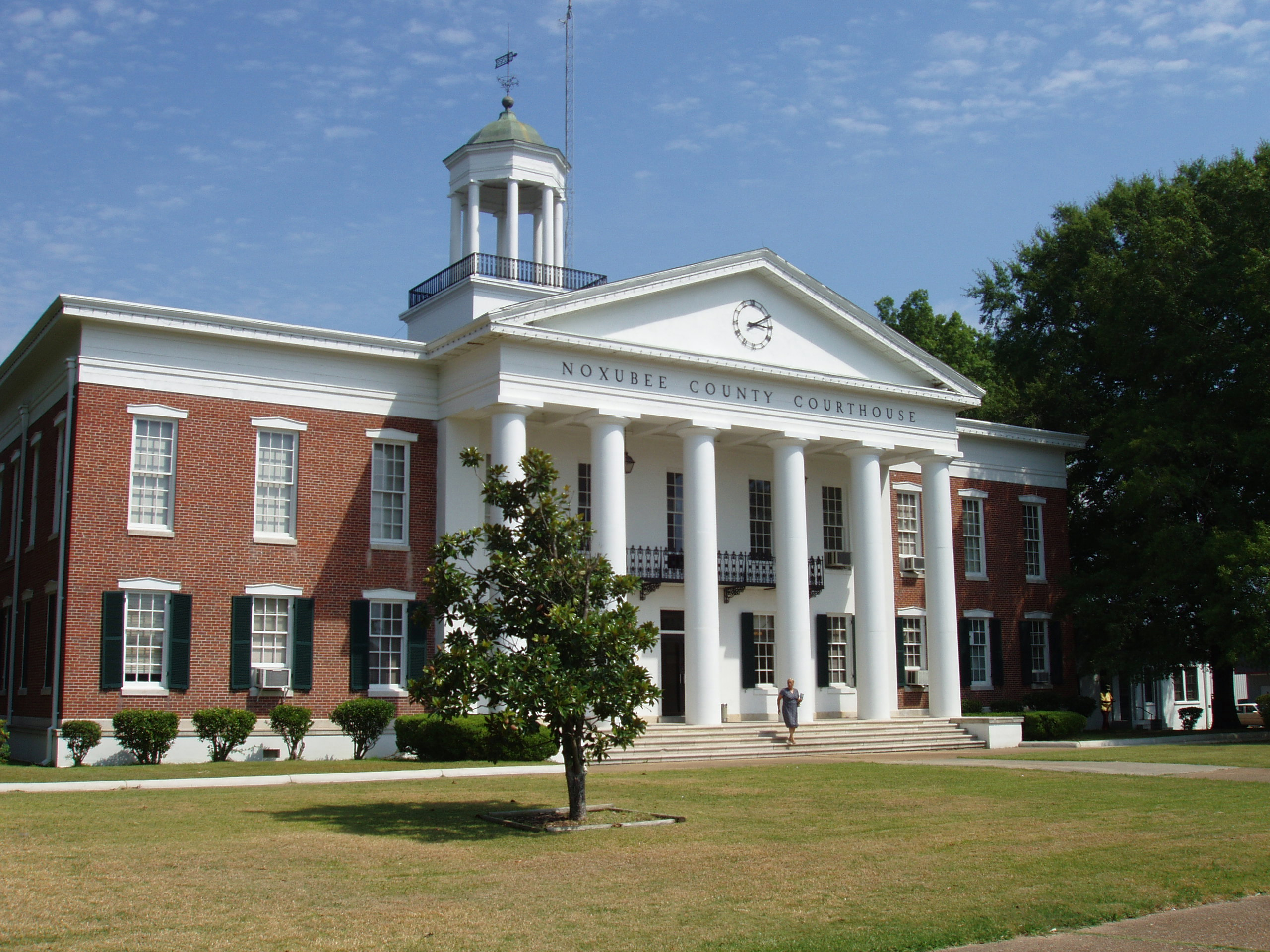
- Noxubee County Courthouse in Macon

- Location within the U.S. state of Mississippi
- Coordinates: 33°07′N 88°34′W
- Country: United States
- State: Mississippi
- Founded: 1833
- Seat: Macon
- Largest city: Macon

Area
  - Total: 700 sq mi (1,800 km^{2})
  - Land: 695 sq mi (1,800 km^{2})
  - Water: 4.8 sq mi (12 km^{2}) 0.7%

Population (2020)
  - Total: 10,285
  - Estimate (2025): 9,798 ▼
  - Density: 14.8/sq mi (5.71/km^{2})
- Time zone: UTC−6 (Central)
  - Summer (DST): UTC−5 (CDT)
- Congressional district: 3rd

Noxubee County (/ˈnɑːksəˌbi/ NAHK-sə-BEE) is a county located in the U.S. state of Mississippi. As of the 2020 census, its population was 10,285. Its county seat is Macon. The name is derived from the Choctaw word nakshobi meaning 'to stink'.

== Geography ==
According to the U.S. Census Bureau, the county has a total area of 700 square miles (1,800 km^{2}), of which 4.8 square miles (12 km^{2}) (0.7%) is covered by water.

=== Major highways ===
- U.S. Highway 45
- Mississippi Highway 14
- Mississippi Highway 21
- Mississippi Highway 39

=== Adjacent counties ===
- Lowndes County (north)
- Pickens County, Alabama (east)
- Sumter County, Alabama (southeast)
- Kemper County (south)
- Winston County (west)
- Oktibbeha County (northwest)

=== National protected area ===
- Noxubee National Wildlife Refuge (part)

== Demographics ==
Historical population
Census	Pop.	Note	%±
1840	9,975		—
1850	16,299		63.4%
1860	20,667		26.8%
1870	20,905		1.2%
1880	29,874		42.9%
1890	27,338		−8.5%
1900	30,846		12.8%
1910	28,503		−7.6%
1920	23,710		−16.8%
1930	25,560		7.8%
1940	25,669		0.4%
1950	20,022		−22.0%
1960	16,826		−16.0%
1970	14,288		−15.1%
1980	13,212		−7.5%
1990	12,604		−4.6%
2000	12,548		−0.4%
2010	11,545		−8.0%
2020	10,285		−10.9%
2025 (est.)	9,798	▼	−4.7%
U.S. Decennial Census; 1790-1960 1900-1990; 1990-2000 2010-2013

=== Racial and ethnic composition ===
Noxubee County, Mississippi – Racial and ethnic composition Note: the US Census treats Hispanic/Latino as an ethnic category. This table excludes Latinos from the racial categories and assigns them to a separate category. Hispanics/Latinos may be of any race.
Race / Ethnicity (NH = Non-Hispanic)	Pop 1980	Pop 1990	Pop 2000	Pop 2010	Pop 2020	% 1980	% 1990	% 2000	% 2010	% 2020
White alone (NH)	4,642	3,952	3,667	3,113	2,639	35.13%	31.36%	29.22%	26.96%	25.66%
Black or African American alone (NH)	8,403	8,575	8,634	8,249	7,190	63.60%	68.03%	68.81%	71.45%	69.91%
Native American or Alaska Native alone (NH)	20	44	19	20	13	0.15%	0.35%	0.15%	0.17%	0.13%
Asian alone (NH)	4	6	13	22	14	0.03%	0.05%	0.10%	0.19%	0.14%
Native Hawaiian or Pacific Islander alone (NH)	x	x	0	1	0	x	x	0.00%	0.01%	0.00%
Other race alone (NH)	0	0	13	1	4	0.00%	0.00%	0.10%	0.01%	0.04%
Mixed race or Multiracial (NH)	x	x	61	47	253	x	x	0.49%	0.41%	2.46%
Hispanic or Latino (any race)	143	27	141	92	172	1.08%	0.21%	1.12%	0.80%	1.67%
Total	13,212	12,604	12,548	11,545	10,285	100.00%	100.00%	100.00%	100.00%	100.00%

=== 2020 census ===
As of the 2020 census, the county had a population of 10,285. The median age was 39.8 years. 24.1% of residents were under the age of 18 and 17.4% of residents were 65 years of age or older. For every 100 females there were 89.7 males, and for every 100 females age 18 and over there were 85.4 males age 18 and over.

The racial makeup of the county was 25.9% White, 70.3% Black or African American, 0.1% American Indian and Alaska Native, 0.1% Asian, <0.1% Native Hawaiian and Pacific Islander, 0.8% from some other race, and 2.8% from two or more races. Hispanic or Latino residents of any race comprised 1.7% of the population.

<0.1% of residents lived in urban areas, while 100.0% lived in rural areas.

There were 4,088 households in the county, of which 31.6% had children under the age of 18 living in them. Of all households, 33.6% were married-couple households, 20.6% were households with a male householder and no spouse or partner present, and 41.8% were households with a female householder and no spouse or partner present. About 30.8% of all households were made up of individuals and 12.2% had someone living alone who was 65 years of age or older.

There were 4,705 housing units, of which 13.1% were vacant. Among occupied housing units, 72.2% were owner-occupied and 27.8% were renter-occupied. The homeowner vacancy rate was 0.7% and the rental vacancy rate was 7.5%.

=== 2010 census ===
As of the 2010 United States census, 11,545 people lived in the county; 71.6% were African American, 27.1% White, 0.2% Asian, 0.2% Native American, 0.4% of some other race, and 0.5% of two or more races, and 0.8% were Hispanic or Latino (of any race).

=== 2000 census ===
As of the census of 2000, 12,548 people, 4,470 households, and 3,222 families were living in the county. The population density was 18 people per square mile (6.9 people/km^{2}). The 5,228 housing units had an average density of 8 units per square mile (3.1 units/km^{2}). The racial makeup of the county was 69.30% Black, 29.49% White, 0.15% Native American, 0.11% Asian, 0.37% from other races, and 0.58% from two or more races. About 1.12% of the population were Hispanics or Latinos of any race.

Of the 4,470 households, 35.8% had children under 18 living with them, 43.0% were married couples living together, 24.7% had a female householder with no husband present, and 27.9% were not families. About 25.9% of all households were made up of individuals, and 11.5% had someone living alone who was 65 or older. The average household size was 2.77, and the average family size was 3.36.

In the county, the age distribution was 30.7% under 18, 10.3% from 18 to 24, 26.7% from 25 to 44, 19.5% from 45 to 64, and 12.8% who were 65 or older. The median age was 32 years. For every 100 females, there were 90.50 males. For every 100 females 18 and over, there were 84.60 males.

The median income for a household in the county was $22,330, and for a family was $27,312. Males had a median income of $25,008 versus $17,636 for females. The per capita income for the county was $12,018. About 29.20% of families and 32.80% of the population were below the poverty line, including 43.60% of those under age 18 and 25.30% of those age 65 or over.

== Politics ==
United States presidential election results for Noxubee County, Mississippi
Year	Republican		Democratic		Third party(ies)	
Year	No.	%	No.	%	No.	%
1912	5	0.75%	646	97.00%	15	2.25%
1916	10	1.49%	656	98.06%	3	0.45%
1920	24	3.31%	701	96.56%	1	0.14%
1924	44	4.36%	966	95.64%	0	0.00%
1928	102	8.13%	1,153	91.87%	0	0.00%
1932	41	3.74%	1,052	95.99%	3	0.27%
1936	27	1.99%	1,332	97.94%	1	0.07%
1940	51	4.24%	1,152	95.76%	0	0.00%
1944	103	9.39%	994	90.61%	0	0.00%
1948	17	1.52%	74	6.60%	1,031	91.89%
1952	887	53.92%	758	46.08%	0	0.00%
1956	257	19.47%	690	52.27%	373	28.26%
1960	342	22.97%	277	18.60%	870	58.43%
1964	1,980	96.59%	70	3.41%	0	0.00%
1968	232	6.34%	1,387	37.91%	2,040	55.75%
1972	2,239	66.28%	1,052	31.14%	87	2.58%
1976	1,860	44.97%	2,121	51.28%	155	3.75%
1980	1,970	35.46%	3,434	61.82%	151	2.72%
1984	2,123	41.23%	2,928	56.87%	98	1.90%
1988	1,870	40.38%	2,722	58.78%	39	0.84%
1992	1,623	32.22%	3,188	63.29%	226	4.49%
1996	1,287	29.94%	2,801	65.17%	210	4.89%
2000	1,530	30.88%	3,383	68.29%	41	0.83%
2004	1,723	28.26%	4,346	71.28%	28	0.46%
2008	1,525	23.14%	5,030	76.34%	34	0.52%
2012	1,325	21.15%	4,920	78.54%	19	0.30%
2016	1,200	21.53%	4,347	77.99%	27	0.48%
2020	1,240	23.23%	4,040	75.67%	59	1.11%
2024	1,151	25.87%	3,269	73.48%	29	0.65%

Noxubee County is solidly Democratic in modern presidential elections, having last voted for the Republican nominee in 1972. This is the result of the Voting Rights Act of 1965, which returned the vote to the African-American majority after nearly a century of whites-only elections.

In the final presidential contest before the act's passage, the 1964 election, anti-civil rights whites in Noxubee gave 96.6% of the county's vote to Republican Barry Goldwater — a margin no candidate of either party has surpassed in any county in any subsequent presidential election. Goldwater received 1,980 votes to incumbent Lyndon B. Johnson's 70.

== Law enforcement ==
The Noxubee County Sheriff's Department has been embroiled in controversies related to covering up rape and abuse at its facilities. In 2023, former sheriff Terry Grassaree faced criminal charges for his involvement in rape cases.

In 2023, The New York Times and the Mississippi Center for Investigative Reporting at Mississippi Today uncovered gross mismanagement at the Noxubee County jail, enabling male inmates to rape and abuse female inmates.

== Education ==
Public elementary and secondary education is administered by the Noxubee County School District, which includes the entire county.

Noxubee County is within the service area of the East Mississippi Community College system. The system offers classes in the Macon Extension at Noxubee County High School in Macon.

At one time, many more schools existed within the county. In the early 20th century, 19 of these were consolidated into two districts consisting of six schools, which were Salem, Lynn Creek, Center Point, Cliftonville, Cooksville-Paulette, Mashulaville, and Brooksville. The old Salem School was added to the National Register of Historic Places in 1989. The Noxubee County Agricultural School at Mashulaville opened in 1910 and included a 40-acre farm and provided living arrangements for up to 40 boarding students.

The public school population is 1% White, compared to 27% of the county population. Central Academy in Macon, which was founded in 1968 as a segregation academy, closed in 2017. In 1982, private deals that had been made between board members to use public funds to aid Central Academy became public. As a result, the NAACP called for the resignation of all Noxubee county school board members who had knowledge of the board's aid to Central Academy, which at the time did not enroll any black students.

== United States v. Ike Brown ==
In 2005, the U.S. Department of Justice began an investigation and the following year filed suit under the Voting Rights Act alleging that the chairman of the Noxubee County Democratic Party, Ike Brown, had conspired to orchestrate "relentless racial discrimination" against White voters.

The court ruled that Brown, in conjunction with the Noxubee Democratic Executive Committee, had "manipulated the political process in ways specifically intended and designed to impair and impede participation of White voters and to dilute their votes". This was the first time the Voting Rights Act of 1965 had been used to allege discrimination against Whites.

== Communities ==
=== City ===
- Macon

=== Towns ===
- Brooksville
- Shuqualak

=== Unincorporated communities ===
- Bigbee Valley
- Deerbrook
- Gholson
- Mashulaville

== See also ==
- National Register of Historic Places listings in Noxubee County, Mississippi
- Noxubee National Wildlife Refuge
