= List of United States tornadoes from September to December 2016 =

This is a list of all tornadoes that were confirmed by local offices of the National Weather Service in the United States from September to December 2016.

== United States yearly total ==
Confirmed tornadoes by Enhanced Fujita rating
EFU	EF0	EF1	EF2	EF3	EF4	EF5	Total
30	530	311	75	26	2	0	974

== September ==
Confirmed tornadoes by Enhanced Fujita rating
EFU	EF0	EF1	EF2	EF3	EF4	EF5	Total
1	27	11	1	0	0	0	40

=== September 1 event ===
List of confirmed tornadoes – Thursday, September 1, 2016 (Note: All dates are based on the local time zone where the tornado touched down; however, all times are in Coordinated Universal Time for consistency. All damage totals are in 2016 USD.)
EF#	Location	County / Parish	State	Start Coord.	Time (UTC)	Path length	Max width	Damage (2016 USD)
EFU	W of Lordsburg	Hidalgo	NM	32.3557°N 108.7427°W	2230–2235	0.38 mi (0.61 km)	20 yd (18 m)	$0
EFU	A trained storm spotter photographed a landspout tornado; no damage was evident.							
EF0	WNW of Steinhatchee	Taylor	FL	29.71°N 83.47°W	0007	0.01 mi (0.016 km)	25 yd (23 m)	$0
EF0	A county deputy reported a brief tornado.							
EF0	S of Perry	Taylor	FL	29.91°N 83.56°W	0036	0.01 mi (0.016 km)	25 yd (23 m)	$0
EF0	A county deputy reported a brief tornado.							
EF0	W of Bay Hill	Orange	FL	28.4542°N 81.6281°W	0038–0039	1.51 mi (2.43 km)	150 yd (140 m)	$21,000
EF0	Over 100 trees were snapped or uprooted. Several homes sustained damage to their air conditioning units, windows, and soffits. A pool screen enclosure and a fence were damaged.							
EF0	NNW of Leesburg	Lake	FL	28.8611°N 81.9128°W	0040–0044	4.35 mi (7.00 km)	250 yd (230 m)	$22,000
EF0	Trees, branches, and power lines were downed. Two homes sustained structural damage due to fallen trees.							
EF0	SW of Salem	Taylor	FL	29.87°N 83.42°W	0239	0.01 mi (0.016 km)	25 yd (23 m)	$0
EF0	A storm chaser reported a tornado with power flashes evident.							

=== September 2 event ===
List of confirmed tornadoes – Friday, September 2, 2016
EF#	Location	County / Parish	State	Start Coord.	Time (UTC)	Path length	Max width	Damage (2016 USD)
EF1	Riceboro	Liberty	GA	31.66°N 81.38°W	0750–0759	4.84 mi (7.79 km)	650 yd (590 m)	Unknown
EF1	The tornado snapped and uprooted thousands of trees. Many large oak and pine trees were snapped or lost large limbs. Several structures suffered minor damage from fallen trees.							
EF1	Skidaway Island	Chatham	GA	31.93°N 81.03°W	0912–0915	1.38 mi (2.22 km)	350 yd (320 m)	Unknown
EF1	The tornado snapped and uprooted hundreds of large pine and oak structures. About twenty homes suffered roof damage from fallen trees. One house had its roof torn off.							
EF0	NW of Yuma	Washington	CO	40.22°N 102.87°W	2205	0.01 mi (0.016 km)	50 yd (46 m)	$0
EF0	Law enforcement reported a brief tornado.							
EF1	NNW of Harkers Island	Carteret	NC	34.724°N 76.573°W	0120–0121	0.15 mi (0.24 km)	50 yd (46 m)	$150,000
EF1	Brief tornado caused significant damage to a boat storage facility, minor siding and window damage to a mobile home, and roof damage to a small business. Several trees had their branches broken or trunks snapped as well.							
EF1	Marshallberg	Carteret	NC	34.725°N 76.508°W	0123–0124	0.35 mi (0.56 km)	50 yd (46 m)	$75,000
EF1	Brief tornado caused significant roof and porch damage to a house, minor siding damage to a mobile home, and knocked down five power poles. Several boats were blown off their trailer, one of which was tossed about 100 yards (91 m), and several trees had their trunks snapped or branches broken.							

=== September 3 event ===
List of confirmed tornadoes – Saturday, September 3, 2016
EF#	Location	County / Parish	State	Start Coord.	Time (UTC)	Path length	Max width	Damage (2016 USD)
EF0	Hatteras	Dare	NC	35.2135°N 75.6957°W	0502–0503	0.07 mi (0.11 km)	25 yd (23 m)	$250,000
EF0	Brief tornado touched down at the Hatteras Sands RV Resort, damaging or destroying about five travel trailers and camping cabins. Three people were injured.							

=== September 4 event ===
List of confirmed tornadoes – Sunday, September 4, 2016
EF#	Location	County / Parish	State	Start Coord.	Time (UTC)	Path length	Max width	Damage (2016 USD)
EF1	NW of Pinedale	Sublette	WY	43.0661°N 110.2556°W	1906–1912	2.42 mi (3.89 km)	300 yd (270 m)	$1,000
EF1	Sporadic tree damage was observed; fallen trees fell on some fence line.							
EF0	N of Potter	Cheyenne	NE	41.44°N 103.31°W	2128–?	Unknown	Unknown	Unknown
EF0	A storm chaser observed a landspout tornado over open country which lasted less than five minutes.							
EF0	NNW of Stapleton	Logan	NE	41.61°N 100.59°W	0212	0.01 mi (0.016 km)	10 yd (9.1 m)	$0
EF0	Storm chasers reported a brief tornado which caused no damage.							

=== September 6 event ===
List of confirmed tornadoes – Tuesday, September 6, 2016
EF#	Location	County / Parish	State	Start Coord.	Time (UTC)	Path length	Max width	Damage (2016 USD)
EF0	WNW of Cresco	Howard	IA	43.4085°N 92.237°W	2250–2251	0.02 mi (0.032 km)	25 yd (23 m)	$200
EF0	A brief tornado caused minor damage.							

=== September 7 event ===
List of confirmed tornadoes – Wednesday, September 7, 2016
EF#	Location	County / Parish	State	Start Coord.	Time (UTC)	Path length	Max width	Damage (2016 USD)
EF1	Camp Ripley	Morrison	MN	46.0618°N 94.4521°W	0328–0337	7.28 mi (11.72 km)	100 yd (91 m)	$1,000,000
EF1	The tornado uprooted trees, overturned boats, and tore the roofs from two apartment-style buildings.							

=== September 9 event ===
List of confirmed tornadoes – Friday, September 9, 2016
EF#	Location	County / Parish	State	Start Coord.	Time (UTC)	Path length	Max width	Damage (2016 USD)
EF0	SW of Catlin	Vermillion	IL	40.0449°N 87.7278°W	2313–2314	0.1 mi (0.16 km)	10 yd (9.1 m)	$10,000
EF0	The tornado briefly touched down in a field and caused minor damage to crops.							
EF0	N of Gruver	Hansford	TX	36.34°N 101.41°W	2320–2321	0.28 mi (0.45 km)	15 yd (14 m)	$0
EF0	Numerous citizens reported a brief tornado.							
EF0	Red Lake	Beltrami	MN	47.8878°N 94.7866°W	2320–2324	0.35 mi (0.56 km)	50 yd (46 m)	$0
EF0	A waterspout moved over the far southeast corner of Red Lake and dissipated as it approached land.							
EF2	S of Sidney	Champaign	IL	39.9772°N 88.0603°W	2333–2348	4.69 mi (7.55 km)	75 yd (69 m)	$900,000
EF2	The tornado knocked down trees, destroyed a garage, a barn, and outbuildings. A car and RV were damaged. Headstones were overturned in a cemetery. One house suffered roof damage while another was pushed off its foundation and collapsed.							
EF1	SW of Bismarck	Vermillion	IL	40.2213°N 87.6437°W	2334–2343	1.63 mi (2.62 km)	50 yd (46 m)	$50,000
EF1	The tornado damaged trees, blew shingles from the roof of a house, and blew over a camper.							
EF0	S of Casey	Clark	IL	39.2797°N 87.9859°W	2344–2345	0.1 mi (0.16 km)	10 yd (9.1 m)	$10,000
EF0	The tornado briefly touched down in a field and damaged crops.							

=== September 13 event ===
List of confirmed tornadoes – Tuesday, September 13, 2016
EF#	Location	County / Parish	State	Start Coord.	Time (UTC)	Path length	Max width	Damage (2016 USD)
EF0	Barefoot Bay	Brevard	FL	27.863°N 80.549°W	1751–1759	3.47 mi (5.58 km)	250 yd (230 m)	$40,000
EF0	The tornado moved mostly over remote areas. Large tree limbs broke. One house lost part of its roof and had its patio enclosure destroyed. An RV was toppled onto the side of another home.							

=== September 14 event ===
List of confirmed tornadoes – Wednesday, September 14, 2016
EF#	Location	County / Parish	State	Start Coord.	Time (UTC)	Path length	Max width	Damage (2016 USD)
EF0	WSW of Clovis	Roosevelt	NM	34.325°N 103.8229°W	0607–0630	3.15 mi (5.07 km)	50 yd (46 m)	Unknown
EF0	A 2,000 lb (32,000 oz) bolted-down mobile office trailer was lifted and moved 8–10 in (200–250 mm).							

=== September 15 event ===
List of confirmed tornadoes – Thursday, September 15, 2016
EF#	Location	County / Parish	State	Start Coord.	Time (UTC)	Path length	Max width	Damage (2016 USD)
EF0	WNW of Artesia	Chaves	NM	32.8964°N 105.0691°W	2010–2030	4.73 mi (7.61 km)	50 yd (46 m)	$0
EF0	The public reported a tornado.							
EF0	W of Hope	Eddy	NM	32.8°N 104.7472°W	2206–2226	4 mi (6.4 km)	300 yd (270 m)	$0
EF0	Several Skywarn spotters reported a tornado.							

=== September 16 event ===
List of confirmed tornadoes – Friday, September 16, 2016
EF#	Location	County / Parish	State	Start Coord.	Time (UTC)	Path length	Max width	Damage (2016 USD)
EF0	S of Blair	Washington	NE	41.4261°N 96.0976°W	0500–0501	0.06 mi (0.097 km)	10 yd (9.1 m)	$0
EF0	A brief tornado caused minor damage.							
EF0	NW of Odessa	Ector	TX	31.9256°N 102.4409°W	2353–2355	0.35 mi (0.56 km)	200 yd (180 m)	$0
EF0	A broadcast meteorologist relayed video and photo evidence of a tornado.							

=== September 17 event ===
List of confirmed tornadoes – Saturday, September 17, 2016
EF#	Location	County / Parish	State	Start Coord.	Time (UTC)	Path length	Max width	Damage (2016 USD)
EF0	Cheyenne Wells	Cheyenne	CO	38.8166°N 102.3759°W	2143–2157	0.85 mi (1.37 km)	100 yd (91 m)	$46,000
EF0	A landspout tornado caused sporadic damage, largely on the southern side of Cheyenne Wells. An outbuilding was blown over. Windows were broken, shingles were removed, fences were blown over and tree limbs were broken. A tree fell into a home, a garage door was blown in, and a metal building suffered minor roof damage.							
EF0	N of Cheyenne Wells	Cheyenne	CO	38.8694°N 102.3829°W	2143–2200	1.92 mi (3.09 km)	100 yd (91 m)	$0
EF0	A landspout tornado moved over open country causing no reported damage.							
EF0	S of Weskan	Wallace	KS	38.80°N 101.96°W	2200–2215	3 mi (4.8 km)	100 yd (91 m)	Unknown
EF0	A landspout tornado moved over open country causing no reported damage.							
EF1	Scandia	Warren	PA	41.9103°N 79.0334°W	2235–2240	1.6 mi (2.6 km)	40 yd (37 m)	$20,000
EF1	The tornado picked up a large pole barn/garage and threw the debris 200 yards (180 m) into a stand of trees. A line of trees nearby suffered substantial damage, with sporadic tree damage continuing for another 0.5 miles (0.80 km) from that location. An eyewitness reported seeing two funnels as the tornado dissipated.							
EF0	NNE of Carlsbad	Eddy	NM	32.6473°N 104.1183°W	2250–2253	0.92 mi (1.48 km)	200 yd (180 m)	$0
EF0	A trained storm spotter reported a tornado over open fields.							
EF1	NNW of Notrees	Andrews, Ector	TX	32.095°N 102.8059°W	0013–0035	5.87 mi (9.45 km)	400 yd (370 m)	$30,000
EF1	Power poles were snapped and a tank battery was overturned.							
EF0	SW of Dumas	Moore	TX	35.7132°N 102.0688°W	0241–0242	0.01 mi (0.016 km)	15 yd (14 m)	$0
EF0	A deputy and trained storm spotter witnessed a brief tornado.							
EF0	S of Dumas	Moore	TX	35.6876°N 101.9797°W	0247–0254	1.17 mi (1.88 km)	150 yd (140 m)	Unknown
EF0	The tornado caused widespread tree damage, destroyed a shed, and damaged the roof of a mobile home.							

=== September 21 event ===
List of confirmed tornadoes – Wednesday, September 21, 2016
EF#	Location	County / Parish	State	Start Coord.	Time (UTC)	Path length	Max width	Damage (2016 USD)
EF0	W of Powersville	Floyd	IA	42.9155°N 92.7308°W	2332–2335	1.65 mi (2.66 km)	50 yd (46 m)	$6,000
EF0	Some crop damage occurred.							

=== September 22 event ===
List of confirmed tornadoes – Thursday, September 22, 2016
EF#	Location	County / Parish	State	Start Coord.	Time (UTC)	Path length	Max width	Damage (2016 USD)
EF1	Washington Terrace to South Ogden	Weber	UT	41.1631°N 112.0104°W	2145–2200	2.85 mi (4.59 km)	50 yd (46 m)	$2,000,000
EF1	The tornado produced damage to trees, homes, and other structures along an intermittent path.							
EF1	Panguitch	Garfield	UT	37.8339°N 112.4309°W	0054–0110	0.75 mi (1.21 km)	25 yd (23 m)	$300,000
EF1	The tornado produced EF0 damage to homes and trees and EF1 damage to a business along an intermittent path.							

== October ==
Confirmed tornadoes by Enhanced Fujita rating
EFU	EF0	EF1	EF2	EF3	EF4	EF5	Total
1	9	8	2	1	0	0	21

=== October 4 event ===
List of confirmed tornadoes – Tuesday, October 4, 2016
EF#	Location	County / Parish	State	Start Coord.	Time (UTC)	Path length	Max width	Damage (2016 USD)
EF0	N of Vine Creek	Ottawa	KS	39.2482°N 97.4066°W	2232	0.1 mi (0.16 km)	40 yd (37 m)	$0
EF0	A storm chaser videoed a brief tornado in an open field.							
EF1	N of Green	Clay	KS	39.4411°N 97.0346°W	2327–2335	4.92 mi (7.92 km)	75 yd (69 m)	$0
EF1	The tornado damaged several trees and a house.							

=== October 6 event ===
List of confirmed tornadoes – Thursday, October 6, 2016
EF#	Location	County / Parish	State	Start Coord.	Time (UTC)	Path length	Max width	Damage (2016 USD)
EF0	S of Bartlett	Labette	KS	37.0294°N 95.2163°W	1657–1659	0.22 mi (0.35 km)	50 yd (46 m)	$0
EF0	A trained storm spotter reported a brief tornado.							
EF0	E of Bartlett	Labette	KS	37.05°N 95.18°W	1714–1715	0.14 mi (0.23 km)	50 yd (46 m)	$0
EF0	Numerous tree limbs were downed.							
EF0	SE of Winfield	Cowley	KS	37.1691°N 96.9803°W	1926–1927	0.03 mi (0.048 km)	50 yd (46 m)	$0
EF0	Tornado remained over open country and caused no damage.							
EF1	SW of Burden	Cowley	KS	37.2268°N 96.8084°W	1942–1944	0.14 mi (0.23 km)	50 yd (46 m)	$25,100
EF1	An open-ended horse barn and a grain bin were destroyed and tossed northeast.							
EF1	W of Cambridge	Cowley	KS	37.3197°N 96.7012°W	2008–2015	0.51 mi (0.82 km)	75 yd (69 m)	$20,000
EF1	The tornado damaged trees along its path, including a large oak tree that was uprooted.							
EF2	SE of Salina	Saline	KS	38.7407°N 97.5156°W	2113–2115	0.21 mi (0.34 km)	60 yd (55 m)	$0
EF2	A barn was destroyed with debris strewn to the northeast, and a few trees were damaged as well.							
EF1	S of Palmer	Clay, Washington	KS	39.5423°N 97.1833°W	2118–2135	9.97 mi (16.05 km)	200 yd (180 m)	$0
EF1	The tornado damaged two abandoned farm structures and many trees.							
EF3	E of Salina	Saline	KS	38.7815°N 97.4704°W	2119–2128	6.48 mi (10.43 km)	140 yd (130 m)	$0
EF3	Large stovepipe tornado obliterated a well strapped down double-wide manufactured home, with little debris remaining. A nearby jeep was rolled approximately 200 yd (180 m), and several pieces of farm equipment were tossed, including a combine rolled about 75 yd (69 m). Trees were snapped, completely defoliated, and denuded as well.							
EF1	S of Clay Center	Clay	KS	39.2998°N 97.163°W	2136–2152	6.41 mi (10.32 km)	300 yd (270 m)	$0
EF1	A hunting cabin was destroyed and blown into a pond and few farm outbuildings were destroyed. Two grain bins were dented, four power poles were snapped, and several trees were snapped and uprooted as well.							
EF1	SSW of Muscatine	Muscatine	IA	41.4677°N 91.097°W	0307–0318	9.52 mi (15.32 km)	30 yd (27 m)	$0
EF1	A fast-moving tornado mostly caused damage to crops. A few trees were snapped at their trunks and two outbuildings were completely destroyed as well.							
EF1	Davenport to Cordova	Scott, Rock Island	IA, IL	41.5049°N 90.6173°W	0336–0400	20.02 mi (32.22 km)	800 yd (730 m)	$0
EF1	Most of the damage was to trees, some of which fell onto cars and homes. The prison and a homeless shelter in downtown Davenport suffered roof damage.							
EF0	SE of Oak Grove	Rock Island	IL	41.3796°N 90.5125°W	0341–0346	4.86 mi (7.82 km)	10 yd (9.1 m)	$0
EF0	A fast-moving tornado mostly caused damage to crops and trees.							

=== October 8 event ===
These tornadoes were associated with the rainbands of Hurricane Matthew as it neared South Carolina.

List of confirmed tornadoes – Saturday, October 8, 2016
EF#	Location	County / Parish	State	Start Coord.	Time (UTC)	Path length	Max width	Damage (2016 USD)
EF0	North Myrtle Beach	Horry	SC	33.8243°N 78.651°W	1046–1049	1.53 mi (2.46 km)	25 yd (23 m)	Unknown
EF0	A weak tornado downed many trees and caused minor structural damage to subdivisions and a couple of businesses.							
EF0	N of Walnut Creek	Wayne	NC	35.323°N 77.8625°W	1850–1853	0.93 mi (1.50 km)	250 yd (230 m)	$100,000
EF0	Numerous trees were snapped or uprooted. Several buildings sustained minor roof damage, a billboard was destroyed, and a camper was uplifted and rotated around an adjacent building. Several fences were downed.							

=== October 12 event ===
List of confirmed tornadoes – Wednesday, October 12, 2016
EF#	Location	County / Parish	State	Start Coord.	Time (UTC)	Path length	Max width	Damage (2016 USD)
EF0	SW of South Bend	St. Joseph	IN	41.6421°N 86.3046°W	2226–2227	1.25 mi (2.01 km)	30 yd (27 m)	$0
EF0	Tornado was embedded within a larger area of straight line winds. A narrow path of convergent corn damage was observed.							
EF0	South Bend	St. Joseph	IN	41.6685°N 86.2307°W	2230–2231	0.05 mi (0.080 km)	40 yd (37 m)	$0
EF0	Brief tornado in the city of South Bend downed several large tree limbs, one of which landed on a shed. Tornado was embedded in a larger area of straight line winds.							

=== October 14 event ===
List of confirmed tornadoes – Friday, October 14, 2016
EF#	Location	County / Parish	State	Start Coord.	Time (UTC)	Path length	Max width	Damage (2016 USD)
EF2	Manzanita	Tillamook	OR	45.72°N 123.94°W	1518–1520	0.7 mi (1.1 km)	225 yd (206 m)	$1,000,000
EF2	See article on this tornado – One home and two businesses were destroyed and 128 other homes were damaged by a strong waterspout that moved ashore. The mayor of Manzanita declared a state of emergency in response to the tornado.							
EFU	Oceanside	Tillamook	OR	45.47°N 123.97°W	1600–1605	0.01 mi (0.016 km)	10 yd (9.1 m)	$0
EFU	A waterspout moved ashore but caused no damage.							

=== October 22 event ===
List of confirmed tornadoes – Saturday, October 22, 2016
EF#	Location	County / Parish	State	Start Coord.	Time (UTC)	Path length	Max width	Damage (2016 USD)
EF1	WSW of Delhi	Delaware	IA	42.4112°N 91.393°W	0154	0.25 mi (0.40 km)	Unknown	Unknown
EF1	A tornado damaged three to four trees and downed numerous branches.							

== November ==
Confirmed tornadoes by Enhanced Fujita rating
EFU	EF0	EF1	EF2	EF3	EF4	EF5	Total
0	18	23	6	3	0	0	50

=== November 18 event ===
List of confirmed tornadoes – Friday, November 18, 2016
EF#	Location	County / Parish	State	Start Coord.	Time (UTC)	Path length	Max width	Damage (2016 USD)
EF0	Manatí	Manatí	PR	18.43°N 66.4825°W	19:10–19:20	0.62 mi (1.00 km)	1,091.2 yd (997.8 m)	$10,000
EF0	Weak structures were damaged by tornadic winds or flying debris. Galvanized roofs and large trees were ripped off.							

=== November 22 event ===
List of confirmed tornadoes – Tuesday, November 22, 2016
EF#	Location	County / Parish	State	Start Coord.	Time (UTC)	Path length	Max width	Damage (2016 USD)
EF0	Fort Riley	Riley	KS	39.1999°N 96.8252°W	21:51	0.3 mi (0.48 km)	25 yd (23 m)	$0
EF0	The Manhattan airport tower and airline pilot reported a brief tornado.							

=== November 27 event ===
List of confirmed tornadoes – Sunday, November 27, 2016
EF#	Location	County / Parish	State	Start Coord.	Time (UTC)	Path length	Max width	Damage (2016 USD)
EF0	WSW of Upland	Franklin	NE	40.3°N 98.95°W	22:02–22:04	0.53 mi (0.85 km)	20 yd (18 m)	$0
EF0	A damage survey indicated a brief tornado touchdown.							
EF1	E of Red Cloud	Webster	NE	40.09°N 98.47°W	22:32–22:39	3.79 mi (6.10 km)	60 yd (55 m)	$150,000
EF1	A tornado occurred over mostly rural farmland and forest. A few large hardwood trees were uprooted, power poles downed, and a watering pivot was damaged. An outbuilding was flipped over, and debris splatter was noted at a house.							
EF0	E of Lawrence	Nuckolls	NE	40.27°N 98.15°W	23:00–23:05	4.2 mi (6.8 km)	50 yd (46 m)	$3,000
EF0	Some power poles were lightly damaged, and an animal feeder was tossed across a road, leaving it mangled.							

=== November 28 event ===
List of confirmed tornadoes – Monday, November 28, 2016
EF#	Location	County / Parish	State	Start Coord.	Time (UTC)	Path length	Max width	Damage (2016 USD)
EF0	Radcliffe	Hardin	IA	42.317°N 93.4274°W	18:44–18:55	5.22 mi (8.40 km)	50 yd (46 m)	$5,000
EF0	Tree limbs and power lines were downed in town. A few homes sustained roof damage, and a pickup truck was tipped on its side.							
EF0	Eastern Parkersburg	Grundy, Butler	IA	42.5248°N 92.8034°W	21:38–21:50	5.68 mi (9.14 km)	50 yd (46 m)	$3,000
EF0	Minor roof damage occurred at the east edge of town, and a shed was blown off of its cinder block foundation.							
EF0	W of Grundy Center	Grundy	IA	42.3463°N 92.834°W	21:41–21:44	1.47 mi (2.37 km)	25 yd (23 m)	$0
EF0	Minor tree damage occurred.							
EF0	NE of New Sharon	Mahaska, Poweshiek	IA	41.4947°N 92.6257°W	22:11–22:21	4.54 mi (7.31 km)	40 yd (37 m)	$0
EF0	A tornado debris signature was evident on radar; little damage occurred.							
EF0	SE of Marksville	Avoyelles	LA	31.073°N 92.0329°W	22:25	0.01 mi (0.016 km)	10 yd (9.1 m)	$0
EF0	An emergency manager reported a brief tornado in an open field.							
EF0	SE of Montezuma	Poweshiek	IA	41.5648°N 92.5098°W	22:30–22:33	1.17 mi (1.88 km)	30 yd (27 m)	$0
EF0	Law enforcement reported a brief tornado.							

=== November 29 event ===
List of confirmed tornadoes – Tuesday, November 29, 2016
EF#	Location	County / Parish	State	Start Coord.	Time (UTC)	Path length	Max width	Damage (2016 USD)
EF1	NNE of Pelahatchie to E of Walnut Grove	Rankin, Scott, Leake	MS	32.4020°N 89.7807°W	21:57–22:37	23.95 mi (38.54 km)	300 yd (270 m)	$200,000
EF1	A few homes were damaged by fallen trees and some sustained minor roof damage, several sheds or outbuildings were destroyed, and some power lines were downed. Trees were snapped or uprooted along the path.							
EF1	N of Preston to NNW of Gholson	Winston, Noxubee	MS	32.95°N 88.84°W	23:49–00:00	5.53 mi (8.90 km)	170 yd (160 m)	$180,000
EF1	One mobile home was heavily damaged, two others had skirting blown out, and a large tractor shed was destroyed. One home had a tree downed on it, some power lines were downed, and trees were snapped or uprooted along the path.							
EF1	E of Oktoc	Oktibbeha	MS	33.30°N 88.76°W	23:52–23:58	3.59 mi (5.78 km)	150 yd (140 m)	$45,000
EF1	Minor structural and roof damage occurred to several residences and minor to moderate tree damage occurred.							
EF1	NE of Palo Alto to SE of Prairie	Clay, Monroe	MS	33.70°N 88.76°W	00:12–00:25	8.9 mi (14.3 km)	200 yd (180 m)	$220,000
EF1	One structure sustained roof damage and minor to moderate tree damage occurred.							
EF2	NNW of Belgreen to NW of Littleville	Franklin, Colbert	AL	34.5415°N 87.9038°W	01:05–01:23	10.87 mi (17.49 km)	100 yd (91 m)	Unknown
EF2	The tornado touched down on the northeast side of the Cedar Creek Reservoir, where a home lost a significant amount of roofing material and was shifted on its foundation, injuring the one occupant, and some power poles were snapped. Farther along the path, a single-wide manufactured home had its roof and walls destroyed, where two people were injured, another manufactured home was damaged, and a home had its roof uplifted. Many trees were also snapped along the path.							
EF1	NE of Ethelsville to S of Millport	Pickens	AL	33.4521°N 88.1502°W	01:15–01:25	5.3 mi (8.5 km)	600 yd (550 m)	$0
EF1	Numerous trees were snapped or uprooted along the path, and several outbuildings were either damaged or destroyed.							
EF0	N of Gu-Win to NNE of Brilliant	Marion	AL	34.0002°N 87.8754°W	01:29–01:43	10.6 mi (17.1 km)	150 yd (140 m)	$0
EF0	Trees and small outhouses were damaged along the 10 1/2 Mile path. Ping Pong Ball sized hail was also reported with this cell on AL-253, inflicting minor damage to shed-tops and shingles.							
EF1	E of Haleyville	Winston	AL	34.2498°N 87.5383°W	02:04–02:06	0.4 mi (0.64 km)	100 yd (91 m)	$0
EF1	One home sustained roof damage, a metal pole barn was destroyed with debris scattered across a field, and several power poles were snapped. One garage sustained minor roof damage, some garage doors were blown in, and trees were blown down or snapped.							
EF0	SE of Hubbertville	Fayette	AL	33.7722°N 87.6959°W	02:06–02:07	0.3 mi (0.48 km)	50 yd (46 m)	$0
EF0	Brief touchdown occurred along Alabama Highway 102 which knocked down some trees and did minor roof damage to an outbuilding.							
EF2	NW of Double Springs	Winston	AL	34.1946°N 87.4701°W	02:06–02:12	3.2 mi (5.1 km)	300 yd (270 m)	$0
EF2	Two mobile homes and an outbuilding were completely destroyed, some homes and other structures were damaged, and a chicken house was heavily damaged. A car was moved 20 feet, and a truck was rolled 50 yards. Numerous trees were blown down, snapped, or uprooted, and many power poles were blown down as well.							
EF1	SE of Bent Oak to SSW of Columbus	Lowndes	MS	33.404°N 88.4813°W	02:12–02:19	3.48 mi (5.60 km)	100 yd (91 m)	$50,000
EF1	A farm pivot was heavily damaged and minor to moderate tree damage occurred.							
EF3	N of Danville to NE of Neel	Morgan	AL	34.4406°N 87.0913°W	02:40–02:48	6.2 mi (10.0 km)	175 yd (160 m)	Unknown
EF3	Frame homes had their roofs ripped off, one of which had a wall blown out. Mobile homes were destroyed with debris scattered up to 100 yards away, outbuildings and chicken houses were destroyed, and metal industrial buildings were severely damaged. The Neel Volunteer Fire Department building lost much of its roof, with large metal girders bent. A motorcycle shop was leveled with motorcycles thrown and destroyed, and a nearby car was rolled 75 yards. Steel beams from the shop were thrown 400 yards into a house, severely damaging it. A convenience store was also damaged, and many trees and power poles were snapped.							
EF2	SSE of Arley to SSW of Jones Chapel	Winston, Cullman	AL	34.0699°N 87.2016°W	02:52–03:07	9.51 mi (15.30 km)	1,000 yd (910 m)	Unknown
EF2	Four homes were destroyed, at least a dozen other homes sustained structural damage, and several sheds and outbuildings were damaged by this high-end EF2 wedge tornado. A 1/4 mile (0.40 km) stretch of concrete power poles were snapped and numerous trees were snapped or uprooted. A fire department training building was destroyed in Helicon. In Cullman County, the tornado caused significant damage to a barn, destroyed a shed, and snapped some trees before dissipating.							
EF1	W of Tullahoma to SW of Manchester	Coffee	TN	35.3584°N 86.2447°W	03:05–03:15	7.99 mi (12.86 km)	300 yd (270 m)	$750,000
EF1	Several businesses sustained roof damage in Tullahoma, and hundreds of trees were downed in residential areas, many of which landed on homes. One person was injured when a tree fell on their car.							
EF1	ESE of Manchester	Coffee	TN	35.4572°N 86.0559°W	03:24–03:29	3.51 mi (5.65 km)	200 yd (180 m)	$250,000
EF1	A log cabin style home was moved 6–8 ft (1.8–2.4 m) off its foundation, although it was not properly attached, and several barns and outbuildings were heavily damaged. Several dozen trees were snapped and uprooted as well.							
EF2	Eastern Huntsville to N of Princeton	Madison, Jackson	AL	34.74°N 86.53°W	03:29–04:00	19.85 mi (31.95 km)	150 yd (140 m)	Unknown
EF2	Numerous trees were snapped at Monte Sano Mountain near the beginning of the path before the tornado passed through multiple residential subdivisions and damaged numerous homes, a few of which had their roofs ripped off. A horse riding arena and several outbuildings were destroyed, and many more trees and power poles were snapped further along the path before the tornado dissipated near Putman Mountain.							
EF1	ENE of Estillfork to W of Hytop	Jackson	AL	34.92°N 86.14°W	04:02–04:07	0.9 mi (1.4 km)	40 yd (37 m)	$0
EF1	Some pine trees were snapped.							
EF1	SSE of Addison to SW of Jones Chapel	Winston, Cullman	AL	34.1550°N 87.1572°W	04:05–04:25	3.15 mi (5.07 km)	100 yd (91 m)	Unknown
EF1	A mobile home was rolled over and destroyed, a house sustained roof damage, a garage was significantly damaged, and a carport was damaged as well. Several other structures including barns and sheds were also damaged. Numerous trees and tree limbs were snapped along the path.							
EF1	WNW of Higdon to SSW of Bryant	Jackson	AL	34.87°N 85.71°W	05:00–05:03	2.31 mi (3.72 km)	150 yd (140 m)	$0
EF1	Softwood trees and large branches were snapped.							
EF2	NNE of Whitwell to SE of Dunlap	Marion, Sequatchie	TN	35.2481°N 85.4459°W	05:03–05:12	8.15 mi (13.12 km)	350 yd (320 m)	Unknown
EF2	This high-end EF2 tornado touched down in northern Marion County, and strengthened as it crossed into Sequatchie County. A double-wide mobile home was completely destroyed and the roof of a church was heavily damaged. A grove of trees were nearly all snapped halfway up the trunk, and a two-story family home on a farm sustained significant damage, losing its roof and several exterior walls. Farther along the path, two more homes were heavily damaged before the tornado lifted. Two people were injured.							
EF1	NW of Union Grove	Marshall	AL	34.4315°N 86.5032°W	05:05–05:11	1.2 mi (1.9 km)	50 yd (46 m)	Unknown
EF1	One home had its roof uplifted and blown into a field, another sustained damage when a RV was flipped into the home, destroying the vehicle, and two homes were damaged by falling trees. A double-wide mobile home sustained minor roof damage, a storage shed had its roof lifted off and trees were snapped or uprooted along the path.							
EF1	WSW of Lamar County Airport to S of Beaverton	Lamar	AL	33.8255°N 88.1623°W	05:40–05:53	9.69 mi (15.59 km)	600 yd (550 m)	$0
EF1	Multiple outbuildings, two hangars, and three small airplanes were destroyed. Several mobile homes and a restaurant were damaged to a lesser degree, and numerous trees and tree limbs were snapped.							

=== November 30 event ===
List of confirmed tornadoes – Wednesday, November 30, 2016
EF#	Location	County / Parish	State	Start Coord.	Time (UTC)	Path length	Max width	Damage (2016 USD)
EF1	SE of Guin to W of Natural Bridge	Marion	AL	33.9518°N 87.9005°W	06:01–06:24	16.85 mi (27.12 km)	900 yd (820 m)	Unknown
EF1	Homes and mobile homes sustained minor damage, and many trees and tree limbs were snapped along the path. Outbuildings were impacted as well, including a barn that was heavily damaged. A restaurant between Guin and Gu-Win sustained significant roof damage.							
EF3	SW of Rosalie to NW of Rising Fawn, GA	Jackson, DeKalb	AL	34.69°N 85.78°W	06:02–06:20	13.48 mi (21.69 km)	206 yd (188 m)	Unknown
EF3	4 deaths – In Rosalie, a poorly constructed shopping plaza collapsed, frame homes and other structures were heavily damaged, and a church and several mobile homes were destroyed. The most severe damage occurred to the north of Ider, where a daycare center was swept clean from its foundation. Surveyors noted that the structure's base plating was rotted from termites. Elsewhere along the path, frame homes sustained significant roof and exterior wall loss, mobile homes and chicken houses were destroyed with debris scattered downwind, and a large metal industrial building was heavily damaged. Barns and outbuildings were destroyed, and numerous trees and power poles were snapped. Three fatalities occurred when a mobile home was obliterated, and another person later died of their injuries. Nine other people were injured.							
EF2	SSW of Athens to E of Niota	McMinn	TN	35.4046°N 84.6371°W	06:20–06:30	11.33 mi (18.23 km)	200 yd (180 m)	Unknown
EF2	This high-end EF2 tornado caused significant damage to homes and businesses in Athens, including a Save-A-Lot store that was partially destroyed. A covered walkway was destroyed, and four buildings were heavily damaged while another was destroyed at a large church complex. Numerous manufactured homes were destroyed in the Deerfield Estates subdivision, a few of which were obliterated. Many trees and power lines were downed along the path and 20 people were injured.							
EF0	NE of Ringgold	Catoosa	GA	34.9393°N 85.1015°W	06:56–06:58	1.29 mi (2.08 km)	225 yd (206 m)	$50,000
EF0	Homes sustained roof, siding, and garage door damage with debris scattered up to 500 yards away. Several trees were downed as well.							
EF3	SSW of Ocoee to SW of Benton	Polk	TN	35.1109°N 84.7264°W	07:28–07:33	4.6 mi (7.4 km)	155 yd (142 m)	Unknown
EF3	2 deaths – The tornado touched down south of Ocoee before moving into town, heavily damaging several structures and snapping many trees. The brick Ocoee post office building had its roof torn off and exterior walls collapsed, and several manufactured homes were destroyed. A fire station sustained loss of its roof and collapse of its cinder block walls. A cell phone tower and a metal truss tower were toppled over as well. The two fatalities occurred in a manufactured home. The tornado weakened and snapped off the tops of several pine trees before lifting near Benton. 20 other people were injured.							
EF0	SE of Hytop to WNW of Stevenson	Jackson	AL	34.87°N 85.99°W	08:11–08:17	3.4 mi (5.5 km)	30 yd (27 m)	Unknown
EF0	A large farm shed sustained roof damage and tree damage occurred, with numerous large tree branches damaged.							
EF1	WSW of Faunsdale to SSE of Newbern	Marengo, Hale	AL	32.4233°N 87.6657°W	11:10–11:32	12.93 mi (20.81 km)	250 yd (230 m)	$0
EF1	Many trees were snapped and uprooted along the path.							
EF0	Westwego	Jefferson	LA	29.9096°N 90.1428°W	14:45–14:47	0.76 mi (1.22 km)	30 yd (27 m)	Unknown
EF0	A weak tornado struck Westwego, damaging the roofs of five homes, and tearing the carport off of another. Tree limbs were snapped, a power pole was bent over, and a warehouse sustained roof and garage door damage.							
EF0	Mary Esther	Okaloosa	FL	30.4105°N 86.6812°W	16:38–16:40	0.77 mi (1.24 km)	175 yd (160 m)	$50,000
EF0	This tornado began as a waterspout before moving ashore. A house had part of its overhanging roof ripped off, while another sustained significant damage to a sunroom. Sporadic tree and power line damage occurred as well.							
EF0	W of Bowdon Junction to SE of Bremen	Carroll	GA	33.6646°N 85.1613°W	17:53–17:58	4.02 mi (6.47 km)	100 yd (91 m)	$8,000
EF0	Several trees were snapped or uprooted and tree limbs were downed.							
EF1	E of Camp Hill to E of Waverly	Lee, Chambers	AL	32.7056°N 85.5591°W	18:35–18:40	3.22 mi (5.18 km)	300 yd (270 m)	$0
EF1	Minor structural damage occurred and many trees were snapped and uprooted.							
EF1	Southeastern Mableton	Cobb	GA	33.7786°N 84.5406°W	18:39–18:41	0.46 mi (0.74 km)	100 yd (91 m)	$50,000
EF1	Part of a metal warehouse building was heavily damaged, with metal siding and roofing scattered up to a quarter-mile away. A tractor-trailer was flipped over onto its side, trees were snapped and uprooted, and a metal light pole was snapped. Part of a wooden power pole was pulled out of the ground as well.							
EF1	Northern Atlanta	Fulton	GA	33.8376°N 84.4277°W	18:50–18:54	1.9 mi (3.1 km)	100 yd (91 m)	$25,000
EF1	Numerous trees were snapped along the path.							
EF0	Eastern Alpharetta to N of Johns Creek	Fulton, Forsyth	GA	34.0905°N 84.2336°W	19:07–19:13	2.93 mi (4.72 km)	100 yd (91 m)	$16,000
EF0	Several trees were snapped or uprooted and a traffic light was damaged.							
EF1	NNW of Commerce	Jackson, Banks	GA	34.2322°N 83.5025°W	20:04–20:11	2.8 mi (4.5 km)	100 yd (91 m)	$65,000
EF1	Poultry feed bins were moved and tree limbs were downed. Two street signs were bent over, two large overhead garage doors were blown in at a trailer sales business. This structure also sustained roof damage and had its front door ripped off, and several automotive trailers were rolled about 50 feet. Several large business signs were blown out before the tornado dissipated.							
EF1	Simpsonville	Greenville	SC	34.678°N 82.378°W	21:41–22:02	16.44 mi (26.46 km)	150 yd (140 m)	$500,000
EF1	This rain-wrapped, high-end EF1 tornado damaged numerous homes in Simpsonville, some significantly. Sheds, greenhouses, garages and outbuildings were damaged or destroyed. Mobile homes were also damaged, and many power lines, trees, and tree limbs were downed, some of which landed on homes.							
EF1	NW of Pineville	Mecklenburg	NC	35.124°N 80.953°W	23:26–23:29	2.37 mi (3.81 km)	150 yd (140 m)	$100,000
EF1	Numerous trees were downed, a mobile home was shifted off its foundation, and a tractor trailer was overturned. Various buildings, including a few homes, sustained minor damage mainly in the form of siding and shingle removal.							

== December ==
Confirmed tornadoes by Enhanced Fujita rating
EFU	EF0	EF1	EF2	EF3	EF4	EF5	Total
0	14	5	0	0	0	0	19

=== December 5 event ===
List of confirmed tornadoes – Monday, December 5, 2016
EF#	Location	County / Parish	State	Start Coord.	Time (UTC)	Path length	Max width	Damage (2016 USD)
EF1	NNE of Gonzales	Ascension	LA	30.2695°N 90.8874°W	17:47–17:53	3.4 mi (5.5 km)	30 yd (27 m)	$0
EF1	Trees were snapped or uprooted; fallen trees caused minor structural damage. Power lines and power poles were damaged.							

=== December 13 event ===
List of confirmed tornadoes – Tuesday, December 13, 2016
EF#	Location	County / Parish	State	Start Coord.	Time (UTC)	Path length	Max width	Damage (2016 USD)
EF0	N of Kiln	Hancock, Harrison	MS	30.5158°N 89.3681°W	21:19–21:27	4.32 mi (6.95 km)	20 yd (18 m)	$0
EF0	Intermittent tree damage was observed. A small section of roofing was peeled from one mobile home, and two others sustained damage as well.							

=== December 17 event ===
List of confirmed tornadoes – Saturday, December 17, 2016
EF#	Location	County / Parish	State	Start Coord.	Time (UTC)	Path length	Max width	Damage (2016 USD)
EF1	NE of Grapevine	Grant	AR	34.2187°N 92.2704°W	01:03–01:05	0.48 mi (0.77 km)	100 yd (91 m)	$100,000
EF1	A double-wide mobile home was severely damaged, a few other structures sustained minor damage, and several hardwood trees were snapped.							
EF0	WNW of Cherokee	Colbert	AL	34.82°N 88.08°W	05:37–05:38	0.62 mi (1.00 km)	87 yd (80 m)	Unknown
EF0	Numerous softwood trees were snapped or uprooted.							
EF1	NW of Vardaman	Calhoun	MS	33.9239°N 89.2228°W	05:45–05:46	0.35 mi (0.56 km)	75 yd (69 m)	$80,000
EF1	A private business, a metal building, and small trailers were damaged.							

=== December 18 event ===
List of confirmed tornadoes – Sunday, December 18, 2016
EF#	Location	County / Parish	State	Start Coord.	Time (UTC)	Path length	Max width	Damage (2016 USD)
EF0	Vina	Franklin	AL	34.3751°N 88.0719°W	06:42–06:46	0.97 mi (1.56 km)	75 yd (69 m)	Unknown
EF0	One home sustained roof damage. The athletic fields of Vina High School sustained damage to the fences; a baseball dugout was destroyed. Several large unanchored objects were tossed, the school sustained roof damage in several locales, and windows were blown out. Awnings connecting different portions of the school were destroyed. Shingles were ripped from another building.							

=== December 25 event ===
List of confirmed tornadoes – Sunday, December 25, 2016
EF#	Location	County / Parish	State	Start Coord.	Time (UTC)	Path length	Max width	Damage (2016 USD)
EF0	S of Kismet	Seward	KS	37.1597°N 100.6967°W	14:55–14:56	0.65 mi (1.05 km)	25 yd (23 m)	Unknown
EF0	The roof of a building was severely damaged in a hog finishing farm.							
EF0	E of Ensign	Ford	KS	37.6199°N 101.1431°W	15:44–15:51	5.79 mi (9.32 km)	40 yd (37 m)	Unknown
EF0	A road maintainer and an outbuilding were damaged.							
EF0	E of Bucklin	Ford, Kiowa	KS	37.4969°N 99.5583°W	16:30–16:35	3.17 mi (5.10 km)	30 yd (27 m)	$0
EF0	A wind shelter for cattle was overturned, a large cattle barn or quonset was damaged, and several feed bunks were rolled or tossed. Large round hay bales were rolled 50 yd (46 m). A 30 yd (27 m) stretch of fencing was broken.							
EF0	S of Greensburg	Kiowa	KS	37.5116°N 99.3277°W	16:51–16:59	6.34 mi (10.20 km)	30 yd (27 m)	Unknown
EF0	A small shed was destroyed, with debris carried 100 yd (91 m), and trees were damaged.							
EF0	SE of Nekoma	Rush	KS	38.3995°N 99.3807°W	16:54–16:55	1.15 mi (1.85 km)	30 yd (27 m)	Unknown
EF0	Trained storm spotter reported a brief tornado.							
EF0	S of Wilmore	Comanche	KS	37.3021°N 99.2417°W	16:58–17:00	1.88 mi (3.03 km)	50 yd (46 m)	$85,000
EF0	An irrigation sprinkler was overturned.							
EF0	NW of Alton	Osborne	KS	39.503°N 99.0182°W	17:45–17:48	1.87 mi (3.01 km)	50 yd (46 m)	$5,000
EF0	An empty bulk bin was tipped over, a home sustained very minor damage, and trees were damaged.							
EF1	SE of Funk	Phelps	NE	40.4216°N 99.2467°W	17:50–17:53	2.75 mi (4.43 km)	200 yd (180 m)	$375,000
EF1	Several center pivots were upset, trees were damaged, and six power poles were snapped.							
EF0	SW of Norman	Kearney	NE	40.4255°N 98.857°W	18:16–18:18	0.51 mi (0.82 km)	50 yd (46 m)	$5,000
EF0	A farmstead sustained minor damage.							
EF0	NE of Kearney	Buffalo	NE	40.7708°N 98.9236°W	18:24–18:28	4.18 mi (6.73 km)	50 yd (46 m)	$225,000
EF0	A couple of irrigation pivots were upset, and an outbuilding was destroyed, with debris tossed 0.25 mi (0.40 km).							
EF0	NE of Salina	Saline	KS	38.9351°N 97.4384°W	19:53–19:54	0.13 mi (0.21 km)	40 yd (37 m)	$0
EF0	A barn roof and trees were damaged.							

=== December 26 event ===
List of confirmed tornadoes – Monday, December 26, 2016
EF#	Location	County / Parish	State	Start Coord.	Time (UTC)	Path length	Max width	Damage (2016 USD)
EF0	NW of Benton	Marshall	KY	36.9449°N 88.446°W	21:08–21:10	1.44 mi (2.32 km)	40 yd (37 m)	$4,000
EF0	Several trees were uprooted while one was topped and another was snapped. A house sustained soffit damage, and a number of shingles were blown off an outbuilding.							

=== December 29 event ===
List of confirmed tornadoes – Thursday, December 29, 2016
EF#	Location	County / Parish	State	Start Coord.	Time (UTC)	Path length	Max width	Damage (2016 USD)
EF1	S of Jefferson	Jackson	GA	34.1078°N 83.5913°W	08:50–09:00	3.49 mi (5.62 km)	250 yd (230 m)	$50,000
EF1	Numerous trees were snapped or uprooted. A small storage shed was overturned and several homes sustained minor damage.							

== See also ==
- Tornadoes of 2016
- List of United States tornadoes from June to August 2016
