= List of United States tornadoes from June to August 2016 =

This is a list of all tornadoes that were confirmed by local offices of the National Weather Service in the United States in June to August 2016.

== United States yearly total ==
Confirmed tornadoes by Enhanced Fujita rating
EFU	EF0	EF1	EF2	EF3	EF4	EF5	Total
30	530	311	75	26	2	0	974

== June ==
Confirmed tornadoes by Enhanced Fujita rating
EFU	EF0	EF1	EF2	EF3	EF4	EF5	Total
4	52	23	7	1	0	0	87

=== June 1 event ===
List of confirmed tornadoes – Wednesday, June 1, 2016 (Note: All dates are based on the local time zone where the tornado touched down; however, all times are in Coordinated Universal Time for consistency.)
EF#	Location	County / Parish	State	Start Coord.	Time (UTC)	Path length	Max width	Damage (2016 USD)
EFU	SW of Meadow	Terry	TX	33.3092°N 102.2315°W	1620–1621	0.04 mi (0.064 km)	40 yd (37 m)	$0
EFU	A motorist photographed a brief tornado.							
EF0	SW of Juniata	Adams	NE	40.5549°N 98.5551°W	2128–2129	0.02 mi (0.032 km)	25 yd (23 m)	$2,000
EF0	A roof was partially torn off a metal outbuilding.							
EF0	SW of Highland Park	Polk	FL	27.852°N 81.576°W	2245–2254	0.7 mi (1.1 km)	30 yd (27 m)	$5,000
EF0	A few trees were downed and two power poles sustained damage.							

=== June 3 event ===
List of confirmed tornadoes – Friday, June 3, 2016
EF#	Location	County / Parish	State	Start Coord.	Time (UTC)	Path length	Max width	Damage (2016 USD)
EF0	ENE of Spring Hill	Stearns	MN	45.5488°N 94.808°W	2208–2215	2.31 mi (3.72 km)	50 yd (46 m)	$500,000
EF0	Portions of tin roofing was removed from several turkey barns, and several large trees were severed.							
EF0	ENE of Cazenovia	Pipestone	MN	44.1°N 96.3105°W	2235–2236	0.05 mi (0.080 km)	25 yd (23 m)	$0
EF0	Law enforcement reported a brief landspout tornado.							

=== June 4 event ===
List of confirmed tornadoes – Saturday, June 4, 2016
EF#	Location	County / Parish	State	Start Coord.	Time (UTC)	Path length	Max width	Damage (2016 USD)
EF0	S of Daleville	Delaware	IN	40.0856°N 85.5678°W	2120–2121	0.02 mi (0.032 km)	40 yd (37 m)	$1,000
EF0	Large tree branches were downed, and a homestead sustained minor damage.							
EF0	Northeastern Columbus	Franklin	OH	40.0346°N 82.9488°W	2206–2210	0.3 mi (0.48 km)	135 yd (123 m)	$100,000
EF0	One home's garage was damaged, with the garage doors destroyed and walls experiencing significant damage. Shutter, roof, and siding damage occurred to many homes, and large tree branches were snapped off.							
EF0	S of Webster	Wayne	IN	39.8822°N 84.9612°W	2225–2230	1.4 mi (2.3 km)	150 yd (140 m)	$40,000
EF0	A barn had a section of its roof measuring about 45 by 20 ft (13.7 by 6.1 m) removed, about ten residences sustained minor damage to shingles, wood fences and siding, and a small shed measuring about 12 ft (3.7 m) on each side was destroyed. A small barn had its slate roofing material strewn across a field, many trees and tree limbs were broken, and one large tree was snapped. Plant material from the previous growing season was moved and some of it was plastered onto one side of a large shed.							
EF0	WNW of Cecil	Shawano	WI	44.83°N 88.5096°W	0000–0001	0.01 mi (0.016 km)	50 yd (46 m)	$0
EF0	Very weak landspout tornado briefly occurred over Loon Lake.							

=== June 5 event ===
List of confirmed tornadoes – Sunday, June 5, 2016
EF#	Location	County / Parish	State	Start Coord.	Time (UTC)	Path length	Max width	Damage (2016 USD)
EF1	North Warren	Warren	PA	41.8659°N 79.1605°W	2100–2102	0.79 mi (1.27 km)	120 yd (110 m)	$100,000
EF1	A guest house near Conewango Creek was destroyed and a house and a garage were damaged by falling trees. Other homes sustained damage to windows, siding, and flashing, and numerous trees were snapped or uprooted.							

=== June 6 event ===
List of confirmed tornadoes – Monday, June 6, 2016
EF#	Location	County / Parish	State	Start Coord.	Time (UTC)	Path length	Max width	Damage (2016 USD)
EF1	Western Jacksonville	Duval	FL	30.2727°N 81.8317°W	1925–1935	3.89 mi (6.26 km)	180 yd (160 m)	Unknown
EF1	Empty trucks were flipped at a Publix distribution center, and about a dozen homes sustained damage to roofs and windows. Many trees were snapped, uprooted, or had branches broken off, and some fences were blown over.							

=== June 8 event ===
List of confirmed tornadoes – Wednesday, June 8, 2016
EF#	Location	County / Parish	State	Start Coord.	Time (UTC)	Path length	Max width	Damage (2016 USD)
EF0	SW of Waterman	Wheeler	OR	44.54°N 119.95°W	0322–0323	0.21 mi (0.34 km)	50 yd (46 m)	$0
EF0	A potential tornado was recorded on a cell phone.							

=== June 10 event ===
List of confirmed tornadoes – Friday, June 10, 2016
EF#	Location	County / Parish	State	Start Coord.	Time (UTC)	Path length	Max width	Damage (2016 USD)
EF0	SW of Mackville	Outagamie	WI	44.3395°N 88.4412°W	0200–0203	1.42 mi (2.29 km)	25 yd (23 m)	$0
EF0	A brief, weak tornado caused damage to tree branches.							

=== June 11 event ===
List of confirmed tornadoes – Saturday, June 11, 2016
EF#	Location	County / Parish	State	Start Coord.	Time (UTC)	Path length	Max width	Damage (2016 USD)
EF3	Baker	Fallon	MT	46.31°N 104.25°W	0054–0104	3 mi (4.8 km)	200 yd (180 m)	$1,500,000
EF3	A steel-framed barn and three RVs were destroyed, several homes sustained minor damage, and several horses were killed south of Baker. The tornado then tracked north into Baker and stalled for a short time over a subdivision before dissipating over Baker Lake. About six homes were destroyed and more than 50 homes were damaged in Baker, and many trees were snapped, denuded, and stripped of foliage. Six people were injured.							

=== June 13 event ===
List of confirmed tornadoes – Monday, June 13, 2016
EF#	Location	County / Parish	State	Start Coord.	Time (UTC)	Path length	Max width	Damage (2016 USD)
EFU	NW of Trinchera	Las Animas	CO	37.18°N 104.21°W	1941–1958	2.84 mi (4.57 km)	200 yd (180 m)	$0
EFU	Storm chasers captured photos and videos of a tornado that remained over open country, causing no damage.							
EF2	N of Hermosa	Pennington	SD	43.8634°N 103.2461°W	2222–2234	7.42 mi (11.94 km)	200 yd (180 m)	$100,000
EF2	Several homes were badly damaged and outbuildings were destroyed in a subdivision, and several power poles and numerous pine trees were snapped.							
EF0	SSW of Belleville	St. Clair	IL	38.4646°N 90.0069°W	2230–2233	0.41 mi (0.66 km)	25 yd (23 m)	$0
EF0	A brief landspout tornado touched down in an open field, causing no damage.							
EF0	NE of Adena	Morgan	CO	40.09°N 103.79°W	2324	0.1 mi (0.16 km)	50 yd (46 m)	$0
EF0	A member of the public reported a brief tornado.							
EF0	E of Berwick	St. Mary	LA	29.71°N 91.15°W	2335	0.01 mi (0.016 km)	5 yd (4.6 m)	$0
EF0	A brief waterspout was observed on Lake Palourde.							
EF0	NNW of Lake Meredith	Moore	TX	35.788°N 101.747°W	0106–0111	0.3 mi (0.48 km)	50 yd (46 m)	$0
EF0	A brief tornado caused a narrow swath of tree damage, with numerous tree limbs broken and one tree uprooted.							
EF2	N of Pantex Plant	Potter, Carson	TX	35.428°N 101.643°W	0125–0137	4.17 mi (6.71 km)	100 yd (91 m)	Unknown
EF2	A well-anchored double-wide mobile home was rolled and damaged, a home had part of its metal roof removed, and a concrete block garage was destroyed. Trees were snapped at their trunks and a power pole was snapped as well.							

=== June 14 event ===
List of confirmed tornadoes – Tuesday, June 14, 2016
EF#	Location	County / Parish	State	Start Coord.	Time (UTC)	Path length	Max width	Damage (2016 USD)
EF0	WNW of Pipestone	Pipestone	MN	43.9812°N 96.3452°W	1852–1902	3.78 mi (6.08 km)	20 yd (18 m)	$0
EF0	A pole barn was damaged and corn was flattened in a field.							
EF0	S of Lake Park	Dickinson	IA	43.35°N 95.3205°W	1922–1923	0.36 mi (0.58 km)	25 yd (23 m)	$1,000
EF0	A brief tornado damaged a small shed.							
EF0	WNW of Webster	Day	SD	45.3517°N 97.6220°W	1942–1947	1.69 mi (2.72 km)	10 yd (9.1 m)	$0
EF0	Tornado touched down over a lake and broke large tree branches in a tree grove before dissipating.							
EF0	S of Waubay	Day	SD	45.2872°N 97.3168°W	2014–2018	2.02 mi (3.25 km)	10 yd (9.1 m)	$0
EF0	Tornado remained over Bitter Lake, causing no damage.							
EF0	W of Vernon Center	Blue Earth	MN	43.9589°N 94.2033°W	2034–2035	0.22 mi (0.35 km)	25 yd (23 m)	$0
EF0	A brief tornado was videoed in an open field.							
EF0	E of Waterville	Le Sueur, Rice	MN	44.1973°N 93.5417°W	2105–2114	2.18 mi (3.51 km)	25 yd (23 m)	$0
EF0	A few trees were downed and tree limbs broken.							
EF0	W of Corona to SE of Wilmot	Grant, Roberts	SD	45.3261°N 96.8461°W	2114–2130	5.43 mi (8.74 km)	15 yd (14 m)	Unknown
EF0	A tree and fence posts were snapped on a farmstead and minor crop damage occurred.							
EF0	N of Morristown	Rice	MN	44.3134°N 93.4661°W	2128–2129	0.34 mi (0.55 km)	25 yd (23 m)	$0
EF0	Nearly a dozen trees were snapped.							
EF0	SE of Eagle Lake	Blue Earth	MN	44.1282°N 93.8622°W	2133–2136	2.13 mi (3.43 km)	20 yd (18 m)	$0
EF0	A number of trees were broken.							
EF0	SE of Beardsley	Big Stone	MN	45.51°N 96.64°W	2210–2211	0.07 mi (0.11 km)	10 yd (9.1 m)	$0
EF0	Thin rope tornado briefly touched down, causing no damage.							
EF0	WNW of Urbana	Benton	IA	42.25°N 91.95°W	2216–2217	0.17 mi (0.27 km)	10 yd (9.1 m)	$0
EF0	Brief tornado was confirmed by video and caused no damage.							
EF0	W of Barry	Big Stone	MN	45.56°N 96.60°W	2226–2229	0.84 mi (1.35 km)	10 yd (9.1 m)	$0
EF0	A tornado touched down west of Barry, causing no damage.							
EF0	NNE of Barry	Traverse	MN	45.61°N 96.53°W	2250–2251	0.13 mi (0.21 km)	10 yd (9.1 m)	$0
EF0	Brief tornado touched down, causing no damage.							
EF0	SW of Bradford	Stark	IL	41.1595°N 89.7102°W	0015–0016	0.07 mi (0.11 km)	10 yd (9.1 m)	$0
EF0	A trained storm spotter reported a brief tornado.							

=== June 15 event ===
List of confirmed tornadoes – Wednesday, June 15, 2016
EF#	Location	County / Parish	State	Start Coord.	Time (UTC)	Path length	Max width	Damage (2016 USD)
EFU	NW of Stockbridge	Calumet	WI	44.1085°N 88.3383°W	2347–2349	0.69 mi (1.11 km)	25 yd (23 m)	$0
EFU	A brief, weak waterspout formed on Lake Winnebago.							

=== June 16 event ===
List of confirmed tornadoes – Thursday, June 16, 2016
EF#	Location	County / Parish	State	Start Coord.	Time (UTC)	Path length	Max width	Damage (2016 USD)
EF0	N of Bellegrove, MD	Fulton	PA	39.7397°N 78.3438°W	1935	0.11 mi (0.18 km)	50 yd (46 m)	$1,000
EF0	Trees were snapped and uprooted in multiple directions.							
EF0	WSW of Dunbar	Fayette	PA	39.9632°N 79.6793°W	2042–2043	0.4 mi (0.64 km)	200 yd (180 m)	$15,000
EF0	Over 80 trees were downed and uprooted, two of which fell on a home.							
EF0	WNW of Westover	Monongalia	WV	39.6498°N 80.0719°W	2049–2050	0.16 mi (0.26 km)	350 yd (320 m)	$7,000
EF0	A residence had several windows blown out and most of its shingles removed, and hardwood trees were snapped and uprooted.							

=== June 19 event ===
List of confirmed tornadoes – Sunday, June 19, 2016
EF#	Location	County / Parish	State	Start Coord.	Time (UTC)	Path length	Max width	Damage (2016 USD)
EF1	SSE of Roosevelt	Roseau	MN	48.6°N 94.99°W	1300–1306	2.74 mi (4.41 km)	400 yd (370 m)	$0
EF1	A swath of trees were downed.							
EF0	NNE of Roseau	Roseau	MN	48.91°N 95.72°W	2322	0.25 mi (0.40 km)	20 yd (18 m)	$0
EF0	A trained storm spotter reported a brief tornado.							
EF0	N of Staples	Wadena, Cass	MN	46.5°N 94.79°W	2329–2332	2.33 mi (3.75 km)	100 yd (91 m)	$0
EF0	Law enforcement and emergency management reported a brief tornado.							
EF1	NE of Jacobson to SE of Wawina	Aitkin, Itasca	MN	47.0188°N 93.2464°W	2349–2359	8.12 mi (13.07 km)	440 yd (400 m)	Unknown
EF1	A house was destroyed and had its roof lofted, several pole barns were destroyed, and EF1 damage occurred to several stands of trees.							
EF1	ESE of Little Swan to SE of Zim	St. Louis	MN	47.2785°N 92.7227°W	0006–0017	7.23 mi (11.64 km)	250 yd (230 m)	Unknown
EF1	A house had its roof partially uplifted, with roofing materials lofted up to 380 yd (350 m). A decorative windmill was flattened, a flagpole was bent, and tree damage occurred along the path, with sporadic pockets of low-end EF1 damage.							
EF2	S of Deerwood	Crow Wing	MN	46.4449°N 93.9158°W	0011–0019	3.52 mi (5.66 km)	730 yd (670 m)	Unknown
EF2	A manufactured home and trees on the west and southeast sides of Placid Lake sustained EF2 damage, and extensive tree damage occurred elsewhere. Two people were injured in the manufactured home.							

=== June 21 event ===
List of confirmed tornadoes – Tuesday, June 21, 2016
EF#	Location	County / Parish	State	Start Coord.	Time (UTC)	Path length	Max width	Damage (2016 USD)
EF0	SW of Lisbon to W of Ellicott City	Howard	MD	39.3314°N 77.1119°W	1729–1748	12.64 mi (20.34 km)	500 yd (460 m)	Unknown
EF0	The tornado produced nearly continuous tree damage with fallen trees damaging structures, downing power lines, and blocking roads. Most structural damage was from falling trees but a few structures suffered minor roof damage from the wind and several small outbuildings were damaged or destroyed. A large garage had its doors bowed inward.							
EF1	ENE of Richwood	Nicholas, Greenbrier	WV	38.2697°N 80.5038°W	1900–1909	5.39 mi (8.67 km)	300 yd (270 m)	$50,000
EF1	Hundreds of trees were snapped and uprooted in both Nicholas and Greenbrier counties. In Nicholas County, utility poles were snapped and one residence sustained shingle damage.							
EF1	SSW of Mott	Hettinger	ND	46.3101°N 102.4018°W	0110–0120	3.2 mi (5.1 km)	35 yd (32 m)	$230,000
EF1	One house suffered roof damage with extensive damage to nearby trees near the start of the path. Another house had a three stall garage and half of its roof torn away. Windows and broken and vehicles were damaged. Debris was carried up to a mile.							
EF1	E of Philippi	Barbour	WV	39.1559°N 79.9642°W	0130–0132	0.36 mi (0.58 km)	200 yd (180 m)	$20,000
EF1	A home had siding torn off and thrown about 100 ft (30 m) and a few flatbed trailers flipped. Eight utility poles were downed, several trees were snapped, and a branch penetrated the roof of a home.							
EF0	ESE of Arnegard	McKenzie	ND	47.81°N 103.38°W	0246–0249	0.4 mi (0.64 km)	20 yd (18 m)	$230,000
EF0	Law enforcement reported a tornado.							

=== June 22 event ===
List of confirmed tornadoes – Wednesday, June 22, 2016
EF#	Location	County / Parish	State	Start Coord.	Time (UTC)	Path length	Max width	Damage (2016 USD)
EF1	WNW of West Brooklyn to NW of Compton	Lee	IL	41.6989°N 89.1684°W	0019–0035	4.1 mi (6.6 km)	300 yd (270 m)	Unknown
EF1	A home sustained damage to its roof and garage, trees were downed, snapped, or uprooted, and a shed was damaged. A chicken coop was destroyed, corn was flattened, and another shed sustained minor siding damage.							
EF0	NE of West Brooklyn	Lee	IL	41.7134°N 89.1286°W	0031–0032	0.1 mi (0.16 km)	50 yd (46 m)	Unknown
EF0	Short-lived satellite of the previous tornado, which was confirmed by chaser photo and video. A convergent pattern was observed in vegetation.							
EF0	NNE of Earlville	LaSalle	IL	41.6233°N 88.8999°W	0059–0100	0.3 mi (0.48 km)	75 yd (69 m)	Unknown
EF0	Brief tornado confirmed by chaser video caused damage to corn crops.							
EF1	E of Earlville	LaSalle	IL	41.5960°N 88.9176°W	0059–0109	4.3 mi (6.9 km)	400 yd (370 m)	Unknown
EF1	A home sustained damage to its roof and garage, trees were downed, snapped, or uprooted, and a shed was damaged. A chicken coop was destroyed, corn was flattened, and another shed sustained minor siding damage.							
EF1	NE of Earlville	LaSalle	IL	41.6152°N 88.904°W	0102–0107	1.44 mi (2.32 km)	250 yd (230 m)	$0
EF1	A barn was damaged, a small farm building had its doors collapsed, a tree was snapped, and convergent corn damage occurred.							
EF1	Troy Grove	LaSalle	IL	41.4641°N 89.0885°W	0111–0112	0.5 mi (0.80 km)	50 yd (46 m)	Unknown
EF1	Trees were snapped, uprooted, or had branches broken off throughout town.							
EF1	SSE of Leland	LaSalle	IL	41.563°N 88.7753°W	0122–0127	1.7 mi (2.7 km)	250 yd (230 m)	$0
EF1	A small barn was flipped and destroyed and another had part of its roof removed, and a horse shelter was also destroyed. A small metal truss was flattened, extensive tree damage occurred, and a building sustained minor roof damage.							
EF1	NW of Ottawa	LaSalle	IL	41.414°N 88.9084°W	0132–0133	0.5 mi (0.80 km)	50 yd (46 m)	Unknown
EF1	Brief tornado tipped over a corn dryer.							
EF1	NNE of Ottawa	LaSalle	IL	41.4402°N 88.8712°W	0148–0153	6.7 mi (10.8 km)	100 yd (91 m)	$0
EF1	A small barn had its walls collapsed, large tree branches were broken, and corn crops were damaged.							
EF2	N of Marseilles to NE of Seneca	LaSalle, Grundy	IL	41.3669°N 88.71°W	0153–0215	8.05 mi (12.96 km)	300 yd (270 m)	Unknown
EF2	Four metal truss towers were toppled or crumpled, four residences sustained roof damage, and ten farm buildings were damaged, three of which were destroyed. A silo sustained minor damage, a pole was collapsed, and tree damage occurred along the path. A few homes were damaged, one of which lost part of its roof.							
EF0	ESE of New Bedford	Bureau	IL	41.5052°N 89.6737°W	0204–0205	0.28 mi (0.45 km)	10 yd (9.1 m)	$0
EF0	Very minor damage was observed in a field.							
EF0	NE of Mazon	Grundy	IL	41.266°N 88.3734°W	0229–0236	0.7 mi (1.1 km)	100 yd (91 m)	$0
EF0	Trees were snapped.							
EF1	Malden	Bureau	IL	41.414°N 89.3675°W	0233–0237	0.48 mi (0.77 km)	50 yd (46 m)	$0
EF1	A residence sustained damage to its shingles, several trees were snapped, and crops were damaged.							
EF0	SSW of Van Orin	Bureau	IL	41.516°N 89.3762°W	0240–0243	0.58 mi (0.93 km)	25 yd (23 m)	$0
EF0	Minor damage was observed in fields.							
EF2	N of Graymont to SE of Pontiac	Livingston	IL	40.9183°N 88.7776°W	0306–0324	11.1 mi (17.9 km)	440 yd (400 m)	$0
EF2	Strong tornado clipped the southwestern fringes of Pontiac. A business had its brick exterior walls collapsed and plywood bolted into cement was ripped off, a motel lost some of its roofing, and a single-wide mobile home was pushed off its foundation and destroyed in the southwest part of Pontiac. Wooden power poles were snapped, a barn was destroyed, and tree damage occurred along the path. Four people were injured.							
EF1	WSW of Clifton to N of Ashkum	Iroquois	IL	40.9223°N 87.9891°W	0312–0315	1.7 mi (2.7 km)	50 yd (46 m)	Unknown
EF1	Empty grain bins were tossed and destroyed, knocking down some power poles, and a large trailer was lifted and turned over. Several trees were damaged, corn was flattened, and debris was deposited up to 0.5 mi (0.80 km) away.							
EF0	N of Chatsworth	Livingston	IL	40.7769°N 88.2997°W	0349–0350	0.1 mi (0.16 km)	10 yd (9.1 m)	$0
EF0	Brief tornado removed roof panels and doors from a barn.							
EF1	Northeastern Cissna Park	Iroquois	IL	40.5867°N 87.9016°W	0437–0441	3.1 mi (5.0 km)	440 yd (400 m)	$0
EF1	A house had large sections of its roof removed, wooden power poles were broken, and a small farm building sustained roof damage. The roof of the high school baseball dugout was torn off, and tree damage occurred along the path, with trees snapped, uprooted, and branches broken off.							
EF1	SE of Huntington	Huntington	IN	40.803°N 85.4654°W	0451–0456	2.4 mi (3.9 km)	200 yd (180 m)	$0
EF1	A home and multiple vehicles sustained damage from fallen tree limbs. Additional trees, numerous structures, and some power poles were also impacted.							
EF2	SE of Huntington	Huntington	IN	40.81°N 85.4355°W	0457–0502	2.35 mi (3.78 km)	300 yd (270 m)	$0
EF2	Trees and crops sustained extensive damage, with evidence of a multiple vortex structure. Numerous homes, barns, and outbuildings were also damaged.							

=== June 23 event ===
List of confirmed tornadoes – Thursday, June 23, 2016
EF#	Location	County / Parish	State	Start Coord.	Time (UTC)	Path length	Max width	Damage (2016 USD)
EF1	Waynesville to Wilmington	Warren, Clinton	OH	39.5346°N 84.1141°W	0703–0721	20.7 mi (33.3 km)	250 yd (230 m)	$370,000
EF1	A long-track tornado snapped and uprooted trees and damaged multiple homes and barns. Several barns, silos, and outbuildings were destroyed. A convenience store suffered severe roof damage.							
EF1	W of Washington Court House	Fayette	OH	39.5518°N 83.5538°W	0720–0722	3.8 mi (6.1 km)	300 yd (270 m)	$120,000
EF1	Many trees lost limbs or were snapped. Three houses suffered roof and siding damage with one roof partially uplifted. A garage was destroyed.							
EF1	SW of Kenna	Jackson	WV	38.6488°N 81.6858°W	0907–0908	0.06 mi (0.097 km)	20 yd (18 m)	$20,000
EF1	A brief tornado flipped over a trailer and snapped or uprooted several trees. Two people sustained minor injuries.							
EFU	WNW of Penrose	Fremont	CO	38.4536°N 105.1038°W	1927–1930	0.18 mi (0.29 km)	50 yd (46 m)	$0
EFU	A brief tornado caused no assessable damage.							

=== June 25 event ===
List of confirmed tornadoes – Saturday, June 25, 2016
EF#	Location	County / Parish	State	Start Coord.	Time (UTC)	Path length	Max width	Damage (2016 USD)
EF0	Bogue	Carteret	NC	34.7°N 76.9971°W	1745–1748	0.46 mi (0.74 km)	30 yd (27 m)	$50,000
EF0	A weak landspout or waterspout broke tree limbs and tossed lawn furniture and golf carts, damaging some homes and vehicles. Several mobile homes suffered minor damage with two losing their porch awnings. Several boats on trailers were jackknifed and damaged. One person suffered minor injuries while attempting to save lawn furniture.							

=== June 26 event ===
List of confirmed tornadoes – Sunday, June 26, 2016
EF#	Location	County / Parish	State	Start Coord.	Time (UTC)	Path length	Max width	Damage (2016 USD)
EF1	ESE of Symco to SW of Bear Creek	Waupaca	WI	44.4902°N 88.8254°W	0730–0735	2.7 mi (4.3 km)	100 yd (91 m)	$200,000
EF1	The top of a silo and several farm outbuildings were damaged. Several trees were snapped and uprooted and tree branches were snapped. A manufactured home was pushed off its foundation.							
EF0	W of Sparks	Cook	GA	31.17°N 83.54°W	1745	0.01 mi (0.016 km)	10 yd (9.1 m)	$5,000
EF0	Part of a tree fell on a house.							

=== June 27 event ===
List of confirmed tornadoes – Monday, June 27, 2016
EF#	Location	County / Parish	State	Start Coord.	Time (UTC)	Path length	Max width	Damage (2016 USD)
EF0	S of Flagler	Kit Carson	CO	39.0884°N 103.0725°W	2051–2053	0.01 mi (0.016 km)	25 yd (23 m)	$0
EF0	Photos of a landspout tornado were relayed through social media.							
EF0	SE of Julesburg	Sedgwick	CO	40.9°N 102.16°W	2240	0.01 mi (0.016 km)	25 yd (23 m)	$0
EF0	A storm chaser reported a brief tornado.							
EF0	S of Paoli	Phillips	CO	40.61°N 102.47°W	2330	0.01 mi (0.016 km)	25 yd (23 m)	$0
EF0	A storm chaser reported a brief tornado.							

=== June 28 event ===
List of confirmed tornadoes – Tuesday, June 28, 2016
EF#	Location	County / Parish	State	Start Coord.	Time (UTC)	Path length	Max width	Damage (2016 USD)
EF0	N of Ashby	Cherry	NE	42.24°N 101.93°W	0032–0034	1 mi (1.6 km)	60 yd (55 m)	$0
EF0	Law Enforcement reported a brief tornado that caused no damage.							
EF2	NW of Hyannis	Grant	NE	42.09°N 101.83°W	0052–0054	1 mi (1.6 km)	150 yd (140 m)	$50,000
EF2	Intermittent tornado destroyed a new metal calving shed, downed a power line, and snapped or twisted several large trees. About 25 1,500 lb (680 kg) hay bales were moved, most of which were unrolled, and hay bales were rolled uphill and into fencing. A pole barn was damaged, with debris found up to 1/2 mi (0.8 km) away, and an empty 500 US gal (1,900 L) water tank was found a mile away.							

=== June 29 event ===
List of confirmed tornadoes – Wednesday, June 29, 2016
EF#	Location	County / Parish	State	Start Coord.	Time (UTC)	Path length	Max width	Damage (2016 USD)
EF0	WSW of Persia	Harrison	IA	41.562°N 95.6741°W	2251–2259	3.28 mi (5.28 km)	25 yd (23 m)	$0
EF0	Tree limbs were downed, a shed was destroyed, and crops were damaged.							
EF0	WNW of Neola	Pottawattamie	IA	41.4978°N 95.6706°W	2306–2315	4.18 mi (6.73 km)	25 yd (23 m)	$0
EF0	Damage occurred mostly to crops and trees.							

=== June 30 event ===
List of confirmed tornadoes – Thursday, June 30, 2016
EF#	Location	County / Parish	State	Start Coord.	Time (UTC)	Path length	Max width	Damage (2016 USD)
EF0	WSW of Poniatowski	Marathon	WI	44.9746°N 89.995°W	0016	0.01 mi (0.016 km)	50 yd (46 m)	$5,000
EF0	Weak tornado pushed over an old barn.							
EF0	NE of Stratton	Kit Carson	CO	39.49°N 102.47°W	0058–0108	1.09 mi (1.75 km)	25 yd (23 m)	$0
EF0	Members of the public reported a tornado.							
EF0	NE of Jerome	Jerome	ID	42.7676°N 114.4308°W	0112–0122	1.46 mi (2.35 km)	50 yd (46 m)	$0
EF0	A tornado developed along a gust front, causing no damage.							

== July ==
Confirmed tornadoes by Enhanced Fujita rating
EFU	EF0	EF1	EF2	EF3	EF4	EF5	Total
1	69	31	6	1	0	0	108

=== July 2 event ===
List of confirmed tornadoes – Saturday, July 2, 2016
EF#	Location	County / Parish	State	Start Coord.	Time (UTC)	Path length	Max width	Damage (2016 USD)
EF0	ESE of Olmitz	Barton	KS	38.49°N 98.87°W	2326–2327	0.83 mi (1.34 km)	50 yd (46 m)	$0
EF0	A trained storm spotter reported a brief cone tornado.							
EF0	SE of Bennett	Adams	CO	39.74°N 104.42°W	0031	0.01 mi (0.016 km)	25 yd (23 m)	$0
EF0	A storm chaser observed a brief tornado over open country.							

=== July 3 event ===
List of confirmed tornadoes – Sunday, July 3, 2016
EF#	Location	County / Parish	State	Start Coord.	Time (UTC)	Path length	Max width	Damage (2016 USD)
EF1	ESE of Stillwater	Payne	OK	36.0979°N 96.9938°W	2111	0.75 mi (1.21 km)	100 yd (91 m)	Unknown
EF1	A trained storm spotter reported a tornado with unspecified damage.							
EF0	SW of Kirksey	Calloway	KY	36.6692°N 88.4163°W	2340–2341	0.37 mi (0.60 km)	100 yd (91 m)	$0
EF0	Tree limbs were snapped, homes sustained shingle damage, and a door was blown off of a well house.							

=== July 4 event ===
List of confirmed tornadoes – Monday, July 4, 2016
EF#	Location	County / Parish	State	Start Coord.	Time (UTC)	Path length	Max width	Damage (2016 USD)
EF2	WSW of Louisa to SSE of Fort Gay	Lawrence, Wayne	KY, WV	38.1021°N 82.6289°W	1944–1951	2.63 mi (4.23 km)	70 yd (64 m)	$501,000
EF2	In Louisa, the tornado damaged a Walmart, tossed vehicles in the parking lot and snapped nearby metal light poles off at the base. Trees and power poles in town were snapped as well, and several outbuildings were damaged. In Fort Gay, the tornado caused minor tree damage before dissipating.							
EF1	WNW of Brodhead	Rockcastle	KY	37.4109°N 84.4384°W	2027–2028	0.18 mi (0.29 km)	40 yd (37 m)	Unknown
EF1	A house sustained minor roof damage, trees and tree limbs were downed, and a car was flipped over.							
EF0	Yawkey	Lincoln	WV	38.2239°N 81.966°W	2042–2043	0.23 mi (0.37 km)	50 yd (46 m)	$30,000
EF0	Minor damage to structures and trees occurred in town, including tree limbs downed and damage to shingles and siding.							
EF0	SSE of Loudendale	Kanawha	WV	38.291°N 81.642°W	2106–2110	1.87 mi (3.01 km)	100 yd (91 m)	$5,000
EF0	Sporadic tree damage occurred along the path.							
EFU	NE of Montgomery	Chatham	GA	31.9347°N 81.1539°W	2118–2120	0.03 mi (0.048 km)	20 yd (18 m)	$0
EFU	A waterspout was observed on Little Ogeechee River.							

=== July 5 event ===
List of confirmed tornadoes – Tuesday, July 5, 2016
EF#	Location	County / Parish	State	Start Coord.	Time (UTC)	Path length	Max width	Damage (2016 USD)
EF0	NE of Appleton	Swift	MN	45.2445°N 95.9863°W	1954–1957	1.27 mi (2.04 km)	25 yd (23 m)	$20,000
EF0	An irrigator was tipped over, three power poles and a few trees were broken, an old appliance was tossed, and up to 15 acres of corn was damaged.							
EF0	E of Holloway	Swift	MN	45.2506°N 95.8705°W	2001–2003	0.25 mi (0.40 km)	50 yd (46 m)	$0
EF0	A brief multiple vortex tornado broke a few trees.							
EF1	ENE of Faribault	Rice	MN	44.33°N 93.2°W	0039–0044	3.67 mi (5.91 km)	100 yd (91 m)	$25,000
EF1	Trees were uprooted; one tree branch completely impaled the outside wall of a home.							
EF0	E of Dennison	Goodhue	MN	44.3938°N 92.9217°W	0054–0057	2.56 mi (4.12 km)	25 yd (23 m)	$0
EF0	A concentrated of tree damage was observed.							
EF1	NE of Oak Center	Wabasha	MN	44.3935°N 92.3456°W	0128–0130	0.09 mi (0.14 km)	50 yd (46 m)	$5,000
EF1	Hardwood trees were snapped off.							
EF0	NW of Plum City	Pierce	WI	44.6871°N 92.2244°W	0135–0136	0.33 mi (0.53 km)	25 yd (23 m)	$0
EF0	Trees were knocked down.							
EF1	NW of Maxville	Pepin	WI	44.566°N 92.105°W	0148–0153	3.31 mi (5.33 km)	100 yd (91 m)	$500,000
EF1	Barns and sheds were destroyed on two farmsteads. Trees were snapped or uprooted.							
EF1	NW of Cream	Buffalo	WI	44.3389°N 91.7889°W	0210–0211	0.74 mi (1.19 km)	100 yd (91 m)	$260,000
EF1	A house and some outbuildings, including a large machine shed, were damaged.							
EF1	SW of Montana	Buffalo	WI	44.3315°N 91.7228°W	0213–0214	0.45 mi (0.72 km)	100 yd (91 m)	$235,000
EF1	The second floor of a hunting structure was removed. Significant crop damage occurred.							
EF0	ENE of De Soto	Vernon	WI	43.4439°N 91.0941°W	0331–0333	0.83 mi (1.34 km)	50 yd (46 m)	$5,000
EF0	Trees and crops were damaged.							

=== July 6 event ===
List of confirmed tornadoes – Wednesday, July 6, 2016
EF#	Location	County / Parish	State	Start Coord.	Time (UTC)	Path length	Max width	Damage (2016 USD)
EF1	NE of Bandana	Ballard, McCracken	KY	37.1743°N 88.9435°W	1826–1835	4.4 mi (7.1 km)	250 yd (230 m)	$115,000
EF1	A house had its roof blown off with debris scattered up to a half mile away. The home's large overhanging porch resulted in removal of the entire roof structure. Other homes sustained minor roof damage, a grain bin was slightly moved, and a garage sustained damage to its roof and siding. A power pole was snapped, and multiple trees were snapped or uprooted along the path.							
EF1	Metropolis	Massac	IL	37.1526°N 88.74°W	1839–1845	2.79 mi (4.49 km)	160 yd (150 m)	$350,000
EF1	This tornado moved directly through Metropolis, causing fascia and awning damage in the downtown area. Houses sustained roof damage, a school building had damage to its overhang and lost several windows, and a maintenance building had its roof blown off. Near the end of the path, a hotel sustained roof damage and corn was flattened in a nearby field. Extensive tree damage occurred along the path.							
EF0	NE of Hemingford	Box Butte	NE	42.48°N 102.77°W	2114–2123	3.16 mi (5.09 km)	30 yd (27 m)	$0
EF0	A trained storm spotter reported a landspout tornado.							
EF0	SW of Rushville	Sheridan	NE	42.55°N 102.76°W	2118–2119	0.1 mi (0.16 km)	10 yd (9.1 m)	$0
EF0	A brief tornado touched down in a rural area.							
EF0	WNW of Webster	Fallon	MT	46.09°N 104.36°W	2140–2145	0.25 mi (0.40 km)	25 yd (23 m)	$0
EF0	Several people observed a tornado touch down atop a hill.							
EF1	S of White Owl	Meade	SD	44.504°N 102.389°W	2228–2233	1.12 mi (1.80 km)	100 yd (91 m)	Unknown
EF1	Multiple pine trees were snapped and uprooted, an old power pole was snapped, and three other power poles were blown over.							
EF0	ESE of Hemingford	Sheridan	NE	42.19°N 102.21°W	2256	0.1 mi (0.16 km)	10 yd (9.1 m)	$0
EF0	A trained storm spotter reported a brief tornado.							
EF1	S of Irwin	Cherry	NE	42.15°N 102°W	2325–2335	4.62 mi (7.44 km)	75 yd (69 m)	$45,000
EF1	A multiple vortex tornado damaged a horse barn and several outbuildings at two separate residences. Large trees were snapped.							
EF1	S of Irwin	Cherry	NE	42.2165°N 101.9108°W	2330–2333	0.5 mi (0.80 km)	50 yd (46 m)	Unknown
EF1	A residence had a portion of its roof lifted, and several outbuildings were damaged.							
EF0	WSW of Tryon	McPherson	NE	41.4136°N 101.3181°W	0003–0007	0.2 mi (0.32 km)	100 yd (91 m)	Unknown
EF0	A grain bin was destroyed and 90 ft (27 m) of center pivot line was flipped.							
EF0	SE of Arthur	Arthur	NE	41.42°N 101.49°W	0055	0.1 mi (0.16 km)	10 yd (9.1 m)	$0
EF0	A trained storm spotter reported a brief tornado.							
EF0	SW of Tryon	McPherson	NE	41.4°N 101.15°W	0108–0110	0.5 mi (0.80 km)	20 yd (18 m)	$0
EF0	A trained storm spotter observed a tornado in open range land.							

=== July 7 event ===
List of confirmed tornadoes – Thursday, July 7, 2016
EF#	Location	County / Parish	State	Start Coord.	Time (UTC)	Path length	Max width	Damage (2016 USD)
EF0	E of Harrisburg	Boone	MO	39.1446°N 92.403°W	1145–1147	0.34 mi (0.55 km)	50 yd (46 m)	$0
EF0	Emergency management observed a tornado in an open field.							
EF0	SE of Lakota	Nelson	ND	47.99°N 98.31°W	1905–1935	9.02 mi (14.52 km)	100 yd (91 m)	Unknown
EF0	Shelterbelts and groves were damaged.							
EF0	W of Loraine	Renville	ND	48.8712°N 101.7065°W	1930–1932	0.32 mi (0.51 km)	20 yd (18 m)	$0
EF0	Members of the public reported a tornado.							
EF0	W of Newburg	Bottineau	ND	48.73°N 101.01°W	2038–2040	0.26 mi (0.42 km)	20 yd (18 m)	$0
EF0	Law enforcement reported a tornado.							
EF0	WSW of Grand Forks	Grand Forks	ND	47.88°N 97.19°W	2206–2207	0.25 mi (0.40 km)	20 yd (18 m)	$0
EF0	Grand Forks air traffic control tower officials observed a brief tornado.							
EF0	N of Thompson	Grand Forks	ND	47.8366°N 97.1083°W	2215–2217	0.5 mi (0.80 km)	40 yd (37 m)	Unknown
EF0	Large trees branches in a shelterbelt were broken.							
EF0	NNW of Thrall	Chase	KS	38.11°N 96.37°W	0153–0154	0.11 mi (0.18 km)	50 yd (46 m)	$0
EF0	A brief tornado touched down for about 15 seconds. No damage occurred.							
EF3	SE of Cassoday to NW of Eureka	Greenwood	KS	37.96°N 96.45°W	0210–0251	4.19 mi (6.74 km)	1,144 yd (1,046 m)	$110,000
EF3	Tornado touched down north of the Otis Creek Reservoir and tracked to the southeast, breaking tree branches. Near the end of the track, the tornado became almost stationary and grew to more than half a mile in width. High-end EF3 damage occurred to a residence that was swept away with only the flooring remaining, although the walls were anchored to the foundation by nails instead of bolts. Significant tree damage also occurred, with severe denuding and defoliation. Corn crop was obliterated as well. The tornado then looped around to the northeast, snapping and uprooting trees before dissipating as the next tornado formed to the southeast.							
EF2	Eureka	Greenwood	KS	37.8411°N 96.3154°W	0241–0253	3.59 mi (5.78 km)	150 yd (140 m)	$3,800,000
EF2	Strong tornado caused extensive damage in Eureka. Outbuildings and mobile homes were demolished, and a granary and grain elevator sustained heavy damage. Homes sustained roof damage, some of which had their roofs torn completely off. A nursing home was heavily damaged, and numerous trees were snapped and uprooted throughout the town.							
EF0	W of Coyville	Wilson	KS	37.69°N 95.93°W	0341–0342	0.11 mi (0.18 km)	50 yd (46 m)	$0
EF0	A rural fire department reported a brief tornado. No damage occurred.							

=== July 8 event ===
List of confirmed tornadoes – Friday, July 8, 2016
EF#	Location	County / Parish	State	Start Coord.	Time (UTC)	Path length	Max width	Damage (2016 USD)
EF0	N of Pinconning	Bay	MI	43.886°N 83.956°W	1916–1920	2 mi (3.2 km)	100 yd (91 m)	$10,000
EF0	Trees were uprooted and branches were snapped. Sheet metal was peeled from a building and wrapped around fencing and trees.							
EF0	SE of Newberry	Luce	MI	46.32°N 85.4065°W	2156–2203	0.01 mi (0.016 km)	75 yd (69 m)	$5,000
EF0	Numerous trees were downed.							
EF0	E of Kissimmee	Osceola	FL	28.323°N 81.2455°W	0033–0034	0.25 mi (0.40 km)	30 yd (27 m)	$0
EF0	A waterspout formed over East Lake Tohopekaliga and moved ashore.							

=== July 9 event ===
List of confirmed tornadoes – Saturday, July 9, 2016
EF#	Location	County / Parish	State	Start Coord.	Time (UTC)	Path length	Max width	Damage (2016 USD)
EF0	NNW of Flasher	Morton	ND	46.4899°N 101.2514°W	1235–1236	0.07 mi (0.11 km)	20 yd (18 m)	$0
EF0	A trained storm spotter reported a tornado.							

=== July 10 event ===
List of confirmed tornadoes – Sunday, July 10, 2016
EF#	Location	County / Parish	State	Start Coord.	Time (UTC)	Path length	Max width	Damage (2016 USD)
EF0	Dillon	Beaverhead	MT	45.22°N 112.65°W	1830–1832	0.03 mi (0.048 km)	50 yd (46 m)	$0
EF0	Members of the public reported a tornado.							
EF0	SE of Baker	Fallon	MT	46.36°N 104.23°W	2110–2130	0.5 mi (0.80 km)	50 yd (46 m)	$0
EF0	Multiple spin-up tornadoes were reported by storm chasers.							
EF1	W of Prentiss	Jefferson Davis	MS	31.5838°N 89.9613°W	2317–2322	0.77 mi (1.24 km)	260 yd (240 m)	$110,000
EF1	Trees and tree limbs were downed, and homes had sections of their roofs torn off. A church had its steeple blown off as well.							

=== July 11 event ===
List of confirmed tornadoes – Monday, July 11, 2016
EF#	Location	County / Parish	State	Start Coord.	Time (UTC)	Path length	Max width	Damage (2016 USD)
EF2	Litchfield	Meeker	MN	45.1237°N 94.5454°W	2225–2232	3.1 mi (5.0 km)	100 yd (91 m)	$0
EF2	This tornado downed many trees in town, heavily damaged the roofs of several homes, and flipped and rolled a double-wide mobile home. Two garages and a shed were destroyed as well.							
EF2	Watkins	Meeker, Stearns	MN	45.2969°N 94.4144°W	2252–2257	2.22 mi (3.57 km)	400 yd (370 m)	$50,000
EF2	Multiple homes in town sustained major roof damage, garages and sheds were destroyed, and many trees were downed. A business sustained significant damage and one person was injured							
EF1	SSE of Pleasant Lake	Stearns	MN	45.3394°N 94.4014°W	2258–2304	4 mi (6.4 km)	250 yd (230 m)	$0
EF1	Two open air cattle sheds were completely destroyed and two cattle were killed. Two grain bins and a metal shed were destroyed, corn was flattened, and trees were damaged.							
EF0	N of Duette	Manatee	FL	27.6°N 82.12°W	2300–2302	0.05 mi (0.080 km)	20 yd (18 m)	$0
EF0	Numerous people observed a tornado in a rural area.							
EF1	S of Ironwood	Iron, Gogebic	WI, MI	46.3618°N 90.1578°W	0441–0446	2.25 mi (3.62 km)	100 yd (91 m)	$50,000
EF1	A barn structure and a car were heavily impacted, several trees were mangled, and some homes were damaged.							
EF1	S of Bessemer	Gogebic	MI	46.4341°N 90.063°W	0455–0500	2.44 mi (3.93 km)	200 yd (180 m)	$100,000
EF1	Multiple trees were downed on a barn and half a barn was destroyed.							

=== July 12 event ===
List of confirmed tornadoes – Tuesday, July 12, 2016
EF#	Location	County / Parish	State	Start Coord.	Time (UTC)	Path length	Max width	Damage (2016 USD)
EF0	N of Chippewa Falls	Chippewa	WI	44.9940°N 91.37°W	0705–0706	0.53 mi (0.85 km)	300 yd (270 m)	$25,000
EF0	Several trees fell onto camper trailers at a campground, and part of a metal roof was peeled off of a machine shed.							
EF0	NE of Enterprise	Wallowa	OR	45.5045°N 117.0445°W	2358–0003	1 mi (1.6 km)	50 yd (46 m)	$0
EF0	Members of the public observed a tornado.							

=== July 13 event ===
List of confirmed tornadoes – Wednesday, July 13, 2016
EF#	Location	County / Parish	State	Start Coord.	Time (UTC)	Path length	Max width	Damage (2016 USD)
EF0	SE of Bridgetown	Hamilton	OH	39.1395°N 84.6093°W	0218–0219	0.71 mi (1.14 km)	150 yd (140 m)	$15,000
EF0	Multiple homes suffered roof damage and two apartment buildings completely lost their roofs. Numerous large limbs and trees were snapped.							

=== July 14 event ===
List of confirmed tornadoes – Thursday, July 14, 2016
EF#	Location	County / Parish	State	Start Coord.	Time (UTC)	Path length	Max width	Damage (2016 USD)
EF0	S of Belvidere	Warren	NJ	40.79°N 75.09°W	1846–1848	2.8 mi (4.5 km)	75 yd (69 m)	Unknown
EF0	A barn sustained considerable damage. A trailer full of hay was lofted, trees and fences were downed, and crops were damaged. One home sustained extensive damage when several trees pierced its roof.							

=== July 15 event ===
List of confirmed tornadoes – Friday, July 15, 2016
EF#	Location	County / Parish	State	Start Coord.	Time (UTC)	Path length	Max width	Damage (2016 USD)
EF1	SSW of Arapahoe	Cheyenne	CO	38.7527°N 102.2221°W	2008–2013	2.32 mi (3.73 km)	100 yd (91 m)	$32,500
EF1	A home lost most of its shingles and roofing material and trees were broken off on a farmstead. Three electrical poles were also broken.							
EF0	SW of Arapahoe	Cheyenne	CO	38.7742°N 102.2509°W	2019–2027	3.65 mi (5.87 km)	200 yd (180 m)	$0
EF0	Law enforcement observed a tornado.							
EF0	NNE of Lamar	Kiowa	CO	38.4685°N 102.2827°W	2100–2105	3.79 mi (6.10 km)	50 yd (46 m)	$0
EF0	A vehicle was blown off the road, a house had its windows broken, and other smaller objects near the house were moved.							
EF1	E of Coolidge	Hamilton	KS	38.0591°N 101.9092°W	2148–2208	7.8 mi (12.6 km)	400 yd (370 m)	Unknown
EF1	Large tornado damaged pivot irrigation sprinklers. Based on video that was taken, this tornado could have been at least an EF3, though lack of available damage indicators negated a higher rating.							

=== July 16 event ===
List of confirmed tornadoes – Saturday, July 16, 2016
EF#	Location	County / Parish	State	Start Coord.	Time (UTC)	Path length	Max width	Damage (2016 USD)
EF0	SE of Porcupine	Oglala Lakota	SD	43.1686°N 102.2458°W	0027–0029	0.1 mi (0.16 km)	20 yd (18 m)	$0
EF0	A trained storm spotter observed a tornado.							
EF0	S of Clark	Clark	SD	44.78°N 97.73°W	0123–0124	0.06 mi (0.097 km)	10 yd (9.1 m)	$0
EF0	Law enforcement reported a brief a tornado.							

=== July 17 event ===
List of confirmed tornadoes – Sunday, July 17, 2016
EF#	Location	County / Parish	State	Start Coord.	Time (UTC)	Path length	Max width	Damage (2016 USD)
EF2	Vinton	Benton	IA	42.1531°N 92.0327°W	0955–0959	1.59 mi (2.56 km)	100 yd (91 m)	Unknown
EF2	This high-end EF2 tornado caused major damage in Vinton. Over a dozen homes, a brick apartment complex, and other buildings sustained damage in town. Some structures lost their entire roofs, and second floor exterior walls were collapsed at the apartment complex. A cell phone tower was toppled over and corn fields were damaged, and numerous trees and power poles were downed. Fencing, large light poles, and a scoreboard were destroyed at a ball field as well. Five people sustained injuries.							
EF2	Walford	Benton, Linn	IA	41.8912°N 91.8966°W	1015–1021	3.99 mi (6.42 km)	75 yd (69 m)	$290,000
EF2	Many homes in town sustained heavy roof damage, and one home was completely destroyed by extensive debris impacts. Trees were snapped, and two farmsteads were damaged outside of town as well.							
EF1	Andrew	Jackson	IA	42.1471°N 90.6023°W	1103–1104	1 mi (1.6 km)	50 yd (46 m)	$5,000,000
EF1	A building at the local co-op was destroyed and many trees were snapped in town.							
EF1	S of Princeton	Scott	IA	41.6437°N 90.3935°W	1125–1128	2.09 mi (3.36 km)	100 yd (91 m)	Unknown
EF1	Hardwood trees were snapped and corn crops were damaged.							
EF0	W of Princeton	Scott	IA	41.674°N 90.549°W	1225–1226	1.95 mi (3.14 km)	10 yd (9.1 m)	Unknown
EF0	Corn stalks were downed and trees were damaged.							
EF0	Galveston	Galveston	TX	29.2668°N 94.8259°W	1330–1331	0.04 mi (0.064 km)	20 yd (18 m)	$0
EF0	A waterspout moved ashore from the Gulf of Mexico but caused no damage.							
EF0	SW of Chilili	Bernalillo	NM	34.8595°N 106.255°W	2200–2202	0.01 mi (0.016 km)	5 yd (4.6 m)	$0
EF0	The public observed a landspout tornado.							
EF0	ENE of Putnam	Putnam	IL	41.19°N 89.36°W	0118–0119	1.19 mi (1.92 km)	25 yd (23 m)	$0
EF0	The local fire chief reported a brief tornado.							
EF0	S of Florid	Putnam	IL	41.22°N 89.28°W	0124–0125	0.24 mi (0.39 km)	25 yd (23 m)	$0
EF0	Law enforcement observed a brief tornado.							
EF1	S of Buckingham	Kankakee	IL	40.9996°N 88.1923°W	0241–0248	2.16 mi (3.48 km)	100 yd (91 m)	Unknown
EF1	Several large metal corrugated pipes were rolled long distances, an outbuilding had its roof ripped off and walls collapsed, two grain bins were destroyed, and many power lines were downed.							

=== July 18 event ===
List of confirmed tornadoes – Monday, July 18, 2016
EF#	Location	County / Parish	State	Start Coord.	Time (UTC)	Path length	Max width	Damage (2016 USD)
EF0	ENE of Pittsburg	Coos	NH	45.0685°N 71.3427°W	1642–1646	2.02 mi (3.25 km)	100 yd (91 m)	Unknown
EF0	Hundreds of trees were snapped and uprooted; downed trees also took power lines down.							
EF0	WNW of Caribou	Aroostook	ME	46.9169°N 68.2343°W	2140–2141	0.07 mi (0.11 km)	30 yd (27 m)	Unknown
EF0	Numerous trees were snapped or uprooted.							

=== July 19 event ===
List of confirmed tornadoes – Tuesday, July 19, 2016
EF#	Location	County / Parish	State	Start Coord.	Time (UTC)	Path length	Max width	Damage (2016 USD)
EF0	NNW of Melrose	Monroe	IA	40.9807°N 93.0528°W	1934–1938	2.34 mi (3.77 km)	50 yd (46 m)	$5,000
EF0	Law enforcement reported a narrow damage path.							
EF1	NE of Milton	Pembina	ND	48.76°N 97.86°W	2230–2240	5.29 mi (8.51 km)	880 yd (800 m)	Unknown
EF1	Numerous hardwood trees were snapped or uprooted in a shelterbelt.							
EF1	Hoople	Walsh	ND	48.54°N 97.64°W	2317–2321	1.5 mi (2.4 km)	440 yd (400 m)	Unknown
EF1	Numerous large tree branches were downed and a potato warehouse was damaged.							
EF1	SSW of Nash	Walsh	ND	48.45°N 97.54°W	2336–2339	1 mi (1.6 km)	200 yd (180 m)	Unknown
EF1	Numerous trees were snapped or uprooted.							
EF1	ESE of Euclid	Polk, Red Lake	MN	47.96°N 96.49°W	0155–0210	4.83 mi (7.77 km)	300 yd (270 m)	Unknown
EF1	Numerous trees in shelterbelts were downed, a horse trailer was rolled, a calf shed was blown apart, and a hay shed was collapsed.							
EF1	N of Puposky	Beltrami	MN	47.73°N 94.94°W	0214–0226	4 mi (6.4 km)	400 yd (370 m)	Unknown
EF1	Several hundred trees were snapped or uprooted and a structure had shingles torn off its roof.							

=== July 20 event ===
List of confirmed tornadoes – Wednesday, July 20, 2016
EF#	Location	County / Parish	State	Start Coord.	Time (UTC)	Path length	Max width	Damage (2016 USD)
EF0	ESE of Palermo	Mountrail	ND	48.3089°N 102.1612°W	2142–2146	0.95 mi (1.53 km)	30 yd (27 m)	$0
EF0	Law enforcement observed a tornado.							

=== July 22 event ===
List of confirmed tornadoes – Friday, July 22, 2016
EF#	Location	County / Parish	State	Start Coord.	Time (UTC)	Path length	Max width	Damage (2016 USD)
EF0	Wassaw Sound	Chatham	GA	31.94°N 80.95°W	1510–1515	0.09 mi (0.14 km)	20 yd (18 m)	$0
EF0	Emergency management spotted a waterspout.							
EF0	SE of Ellisville	Jones	MS	31.5496°N 89.1007°W	1904–1909	0.86 mi (1.38 km)	100 yd (91 m)	$45,000
EF0	Some trees were uprooted and tree branches snapped. A makeshift carport collapsed onto a car and two porches had sheet metal roofing peeled partially back. An outbuilding had its awning removed, and a large tree branch fell on the roof of one house.							
EF0	NW of Mold	Douglas	WA	47.7812°N 119.4061°W	1931–1941	0.2 mi (0.32 km)	50 yd (46 m)	$0
EF0	The public videoed a tornado.							
EF0	W of Spokane	Spokane	WA	47.6611°N 117.5603°W	2220–2240	0.2 mi (0.32 km)	50 yd (46 m)	$0
EF0	An NWS employee reported debris from a tornado.							

=== July 23 event ===
List of confirmed tornadoes – Saturday, July 23, 2016
EF#	Location	County / Parish	State	Start Coord.	Time (UTC)	Path length	Max width	Damage (2016 USD)
EF1	NE of Monti	Buchanan, Delaware	IA	42.4393°N 91.5984°W	2105–2107	0.16 mi (0.26 km)	25 yd (23 m)	$5,000
EF1	A roof was ripped off a barn.							
EF1	SW of Delhi	Delaware	IA	42.4109°N 91.3927°W	2118–2119	0.22 mi (0.35 km)	10 yd (9.1 m)	Unknown
EF1	A waterspout formed over Lake Delhi and moved ashore, damaging trees.							
EF0	N of Worthington	Dubuque	IA	42.4235°N 91.1265°W	2148–2150	0.78 mi (1.26 km)	25 yd (23 m)	$0
EF0	Local law enforcement observed a tornado.							
EF0	WSW of Summerfield	Marion	FL	28.9653°N 82.1881°W	0100–0101	0.88 mi (1.42 km)	50 yd (46 m)	$0
EF0	The tops of trees were damaged, including some branches that were stripped of bark.							

=== July 25 event ===
List of confirmed tornadoes – Monday, July 25, 2016
EF#	Location	County / Parish	State	Start Coord.	Time (UTC)	Path length	Max width	Damage (2016 USD)
EF1	N of Monroeton	Bradford	PA	41.7295°N 76.4726°W	1858–1900	0.11 mi (0.18 km)	50 yd (46 m)	$25,000
EF1	Numerous softwood trees were snapped.							
EF1	Readington	Hunterdon	NJ	40.58°N 74.73°W	2112–2118	3.49 mi (5.62 km)	75 yd (69 m)	Unknown
EF1	A tornado caused unspecified damage.							

=== July 26 event ===
List of confirmed tornadoes – Tuesday, July 26, 2016
EF#	Location	County / Parish	State	Start Coord.	Time (UTC)	Path length	Max width	Damage (2016 USD)
EF0	N of Berea	Barnes	ND	46.95°N 98.1°W	1940–1941	0.25 mi (0.40 km)	20 yd (18 m)	Unknown
EF0	A tornado touched down in an open field.							
EF0	SSW of Freda	Grant	ND	46.33°N 101.18°W	0050–0051	0.09 mi (0.14 km)	20 yd (18 m)	$0
EF0	The public reported a brief tornado.							
EF1	NE of Clinton	Sheridan	NE	42.8151°N 102.3054°W	0100–0103	1 mi (1.6 km)	100 yd (91 m)	$25,000
EF1	Three rows of tree wind breaks were damaged, 75 yd (69 m) of fencing was destroyed, shingles were removed from a double wide mobile home, and several tree trunks were snapped.							
EF0	NE of Gordon	Sheridan	NE	42.88°N 102.11°W	0139	0.2 mi (0.32 km)	20 yd (18 m)	$0
EF0	A trained storm spotter observed a tornado over an open field.							

=== July 27 event ===
List of confirmed tornadoes – Wednesday, July 27, 2016
EF#	Location	County / Parish	State	Start Coord.	Time (UTC)	Path length	Max width	Damage (2016 USD)
EF0	SE of Winsted	McLeod	MN	44.9472°N 94.026°W	1705–1706	0.36 mi (0.58 km)	25 yd (23 m)	$0
EF0	Several trees were downed and heavy farm machinery was moved.							
EF0	SSW of Chetek	Barron	WI	45.266°N 91.6674°W	2055–2056	0.2 mi (0.32 km)	25 yd (23 m)	$50,000
EF0	A large metal shed was destroyed. Trees were downed.							
EF0	NNE of Berry	Mohave	AZ	35.29°N 113.96°W	2238–2240	0.1 mi (0.16 km)	25 yd (23 m)	$0
EF0	The public videoed a landspout tornado.							
EF0	WNW of Algona	Kossuth	IA	43.0971°N 94.3426°W	2215–2216	0.36 mi (0.58 km)	15 yd (14 m)	$1,000
EF0	Crops sustained minor damage.							
EF0	E of Nunn	Weld	CO	40.7°N 104.76°W	2254	0.01 mi (0.016 km)	25 yd (23 m)	$0
EF0	Broadcast media aired a tornado over open country.							
EF0	W of Scarville	Winnebago	IA	43.4706°N 93.7139°W	2311–2312	0.34 mi (0.55 km)	20 yd (18 m)	$1,000
EF0	Crops sustained minor damage.							
EF0	SE of Ottosen	Humboldt	IA	42.8779°N 94.3483°W	2339–2341	0.68 mi (1.09 km)	30 yd (27 m)	$2,000
EF0	Crops sustained minor damage.							

=== July 28 event ===
List of confirmed tornadoes – Thursday, July 28, 2016
EF#	Location	County / Parish	State	Start Coord.	Time (UTC)	Path length	Max width	Damage (2016 USD)
EF0	W of Kingman	Kingman	KS	37.64°N 98.3°W	0116–0117	3.79 mi (6.10 km)	75 yd (69 m)	$0
EF0	The public reported a brief tornado.							

=== July 29 event ===
List of confirmed tornadoes – Friday, July 29, 2016
EF#	Location	County / Parish	State	Start Coord.	Time (UTC)	Path length	Max width	Damage (2016 USD)
EF0	WNW of Dalton	Morrill	NE	41.5°N 103.27°W	2322–2327	1.31 mi (2.11 km)	30 yd (27 m)	$0
EF0	A storm chaser tracked a tornado in open country.							

=== July 30 event ===
List of confirmed tornadoes – Saturday, July 30, 2016
EF#	Location	County / Parish	State	Start Coord.	Time (UTC)	Path length	Max width	Damage (2016 USD)
EF0	NNE of Galbraith	Kossuth	IA	43.0087°N 94.1578°W	1529–1531	0.47 mi (0.76 km)	30 yd (27 m)	$1,000
EF0	An airport pilot observed a tornado that damaged crops.							

=== July 31 event ===
List of confirmed tornadoes – Sunday, July 31, 2016
EF#	Location	County / Parish	State	Start Coord.	Time (UTC)	Path length	Max width	Damage (2016 USD)
EF0	N of Soda Springs	Caribou	ID	42.6934°N 111.58°W	2135–2140	1.68 mi (2.70 km)	10 yd (9.1 m)	$0
EF0	A video of a weak tornado was posted on social media.							

== August ==
Confirmed tornadoes by Enhanced Fujita rating
EFU	EF0	EF1	EF2	EF3	EF4	EF5	Total
3	58	19	7	3	0	0	90

=== August 1 event ===
List of confirmed tornadoes – Monday, August 1, 2016
EF#	Location	County / Parish	State	Start Coord.	Time (UTC)	Path length	Max width	Damage (2016 USD)
EF0	Ocean City	Worcester	MD	38.34°N 75.09°W	2040–2045	3.82 mi (6.15 km)	50 yd (46 m)	$75,000
EF0	A waterspout moved onshore from Assawoman Bay, damaging several businesses and overturning a supply container and moving it down the beach.							
EF0	S of Memphis	Saunders	NE	41.0431°N 96.465°W	2121–2125	0.04 mi (0.064 km)	15 yd (14 m)	$0
EF0	A landspout tornado was reported via social media.							

=== August 3 event ===
List of confirmed tornadoes – Wednesday, August 3, 2016
EF#	Location	County / Parish	State	Start Coord.	Time (UTC)	Path length	Max width	Damage (2016 USD)
EF2	S of Mylo	Rolette, Towner	ND	48.56°N 99.61°W	2228–2345	20.02 mi (32.22 km)	1,200 yd (1,100 m)	$950,000
EF2	A very large multiple-vortex tornado caused extensive damage to two farmsteads in Rolette County and two more in Towner County. Multiple stretches of utility poles were cracked or snapped.							
EF0	NNE of Devils Lake	Ramsey	ND	48.23°N 98.8°W	0140–0143	1.38 mi (2.22 km)	40 yd (37 m)	Unknown
EF0	Multiple storm chasers observed a tornado over open fields.							
EF0	N of Devils Lake	Ramsey	ND	48.2°N 98.87°W	0141–0143	0.8 mi (1.3 km)	40 yd (37 m)	Unknown
EF0	Multiple storm chasers observed a tornado over open fields.							
EF2	ESE of Sheyenne	Eddy	ND	47.77°N 98.86°W	0210–0220	3.25 mi (5.23 km)	300 yd (270 m)	Unknown
EF2	Numerous trees were snapped or uprooted. The roof was ripped off a farmhouse, and several outbuildings were destroyed.							

=== August 4 event ===
List of confirmed tornadoes – Thursday, August 4, 2016
EF#	Location	County / Parish	State	Start Coord.	Time (UTC)	Path length	Max width	Damage (2016 USD)
EF1	SSW of Milan	Marathon	WI	44.916°N 90.207°W	1620–1626	4.35 mi (7.00 km)	250 yd (230 m)	$105,000
EF1	A fast-moving tornado caused minor to moderate damage to over a dozen homes and farmsteads.							
EF1	Yulee	Nassau	FL	30.5912°N 81.5723°W	1740–1757	3.67 mi (5.91 km)	200 yd (180 m)	$0
EF1	The tornado caused significant tree and shingle damage and flipped truck trailers, a semi trailer, and an unanchored structure. An estimated 40–50 homes were damaged.							
EF0	New Orleans	Orleans	LA	29.9692°N 90.0628°W	2030–2032	0.54 mi (0.87 km)	50 yd (46 m)	$0
EF0	Two people suffered minor injuries.							
EF0	N of Bartlett	Pottawattamie	IA	41.2065°N 95.8595°W	2221–2236	0.58 mi (0.93 km)	15 yd (14 m)	$0
EF0	A waterspout was observed over Lake Manawa.							

=== August 7 event ===
List of confirmed tornadoes – Sunday, August 7, 2016
EF#	Location	County / Parish	State	Start Coord.	Time (UTC)	Path length	Max width	Damage (2016 USD)
EF1	E of Gillette	Campbell	WY	44.2890°N 105.3636°W	0155–0159	1.52 mi (2.45 km)	365 yd (334 m)	Unknown
EF1	About a dozen homes were damaged.							

=== August 9 event ===
List of confirmed tornadoes – Tuesday, August 9, 2016
EF#	Location	County / Parish	State	Start Coord.	Time (UTC)	Path length	Max width	Damage (2016 USD)
EF0	NE of Cicero	Cook	IL	41.832°N 87.7261°W	2048–2058	0.01 mi (0.016 km)	10 yd (9.1 m)	$0
EF0	An FAA contract observer spotted a landspout tornado.							
EF0	W of Spokane	Spokane	WA	47.6505°N 117.6196°W	0035–0045	0.2 mi (0.32 km)	25 yd (23 m)	$0
EF0	A cold air funnel briefly touched down.							

=== August 10 event ===
List of confirmed tornadoes – Wednesday, August 10, 2016
EF#	Location	County / Parish	State	Start Coord.	Time (UTC)	Path length	Max width	Damage (2016 USD)
EF0	SE of Hamden	New Haven	CT	41.3461°N 72.8712°W	1729–1734	2.69 mi (4.33 km)	50 yd (46 m)	$15,000
EF0	Trees fell on cars and power lines. Minor structural damage was observed.							
EF0	Mattituck	Suffolk	NY	40.9977°N 72.5163°W	2018–2021	0.38 mi (0.61 km)	40 yd (37 m)	$10,000
EF0	Damage was mostly limited to trees, with several trees snapped in half.							

=== August 11 event ===
List of confirmed tornadoes – Thursday, August 11, 2016
EF#	Location	County / Parish	State	Start Coord.	Time (UTC)	Path length	Max width	Damage (2016 USD)
EF0	N of Sargent	Custer	NE	41.6734°N 99.37°W	2031	0.01 mi (0.016 km)	10 yd (9.1 m)	$0
EF0	A brief landspout tornado was reported.							
EF0	N of Sargent	Custer	NE	41.68°N 99.37°W	2033	0.01 mi (0.016 km)	10 yd (9.1 m)	$0
EF0	The public documented a brief landspout tornado.							
EF1	W of Hermansville	Menominee	MI	45.7017°N 87.6662°W	2131–2140	1.25 mi (2.01 km)	200 yd (180 m)	$10,000
EF1	The tornado snapped and uprooted numerous trees and tossed small farm equipment.							
EF0	SW of Rockville	Sherman	NE	41.0537°N 98.9299°W	0152–0153	0.1 mi (0.16 km)	20 yd (18 m)	$0
EF0	A storm chaser observed a narrow, short-lived tornado.							

=== August 12 event ===
List of confirmed tornadoes – Friday, August 12, 2016
EF#	Location	County / Parish	State	Start Coord.	Time (UTC)	Path length	Max width	Damage (2016 USD)
EF0	N of Central	East Baton Rouge	LA	30.5889°N 91.0316°W	1444–1445	0.34 mi (0.55 km)	25 yd (23 m)	$200,000
EF0	Numerous trees were downed or snapped. Multiple buildings sustained roof and chimney damage. Power lines were downed, a double carport was destroyed, and a 15,000 lb (240,000 oz) fifth wheel camper was rolled over.							
EF0	NW of Fennville	Allegan	MI	42.6267°N 86.1678°W	1810–1812	1.08 mi (1.74 km)	50 yd (46 m)	$75,000
EF0	A brief tornado destroyed an outbuilding and caused significant tree damage. Two homes suffered minor roof and siding damage from debris and fallen trees.							

=== August 13 event ===
List of confirmed tornadoes – Saturday, August 13, 2016
EF#	Location	County / Parish	State	Start Coord.	Time (UTC)	Path length	Max width	Damage (2016 USD)
EF0	S of Counselor	McKinley	NM	35.96°N 107.35°W	1925–1930	0.01 mi (0.016 km)	50 yd (46 m)	$0
EF0	A brief landspout tornado was confirmed via social media.							
EF0	NE of Capulin	Union	NM	36.7707°N 103.9517°W	2002	0.01 mi (0.016 km)	50 yd (46 m)	$0
EF0	A brief tornado touched down on a mesa.							
EF0	SE of Tice	Lee	FL	26.66°N 81.8043°W	2326–2328	0.1 mi (0.16 km)	15 yd (14 m)	$20,000
EF0	Four buildings had their roofs partially peeled back and gutters ripped off.							

=== August 14 event ===
List of confirmed tornadoes – Sunday, August 14, 2016
EF#	Location	County / Parish	State	Start Coord.	Time (UTC)	Path length	Max width	Damage (2016 USD)
EFU	SW of Colerain	Belmont	OH	40.1°N 80.86°W	1758–1759	0.53 mi (0.85 km)	1 yd (0.91 m)	$0
EFU	Video showed a brief tornado touchdown; an NWS survey found no evidence of damage.							

=== August 15 event ===
List of confirmed tornadoes – Monday, August 15, 2016
EF#	Location	County / Parish	State	Start Coord.	Time (UTC)	Path length	Max width	Damage (2016 USD)
EF1	NW of Clayton	Hendricks	IN	39.6811°N 86.5611°W	2136–2139	1.83 mi (2.95 km)	500 yd (460 m)	$18,000
EF1	A few farm buildings sustained minor damage, a trailer was rolled, and trees were uprooted.							
EF0	WSW of Cairo	Tippecanoe	IN	40.5179°N 86.9492°W	2156–2157	0.51 mi (0.82 km)	40 yd (37 m)	$5,500
EF0	Three trees were downed, a mailbox was destroyed, and a 25 yd (23 m) wide path of corn was flattened.							
EF1	W of Brownsburg	Hendricks	IN	39.8531°N 86.4308°W	2206–2207	0.42 mi (0.68 km)	100 yd (91 m)	$7,500
EF1	A pontoon boat was pushed across the street and several trees were uprooted.							
EF1	NW of Avon	Hendricks	IN	39.7854°N 86.4195°W	2215–2216	0.02 mi (0.032 km)	50 yd (46 m)	$5,000
EF1	A few tree trunks were snapped.							
EF0	N of Brownsburg	Hendricks	IN	39.9217°N 86.3987°W	2219–2220	0.01 mi (0.016 km)	40 yd (37 m)	$5,000
EF0	Front porch pillars were ripped from a house and tree branches were downed.							
EF2	SE of Whitestown	Boone	IN	39.9615°N 86.3367°W	2227–2235	3.8 mi (6.1 km)	150 yd (140 m)	$28,000
EF2	A pole barn was destroyed, a grain bin and some farm equipment were damaged, trees were snapped and limbs downed, and corn was flattened.							
EF1	S of Boxley	Hamilton	IN	40.1414°N 86.1763°W	2304–2306	0.42 mi (0.68 km)	100 yd (91 m)	$12,000
EF1	Several tree trunks were snapped and corn was flattened.							
EF0	ENE of Sycamore	Howard	IN	40.5218°N 85.8678°W	0017–0018	0.12 mi (0.19 km)	50 yd (46 m)	$8,000
EF0	Several tree branches were snapped, tin roofing was partially peeled off a shed, and windows were blown out of a barn and a house.							

=== August 16 event ===
List of confirmed tornadoes – Tuesday, August 16, 2016
EF#	Location	County / Parish	State	Start Coord.	Time (UTC)	Path length	Max width	Damage (2016 USD)
EF0	WSW of Constableville	Lewis	NY	43.5649°N 75.4457°W	2234–2238	0.22 mi (0.35 km)	10 yd (9.1 m)	$8,000
EF0	A small section of a cornfield was flattened.							

=== August 17 event ===
List of confirmed tornadoes – Wednesday, August 17, 2016
EF#	Location	County / Parish	State	Start Coord.	Time (UTC)	Path length	Max width	Damage (2016 USD)
EF0	Sardinia	Brown	OH	39.0068°N 83.8128°W	1516–1519	1 mi (1.6 km)	100 yd (91 m)	$30,000
EF0	The tornado snapped trees and caused minor structural damage to sheds and porches.							
EF0	Donora to Webster	Washington, Westmoreland	PA	40.174°N 79.866°W	1841–1842	0.87 mi (1.40 km)	250 yd (230 m)	$10,000
EF0	The tornado snapped and uprooted numerous trees and caused roof, siding, and chimney damage to homes and buildings. Several porch awnings were destroyed. A bricked garage had a wall blown out and was shifted until a wall cracked. The tornado crossed the Monongahela River before dissipating near Webster.							

=== August 18 event ===
List of confirmed tornadoes – Thursday, August 18, 2016
EF#	Location	County / Parish	State	Start Coord.	Time (UTC)	Path length	Max width	Damage (2016 USD)
EF0	SE of Hollandale	Freeborn	MN	43.762°N 93.2111°W	2131–2132	0.09 mi (0.14 km)	50 yd (46 m)	$5,000
EF0	A cornfield and trees were damaged.							

=== August 19 event ===
List of confirmed tornadoes – Friday, August 19, 2016
EF#	Location	County / Parish	State	Start Coord.	Time (UTC)	Path length	Max width	Damage (2016 USD)
EFU	SW of Oakland	Limestone	AL	34.6541°N 87.0079°W	0450–0452	0.09 mi (0.14 km)	50 yd (46 m)	$0
EFU	A waterspout was spotted on Wheeler Dam; an NWS survey found no evidence of damage.							

=== August 20 event ===
List of confirmed tornadoes – Saturday, August 20, 2016
EF#	Location	County / Parish	State	Start Coord.	Time (UTC)	Path length	Max width	Damage (2016 USD)
EF0	W of Kewaunee	Kewaunee	WI	44.4514°N 87.5222°W	1503–1506	0.7 mi (1.1 km)	125 yd (114 m)	$25,000
EF0	About 100 trees were uprooted or had broken limbs. Several homes had shingle and siding damage.							
EF1	SW of Bangor to NE of Grand Junction	Van Buren, Allegan	MI	42.296°N 86.126°W	1713–1731	10.59 mi (17.04 km)	150 yd (140 m)	$2,000,000
EF1	The tornado damage multiple structures, including the police department and knocked down hundreds of trees in Bangor. All of Bangor lost power. It caused significant damage to a farm and to the Columbia Township Hall in Grand Junction before crossing into extreme southern Allegan County and dissipating.							
EF1	SE of Fennville to NE of Hamilton	Allegan	MI	42.533°N 86.023°W	1742–1810	12.76 mi (20.54 km)	100 yd (91 m)	$1,500,000
EF1	A garage and barn suffered roof and siding damage and large tree limbs were snapped.							
EF1	SSE of Hudsonville	Allegan, Ottawa	MI	42.763°N 85.861°W	1818–1826	4.08 mi (6.57 km)	100 yd (91 m)	$500,000
EF1	Heavy tree damage was observed.							
EF0	Grandville to Wyoming	Kent	MI	42.8848°N 85.7461°W	1834–1844	4.25 mi (6.84 km)	75 yd (69 m)	$500,000
EF0	The tornado followed a meandering path across the Wyoming area, damaging or knocking down hundreds of trees, which caused numerous power outages. Many homes and a number of vehicles were damaged by fallen trees. The tornado was accompanied by damaging straight-line winds of up to 100 mph (160 km/h).							
EF0	Grand Rapids	Kent	MI	42.984°N 85.6224°W	1850–1852	0.9 mi (1.4 km)	50 yd (46 m)	$25,000
EF0	A brief tornado caused tree damage along its path. Some property damage resulted from fallen trees.							
EF0	SW of Milford	Kosciusko	IN	41.368°N 85.9299°W	1853–1857	1.6 mi (2.6 km)	10 yd (9.1 m)	$0
EF0	Sporadic damage was noted in several soy bean and corn fields.							
EF1	E of Orleans to SE of Sheridan	Ionia, Montcalm	MI	43.068°N 85.128°W	1910–1925	7.8 mi (12.6 km)	100 yd (91 m)	$750,000
EF1	Near the start of the path the tornado brought down several large trees, one of which struck a house, blew out the wall of a garage, and peeled shingles from another house. The rest of the path consisted of tree damage and narrowed as it crossed into Montcalm County. Cornfields were flattened.							
EF0	NE of Syracuse	Elkhart	IN	41.4431°N 85.7408°W	1919–1920	0.06 mi (0.097 km)	50 yd (46 m)	$0
EF0	The tornado caused minor damage to two homes, snapped limbs from multiple trees, and flattened corn in a field.							
EF0	NE of Fort Wayne	Allen	IN	41.1614°N 85.0551°W	2142–2149	2.38 mi (3.83 km)	70 yd (64 m)	$0
EF0	The tornado produced sporadic damage along its path. Near the start it caused extensive tree damage and flattened corn. Farther along a pine tree was uprooted and a nearby house had suffered shingle damage. Near the end of the path a swing set was blown from the back yard of a residence to the front yard.							
EF0	S of Gettysburg	Darke	OH	40.0649°N 84.5053°W	2215–2226	4.7 mi (7.6 km)	50 yd (46 m)	$20,500
EF0	Near the start of the path the tornado severely damaged a barn, toppled a rotted tree, and flipped and damaged a small tractor trailer. A small phone booth was knocked over. Soybean and corn crops were damaged along much of the path.							
EF0	S of Glasgow	Barren	KY	36.9433°N 85.873°W	2230–2233	1.58 mi (2.54 km)	30 yd (27 m)	$100,000
EF0	The tornado flattened corn and tore the roof off a large metal outbuilding. Several nearby buildings suffered minor damage from debris.							
EF0	Delaware State Park	Delaware	OH	40.3439°N 83.0894°W	2237–2249	3.3 mi (5.3 km)	100 yd (91 m)	$20,000
EF0	A weak tornado snapped tree limbs and uprooted shallow rotted trees with one tree damaging the roof of a garage. The roof of a barn partially collapsed. The tornado lifted and touched down again, snapping more tree limbs, moving a dumpster, and causing minor damage to boats at a marina.							

=== August 22 event ===
List of confirmed tornadoes – Monday, August 22, 2016
EF#	Location	County / Parish	State	Start Coord.	Time (UTC)	Path length	Max width	Damage (2016 USD)
EF1	Concord	Middlesex	MA	42.4567°N 71.3398°W	0720–0721	0.85 mi (1.37 km)	400 yd (370 m)	$1,000,000
EF1	A tornado embedded in damaging straight-line winds uprooted and sheared the tops from trees. A total of 39 houses were damaged, one with significant structural damage.							

=== August 23 event ===
List of confirmed tornadoes – Tuesday, August 23, 2016
EF#	Location	County / Parish	State	Start Coord.	Time (UTC)	Path length	Max width	Damage (2016 USD)
EF0	SSW of Aurora	Cloud	KS	39.37°N 97.57°W	0015–0016	0.05 mi (0.080 km)	25 yd (23 m)	$0
EF0	A brief tornado was observed in an open field.							
EF0	NE of Washington	Washington	NE	41.4138°N 96.1909°W	0035–0036	0.19 mi (0.31 km)	25 yd (23 m)	$0
EF0	An NWS employee reported a brief tornado.							
EF0	ENE of Washington	Washington	NE	41.4188°N 96.1718°W	0058–0059	0.1 mi (0.16 km)	25 yd (23 m)	$0
EF0	An NWS employee reported another brief tornado.							

=== August 24 event ===
List of confirmed tornadoes – Wednesday, August 24, 2016
EF#	Location	County / Parish	State	Start Coord.	Time (UTC)	Path length	Max width	Damage (2016 USD)
EF2	SE of Crawfordsville	Montgomery	IN	40.0018°N 86.8735°W	1838–1848	5.37 mi (8.64 km)	125 yd (114 m)	$75,000
EF2	This tornado damaged 30 homes, with the most severe damage occurring in the Linnsburg area. Extensive damage to trees and barns occurred as well.							
EF3	Southern Kokomo	Howard	IN	40.4613°N 86.1884°W	1920–1934	8.63 mi (13.89 km)	300 yd (270 m)	$10,000,000
EF3	Strong tornado caused major damage in the southern part of Kokomo. 1,000 homes were damaged, 170 of which sustained major damage. 80 of these homes were destroyed, some sustaining loss of roofs and exterior walls. Many large trees and power poles were snapped along the path, and the Park Place Apartments were heavily damaged as well. Vehicles were also damaged, including a large truck that was moved 10 feet from the driveway of a house and flipped over. A Starbucks was completely destroyed, and several people were left trapped inside and had to be rescued. Many sheds and detached garages were destroyed as well, and a receipt from Kokomo was found 30 miles away in Marion.							
EF0	Indianapolis	Marion	IN	39.8031°N 86.1108°W	2018–2019	0.37 mi (0.60 km)	100 yd (91 m)	$15,000
EF0	Tornado briefly touched down in the Brightwood neighborhood of Indianapolis, snapping numerous tree limbs and downing a large but rotten tree. A house had its windows blown out and pieces of its siding removed, while a large commercial building sustained minor roof damage.							
EF0	E of Van Buren	Wells	IN	40.6103°N 85.4249°W	2059–2100	0.04 mi (0.064 km)	20 yd (18 m)	$0
EF0	A brief tornado snapped tree branches, pulled metal siding from a pole barn, and dragged an unanchored wellhouse into a pond.							
EF3	NW of Woodburn to E of Harlan	Allen	IN	41.1475°N 84.9187°W	2127–2139	5.16 mi (8.30 km)	500 yd (460 m)	$0
EF3	EF3 multiple-vortex wedge tornado damaged several houses, some heavily. One home was swept away with only the subflooring left behind, though the home was poorly anchored and trees in the immediate vicinity sustained only minimal damage. Corn and soybean fields were severely scoured along the path, and many large trees were snapped and uprooted, including a few that were denuded and debarked. Large, well-constructed barns were completely obliterated with debris scattered up to a mile away. Two combines from one of the barns were thrown and mangled, one of which was found 200 yards away. A dump truck from the same location was thrown and had its cab and engine ripped from the frame, while a nearby car was carried at least 585 yards into a field. A large, well-anchored barn was swept away at another location, with three vehicles stored inside being destroyed. Many other small outbuildings were damaged or destroyed as well. Surveyors noted that the extreme vehicle and machinery damage may suggest a higher intensity.							
EF1	ESE of Flora to NNE of Kokomo	Carroll, Howard	IN	40.5280°N 86.4309°W	2140–2222	17.06 mi (27.46 km)	100 yd (91 m)	$59,000
EF1	Several barns suffered partial wall and roof damage along the path, while a garage slid off its foundation. Trees and crops were damaged throughout the path, and wooden power poles were bent over.							
EF1	N of Berne	Adams	IN	40.6832°N 85.0247°W	2149–2203	7.56 mi (12.17 km)	50 yd (46 m)	$0
EF1	The tornado followed a skipping path, occasionally touching down in corn and bean fields. Several taller barn structures suffered partial roof loss with debris thrown several hundred yards. Large trees had broken limbs while smaller trees were knocked down or uprooted.							
EF2	NE of Antwerp to SE of Mark Center	Paulding, Defiance	OH	41.2220°N 84.6813°W	2153–2204	4.42 mi (7.11 km)	250 yd (230 m)	$0
EF2	Strong multiple-vortex tornado passed near the town of Cecil, causing extensive damage to farmsteads. Homes had their roofs torn off and were shifted off of their foundations, and the newer addition of one farm home was completely destroyed. Two mobile homes were blown off of their foundations. Vehicles, barns, garages, and outbuildings were destroyed, and many large trees were snapped and uprooted along the path as well.							
EF0	Peru	Miami	IN	40.7740°N 86.0796°W	2213–2214	0.06 mi (0.097 km)	20 yd (18 m)	$0
EF0	The tornado briefly touched down, damaging shingles at a medical center downing large tree limbs.							
EF2	N of Defiance	Defiance	OH	41.3231°N 84.3803°W	2228–2234	2.64 mi (4.25 km)	400 yd (370 m)	$0
EF2	Trees and tree limbs were snapped, the roof was torn from a business, and power poles were snapped as well. A house sustained roof damage, a storage building collapsed, and barns and outbuildings were destroyed.							
EF1	W of Van Wert	Van Wert	OH	40.8241°N 84.7257°W	2230–2241	5.45 mi (8.77 km)	75 yd (69 m)	$0
EF1	The tornado skipped along its path. Trees were uprooted and snapped. One home suffered roof and siding damage while mud was thrown onto a nearby garage, which suffered minor damage. A large barn lost its roof. Small grave stones were moved.							
EF0	NW of Van Wert	Van Wert	OH	40.8878°N 84.6698°W	2241–2245	1.47 mi (2.37 km)	25 yd (23 m)	$0
EF0	A secondary spin-up tornado damaged corn and bean crops.							
EF1	W of Napoleon	Henry	OH	41.3823°N 84.2161°W	2248–2254	2.8 mi (4.5 km)	150 yd (140 m)	$0
EF1	A tornado with multiple touchdowns broke tree limbs and caused roof damage to several homes. A storage building was severely damaged, a barn was destroyed, and several silos were moved off their foundations.							
EF0	NE of Van Wert	Van Wert	OH	40.9108°N 84.5538°W	2251–2304	4.65 mi (7.48 km)	40 yd (37 m)	$0
EF0	The tornado mainly caused damage to corn and bean crops. The tornado lifted at one point near the middle of the path.							
EF0	Indian Heights	Howard	IN	40.4335°N 86.1217°W	2258–2300	0.67 mi (1.08 km)	75 yd (69 m)	$10,000
EF0	Homes and trees were damaged.							
EF1	S of Russiaville	Howard	IN	40.3993°N 86.2714°W	2300–2302	1.5 mi (2.4 km)	50 yd (46 m)	$25,000
EF1	One garage was damaged, and trees and crops were damaged throughout the path.							
EF0	NE of Van Wert	Van Wert	OH	40.9602°N 84.4437°W	2304–2310	2.46 mi (3.96 km)	20 yd (18 m)	$0
EF0	The tornado mainly caused damage to corn and bean crops.							
EF0	S of Kokomo	Howard	IN	40.4038°N 86.1562°W	2316–2321	2.95 mi (4.75 km)	75 yd (69 m)	$15,500
EF0	The tornado bent a road sign and caused damage to a billboard and trees.							
EF0	SE of Liberty Center	Henry	OH	41.4342°N 83.9518°W	2319–2320	0.01 mi (0.016 km)	20 yd (18 m)	$0
EF0	A tornado briefly touched down in a field and damaged crops.							
EF0	Dupont	Putnam	OH	41.0479°N 84.3071°W	2326–2329	1.23 mi (1.98 km)	25 yd (23 m)	$0
EF0	The tornado moved directly through Dupont, damaging trees, roofs, siding, and crops and lifted water from the Auglaize River.							
EF0	NE of Continental	Putnam, Henry	OH	41.1678°N 84.1814°W	2348–2350	0.64 mi (1.03 km)	15 yd (14 m)	$0
EF0	A very brief tornado caused little damage.							
EF0	SW of Pemberville	Wood	OH	41.3591°N 83.5246°W	0106	0.04 mi (0.064 km)	20 yd (18 m)	$35,000
EF0	The tornado touched down and immediately lifted. A storage building lost much of its sheet metal roof, with debris carried into nearby trees.							

=== August 25 event ===
List of confirmed tornadoes – Thursday, August 25, 2016
EF#	Location	County / Parish	State	Start Coord.	Time (UTC)	Path length	Max width	Damage (2016 USD)
EF0	Renfrew	Butler	PA	40.7795°N 80.028°W	0143–0144	2.08 mi (3.35 km)	350 yd (320 m)	$5,000
EF0	The tornado broke and uprooted hardwood trees and snapped a pine tree. Several outbuildings lost shingles. The soundboard for a natural gas wells was dislodged. Corn stalks were flattened.							

=== August 26 event ===
List of confirmed tornadoes – Friday, August 26, 2016
EF#	Location	County / Parish	State	Start Coord.	Time (UTC)	Path length	Max width	Damage (2016 USD)
EF0	SE of Panguitch	Garfield	UT	37.8°N 112.41°W	1935	0.34 mi (0.55 km)	5 yd (4.6 m)	$0
EF0	Members of the public photographed a brief tornado.							
EF0	Lathrop	Clinton	MO	39.55°N 94.39°W	0025–0035	3.27 mi (5.26 km)	25 yd (23 m)	$2,000
EF0	Tree limbs and a few power lines were damaged.							

=== August 27 event ===
List of confirmed tornadoes – Saturday, August 27, 2016
EF#	Location	County / Parish	State	Start Coord.	Time (UTC)	Path length	Max width	Damage (2016 USD)
EF0	SSW of Arvilla	Grand Forks	ND	47.86°N 97.49°W	2112–2114	0.5 mi (0.80 km)	100 yd (91 m)	Unknown
EF0	A brief tornado moved across open fields.							
EF1	SSW of Emerado	Grand Forks	ND	47.8500°N 97.4800°W	2118–2132	4.0 mi (6.4 km)	600 yd (550 m)	Unknown
EF1	A large tornado snapped or uprooted numerous trees along its path and completely destroyed a small barn. Debris and small trailers were spread over a broad area.							
EF3	N of Hillsboro	Traill	ND	47.49°N 97.1°W	2302–2310	3.0 mi (4.8 km)	300 yd (270 m)	Unknown
EF3	The tornado destroyed a two-car garage and snapped or uprooted numerous trees at a farmstead. Grain bins were destroyed or had their tops ripped off, and the legs of a grain elevator complex were toppled. Half of an engineered metal building was demolished, and an office had roofing torn off. A well-constructed house lost its roof and sections of its walls caved in.							

=== August 28 event ===
List of confirmed tornadoes – Sunday, August 28, 2016
EF#	Location	County / Parish	State	Start Coord.	Time (UTC)	Path length	Max width	Damage (2016 USD)
EF0	N of Azalia	Monroe	MI	42.0363°N 83.6665°W	1652–1653	0.13 mi (0.21 km)	25 yd (23 m)	$0
EF0	Tornado touched down over an open field and caused no damage.							
EF0	W of Coggon	Linn	IA	42.2801°N 91.5849°W	2133	0.1 mi (0.16 km)	10 yd (9.1 m)	$0
EF0	Brief tornado caused no damage.							
EF0	SW of Greenview	Polk	MN	47.62°N 96.58°W	0102–0105	0.75 mi (1.21 km)	100 yd (91 m)	Unknown
EF0	Tornado touched down over an open field.							
EF0	SE of Beltrami	Polk	MN	47.54°N 96.51°W	0114–0115	0.2 mi (0.32 km)	75 yd (69 m)	Unknown
EF0	A rope tornado moved across open fields.							
EF2	NE of Gary	Norman	MN	47.5°N 96.41°W	0204–0308	9.57 mi (15.40 km)	400 yd (370 m)	Unknown
EF2	A multiple-vortex tornado snapped, uprooted, and damaged hundreds of trees. A barn was completely destroyed, power poles were snapped, and two homes sustained roof and wall damage.							

=== August 29 event ===
List of confirmed tornadoes – Monday, August 29, 2016
EF#	Location	County / Parish	State	Start Coord.	Time (UTC)	Path length	Max width	Damage (2016 USD)
EFU	W of Silverton	Briscoe	TX	34.4713°N 101.4581°W	1931–1937	0.61 mi (0.98 km)	50 yd (46 m)	$0
EFU	A motorist photographed a tornado.							
EF0	NE of Cimarron	Gray	KS	37.83°N 100.3°W	2312–2320	0.24 mi (0.39 km)	50 yd (46 m)	$0
EF0	Numerous citizens observed a landspout tornado.							

== See also ==
- Tornadoes of 2016
- List of United States tornadoes from April to May 2016
- List of United States tornadoes from September to December 2016
