= Jones Chapel, Alabama =

Unincorporated community in Alabama, United States

- Unincorporated community
- Location within Alabama Location within the United States
- Coordinates: 34°12′37″N 87°03′07″W
- Country: United States
- State: Alabama
- County: Cullman
- Elevation: 981 ft (299 m)
- Time zone: UTC-6 (Central (CST))
  - Summer (DST): UTC-5 (CDT)
- Area codes: 256 & 938
- GNIS feature ID: 159870

Jones Chapel is an unincorporated community in Cullman County, Alabama, United States, located on Alabama State Route 74, 13.1 miles (21.1 km) west-northwest of Cullman.

== History ==
Jones Chapel is named after a local church, which itself was named in honor of "Turkeytail" Jones, an early settler of the area. Turkeytail Jones owned, and operated a trading post at the center of the community. He traded goods with the local Native American tribes for furs.

A post office operated under the name Jones Chapel from 1868 to 1907.
