= Starkville–Columbus combined statistical area =

Coordinates: 33.563920°N 88.500891°W

Golden Triangle Area
- Combined Statistical Area
- Starkville–Columbus, MS; Combined Statistical Area
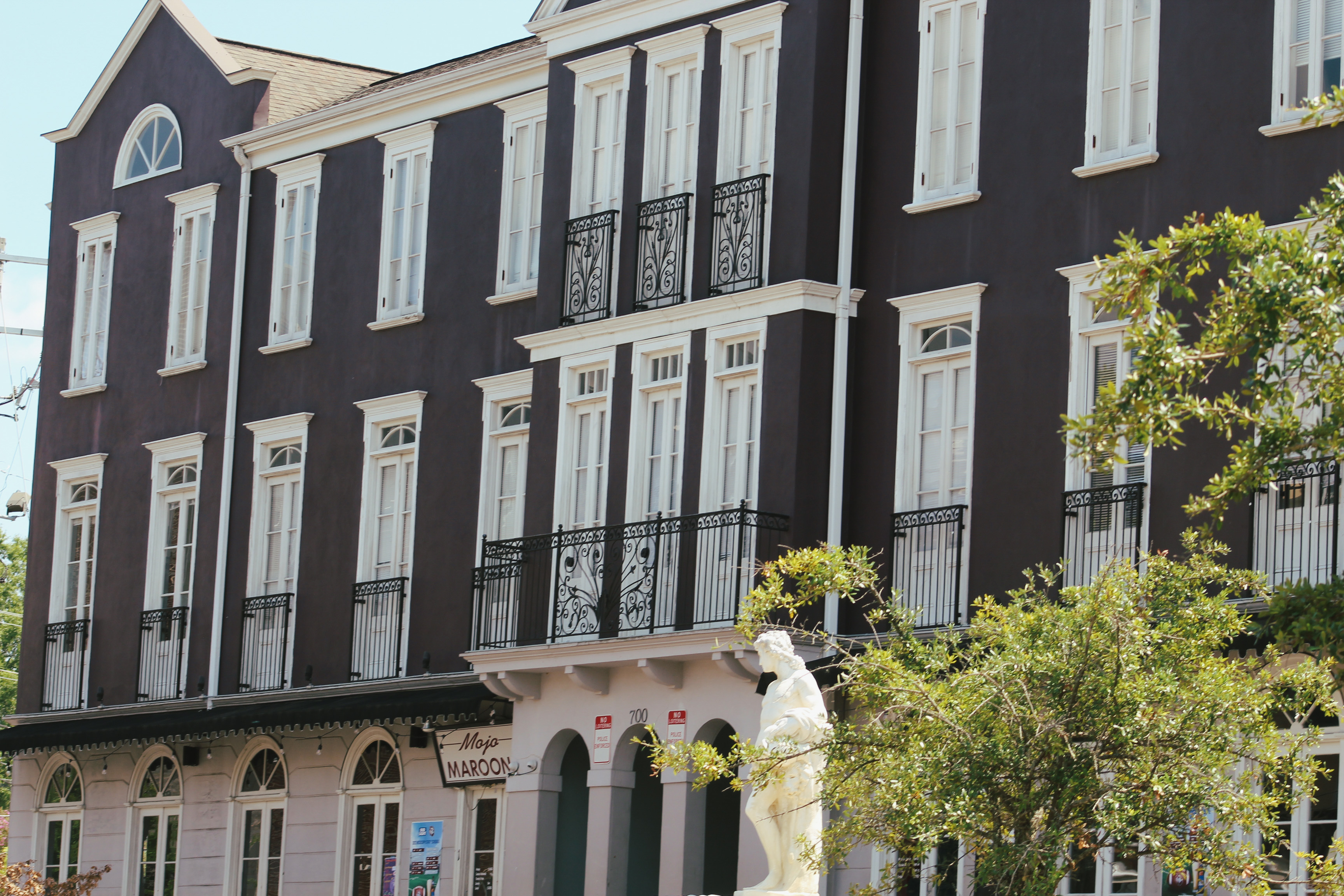
- Cotton District in Starkville
Interactive Map of Starkville–Columbus, MS CSA
City of Columbus
Columbus, MS µSA
City of Starkville
Starkville, MS µSA
- Country: United States
- State: Mississippi
- Principal cities: Columbus; Starkville
- Time zone: UTC-6 (CST)
  - Summer (DST): UTC-5 (CDT)

The Starkville–Columbus, MS Combined Statistical Area was formerly known as Columbus–West Point was defined as consisting of Clay and Lowndes counties in northeastern Mississippi, which were separately treated as the West Point Micropolitan Statistical Area and Columbus Micropolitan Statistical Area, respectively. As of the 2000 census, the CSA had a population of 83,565.

The metropolitan area delineations published by the Office of Management and Budget in February 2013 no longer include Clay County as a micropolitan statistical area and they no longer treat the two counties as a combined statistical area. When the 2023 core-based statistical areas were defined, the Columbus micropolitan area and the Starkville micropolitan area were combined, and the West Point micropolitan area was no longer defined

== Counties ==
- Lowndes
- Noxubee
- Oktibbeha
- Webster

== Incorporated places ==
- Artesia
- Caledonia
- Columbus (principal city)
- Crawford
- New Hope
- Starkville (principal city)

== Unincorporated places ==
- Bent Oak
- Billups
- Flint Hill
- Forreston
- Kolola Springs
- Mayhew
- McCrary
- Penns
- Plum Grove
- Steens
- Trinity
- Wells
- Whitebury
- Woodlawn

== Demographics ==
As of the census of 2000, there were 83,565 people, 31,001 households, and 22,290 families residing within the CSA. The racial makeup of the CSA was 52.88% White, 45.44% African American, 0.14% Native American, 0.44% Asian, 0.02% Pacific Islander, 0.34% from other races, and 0.74% from two or more races. Hispanic or Latino of any race were 1.05% of the population.

The median income for a household in the CSA was $29,748, and the median income for a family was $36,855. Males had a median income of $30,915 versus $20,057 for females. The per capita income for the CSA was $15,513.

== See also ==
- Mississippi census statistical areas
- List of metropolitan areas in Mississippi
- List of micropolitan areas in Mississippi
- List of cities in Mississippi
- List of towns and villages in Mississippi
- List of census-designated places in Mississippi
- List of United States metropolitan areas
