= U.S. Route 45 Alternate =

U.S. Highway in Mississippi

U.S. Highway 45 Alternate

Route information
- Maintained by MDOT
- Length: 62.9 mi (101.2 km)
- Existed: 1968–present

Major junctions
- South end: US 45 in Brooksville
- US 82 / MS 12 / MS 25 in Mayhew; MS 50 in West Point; MS 8 near Gibson; MS 41 near Okolona
- North end: US 45 / US 278 / MS 145 in Shannon

Location
- Country: United States
- State: Mississippi
- Counties: Noxubee, Lowndes, Clay, Monroe, Chickasaw, Lee

Highway system
- United States Numbered Highway System; List; Special; Divided; Mississippi State Highway System; Interstate; US; State
← US 45	→ MS 46

U.S. Route 45 Alternate (US 45 Alternate, also signed as US 45A) is a 62.9-mile-long (101.2 km) alternate route of US 45 in northeastern Mississippi, running from Brooksville, through West Point, to Shannon, which lies just south of Tupelo. Excluding the route through West Point, the entire length of US 45 Alternate is a four-lane divided expressway, with interchanges at most major junctions.

It is one of only two signed special routes of any U.S. Highway within the entire state of Mississippi, with the rest being signed as normal state highways. The other instance is US-49E and US-49W in the delta region of western Mississippi.

== Route description ==
US 45 Alternate begins in northern Noxubee County at an interchange with US 45 in Brooksville. It heads northwest to bypass downtown as a divided highway to have an intersection MS 388 before leaving Brooksville and heading through rural farmland for several miles to enter Lowndes County.

US 45 Alternate enters the Golden Triangle region as it bypasses Crawford along its east side, with MS 245 passing through the center of town, before traveling through Penns and Artesia. The highway now passes through Mayhew, where it has a RIRO style interchange with MS 182, as well as have a large interchange US 82/MS 12, where it becomes concurrent with MS 25. US 45 Alternate/MS 25 continue north for a couple more miles to enter Clay County.

US 45 Alternate/MS 25 pass through Tibbee, where they cross a bridge over Tibbee Creek, before entering the West Point city limits. The highway becomes an undivided four-lane boulevard and passes north through a business district and neighborhoods, where it has an intersection with MS 50 (Main Street) on the west side of downtown. US 45 Alternate/MS 25 pass through another business district before leaving West Point and widening to a divided highway. The highway now leaves the Golden Triangle and enters Monroe County.

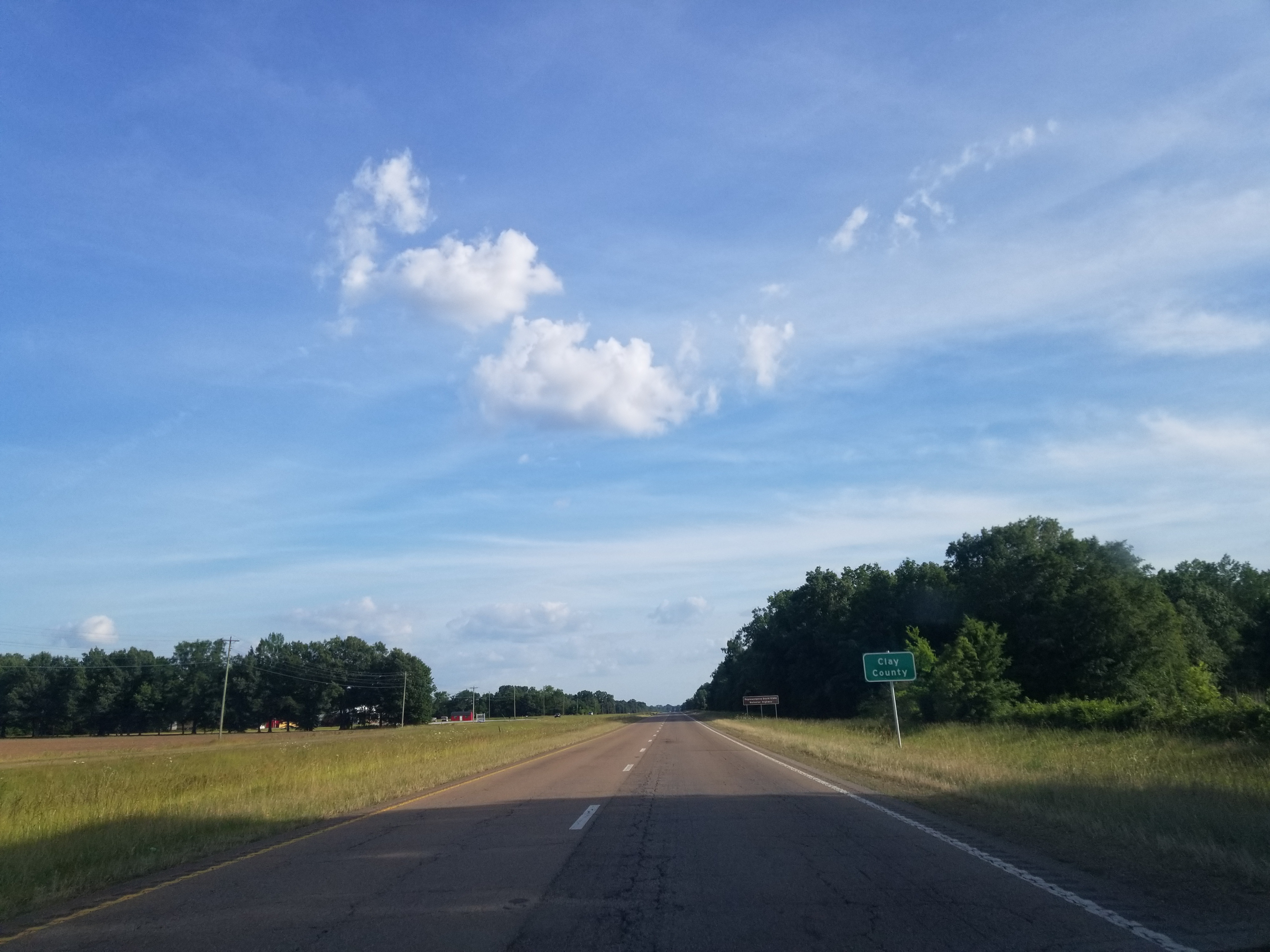
US 45 Alternate southbound entering Clay County, MS

MS 25 splits off toward Aberdeen at an interchange in Muldon, and US 45 Alternate continues north through farmland to have an intersection with MS 382, as well as an interchange with MS 8, before briefly crossing into Chickasaw County, where it passes through Egypt and meets the southern end of the second section of MS 245. US 45 Alternate now re-enters Monroe County as it bypasses Okolona on its east side, where it has an interchange with MS 41. The highway now crosses Tubbalubba Creek to enter Pine Grove, where it enters Lee County at an intersection with Pine Grove Road.

US 45 Alternate crosses Chiwapa Creek to enter the Shannon city limits, with the highway coming to an end shortly thereafter at an interchange between US 45, US 278, and MS 145, with the highway continuing north (as a freeway) into Tupelo (and on to I-22) as US 45.

== History ==
Mississippi Highway 23
- Location: Brooksville - Shannon
- Existed: 1932–1940

Mississippi Highway 45W
- Location: Brooksville - Shannon
- Existed: 1940–1968

The MS 23 designation was used for what is now US 45 Alternate from 1932 to 1940. The routing was from Starkville to Shannon when it was first designated. The section from Shannon to Okolona was paved by 1937. The next year, six miles (9.7 km) of the route was paved from West Point southwards. MS 25 was extended south in 1939, replacing all of MS 23 from Starkville to north of West Point. The MS 23 designation was replaced with the Mississippi Highway 45W (MS 45W) one by 1940. MS 45W was renumbered in 1968 to US 45 Alternate, its current designation.

In 1998, a bypass around Okolona was opened, and US 45 Alt. was rerouted onto the newly constructed divided highway. This was planned as part of the 1987 Four-Lane Highway Program, and the section cost $18.7 million. MS 245 was the designation for US 45 Alt.'s old alignment, from Okolona to Shannon. In 2007, more parts of US 45 Alt. were upgraded to a four-lane highway, and Crawford was bypassed as a result, with MS 245 being designated along the old route through town.

== Major intersections ==
County	Location	mi	km	Destinations	Notes
Noxubee	Brooksville	0.0	0.0	US 45 south – Meridian	Southern terminus; interchange; southbound exit and northbound entrance, no access to US 45 north from US 45 Alternate south or no access to US 45 Alternate north from US 45 south
Noxubee	Brooksville	0.6	0.97	MS 388 east to US 45 north – Pickensville, Columbus	Western terminus of MS 388; provides access to US 45 north
Noxubee	Brooksville	0.6	0.97	Old Highway 45 (MS 852 south) - Brooksville	Northern terminus of unsigned MS 852
Lowndes	Crawford	4.6	7.4	MS 245 north – Crawford	Southern terminus of southern segment of MS 245
Lowndes	Crawford	6.1	9.8	MS 245 south – Crawford	Northern terminus of southern segment of MS 245
Lowndes	Artesia	13.4	21.6	MS 788 east (W Artesia Road) – Artesia	Western terminus of MS 788
Lowndes	Mayhew	17.7	28.5	MS 182 – East Mississippi Community College Golden Triangle Campus	RIRO style interchange
Lowndes	Mayhew	18.1– 18.6	29.1– 29.9	US 82 / MS 12 / MS 25 south – Starkville, Columbus	Interchange; southern end of MS 25 concurrency
Clay	West Point	26.7	43.0	MS 50 (Main Street) – Columbus, Pheba, Waverly Plantation	
Monroe	Muldon	34.2– 34.8	55.0– 56.0	MS 25 north – Aberdeen	Northern end of MS 25 concurrency; interchange
Monroe		40.0	64.4	MS 382 east – Prairie	Western terminus of MS 382
Monroe		42.8– 43.5	68.9– 70.0	MS 8 – Houston, Aberdeen	Interchange
Chickasaw		49.7	80.0	MS 245 north – Okolona	Southern terminus of northern segment of MS 245
Monroe		54.8– 55.4	88.2– 89.2	MS 41 to MS 32 – Okolona, Amory	Interchange
Lee	Shannon	62.9	101.2	US 45 / US 278 / MS 145 north to I-22 – Nettleton	Northern terminus; interchange; southern terminus of Shannon-Booneville segment MS 145
1.000 mi = 1.609 km; 1.000 km = 0.621 mi: Concurrency terminus; Incomplete access
