= Mississippi Highway 245 =

State Highway in Mississippi

Mississippi Highway 245
- Various sections of MS 245 highlighted

Route information
- Maintained by MDOT
- Length: 15.302 mi (24.626 km)
- Existed: c. 1998–present

Crawford section
- Length: 1.50 mi (2.41 km)
- South end: US 45 Alt. east of Crawford
- North end: US 45 Alt. in Crawford

Okolona–Shannon section
- Length: 13.80 mi (22.21 km)
- South end: US 45 Alt. south of Okolona
- North end: MS 145 in Shannon

Location
- Country: United States
- State: Mississippi
- Counties: Lowndes, Chickasaw, Lee

Highway system
- Mississippi State Highway System; Interstate; US; State
← I-220	→ US 278

Mississippi Highway 245 (MS 245) is a state highway located in the U.S. state of Mississippi. It is the designation for two separate sections of the old U.S. Route 45 Alternate (US 45 Alt.) that the state continues to maintain. The Crawford section, designated in 2007, runs south to north from US 45 Alt. back to US 45 Alt. in Lowndes County. The other section's southern terminus is at US 45 Alt. south of Okolona in Chickasaw County and the northern terminus is at MS 145 in Shannon in Lee County. Along the way this section intersects MS 41 and the eastern terminus of MS 32 in Okolona. The section from Chickasaw County to Lee County was designated in 1998, after the completion of a four-lane bypass for US 45 Alt..

== Route description ==
Traffic volume on Mississippi Highway 245
Location	Volume
Southeast of Mill Street	180
North of CRD 154	1,600
North of Filgo Road	2,400
South of MS 32/MS 41	5,000
South of West Drive	5,100
South of Winter Avenue	3,500
South of CRD 136	2,800
North of CRD 54	3,700
North of Cowden Street	6,600
Data was measured in 2018 in terms of AADT; Source:

MS 245 is located in Lowndes, Chickasaw, and Lee counties. The route is legally defined in Mississippi Code § 65-3-3, and it is maintained by Mississippi Department of Transportation (MDOT) as part of the Mississippi State Highway System.

In Lowndes County, MS 245 starts at its intersection with US 45 Alt., and it begins traveling northwestwards. After passing through a small area of trees, the road intersects Main Street and Tarlton Road, entering the city limits of the town. It then passes under a railroad and enters the outskirts of Crawford. MS 245 intersects multiple streets as it turns north towards US 45 Alt.. North of Long Street, the road begins to bend northeastwards, and it soon ends at US 45 Alt.

In Chickasaw County, MS 245 starts at US 45 Alt. south of Egypt. The road begins traveling northwestwards through farmland, intersecting County Roads 410 and 155 (CRD 410 and CRD 155, respectively). North of CRD 252, the route crosses Jolly Creek. MS 245 turns north at CRD 149 and enters Okolona at Filgo Road. Inside the city, the road is known as Church Street, and it enters travels through the residential areas around it. MS 245 meets MS 41 and the western terminus of MS 32 at Monroe Avenue. North of Okolona Elementary School, the road intersects Main Street, which leads to downtown Okolona. On the northern side of the city, MS 245 intersects the entrance to Okolona High School, and it leaves the city limits north of Raspberry Drive. The road turns northeastwards at that point, and it begins traveling through farmland. South of CRD 136, the route crosses over Tallabinnela Creek, and it enters Lee County at CRD 139. The road crosses the Tubbalubba Creek north of the intersection, and Chiwapa Creek north of CRD 506. Past Chiwapa Creek, MS 245 enters Shannon, and it is known as Romie Hill Avenue. The road intersects the entrance of Shannon Elementary School at Mobley Street. The route ends at MS 145 (Noah Curtis Street), and the road continues as MS 145.

== History ==
The sections that became part of MS 245 were previous part of several older designations. The first two designations, MS 23 and MS 25, were given by 1932, for a gravel road from Starkville to Shannon, and a gravel road from Macon to Tennessee–Mississippi state line, respectively. The section of MS 23 from Okolona to Shannon was paved by 1937. By 1939, the section of MS 25 from Brooksville to Mayhew was paved. Both designations were replaced by MS 45W around 1940. MS 45W was renumbered to US 45 Alt. by 1968.

In 1998, a bypass around Okolona was opened, and US 45 Alt. was rerouted onto the newly constructed divided highway. This was planned as part of the 1987 Four-Lane Highway Program, and the section cost $18.7 million. MS 245 was the designation for US 45 Alt.'s old alignment, from Okolona to Shannon. In 2007, more parts of US 45 Alt. were upgraded to a four-lane highway, and Crawford was bypassed as a result.

== Major intersections ==
County	Location	mi	km	Destinations	Notes
Lowndes		0.00	0.00	US 45 Alt.	Southern terminus
Lowndes	Crawford	1.50	2.41	US 45 Alt.	Northern terminus
Gap in route
Chickasaw		1.50	2.41	US 45 Alt. – Tupelo, West Point	Southern terminus
Chickasaw	Okolona	6.50	10.46	MS 32 west / MS 41 – Pontotoc, Amory	Eastern terminus of MS 32
Lee	Shannon	15.30	24.62	MS 145	Northern terminus
1.000 mi = 1.609 km; 1.000 km = 0.621 mi
