= Linton Landrum =

American politician (1857–1909)

Linton D. Landrum (28 July 1857 – 10 April 1909) was a lawyer and state legislator in Mississippi. In 1890 he was sworn in to represent Lowndes County, Mississippi in the Mississippi House of Representatives. He lived in Columbus, Mississippi. He chaired the Liquor Committee.
