= Plum Grove =

Plum Grove can refer to:

United States

- Plum Grove, Kansas, a ghost town
- Plum Grove, Mississippi, an unincorporated community
- Plum Grove, Texas, a city
- Plum Grove Historic House in Iowa City, Iowa
- Plum Grove, Illinois, now known as Rolling Meadows, Illinois
- Plum Grove Junior High School, a junior high school in Rolling Meadows, Illinois.
