= Forreston =

Forreston may refer to:

Australia

- Forreston, South Australia

United States

- Forreston, Illinois
- Forreston, Mississippi
- Forreston, Texas
