= Penns =

Penns may refer to:

- Penns, Mississippi, a village in Lowndes County
- Penns Grove, New Jersey, a borough in Salem County
- Penns Hall, a hotel and country club in England
- Penns railway station, a former station in the West Midlands, England
- Penns, a frazione of Sagron Mis

In Pennsylvania:

- Penns Creek, a tributary of the Susquehanna River
- Penns Creek, Pennsylvania, a village in Snyder County
- Penn's Landing, the waterfront area of the Center City along the Delaware River section of Philadelphia
