= Moores Bluff, Mississippi =

- Ghost town
- Location within the state of Mississippi Moores Bluff (the United States)
- Coordinates: 33°20′59″N 88°23′52″W
- Country: United States
- State: Mississippi
- County: Lowndes
- Elevation: 138 ft (42 m)
- Time zone: UTC-6 (Central (CST))
  - Summer (DST): UTC-5 (CDT)
- GNIS feature ID: 687866

Moores Bluff is a ghost town in Lowndes County, Mississippi, United States.

Located on the west bank of the Tombigbee River, the town was an important trading point for cotton during the early history of the county, and shipping receipts have been located from the early 1840s.

The road leading to Moores Bluff from the west was known as the "Cotton Road", and at times "was thronged with wagons loaded with cotton and plantation supplies". Two large brick warehouses were located there, and thousands of bales of cotton were shipped annually by boat from Moores Bluff.

The construction of the Mobile and Ohio Railroad in the 1890s greatly reduced shipping along the river, and the town became extinct.

Moores Bluff is today located on an uninhabited and inaccessible point in the river.
