= Lynching of Nevlin Porter and Johnson Spencer =

African Americans who were lynched in the U.S.

Nevlin Porter and Johnson Spencer were African-American men who were lynched in Starkville, Mississippi May 5, 1879, for the alleged burning of a barn.

== History ==
On April 23, 1879, Jordan Moore, a farmer who lived near Starkville, reported being shot at by an unknown stranger. On April 24 a barn containing corn on Moore's property was burned, and a black man, Johnson Spencer was arrested. The following day, while Spencer was incarcerated, another barn containing farm implements and other machinery was burned, and Moore reported finding another black man, Nevlin Porter, in his bedroom. Porter confessed to burning the barn in order to divert attention from Spencer's guilt. Reports in the press stated that Porter had been lynched on the way to the jail proved false as of April 30, but was scheduled for a hearing in circuit court on May 1. However, on May 5, 1879, a mixed-race mob of 121 men were given keys to the jail by the sheriff. The mob locked jailer Henry Isaacs up, and left with Porter and Spencer to the trestle of the Mobile and Ohio Railroad one mile east of the town, where both men were hung with cotton ropes and killed. After an inquest the bodies were turned over to their friends.
