= Bent Oak, Mississippi =

Unincorporated community in Mississippi, United States

- Unincorporated community
- Location within the state of Mississippi Bent Oak (the United States)
- Coordinates: 33°26′19″N 88°32′34″W
- Country: United States
- State: Mississippi
- County: Lowndes
- Elevation: 240 ft (73 m)
- Time zone: UTC-6 (Central (CST))
  - Summer (DST): UTC-5 (CDT)
- Area code: 662
- GNIS feature ID: 666833

Bent Oak is an unincorporated community in Lowndes County, Mississippi. According to the United States Geological Survey, variant names are Cobbs Switch, Bentoak, and Cobbs.

== History ==
In July 1859, the Mobile and Ohio Railroad built a branch from its main line in Artesia, Mississippi to the bank of the Tombigbee River west of Columbus, Mississippi. The route passed through Bent Oak, then called Cobbs. A switch was built at Cobbs.

A post office called Cobb's Switch was opened in 1876 until 1898, when it was renamed to Bentoak.

In 1900, Bent Oak's population was 75. The community was once home to a cotton gin.

A post office operated under the name Bentoak from 1898 to 1908.
