= Elzy Richards =

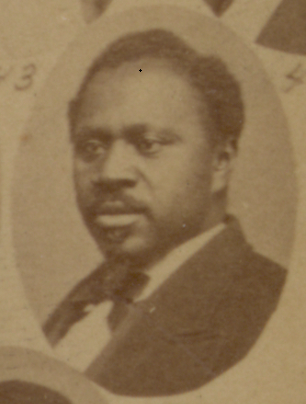

Elzy A. Richards was a state legislator in Mississippi.

He represented Lowndes County, Mississippi in the Mississippi House of Representatives from 1872 to 1875.

== See also ==
- African American officeholders from the end of the Civil War until before 1900
