= Moon Mullens =

American jazz musician

Moon Edward Mullens (May 11, 1916, Mayhew, Mississippi – April 7, 1977) was an American jazz trumpeter.

Mullens was raised in Chicago and played there locally early in his career, including with Half Pint Jaxon. He moved to New York City and played with Chris Columbus before joining Hot Lips Page's band in 1938, where he first recorded. He played with Earl Bostic, Columbus again (1941), and Benny Carter before serving in the military during World War II. After the war he played with Louis Armstrong (1946–47), Cab Calloway, Joe Thomas, and with Lionel Hampton on and off between 1949 and 1959. From 1959 to 1961 he worked with Duke Ellington, then left music permanently, setting up a photography business. He never recorded as a leader.
