= Billups, Mississippi =

Unincorporated community in Mississippi, United States

- Unincorporated community
- Location within the state of Mississippi Billups (the United States)
- Coordinates: 33°25′50″N 88°35′06″W
- Country: United States
- State: Mississippi
- County: Lowndes
- Elevation: 226 ft (69 m)
- Time zone: UTC-6 (Central (CST))
  - Summer (DST): UTC-5 (CDT)
- Area code: 662
- GNIS feature ID: 691704

Billups is an unincorporated community in Lowndes County, Mississippi.

Billups is located west of Columbus and just south of Golden Triangle Regional Airport. According to the United States Geological Survey, variant names are Billups Gate and Billups Station.

Billups is the site of the former 2,000 acre plantation of Colonel Thomas C. Billups.

Billups was a flag stop on the Mobile and Ohio Railroad. The first oil well in Lowndes County was drilled in Billups in 1921 and gravel and logs were shipped from the community.

A post office operated under the name Billups from 1901 to 1906.
