= Mississippi Highway 382 =

Highway in Mississippi

Mississippi Highway 382
- MS 382 highlighted in pink

Route information
- Maintained by MDOT
- Length: 6.494 mi (10.451 km)
- Existed: c. 1958–present

Major junctions
- West end: US 45 Alt. near Prairie
- East end: MS 25 near Aberdeen

Location
- Country: United States
- State: Mississippi
- Counties: Monroe

Highway system
- Mississippi State Highway System; Interstate; US; State
← MS 373	→ MS 385

Mississippi Highway 382 (MS 382) is a state highway in eastern Mississippi. The route starts at U.S. Route 45 Alternate (US 45 Alt.) near Prairie and travels eastward. The road travels through farmland as it reaches Prairie. MS 382 then ends at MS 25 near Aberdeen. The road was constructed around 1951 from MS 45W (now US 45 Alt.) west of Prairie to US 45 in Aberdeen, and it was designated by 1958. The eastern terminus was changed to MS 25 from US 45 by 1967.

== Route description ==
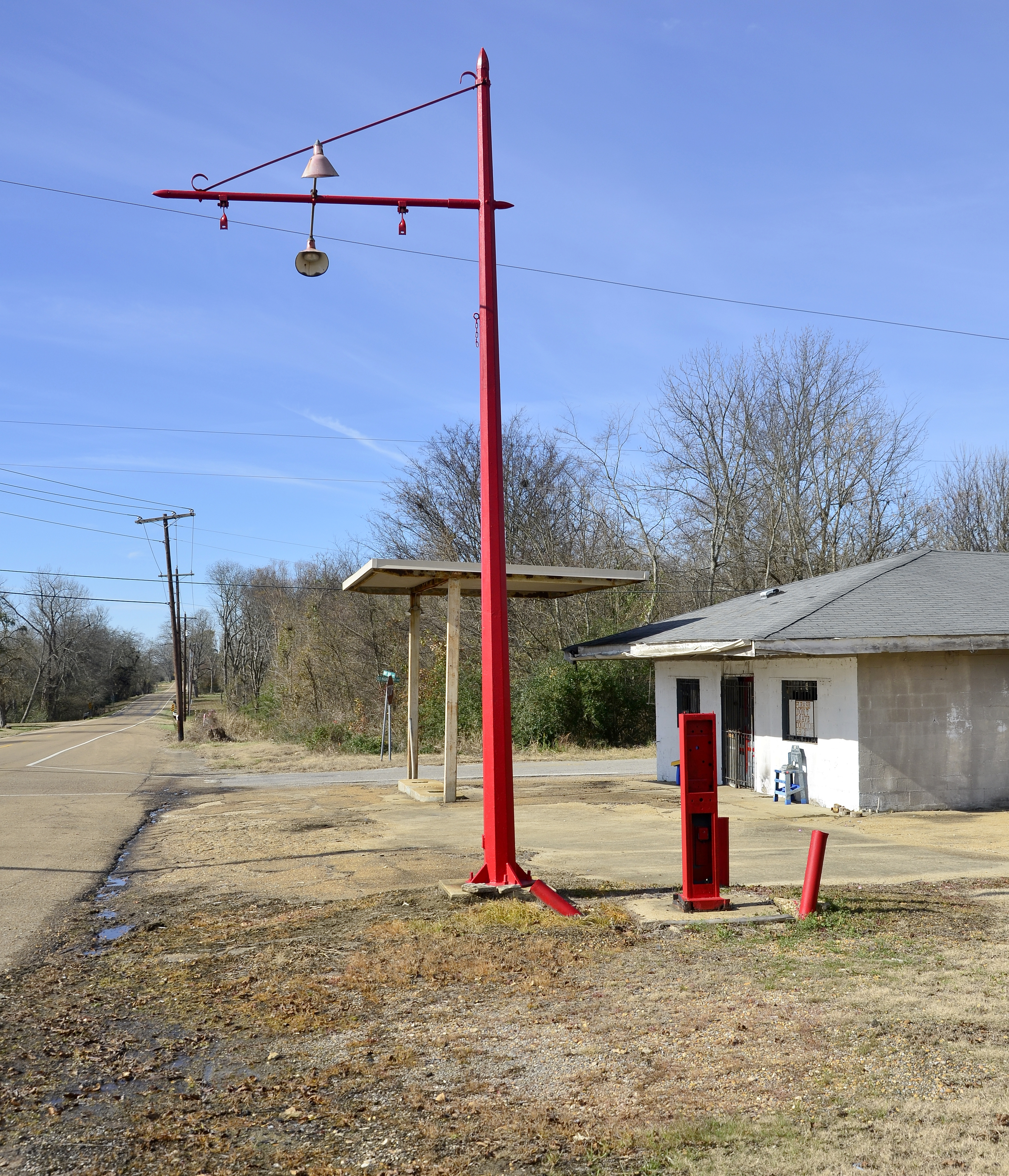
Abandoned gas station on MS 382 in Prairie

All of the route is located in Monroe County. In 2017, the Mississippi Department of Transportation (MDOT) calculated as many as 1,200 vehicles traveling on MS 382 west of Old Magnolia Highway, and as few as 910 vehicles traveling west of Chips Lane. This is expressed in terms of annual average daily traffic (AADT), a measure of traffic volume for any average day of the year. MS 382 is legally defined in Mississippi Code § 65-3-3, and all of it is maintained by the Mississippi Department of Transportation (MDOT), as part of the Mississippi State Highway System.

MS 382 starts at the intersection of US 45 Alt. and Evans Road west of the unincorporated area of Prairie, and it travels eastward. The route travels through farmland and intersects Baptist Grove Road. The road intersects Old Magnolia Highway in Prairie, and it crosses the Kansas City Southern Railway near Railroad Circle. Near Water Tank Road, MS 382 crosses Hang Kettle Creek. The route continues eastward until it ends at MS 25 near Aberdeen. The road continues as Prairie Road, which ends at a dead end near James Creek.

== History ==
Around 1951, a hard-surfaced road was constructed from MS 45W to US 45 through Prairie, and it was signed as MS 382 by 1958. Around eight years later, MS 25 was extended southwestwards to MS 45W, and MS 382's eastern terminus was relocated to MS 25. MS 45W was renumbered to US 45 Alt. by 1968.

== Major intersections ==
The entire route is in Monroe County.

Location	mi	km	Destinations	Notes
	0.000	0.000	US 45 Alt. – West Point, Tupelo	Western terminus
	6.494	10.451	MS 25 – Aberdeen, West Point	Eastern terminus
1.000 mi = 1.609 km; 1.000 km = 0.621 mi
