= Nashville, Mississippi =

- Ghost town
- Location within Mississippi Location within the United States
- Coordinates: 33°19′35″N 88°19′25″W
- Country: United States
- State: Mississippi
- County: Lowndes
- Elevation: 151 ft (46 m)
- Time zone: UTC-6 (Central (CST))
  - Summer (DST): UTC-5 (CDT)
- GNIS feature ID: 687875

Nashville is a ghost town in Lowndes County, Mississippi, United States.

Located 1.4 mi (2.3 km) west of the Alabama state line, on the east bank of the Tombigbee River, Nashville was once an important shipping port and river crossing location.

== History ==
The site was settled by Daniel Young, a blacksmith, in 1824, and the place became known as "Young's Bluff".

In 1833, a road was constructed west from Young's Bluff to intersect the Robinson Road (which connected the cities of Columbus, Jackson, and Natchez, and is the second oldest road in Mississippi), and another was constructed east into Alabama. Road traffic passed through the community and then crossed the river on a ferry owned by Young.

Another early settler, Nimrod N. Nash, opened a store there, and then purchased Young's property in 1834. He renamed the town "Nashville", and sold lots to settlers.

In addition to the successful ferry service, Nashville's stores supplied local farmers with goods, it had a post office established in 1837, and its port had facilities to store cotton until steamboats arrived in the late autumn-early winter, when water level would rise. Despite this, Nashville never experienced significant growth, and the town did not incorporate. It never had more than two stores, and in census of 1840, the population was about 55 whites, and an undetermined number of slaves.

== Decline ==
A river flood devastated the low-lying town in 1847, and by 1850, there was one store left. The post office closed in 1852, and the Nashville voting precinct ended the following year. Many of the homes were soon abandoned.

Nashville continued to serve as a minor shipping port until the Civil War, and the Nashville Ferry continued to operate until between 1967 and 1973.

The river at this site is now part of the Tennessee–Tombigbee Waterway, and numerous cottages line the east bank. A private boat launch known as "Nashville Ferry" is located there, and roads leading to the waterway on both shores are named "Nashville Ferry Road".
