= James Gilreath =

American singer (1936–2003)

James William Gilreath (November 14, 1936 – September 7, 2003) was an American pop singer and songwriter, whose single "Little Band of Gold" went to #21 on the Billboard Hot 100 chart in 1963.

== Career ==
Gilreath was born in Una, Clay County, near Prairie, Mississippi, and began his musical career in the early 1960s as a member of a local area band named 'The Nite-Liters', who recorded an instrumental record entitled "Nervous" in 1962 on the Vee Eight label in Nashville, Tennessee. It was later released by Verve Records headquartered in Los Angeles, California. This recording, composed by Jerry Hood, a band member, featured the trumpet player and co-founder of the band, John Mihelic.

As a musician, Gilreath played both guitar and piano. His first single, in 1962 by Vee Eight Records, contained "I Need It" and "Time Hasn't Helped," but it was not successful. In early 1963, however, "Little Band of Gold" was released, by Statue Records of Tupelo, Mississippi. Gilreath's singing on the record was accompanied by Mihelic and other instrumentalists. The B-side was "I'll Walk With You." Statue Records soon sold the rights to "Little Band of Gold" to Joy Records (New York) of New York City, and by the end of April it had become a hit for that label, reaching #21 on the U.S. pop chart and #19 on the R&B chart. The track reached #29 in the UK Singles Chart.

Three other singles were released by Joy. The first was "Lollipops, Lace, and Lipstick" b/w "Mean Ole River", and the second "Keep Her Out of Sight" b/w "Blue is My Color." In 1965 "Your Day is Coming" b/w "Pearls, Gold, and Silver" was released but was again commercially unsuccessful. The same year the record label had ceased operations, and Gilreath chose to concentrate on songwriting rather than recording records. In 1967, Jimmy Hughes released a single written by Gilreath entitled, "Why Not Tonight," which peaked at #5 R&B.

Beginning in 1963 with Bill Anderson's version, a number of singers covered Gilreath's "Little Band of Gold" hit. In 1966, Vince Hill included it on his album You're My World. In 1969, it was included on an album of instrumentals recorded by Boots Randolph. Also in that year, The Hep Stars released a single featuring the song. In 1977, The Tennessee Guitars included it on an instrumental album, 20 Pieces of Country Gold, and in 1978 it was sung Paul Martin. In 1975, Sonny James recorded "Little Band of Gold," and had a #5 hit on the country music chart.

In 1972 Gilreath married Kay Long, and they lived on a farm at Saltillo, Mississippi, where Gilreath died in a tractor accident on September 7, 2003. He is buried in Lee Memorial Park near Tupelo. He and Kay had no children.

== Sources ==
- Ace Records' promotional discussion of its CD entitled "Teenage Crush, Vol. 3" (2000; 2004). The text, by Rob Finnis, states that among the recordings on the CD is "James Gilreath's infectious 'Little Band of Gold'" (http://www.acerecord.co.uk/content.php?page_id=59&release=740). The CD was produced, recorded and copyrighted in London, UK by Ace Records, LTD. in 2000.
- Bill Anderson, "Still", 33 1/3 rpm album, Decca Records, 1963. "Little Band of Gold" is on Side 1, Track 2.
- Boots Randolph, "Yakety Revisited," 33 1/3 rpm album, Monument Records, 1969. "Little Band of Gold" is the fourth tune on Side 1.
- Brent Coleman, "James Gilreath: A Little Band of Gold." Tombigbee Country Magazine, Aberdeen, Mississippi, April 2008. Despite some errors re the positions to which "Little Band of Gold" advanced in the U.S. and overseas, this article, written thru the memories of several of Gilreaths friends and music colleagues, is interesting and informative.
- Hep Stars, "Little Band of Gold," 45 rpm, Swedish Olga Records, 1969.
- James Gilrath and John Mihelic. 45 rpm. "Little Band of Gold" and "I'll Walk With You" by Gilreath; "Red Wings" and "Cotton Fields" by Mihelic. Sonet Records, Sweden, 1963. A Joy Records Product.
- Jerry Osborne, "The Official Price Guide to Records," 18th Edition. House of Collectibles/Random House, New York City, et al., 2007, pp. 302, 304.
- Jimmy Hughes, "Why Not Tonight?", 45 rpm, Fame Records, 1967, and an LP album entitled "Why Not Tonight?", Atco Records, 1967.
- Joel Whitburn, "The Billboard Book of Top 40 Hits," 1955–2003 (Billboard Books, New York City, 2004), pp. 256, 758.
- Joel Whitburn, "The Billboard Book of Top 40 R & B and Hip-Hop Hits," 1942–2004 (Billboard Books, New York City, 2006), pp. 713, 218, 255, 765.
- John Mihelic, "Red Wings" and "Cotton Fields", 45 rpm, Select Records, Inc. (Joy Records), 1962.
- KTSA Top 66 Survey Week of April 18, 1963, in the San Antonio "Light" newspaper, April 20, 1963. "Little Band of Gold" is No. 1 on this San Antonio, Texas radio station pop chart.
- Mack Allen Smith, "Big Silver Tears," 45 rpm, JAB Records, 1967.
- Mack Allen Smith, "The Skeleton Fight," 45 rpm, Statue Records, 1964. Also included on two of Smith's albums, "The Sound of Mack Allen Smith," Redita Records (Holland), 1979, and "Gotta Rock Tonight," Charly Records (England), 1982. James Gilreath assisted Smith with the recording of the song by singing harmony vocals.
- Mike Hellicar, "New to the Charts/Broken Arm Led to Disc Fame," in New Musical Express, Issue No. 852 (May 10, 1963). London, England.
- "Monster Bop," CD, Dee Jay Records, 1993. "The Skeleton Fight" sung by Mack Allen Smith is Track 8.
- Nite-Liters, "Nervous," 45 rpm, Vee Eight Records, 1962, followed by Verve Records (MGM Records), 1962.
- Obituary of Jimmy Gilreath, in the "Northeast Mississippi Daily Journal [Tupelo]," Sept. 9, 2003. http://www.djournal.com/pages/archive.asp?ID=40600&pub=1&div=News. The obituary states that he died at age 66, which verifies the birth year on his grave marker of 1936. Many sources on the internet erroneoulsly state that his birth year was 1939.
- Paul Martin, "Great Country Gold," 33 1/3 rpm album, Plantation Records, 1978. "Little Band of Gold" is Side 1, Track 5.
- Personal Recollections, 1958-early 1990s, of James R.(Jim) Atkinson, Columbus, Miss. (July 2007).
- Personal Recollections, 1950s-2003, of William (Bill) Sisk of Tupelo, Miss. (August and November, 2007).
- Presidential Records, CD: "The Joy/Select Story: Various Artists, 1956–1965" (London, 2006). Twenty-six pop songs released by Joy Records of New York City. "Little Band of Gold" is Track 12.
- "Saltillo man leaves rich musical legacy," by M. Scott Morris. In the "Northeast Mississippi Daily Journal [Tupelo]," Sept. 9, 2003. http://www.djournal.com/pages/archive.asp?ID=40606&pub=1&div=News.
- Sonny James, "Little Band of Gold," 45 rpm, Columbia Records, 1975.
- Sonny James, "A Little Bit South of Saskatoon," 33 1/3 rpm album, Columbia Records, 1975.
- Sonny James, "The Complete Columbia & Monument Hits," 33 1/3 rpm album, Sony Music Entertainment, 2002. "Little Band of Gold" is Track 8.
- Tennessee Guitars, "20 Pieces of Country Gold," Plantation Records, 1977. "Little Band of Gold" is on Side 1, Track 8.
- Vince Hill, "You're My World," 33 1/3 rpm album, Music for Pleasure Records/EMI Record Co., 1966. "Little Band of Gold" is on Side 2, Track 4.
