= Cadillac Don & J-Money =

American hip hop group

Cadillac Don and J-Money
- Origin: Crawford, Mississippi
- Genres: Hip hop
- Years active: 2006–2022
- Labels: Asylum Records, 35-35 Entertainment
- Members: Donald Sharp; Tiyon Rogers

Cadillac Don (born Donald Sharp) and J-Money (born Tiyon Rogers) were a duo of Southern rap artists. The two grew up in Crawford, Mississippi, United States, listening to blues and R&B but soon were drawn to the more aggressive nature of rap.

Both Cadillac Don and J. Money grew up poor in single parent homes where music such as the blues and R&B took center stage in their lives. As the two childhood friends grew older they gravitated toward hip hop. Cadillac Don lists hip hop stalwarts like Big Daddy Kane as his chief influences while J. Money cites LL Cool J and Tupac Shakur as major influences. Cadillac Don say his love for hip hop was so strong that at the age of six he and his older brother would sneak out the house and hit the streets at night break-dancing in front of adults for money.

Both attended Mississippi Valley State University on baseball scholarships, but an injury sidelined J-Money from trying out for the pros, while Cadillac Don decided to take a job teaching high school art. Initially Cadillac and J were going to be solo rappers, but because they were such good friends they would often do guest appearances on each other’s songs. Under producer Big Fruit’s direction the duo begin to carve out a sound that captured the ears of rap fans throughout North Mississippi. Their sound caught the attention of 35/35 Entertainment’s (part of Asylum Records) CEO Clarence Weatherspoon, a native of Crawford, and Ike Morris of Morris Management Group.

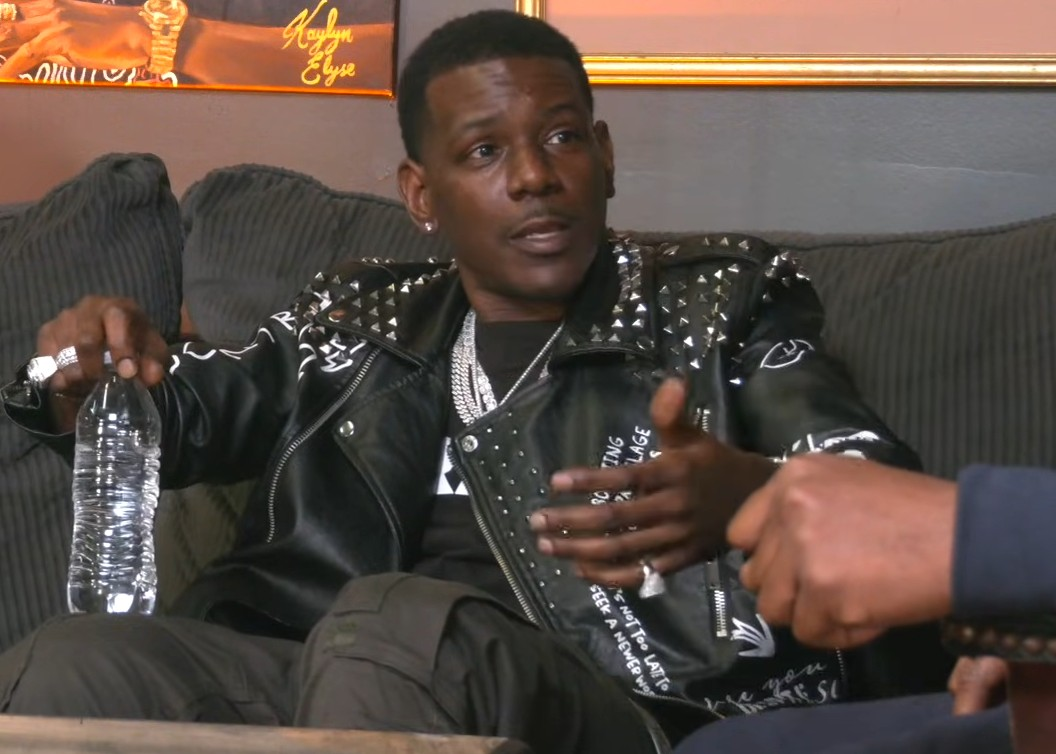
Rogers in 2022, prior to Sharp's death

Sharp died on December 4, 2022.

== Discography ==
- Look at Me (2006) No. 19 US
- My Life Check Me Out (J-Money solo album) (2009) No. 85 Top R&B/Hip-Hop Albums
