= McCrary, Mississippi =

Unincorporated community in Mississippi, United States

- Unincorporated community
- Location within the state of Mississippi McCrary (the United States)
- Coordinates: 33°27′50″N 88°17′01″W
- Country: United States
- State: Mississippi
- County: Lowndes
- Elevation: 276 ft (84 m)
- Time zone: UTC-6 (Central (CST))
  - Summer (DST): UTC-5 (CDT)
- Area code: 662
- GNIS feature ID: 673319

McCrary is an unincorporated community in Lowndes County, Mississippi. McCrary is located southeast of Columbus and northeast of New Hope on the Mississippi/Alabama state line.

McCrary is located on the former Mobile and Ohio Railroad and had a freight and passenger station. The community was once home to a cotton gin and sawmill.

A post office operated under the name McCrary from 1898 to 1910.

Roland McMillan Harper passed through McCrary while documenting the plant life of Mississippi.

It has been postulated that Hernando de Soto crossed into Mississippi from Alabama at McCrary.
