= Shannon, Mississippi =

- Town
- Flag Seal
- Motto: Where good neighbors aren't hard to find
- Location of Shannon, Mississippi

- Location in the United States
- Coordinates: 34°7′1″N 88°42′5″W
- Country: United States
- State: Mississippi
- County: Lee

Government
  - Mayor-Councilship: Paul Lyman

Area
  - Total: 4.05 sq mi (10.49 km^{2})
  - Land: 4.05 sq mi (10.49 km^{2})
  - Water: 0 sq mi (0.00 km^{2})
- Elevation: 256 ft (78 m)

Population (2020)
  - Total: 1,496
  - Density: 369.4/sq mi (142.62/km^{2})
- Time zone: UTC-6 (Central (CST))
  - Summer (DST): UTC-5 (CDT)
- ZIP code: 38868
- Area code: 662
- FIPS code: 28-66720
- GNIS feature ID: 0677612
- Website: www.shannonms.us//

Shannon is a town in Lee County, Mississippi. The population was 1,496 at the 2020 Census.

Shannon is located on Mississippi Highway 145, west of U.S. Route 45. Chiwapa Creek flows south of the town.

== History ==
The town is named for Samuel Shannon, who purchased land at that location from Chickasaw Chief Itawamba in the early 1800s, then built a cabin and a farm. More settlers arrived following the Treaty of Pontotoc, which ceding Chickasaw land in exchange for financial compensation.

In the early 1800s, Constantine Shannon brought strawberry plants from Shannon to Plant City, Florida, enabling the creation of a multimillion-dollar industry in Plant City.

A church was established in 1839.

The original townsite was north of the present location, and was moved when the Mobile and Ohio Railroad was constructed through the community in 1860. A post office was opened November 6, 1860, and the town was incorporated July 20, 1870.

Shannon was originally part of Itawamba County, but became part of Lee county after that county formed in 1866.

Commerce expanded in Shannon, and there was a corn elevator, grain elevator, and three cotton gins. Around 1915, Coca-Cola was bottled in Shannon.

The old Francis Store, one of the town's original buildings, is now a restaurant owned by the Town of Shannon.

=== 1963 Tornado ===
On April 29, 1963 A powerful and devastating F4 Tornado struck the center Destroying 27 structures killing 3 and injuring 20 more. It is reported that asphalt from highway 45 was ripped off from the ground

=== 2025 Tornado ===
At 10:10 CST on February 10, 2025, a relatively small EF-1 tornado struck south of the city. No injuries were reported.

=== Gay bar controversy ===
From 1998 until 2007, Shannon was home to Rumors, a gay bar featured in the Kevin Smith/Malcolm Ingram film Small Town Gay Bar. In 2013, after a hiatus, local businesspeople tried to reopen the bar. The town refused. This refusal led to a lawsuit claiming the town had refused the application out of concern of having a gay bar in its jurisdiction.

A message on the town's website reads: "we take pride in being on the quiet side of county with our relaxed country living where traditions of family, faith, and brotherly love make up who we are today."

== Geography ==
Shannon is located at 34°7′1″N 88°42′5″W (34.116826, -88.701520).

According to the United States Census Bureau, the town has a total area of 4.1 square miles (11 km^{2}), all land.

== Demographics ==
Historical population
Census	Pop.	Note	%±
1880	232		—
1890	329		41.8%
1900	434		31.9%
1910	564		30.0%
1920	498		−11.7%
1930	524		5.2%
1940	615		17.4%
1950	520		−15.4%
1960	554		6.5%
1970	575		3.8%
1980	680		18.3%
1990	1,419		108.7%
2000	1,657		16.8%
2010	1,753		5.8%
2020	1,496		−14.7%
U.S. Decennial Census

=== Racial and ethnic composition ===
Shannon town, Mississippi – Racial and ethnic composition Note: the US Census treats Hispanic/Latino as an ethnic category. This table excludes Latinos from the racial categories and assigns them to a separate category. Hispanics/Latinos may be of any race.
Race / Ethnicity (NH = Non-Hispanic)	Pop 2000	Pop 2010	Pop 2020	% 2000	% 2010	% 2020
White alone (NH)	731	740	488	44.12%	42.21%	32.62%
Black or African American alone (NH)	893	943	919	53.89%	53.79%	61.43%
Native American or Alaska Native alone (NH)	1	0	0	0.06%	0.00%	0.00%
Asian alone (NH)	2	5	4	0.12%	0.29%	0.27%
Native Hawaiian or Pacific Islander alone (NH)	0	0	2	0.00%	0.00%	0.13%
Other race alone (NH)	0	0	1	0.00%	0.00%	0.07%
Mixed race or Multiracial (NH)	4	27	58	0.24%	1.54%	3.88%
Hispanic or Latino (any race)	26	38	24	1.57%	2.17%	1.60%
Total	1,657	1,753	1,496	100.00%	100.00%	100.00%

=== 2020 census ===
As of the 2020 United States census, there were 1,496 people, 700 households, and 416 families residing in the town.

=== 2000 census ===
As of the census of 2000, there were 1,657 people, 632 households, and 437 families residing in the town. The population density was 403.5 inhabitants per square mile (155.8/km^{2}). There were 691 housing units at an average density of 168.3 per square mile (65.0/km^{2}). The racial makeup of the town was 44.42% White, 54.19% African American, 0.06% Native American, 0.12% Asian, 0.84% from other races, and 0.36% from two or more races. Hispanic or Latino of any race were 1.57% of the population.

There were 632 households, out of which 40.2% had children under the age of 18 living with them, 38.4% were married couples living together, 23.7% had a female householder with no husband present, and 30.7% were non-families. 27.1% of all households were made up of individuals, and 7.9% had someone living alone who was 65 years of age or older. The average household size was 2.62 and the average family size was 3.18.

In the town, the population was spread out, with 32.0% under the age of 18, 10.6% from 18 to 24, 29.5% from 25 to 44, 19.1% from 45 to 64, and 8.8% who were 65 years of age or older. The median age was 29 years. For every 100 females, there were 94.9 males. For every 100 females age 18 and over, there were 91.3 males.

The median income for a household in the town was $29,773, and the median income for a family was $30,848. Males had a median income of $25,313 versus $20,149 for females. The per capita income for the town was $13,592. About 16.3% of families and 18.4% of the population were below the poverty line, including 21.6% of those under age 18 and 21.4% of those age 65 or over.

== Economy ==
In 2005, General Atomics opened a $38 million manufacturing and test facility in Shannon. Much of the work at the facility is for the U.S. Navy, including advanced launch and recovery systems for aircraft carriers.

== Education ==
The Town of Shannon is served by the Lee County School District.

== Notable people ==
- Cousins Bertha Barbee and Norma Barbee of The Velvelettes were born in Shannon.
- David Beckley, president of Rust College and Wiley College
- Guy Bush, professional baseball player; retired to Shannon.
- George Washington Forbes, co-founder of the Boston Guardian.
- Romaro Miller, former National Football League quarterback
- Rickey W. Thompson, member of the Mississippi House of Representatives
