= Prairie, Mississippi =

- Unincorporated community
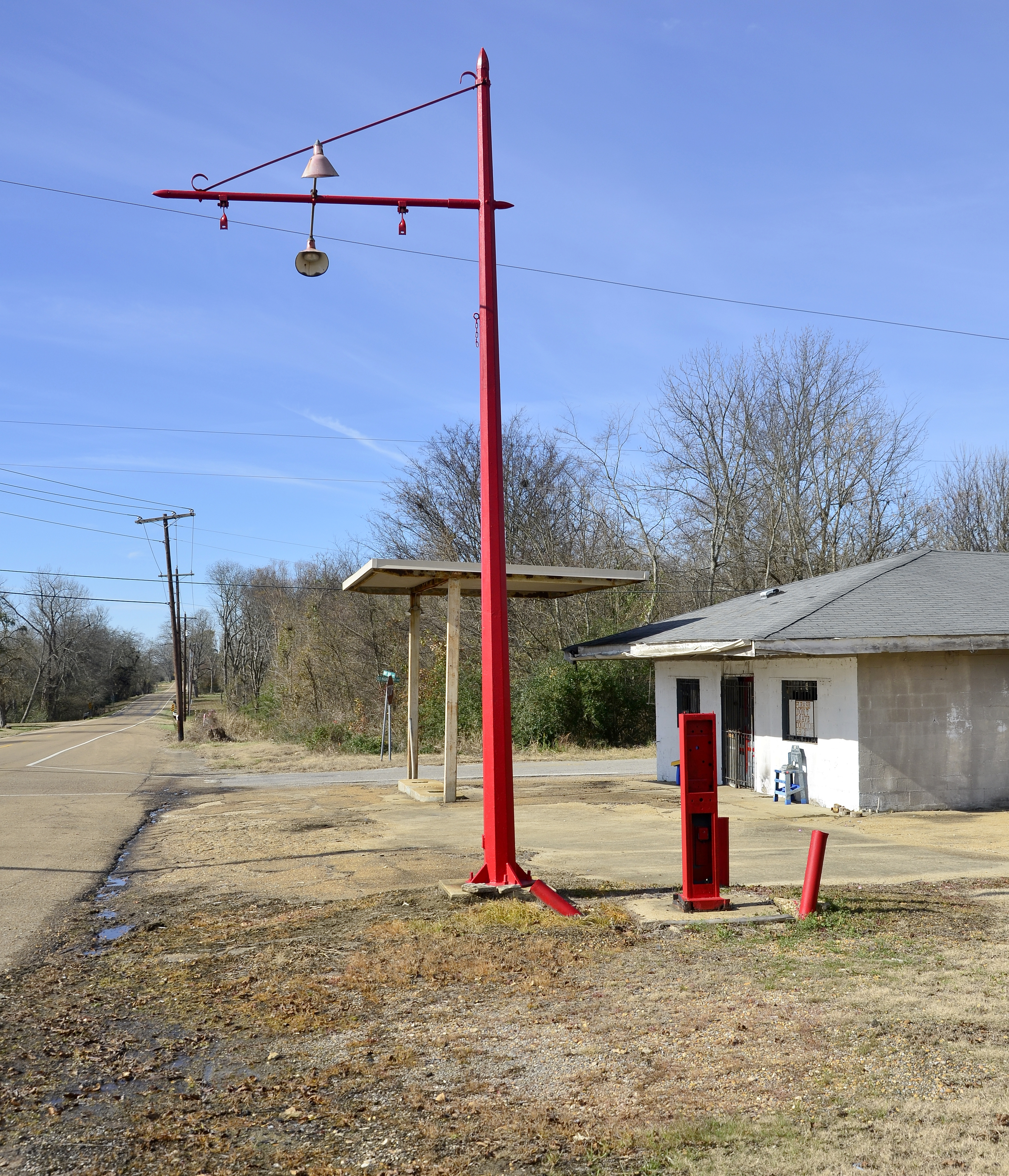
- Abandoned gas station in Prairie

- Location within Mississippi Location within the United States
- Coordinates: 33°47′48″N 88°40′03″W
- Country: United States
- State: Mississippi
- County: Monroe
- Elevation: 295 ft (90 m)
- Time zone: UTC-6 (Central (CST))
  - Summer (DST): UTC-5 (CDT)
- ZIP code: 39756
- Area code: 662
- GNIS feature ID: 676296

Prairie, (formerly known as Prairie Station), is an unincorporated community in Monroe County, Mississippi, United States.

Prairie is located west of Aberdeen on Mississippi Highway 382.

== History ==
In January, 1860, the Mobile and Ohio Railroad built a line and train station at Prairie.

A post office operated under the name Prairie Station from January 23, 1860 to August 22, 1895 when the name was changed to Prairie in 1895.

Prairie is located along the CPKC Railway ex Kansas City Southern Railway and was incorporated in 1908. It was disincorporated at an unknown date.

In 1900, Prairie had a population of 122.

Prairie is served by the Prairie Community Center.

The Lenoir Plantation is located outside of Prairie and is listed on the National Register of Historic Places. It is the only surviving example of a Classical Revival home in Mississippi. The home was the site of a skirmish between Union Army soldiers under the command of George E. Waring Jr. and Confederate forces during the American Civil War.

=== Gulf Ordnance Plant ===
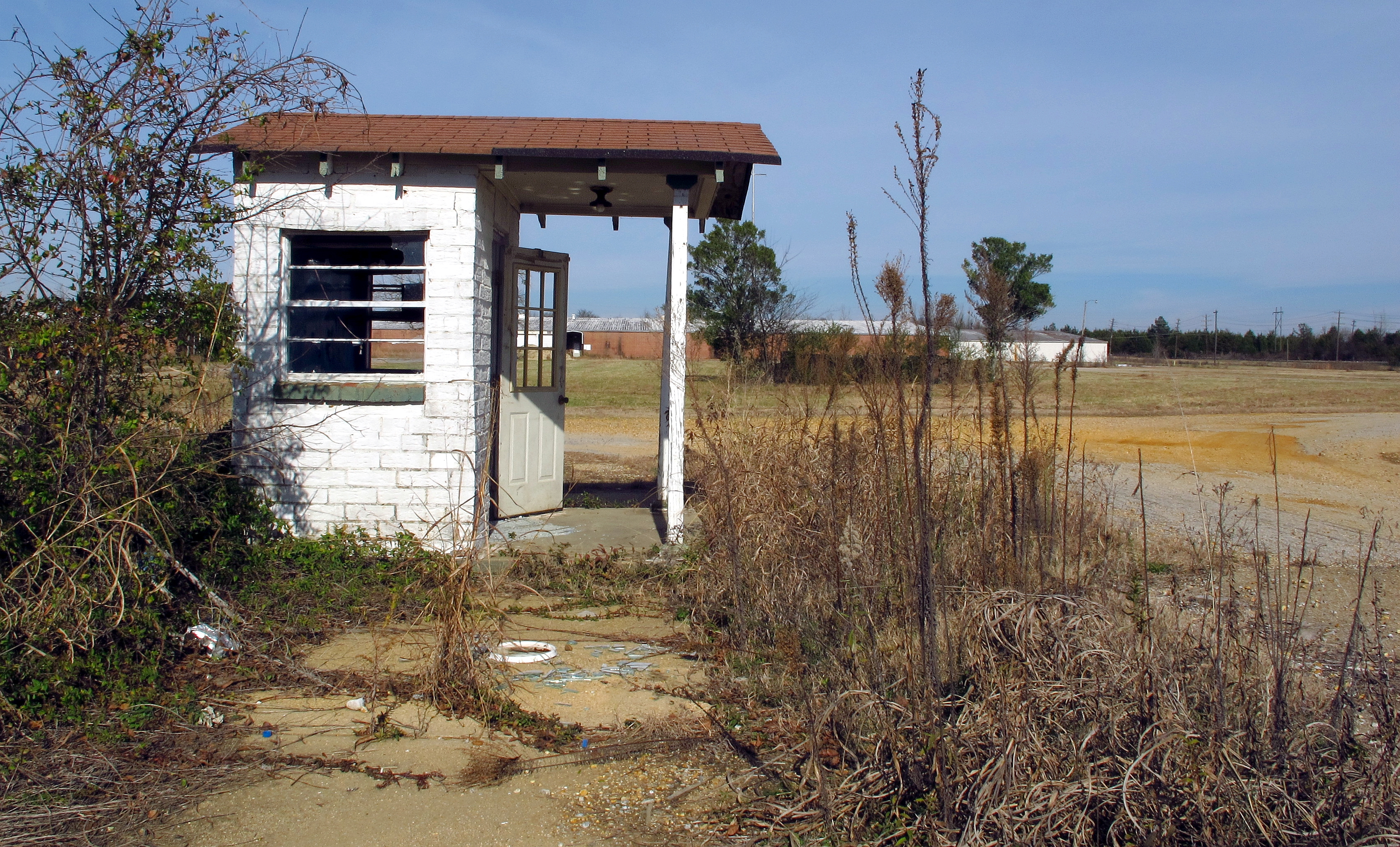
Former main gate to Gulf Ordnance Plant

From 1942 to 1945, Prairie was the site of the Gulf Ordnance Plant, one of the largest ammunition manufacturing plants of World War II. The plant was managed by Procter and Gamble. Up to 10,000 workers—mostly women—were employed at the plant, which manufactured 20, 40, 57, and 67 millimeter shells, rocket launchers, 100-pound bombs and naval tracer ammunition.

During World War II, the ordnance plant was the second-largest employer in the state, behind the Ingalls Shipyard.

The plant was abandoned following the war. Mississippi State University runs an experimental cattle ranch on part of the former plant, while the rest lies in ruins.

== Notable people ==
- Ezekiel C. Gathings, member of the United States House of Representatives from 1939 to 1969
- James Gilreath, pop singer
- William G. Roberds, justice on the Supreme Court of Mississippi from 1940 to 1960
