= Mayhew, Mississippi =

Unincorporated community in Mississippi, United States

- Unincorporated community
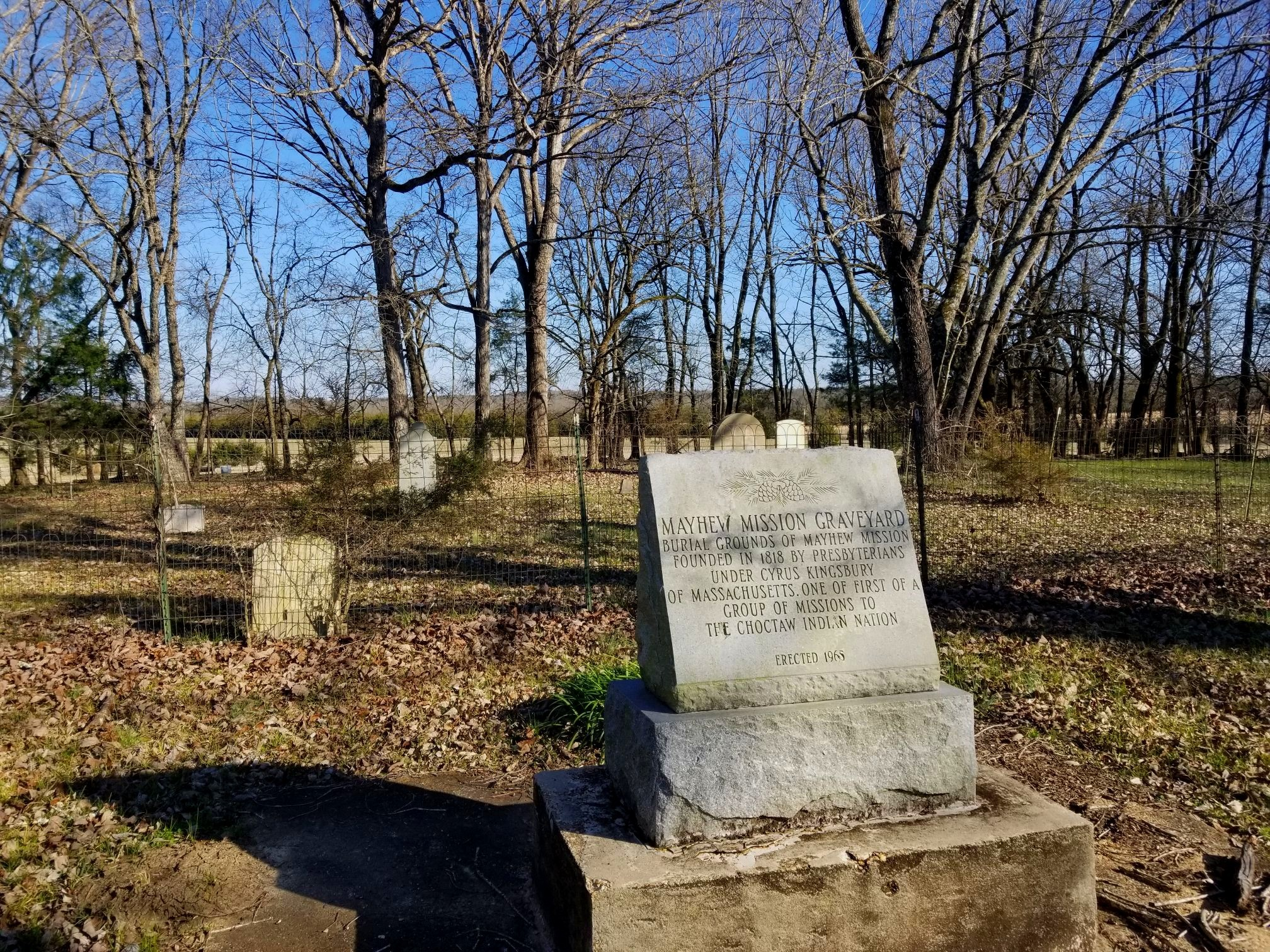
- The cemetery at the old Mayhew Mission site

- Location within the state of Mississippi Mayhew (the United States)
- Coordinates: 33°29′05″N 88°38′04″W
- Country: United States
- State: Mississippi
- County: Lowndes
- Elevation: 207 ft (63 m)
- Time zone: UTC-6 (Central (CST))
  - Summer (DST): UTC-5 (CDT)
- Area code: 662
- GNIS feature ID: 673265

Mayhew is an unincorporated community in Lowndes County, Mississippi.

Mayhew is located west of Columbus, north of Artesia, east of Starkville and south of West Point. According to the United States Geological Survey, a variant name is Mayhew Station.

== History ==
In 1818, Mayhew Mission was established at Mayhew by Presbyterians from Massachusetts under Cyrus Kingsbury for the purpose of Christianizing and educating the Choctaw Indians. The community was named Mayhew in honor of another missionary family from Massachusetts. The population of Mayhew Mission quickly declined after the Treaty of Dancing Rabbit Creek was signed and the Choctaw people were forced to relocate on the Trail of Tears.

Mayhew Station was the original name given to the community when it was moved from its original site (near Muldrow, Mississippi) to alongside the tracks of the newly built Mobile and Ohio Railroad (later Gulf, Mobile & Ohio Railroad) around 1858. The original location of the town of Mayhew is now referred to as Old Mayhew, but only a cemetery exists there today. In 1900, the population of Mayhew was 139. Bees, lumber, and hay were shipped from Mayhew and the community also had a tannery.

Mayhew is also referred to as Mayhew Junction, or more commonly as "The Crossroads" by area residents, a reference to when U.S. Route 82 and U.S. Route 45 crossed as at-grade two-lane highways. Before the construction of the new U.S. Route 82 and the expansion of U.S. Route 45 to four lanes, the intersection of the original highways was a four way stop. Several bars and service stations, catering to students from the nearby Mississippi State University, lined the four sides of the original intersection and were torn down when the new expressways were built over a period of several years between 1975 and 1995.

The East Mississippi Community College Golden Triangle Campus is in Mayhew.

A post office operated under the name Mayhew from 1833 to 1837, under the name Mayhews Station from 1856 to 1903, and again under the name Mayhew beginning in 1903.

In 1960, seven black men from Little Rock, Arkansas used a restroom at Weaver's Amoco in Osborn, where there was only one restroom, which was for whites only. They were arrested in Mayhew and required to pay a $200 per person bond. According to the law, they faced a maximum penalty of six months in jail and fines of $500 each. The case was widely anticipated as the first test of the state's sit-in law, but was settled when the defendants unexpectedly pleaded guilty and paid a small fine in Starkville the next day.

Mayhew was once home to Stover Apiaries, the world's largest queen bee apiary, which shipped queen bees to beekeepers worldwide.

== Education ==
East Mississippi Community College is the designated community college for Lowndes County. The Golden Triangle Campus, in Mayhew, began operations in 1968.

The K-12 school district covering Mayhew is the Lowndes County School District.

== Notable people ==
- Beaumont B. Buck, Major General in the United States Army officer who served in the Spanish–American War, the Philippine–American War, and World War I. Commanded a regiment, brigade and division of the 1st Division during World War I.
- Horatio B. Cushman, historian, author of History of the Choctaw, Chickasaw, and Natchez Indians
- Moon Mullens, jazz trumpeter
