= Kolola Springs, Mississippi =

Unincorporated community in Mississippi, United States

- Unincorporated community
- Location within the state of Mississippi Kolola Springs (the United States)
- Coordinates: 33°39′14″N 88°24′32″W
- Country: United States
- State: Mississippi
- County: Lowndes
- Elevation: 223 ft (68 m)
- Time zone: UTC-6 (Central (CST))
  - Summer (DST): UTC-5 (CDT)
- Area code: 662
- GNIS feature ID: 672212

Kolola Springs is an unincorporated community in Lowndes County, Mississippi, United States.

Kolola Springs is located on U.S. Route 45, north of Columbus and west of Caledonia. According to the United States Geological Survey, a variant name is Shinns Spring.

Kolola Springs may be derived from a Chickasaw name meaning "singing springs". The springs were purported to have medicinal qualities and contain sodium, calcium, and large parts of iron.

The community is also located on the BNSF Railway.

A post office operated under the name Kolola Springs from 1928 to 1953.

Kolola Springs was once home to the Jones Motel, which was located along U.S. Route 45.
