= Flint Hill, Mississippi =

Unincorporated community in Mississippi, United States

- Unincorporated community
- Location within the state of Mississippi Flint Hill (the United States)
- Coordinates: 33°42′58″N 88°16′32″W
- Country: United States
- State: Mississippi
- County: Lowndes
- Elevation: 423 ft (129 m)
- Time zone: UTC-6 (Central (CST))
  - Summer (DST): UTC-5 (CDT)
- Area code: 662
- GNIS feature ID: 687814

Flint Hill is an unincorporated community in Lowndes County, Mississippi.

Flint Hill is located northeast of Caledonia.
