= Muldon, Mississippi =

- Unincorporated community
- Location within Mississippi Location within the United States
- Coordinates: 33°43′56″N 88°39′14″W
- Country: United States
- State: Mississippi
- County: Monroe
- Elevation: 295 ft (90 m)
- Time zone: UTC-6 (Central (CST))
  - Summer (DST): UTC-5 (CDT)
- Area code: 662
- GNIS feature ID: 674461

Muldon, also known as Aberdeen Junction, Loohattan, Loohatten and Louhatten, is an unincorporated community in Monroe County, Mississippi. Muldon is located southwest of Aberdeen on Mississippi Highway 25.

== History ==
The Mobile and Ohio Railroad built a line through Muldon around January 1860.

A post office operated under the name Aberdeen Junction in 1870 and under the name Muldon from 1870 to 1957.

In 1900, Muldon had a church, a population of 75, and was considered an important cotton shipping point.

Muldon is located along the CPKC Railway, ex Kansas City Southern Railway.

The Muldon Field is a natural gas producing formation near Muldon.
