= Woodlawn, Mississippi =

Unincorporated community in Mississippi, United States

- Unincorporated community
- Location within the state of Mississippi Woodlawn (the United States)
- Coordinates: 33°37′22″N 88°18′47″W
- Country: United States
- State: Mississippi
- County: Lowndes
- Elevation: 289 ft (88 m)
- Time zone: UTC-6 (Central (CST))
  - Summer (DST): UTC-5 (CDT)
- Area code: 662
- GNIS feature ID: 710103

Woodlawn is an unincorporated community in Lowndes County, Mississippi. Woodlawn is located northeast of Columbus on Mississippi Highway 12. According to the United States Geological Survey, a variant name is Woods Lawn.

The Woodlawn Cumberland Presbyterian Church was founded in the community in 1869.
