= Trinity, Mississippi =

Unincorporated community in Mississippi, United States

- Unincorporated community
- Location within the state of Mississippi Trinity (the United States)
- Coordinates: 33°20′45″N 88°27′44″W
- Country: United States
- State: Mississippi
- County: Lowndes
- Elevation: 226 ft (69 m)
- Time zone: UTC-6 (Central (CST))
  - Summer (DST): UTC-5 (CDT)
- Area code: 662
- GNIS feature ID: 678878

Trinity is an unincorporated community in Lowndes County, Mississippi. Trinity is located south of Columbus. According to the United States Geological Survey, a variant name is Bryans Store.

A post office operated under the name Trinity from 1879 to 1903. J. M. Bryan served as the community's first postmaster. Bryan also operated a store in the community.
