= Penns, Mississippi =

Unincorporated community in Mississippi, United States

- Unincorporated community
- Location within the state of Mississippi Penns (the United States)
- Coordinates: 33°21′08″N 88°38′09″W
- Country: United States
- State: Mississippi
- County: Lowndes
- Elevation: 292 ft (89 m)
- Time zone: UTC-6 (Central (CST))
  - Summer (DST): UTC-5 (CDT)
- Area code: 662
- GNIS feature ID: 675594

Penns, also known as Penn or Penns Station, is an unincorporated community in Lowndes County, Mississippi. Penns is located south of Artesia on U.S. Route 45.

Penns is located on the Kansas City Southern Railway. In 1900, the community had a population of 100. In 1918, the Mobile and Ohio Railroad closed their station in Penns.

A post office operated under the name Penns from 1888 to 1920.

The Penn Company operated an apiary in Penns and shipped queen bees throughout the United States. Hay and lumber were also shipped from Penns.
