= Whitebury, Mississippi =

Unincorporated community in Mississippi, United States

- Unincorporated community
- Location within the state of Mississippi Whitebury (the United States)
- Coordinates: 33°25′46″N 88°22′35″W
- Country: United States
- State: Mississippi
- County: Lowndes
- Elevation: 184 ft (56 m)
- Time zone: UTC-6 (Central (CST))
  - Summer (DST): UTC-5 (CDT)
- Area code: 662
- GNIS feature ID: 679618

Whitebury is an unincorporated community in Lowndes County, Mississippi. Whitebury is located southeast of Columbus. Whitebury is located on the BNSF Railway.
