= Wells, Mississippi =

Unincorporated community in Mississippi, United States

- Unincorporated community
- Location within the state of Mississippi Wells (the United States)
- Coordinates: 33°35′52″N 88°23′40″W
- Country: United States
- State: Mississippi
- County: Lowndes
- Elevation: 200 ft (61 m)
- Time zone: UTC-6 (Central (CST))
  - Summer (DST): UTC-5 (CDT)
- Area code: 662
- GNIS feature ID: 679437

Wells is an unincorporated community in Lowndes County, Mississippi. Wells is located north of Columbus. According to the United States Geological Survey, a variant name is Marx.
