= Chiwapa Creek =

Stream in Mississippi, U.S.

Coordinates: 34.0728874°N 88.6486603°W

Chiwapa Creek is a stream in the U.S. state of Mississippi. It is a tributary to Town Creek.

Chiwapa Creek is a name derived from either the Choctaw language or Chickasaw language but scholars do not agree on its meaning. Variant names are "Chawappa Creek", "Chiwappa Creek", "Chowapa Creek", "Chowappa Creek", "Chowwappa Creek", and "Pontotoc Creek".

The Chiwapa Creek watershed has been impounded by ten different dams to ensure flood control. Many of these dams were funded in part by the Watershed Protection and Flood Prevention Act of 1954.
