= Plum Grove, Mississippi =

Unincorporated community in Mississippi, United States

- Unincorporated community
- Location within the state of Mississippi Plum Grove (the United States)
- Coordinates: 33°18′35″N 88°26′25″W
- Country: United States
- State: Mississippi
- County: Lowndes
- Elevation: 217 ft (66 m)
- Time zone: UTC-6 (Central (CST))
  - Summer (DST): UTC-5 (CDT)
- Area code: 662
- GNIS feature ID: 690854

Plum Grove is an unincorporated community in Lowndes County, Mississippi. Plum Grove is located south of Columbus.

Plum Grove is served by a community center.

Plum Grove was once home to an elementary school and 4-H club.

Sylvester Harris, a citizen of Plum Grove, received national attention when he called President Franklin D. Roosevelt at the White House and successfully implored him to prevent Harris' farm from being foreclosed.

== Notable person ==
- Sam Hairston, Major League Baseball catcher
