= Forreston, Mississippi =

Unincorporated community in Mississippi, United States

- Unincorporated community
- Location within the state of Mississippi Forreston (the United States)
- Coordinates: 33°20′14″N 88°18′49″W
- Country: United States
- State: Mississippi
- County: Lowndes
- Elevation: 151 ft (46 m)
- Time zone: UTC-6 (Central (CST))
  - Summer (DST): UTC-5 (CDT)
- Area code: 662
- GNIS feature ID: 670107

Forreston is an unincorporated community in Lowndes County, Mississippi.

Forreston is located southeast of Columbus near the Alabama state line. Forreston is located on the BNSF Railway. The community was likely named after a local plantation.
