= Lowndes County, Mississippi =

County in Mississippi, United States

- County
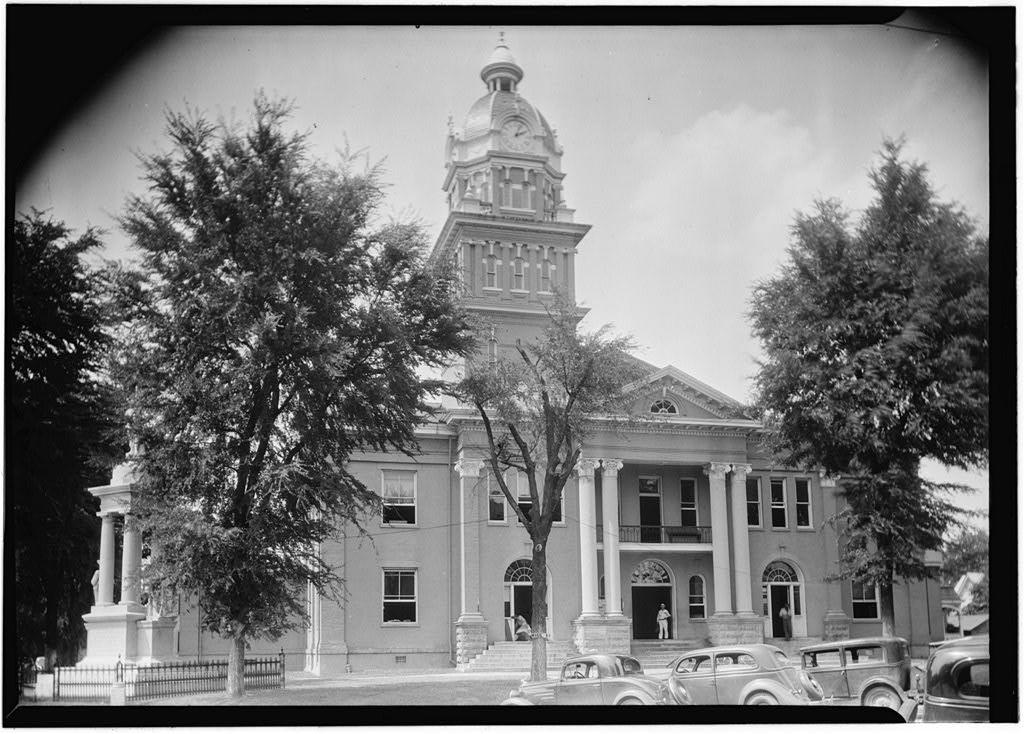
- Lowndes County Courthouse in Columbus

- Location within the U.S. state of Mississippi
- Coordinates: 33°28′N 88°26′W
- Country: United States
- State: Mississippi
- Founded: 1830
- Named for: William Jones Lowndes
- Seat: Columbus
- Largest city: Columbus

Area
  - Total: 516 sq mi (1,340 km^{2})
  - Land: 506 sq mi (1,310 km^{2})
  - Water: 11 sq mi (28 km^{2}) 2.1%

Population (2020)
  - Total: 58,879
  - Estimate (2025): 57,346 ▼
  - Density: 116/sq mi (44.9/km^{2})
- Time zone: UTC−6 (Central)
  - Summer (DST): UTC−5 (CDT)
- Congressional district: 1st
- Website: lowndescountyms.com

Lowndes County is a county on the eastern border of the U.S. state of Mississippi. As of the 2020 United States census, the population was 58,879. Its county seat is Columbus. The county is named for U.S. Congressman William Jones Lowndes.

Lowndes County comprises the Columbus, MS Micropolitan Statistical Area. Since the late 20th century, it has been designated as one of three counties in the Golden Triangle region of the state.

== History ==
This upland area was settled by European Americans who wanted to develop cotton plantations to produce what became the largest commodity crop in the state.

In the period from 1877 to 1950, Lowndes County had 19 documented lynchings of African Americans, third to Carroll and Leflore counties, which had 29 and 48, respectively. This form of racial terrorism was at its height in the decades around the turn of the 20th century, which followed the state's disenfranchisement of most blacks in 1890 through creating barriers to voter registration.

== Geography ==
Lowndes County lies on the east side of Mississippi, bordering the U.S. state of Alabama. Its terrain was completely wooded before settlement; at present its more level areas have been cleared and turned to agricultural or urban use, with the drainages (about 40% of the total area) still wooded. The Tennessee−Tombigbee Waterway flows south-southeastward through the center of the county, with a significant lock system (John C. Stennis Lock and Dam) near Columbus. The county's highest point (450 feet/140 meters ASL) is a small rise near the county's NE corner.

According to the United States Census Bureau, the county has a total area of 516 square miles (1,340 km^{2}), of which 506 square miles (1,310 km^{2}) is land and 11 square miles (28 km^{2}) (2.1%) is water.

=== Major highways ===
- U.S. Highway 45
- U.S. Route 45 Alternate
- U.S. Highway 82
- Mississippi Highway 12
- Mississippi Highway 50
- Mississippi Highway 69
- Mississippi Highway 182

=== Adjacent counties ===
- Noxubee County - south
- Oktibbeha County - west
- Clay County - northwest
- Monroe County - north
- Lamar County, Alabama - northeast
- Pickens County, Alabama - southeast

== Demographics ==
Historical population
Census	Pop.	Note	%±
1830	3,173		—
1840	14,513		357.4%
1850	19,544		34.7%
1860	23,625		20.9%
1870	30,502		29.1%
1880	28,244		−7.4%
1890	27,047		−4.2%
1900	29,095		7.6%
1910	30,703		5.5%
1920	27,632		−10.0%
1930	29,987		8.5%
1940	35,245		17.5%
1950	37,852		7.4%
1960	46,639		23.2%
1970	49,700		6.6%
1980	57,304		15.3%
1990	59,308		3.5%
2000	61,586		3.8%
2010	59,779		−2.9%
2020	58,879		−1.5%
2025 (est.)	57,346	▼	−2.6%
US Decennial Census; 1790-1960 1900-1990; 1990-2000 2010-2013

=== Racial and ethnic composition ===
Lowndes County, Mississippi – Racial and ethnic composition Note: the US Census treats Hispanic/Latino as an ethnic category. This table excludes Latinos from the racial categories and assigns them to a separate category. Hispanics/Latinos may be of any race.
Race / Ethnicity (NH = Non-Hispanic)	Pop 1980	Pop 1990	Pop 2000	Pop 2010	Pop 2020	% 1980	% 1990	% 2000	% 2010	% 2020
White alone (NH)	36,910	36,442	34,489	31,847	29,363	64.41%	61.45%	56.00%	53.27%	49.87%
Black or African American alone (NH)	19,425	21,990	25,486	25,904	25,885	33.90%	37.08%	41.38%	43.33%	43.96%
Native American or Alaska Native alone (NH)	71	75	99	98	110	0.12%	0.13%	0.16%	0.16%	0.19%
Asian alone (NH)	259	289	329	394	514	0.45%	0.49%	0.53%	0.66%	0.87%
Native Hawaiian or Pacific Islander alone (NH)	x	x	8	31	16	x	x	0.01%	0.05%	0.03%
Other race alone (NH)	118	21	29	34	110	0.21%	0.04%	0.05%	0.06%	0.19%
Mixed race or Multiracial (NH)	x	x	462	557	1,558	x	x	0.75%	0.93%	2.65%
Hispanic or Latino (any race)	521	491	684	914	1,323	0.91%	0.83%	1.11%	1.53%	2.25%
Total	57,304	59,308	61,586	59,779	58,879	100.00%	100.00%	100.00%	100.00%	100.00%

=== 2020 census ===
As of the 2020 census, the county had a population of 58,879. The median age was 38.3 years. 22.5% of residents were under the age of 18 and 17.4% of residents were 65 years of age or older. For every 100 females there were 91.3 males, and for every 100 females age 18 and over there were 88.0 males age 18 and over.

The racial makeup of the county was 50.6% White, 44.2% Black or African American, 0.2% American Indian and Alaska Native, 0.9% Asian, <0.1% Native Hawaiian and Pacific Islander, 0.9% from some other race, and 3.3% from two or more races. Hispanic or Latino residents of any race comprised 2.2% of the population.

45.7% of residents lived in urban areas, while 54.3% lived in rural areas.

There were 23,680 households in the county, of which 30.3% had children under the age of 18 living in them. Of all households, 40.2% were married-couple households, 20.1% were households with a male householder and no spouse or partner present, and 34.8% were households with a female householder and no spouse or partner present. About 31.1% of all households were made up of individuals and 12.6% had someone living alone who was 65 years of age or older.

There were 26,882 housing units, of which 11.9% were vacant. Among occupied housing units, 62.2% were owner-occupied and 37.8% were renter-occupied. The homeowner vacancy rate was 1.8% and the rental vacancy rate was 13.2%.

=== 2010 census ===
As of the 2010 United States census, there were 59,779 people in the county. 54.0% were White, 43.5% Black or African American, 0.7% Asian, 0.2% Native American, 0.1% Pacific Islander, 0.6% of some other race and 1.1% of two or more races. 1.5% were Hispanic or Latino (of any race).

=== 2000 census ===
As of the 2000 United States census, there were 61,586 people, 22,849 households, and 16,405 families in the county. The population density was 123 people per square mile (47 people/km^{2}). There were 25,104 housing units at an average density of 50 units per square mile (19 units/km^{2}). The racial makeup of the county was 56.47% White, 41.56% Black or African American, 0.17% Native American, 0.54% Asian, 0.03% Pacific Islander, 0.39% from other races, and 0.85% from two or more races. 1.11% of the population were Hispanic or Latino of any race.

There were 22,849 households, out of which 36.50% had children under the age of 18 living with them, 49.20% were married couples living together, 18.70% had a female householder with no husband present, and 28.20% were non-families. 24.60% of all households were made up of individuals, and 8.90% had someone living alone who was 65 years of age or older. The average household size was 2.61 and the average family size was 3.13.

The county population contained 28.60% under the age of 18, 10.60% from 18 to 24, 29.20% from 25 to 44, 20.40% from 45 to 64, and 11.20% who were 65 years of age or older. The median age was 33 years. For every 100 females there were 89.90 males. For every 100 females age 18 and over, there were 84.20 males age 18 and over.

The median income for a household in the county was $32,123, and the median income for a family was $38,248. Males had a median income of $31,792 versus $20,640 for females. The per capita income for the county was $16,514. About 18.00% of families and 21.30% of the population were below the poverty line, including 31.80% of those under age 18 and 16.80% of those age 65 or over.

== Education ==
=== Primary and secondary schools ===
Portions of Lowndes County are served by the Columbus Municipal School District and the Lowndes County School District.

Private schools are under the Mississippi Association of Independent Schools – Lowndes County Division.

The Columbus Municipal School District includes:

- Columbus High School
- Columbus Middle School
- McKellar Technology Center
- Joe Cook Elementary Fine Arts Magnet School
- Fairview Elementary Aerospace and Science Magnet School
- Franklin Academy Elementary Medical Sciences and Wellness Magnet School
- Sale Elementary International Studies Magnet School
- Stokes-Beard Elementary Communication and Technology Magnet School
- Columbus Alternative School

The Lowndes County School District has three areas, each with an elementary school, a middle school, and a high school

- Caledonia Schools
- New Hope Schools
- West Lowndes Schools

The Mississippi Association of Independent Schools – Lowndes County Division has provided five private and parochial schools for Lowndes County

- Heritage Academy High School
- Heritage Academy Elementary School
- Columbus Christian Academy
- Victory Christian Academy
- Annunciation Catholic School

On-post families at Columbus Air Force Base may choose between

=== Colleges and universities ===
Mississippi University for Women is located in Columbus. Lowndes County is within the service area of the East Mississippi Community College system. The Golden Triangle Campus is located in Mayhew, an unincorporated area in Lowndes County. The system also offers classes at the Columbus Air Force Base Extension in Columbus.

== Communities ==
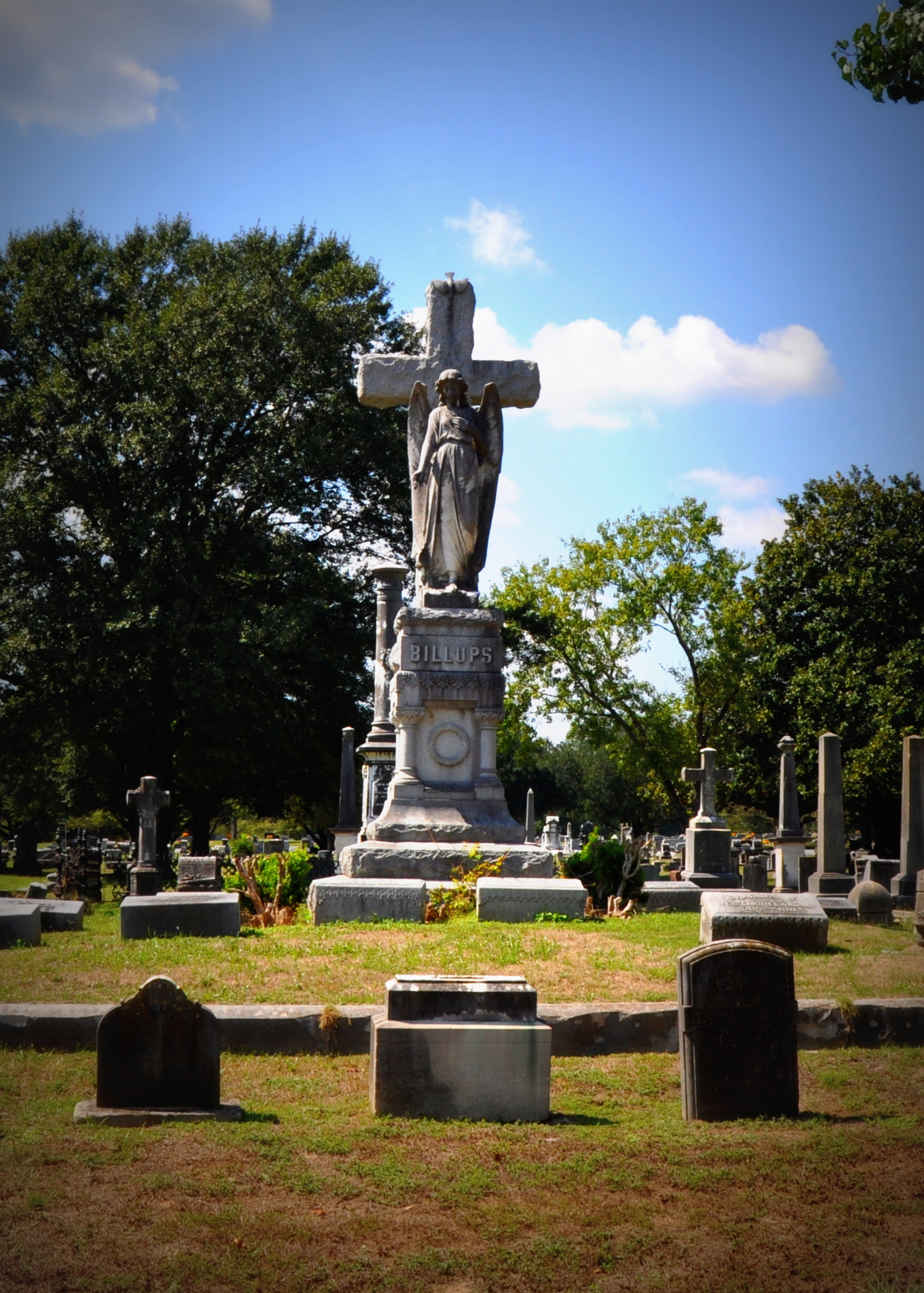
Friendship Cemetery

=== City ===
- Columbus (county seat)

=== Town ===
- Artesia
- Caledonia
- Crawford ("Crawfordsville" 1852–1870; "Crawfordville 1870–1879)

=== Census-designated places ===
- Columbus Air Force Base
- New Hope

=== Unincorporated communities ===
- Bent Oak
- Billups
- Flint Hill
- Forreston
- Kolola Springs
- Mayhew
- McCrary
- Penns
- Plum Grove
- Steens
- Trinity
- Wells
- Whitebury
- Woodlawn

=== Ghost towns ===
- Moores Bluff
- Nashville
- Plymouth

== Politics ==
Lowndes County leans Republican, having not supported a Democrat since 1956. However, in 2008 Democrat Barack Obama came the closest to winning the county since Adlai Stevenson had won it in 1956, and in 2012 Obama came even closer, only losing it by 130 votes. While the margin has widened again in subsequent elections, Republican candidates have been unable to regain double digit victories in the county.

United States presidential election results for Lowndes County, Mississippi
Year	Republican		Democratic		Third party(ies)	
Year	No.	%	No.	%	No.	%
1912	12	1.32%	872	95.82%	26	2.86%
1916	29	2.72%	1,028	96.53%	8	0.75%
1920	51	5.16%	928	93.93%	9	0.91%
1924	62	3.61%	1,655	96.39%	0	0.00%
1928	185	7.97%	2,136	92.03%	0	0.00%
1932	50	2.12%	2,305	97.50%	9	0.38%
1936	56	2.34%	2,328	97.24%	10	0.42%
1940	147	6.08%	2,268	93.80%	3	0.12%
1944	360	13.98%	2,216	86.02%	0	0.00%
1948	66	2.25%	116	3.95%	2,755	93.80%
1952	2,670	62.27%	1,618	37.73%	0	0.00%
1956	1,205	29.21%	2,308	55.94%	613	14.86%
1960	2,010	42.95%	1,240	26.50%	1,430	30.56%
1964	6,135	92.01%	533	7.99%	0	0.00%
1968	1,968	17.85%	2,229	20.22%	6,829	61.94%
1972	10,098	78.70%	2,398	18.69%	335	2.61%
1976	8,003	54.44%	6,181	42.05%	516	3.51%
1980	9,973	60.98%	6,187	37.83%	195	1.19%
1984	12,049	66.29%	6,078	33.44%	50	0.28%
1988	11,258	64.96%	5,993	34.58%	80	0.46%
1992	10,509	55.80%	6,552	34.79%	1,774	9.42%
1996	9,169	56.40%	6,220	38.26%	869	5.35%
2000	11,404	59.30%	7,537	39.19%	289	1.50%
2004	13,690	56.41%	10,408	42.89%	170	0.70%
2008	13,994	50.95%	13,209	48.09%	262	0.95%
2012	13,518	49.78%	13,388	49.30%	252	0.93%
2016	13,271	51.89%	11,819	46.21%	485	1.90%
2020	13,800	50.66%	13,087	48.04%	354	1.30%
2024	13,087	53.58%	11,096	45.43%	243	0.99%

== See also ==
- National Register of Historic Places listings in Lowndes County, Mississippi
