= Crawford, Mississippi =

- Town
- Location of Crawford, Mississippi

- Location in the United States
- Coordinates: 33°18′22″N 88°37′19″W
- Country: United States
- State: Mississippi
- County: Lowndes

Area
  - Total: 1.40 sq mi (3.63 km^{2})
  - Land: 1.40 sq mi (3.63 km^{2})
  - Water: 0 sq mi (0.00 km^{2})
- Elevation: 312 ft (95 m)

Population (2020)
  - Total: 415
  - Density: 296.4/sq mi (114.44/km^{2})
- Time zone: UTC-6 (Central (CST))
  - Summer (DST): UTC-5 (CDT)
- ZIP code: 39743
- Area code: 662
- FIPS code: 28-16420
- GNIS feature ID: 0668933

Crawford is a small town in Lowndes County, Mississippi, United States. As of the 2020 census, Crawford had a population of 415.

== History ==
During the 1840s, a Baptist minister named Peter Crawford lived in the area. When the town was platted in 1852, it was named Crawfordsville. This name was used until 1870, when it was shortened to Crawfordville. Finally in 1879 it was changed to Crawford.

The Mobile and Ohio Railroad came though Crawfordsville in 1857. A station was listed at Crawford as early as 1874.

== Geography ==
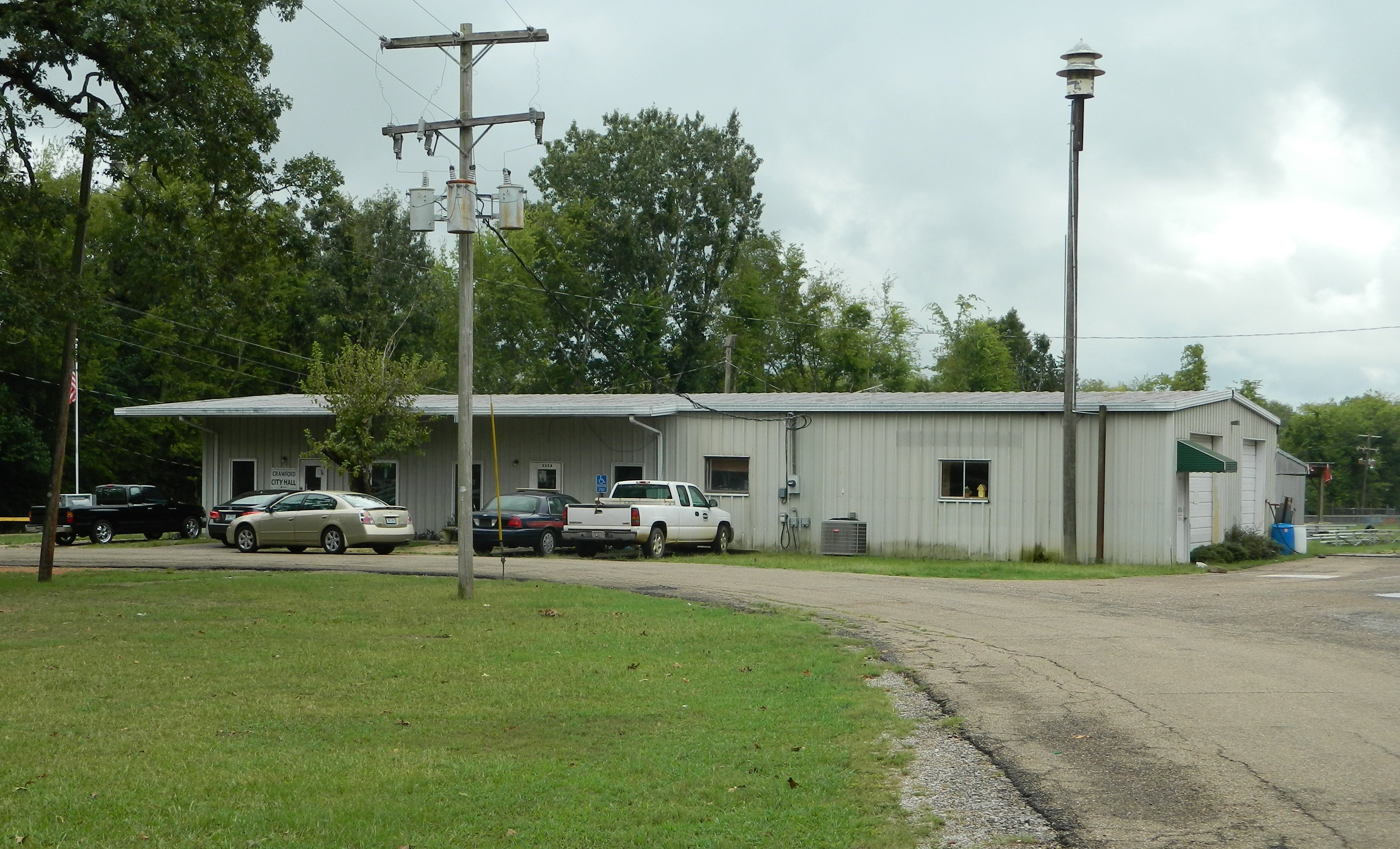
City Hall, Crawford

Crawford is located at 33°18′22″N 88°37′19″W (33.306205, -88.621933).

According to the United States Census Bureau, the town has a total area of 1.4 square miles (3.6 km^{2}), all land.

== Demographics ==
Historical population
Census	Pop.	Note	%±
1880	304		—
1890	225		−26.0%
1900	389		72.9%
1910	396		1.8%
1920	323		−18.4%
1930	349		8.0%
1940	380		8.9%
1950	374		−1.6%
1960	317		−15.2%
1970	391		23.3%
1980	495		26.6%
1990	668		34.9%
2000	655		−1.9%
2010	641		−2.1%
2020	415		−35.3%
US Decennial Census

=== Racial and ethnic composition ===
Crawford town, Mississippi – Racial and ethnic composition Note: the US Census treats Hispanic/Latino as an ethnic category. This table excludes Latinos from the racial categories and assigns them to a separate category. Hispanics/Latinos may be of any race.
Race / Ethnicity (NH = Non-Hispanic)	Pop 2000	Pop 2010	Pop 2020	% 20010	% 2010	% 2020
White alone (NH)	39	51	28	5.95%	7.96%	6.75%
Black or African American alone (NH)	607	575	377	92.67%	89.70%	90.84%
Native American or Alaska Native alone (NH)	2	4	0	0.31%	0.62%	0.00%
Asian alone (NH)	0	0	0	0.00%	0.00%	0.00%
Native Hawaiian or Pacific Islander alone (NH)	0	0	0	0.00%	0.00%	0.00%
Other race alone (NH)	0	0	0	0.00%	0.00%	0.00%
Mixed race or Multiracial (NH)	3	7	8	0.46%	1.09%	1.93%
Hispanic or Latino (any race)	4	4	2	0.61%	0.62%	0.48%
Total	655	641	415	100.00%	100.00%	100.00%

=== 2010 census ===
As of the 2010 United States census, there were 641 people in the town. 89.9% were African American, 8.0% White, 0.6% Native American and 1.6% of two or more races. 0.6% were Hispanic or Latino of any race.

=== 2000 census ===
As of the 2000 United States census there were 655 people, 209 households, and 163 families in the town. The population density was 466.7 inhabitants per square mile (180.2/km^{2}). There were 251 housing units at an average density of 178.9 per square mile (69.1/km^{2}). The racial makeup of the town was 93.13% African American, 5.95% White, 0.31% Native American, 0.15% from other races, and 0.46% from two or more races. Hispanic or Latino of any race were 0.61% of the population.

There were 309 households, out of which 45.0% had children under the age of 18 living with them, 31.6% were married couples living together, 42.1% had a female householder with no husband present, and 22.0% were non-families. 20.6% of all households were made up of individuals, and 7.7% had someone living alone who was 65 years of age or older. The average household size was 3.13 and the average family size was 3.67.

The town population contained 41.5% under the age of 18, 9.0% from 18 to 24, 25.6% from 25 to 44, 17.1% from 45 to 64, and 6.7% who were 65 years of age or older. The median age was 24 years. For every 100 females, there were 75.1 males. For every 100 females age 18 and over, there were 67.2 males.

The median income for a household in the town was $16,786, and the median income for a family was $16,058. Males had a median income of $24,107 versus $14,359 for females. The per capita income for the town was $7,123. About 45.5% of families and 45.7% of the population are below the poverty line, including 60.5% of those under age 18 and 35.3% of those age 65 or over.

== Education ==
The Town of Crawford is served by the Lowndes County School District.

East Mississippi Community College is the designated community college for Lowndes County.

== Notable people ==
- Thomas Watt Gregory, US Attorney General from 1914 to 1919
- Sam Hairston, former Negro league baseball and MLB player
- Jerry Rice, NFL first ballot Hall of Fame wide receiver
- Don "Cadillac Don" Sharp, rap/hip-hop artist
- Clarence Weatherspoon, NBA player
- Big Joe Williams, Mississippi Musicians Hall of Fame blues singer and guitarist; born in Crawford in 1903

== See also ==
- Crawford City Hall (contact information)
- Hairston: History of Crawford, Lowndes County, Mississippi
