= Artesia, Mississippi =

- Town
- Location of Artesia, Mississippi

- Location in Mississippi Artesia (the United States) Artesia (North America)
- Coordinates: 33°24′58″N 88°38′43″W
- Country: United States
- State: Mississippi
- County: Lowndes

Area
  - Total: 0.73 sq mi (1.88 km^{2})
  - Land: 0.72 sq mi (1.87 km^{2})
  - Water: 0 sq mi (0.00 km^{2})
- Elevation: 230 ft (70 m)

Population (2020)
  - Total: 304
  - Density: 420.5/sq mi (162.37/km^{2})
- Time zone: UTC-6 (Central (CST))
  - Summer (DST): UTC-5 (CDT)
- ZIP code: 39736
- Area code: 662
- FIPS code: 28-02100
- GNIS feature ID: 0666384

Artesia is a town in Lowndes County, Mississippi. The population was 304 at the 2020 census, down from 440 at the 2010 census.

== History ==
Artesia was originally named Tolands Depot until October 21, 1860, then later Artesia Junction.

The Mobile and Ohio Railroad built a line through the town around August, 1856. A post office and train station was opened with the name Tolands Depot on August 27, 1856.

During the railroad's construction in the 1850s, an offer was made to the towns of Columbus and Aberdeen to route the railroad through the towns, but both towns refused. Columbus reconsidered a few months later; but by that time, the railway had already chosen a route well to the west of the town. However, the railroad did extend a spur line in order to serve Columbus, and that spur line joins the main line at the site of present-day Artesia.

Artesia was the site of a voter suppression incident in 1876 in which a group of heavily armed white men from Starkville came to intimidate black voters in the Republican Club. Federal troops were called to intervene, which enraged many whites, who depicted the event as a negro riot.

The name originates from a cluster of artesian wells that were found in the area.

== Geography ==
Artesia is located at 33°24′58″N 88°38′43″W (33.416077, -88.645249).

According to the United States Census Bureau, the town has a total area of 0.8 square miles (2.1 km^{2}), of which 0.7 square miles (1.8 km^{2}) is land and 1.33% is water.

== Demographics ==
=== Racial and ethnic composition ===
Artesia town, Mississippi – Racial and ethnic composition Note: the US Census treats Hispanic/Latino as an ethnic category. This table excludes Latinos from the racial categories and assigns them to a separate category. Hispanics/Latinos may be of any race.
Race / Ethnicity (NH = Non-Hispanic)	Pop 2000	Pop 2010	Pop 2020	% 20010	% 2010	% 2020
White alone (NH)	96	56	33	19.28%	12.73%	10.86%
Black or African American alone (NH)	395	372	258	79.32%	84.55%	84.87%
Native American or Alaska Native alone (NH)	0	0	0	0.00%	0.00%	0.00%
Asian alone (NH)	0	5	1	0.00%	1.14%	0.33%
Native Hawaiian or Pacific Islander alone (NH)	2	0	0	0.40%	0.00%	0.00%
Other race alone (NH)	0	0	1	0.00%	0.00%	0.33%
Mixed race or Multiracial (NH)	1	5	0	0.20%	1.14%	0.00%
Hispanic or Latino (any race)	4	2	11	0.80%	0.45%	3.62%
Total	498	440	304	100.00%	100.00%	100.00%

=== 2020 census ===
As of the 2020 census, there were 304 people, 159 households, and 185 families.

=== 2010 census ===
As of the 2010 United States census, there were 440 people living in the town. 84.5% were African American, 13.0% White, 1.1% Asian, 0.2% from some other race and 1.1% of two or more races. 0.5% were Hispanic or Latino of any race.

As of the census of 2000, there were 498 people, 176 households, and 124 families living in the town. The population density was 671.8 inhabitants per square mile (259.4/km^{2}). There were 196 housing units at an average density of 264.4 per square mile (102.1/km^{2}). The racial makeup of the town was 79.32% African American, 19.88% White, 0.20% Asian, 0.40% Pacific Islander, and 0.20% from two or more races. Hispanic or Latino of any race were 0.80% of the population.

There were 176 households, out of which 39.8% had children under the age of 18 living with them, 34.7% were married couples living together, 30.7% had a female householder with no husband present, and 29.0% were non-families. 27.3% of all households were made up of individuals, and 12.5% had someone living alone who was 65 years of age or older. The average household size was 2.83 and the average family size was 3.50.

Historical population
Census	Pop.	Note	%±
1880	150		—
1890	313		108.7%
1900	343		9.6%
1910	535		56.0%
1920	583		9.0%
1930	612		5.0%
1940	521		−14.9%
1950	594		14.0%
1960	469		−21.0%
1970	444		−5.3%
1980	526		18.5%
1990	484		−8.0%
2000	498		2.9%
2010	440		−11.6%
2020	304		−30.9%
U.S. Decennial Census

In the town, the population was spread out, with 33.7% under the age of 18, 10.4% from 18 to 24, 27.5% from 25 to 44, 18.1% from 45 to 64, and 10.2% who were 65 years of age or older. The median age was 28 years. For every 100 females, there were 86.5 males. For every 100 females age 18 and over, there were 83.3 males.

The median income for a household in the town was $18,438, and the median income for a family was $21,429. Males had a median income of $20,000 versus $13,750 for females. The per capita income for the town was $8,716. About 42.2% of families and 43.0% of the population were below the poverty line, including 60.0% of those under age 18 and 13.0% of those age 65 or over.

== Education ==
Artesia is served by the Lowndes County School District.

East Mississippi Community College is the designated community college for Lowndes County.

== Notable people ==
- Jim Roberts, former pitcher for the Brooklyn Robins
