= Mobile and Ohio Railroad =

Defunct railroad in the Southern U.S.

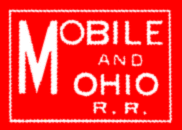
- M&O at its peak in 1940. Main line shown in red, branches in blue. Courtesy: OpenHistoricalMap
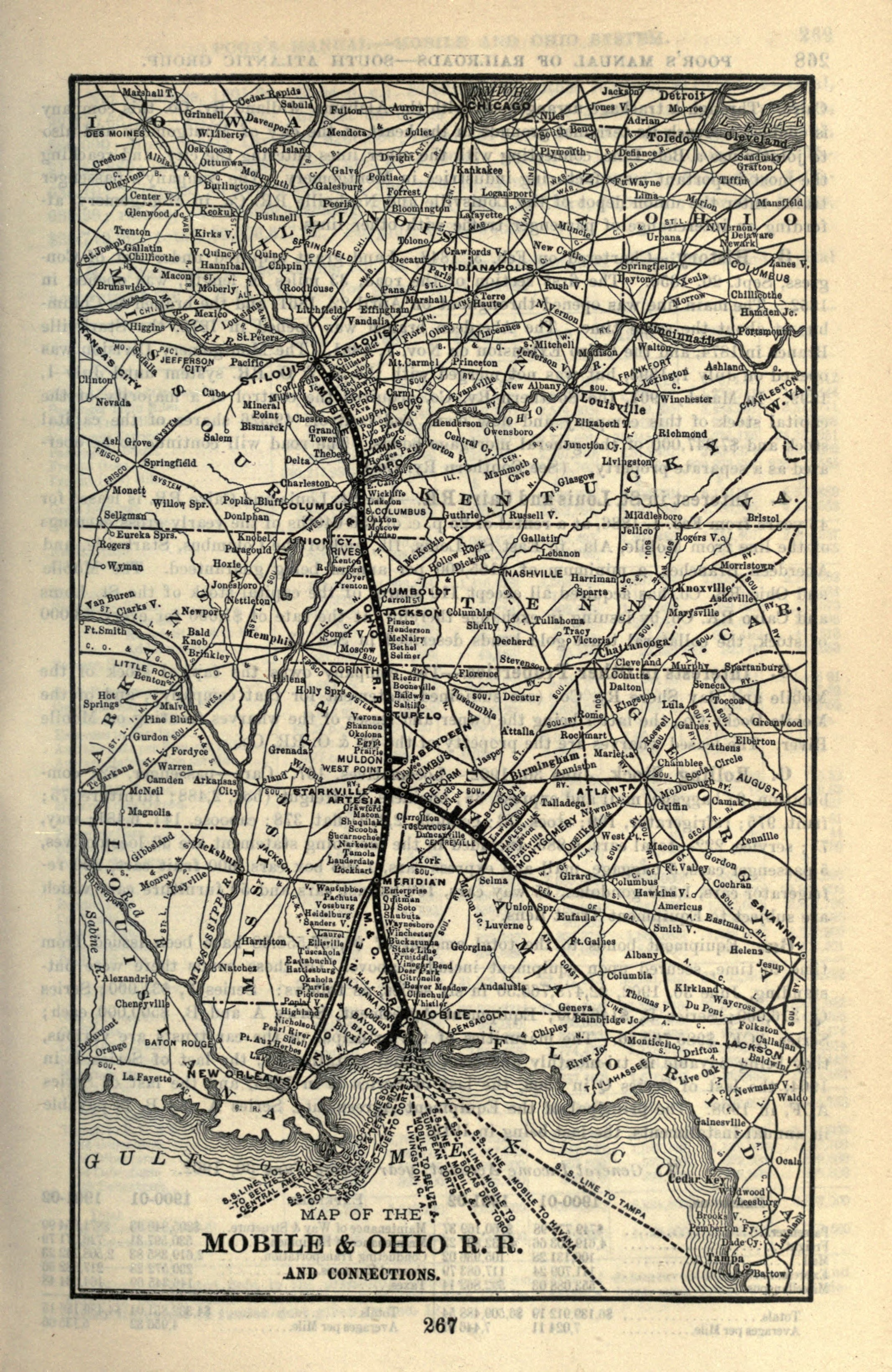
- System map of the Mobile & Ohio in 1903

Overview
- Headquarters: Mobile, Alabama
- Locale: Southern United States
- Dates of operation: 1848–1940
- Successor: Gulf, Mobile and Ohio

Technical
- Track gauge: 4 ft 8 1/2 in (1,435 mm) standard gauge
- Previous gauge: 5 ft (1,524 mm) until 1885

The Mobile and Ohio Railroad (M&O) was a railroad in the Southern U.S. The M&O was chartered in January and February 1848 by the states of Alabama, Kentucky, Mississippi, and Tennessee. It was planned to span the distance between the seaport of Mobile, Alabama,and the Ohio River near Cairo, Illinois. On September 13, 1940, it was merged with the Gulf, Mobile and Northern Railroad to form the Gulf, Mobile and Ohio Railroad.

At the end of 1925 M&O operated 1,161 miles (1,868 km) of road and 1,536 miles (2,472 km) of track; that year it reported 1,785 million ton-miles of revenue freight and 49 million passenger-miles.

== History ==
The Mobile and Ohio Railroad was conceived after hard times in Mobile following the Panic of 1837. The port was not generating the business that it had before the panic and businessmen and citizens in the city were inspired with a plan for a railroad to restore commerce to the city.

=== Construction ===
Construction began February 1, 1852. The first section of track opened for service by July 23, 1852 between Mobile and Citronelle, Alabama, and was constructed in 5 ft (1,524 mm) gauge. By 1854, the track had been completed through Wayne County, Mississippi. In 1855, the line was extended through Clarke County, Mississippi, as far as Enterprise. On March 12, 1856, the line reached Lauderdale, Mississippi. The line reached Crawford, Mississippi, around November 11, 1857. Based on the construction dates of post offices, West Point around November 1858, Prairie around January 1860, Verona around July 1860, Tupelo around October 1860, and Booneville around November 1860.

During the construction, a branch was extended from the main line at Artesia to Columbus, Mississippi. The first four miles of the branch were completed by September 1858. In July 1859, the branch had been extended to the west bank of the Tombigbee River, where a temporary station was established until a bridge could be built. A bridge across the river may have existed by February 1861. The branch to Columbus was used in 1862 to transport wounded soldiers from the Battle of Shiloh.

Construction began in Columbus, Kentucky, around 1858, as crews built the railroad southward to eventually connect both ends of the road. The line reached Dyer, Tennessee, in 1858, Humboldt, Tennessee, in 1859, and Bethel Springs, Tennessee, in January 1860.

The southern line finally met the northern line in Corinth, Mississippi, extending the line all the way to Columbus, Kentucky, on April 22, 1861. steamboats were then used to connect with the Illinois Central Railroad at Cairo.

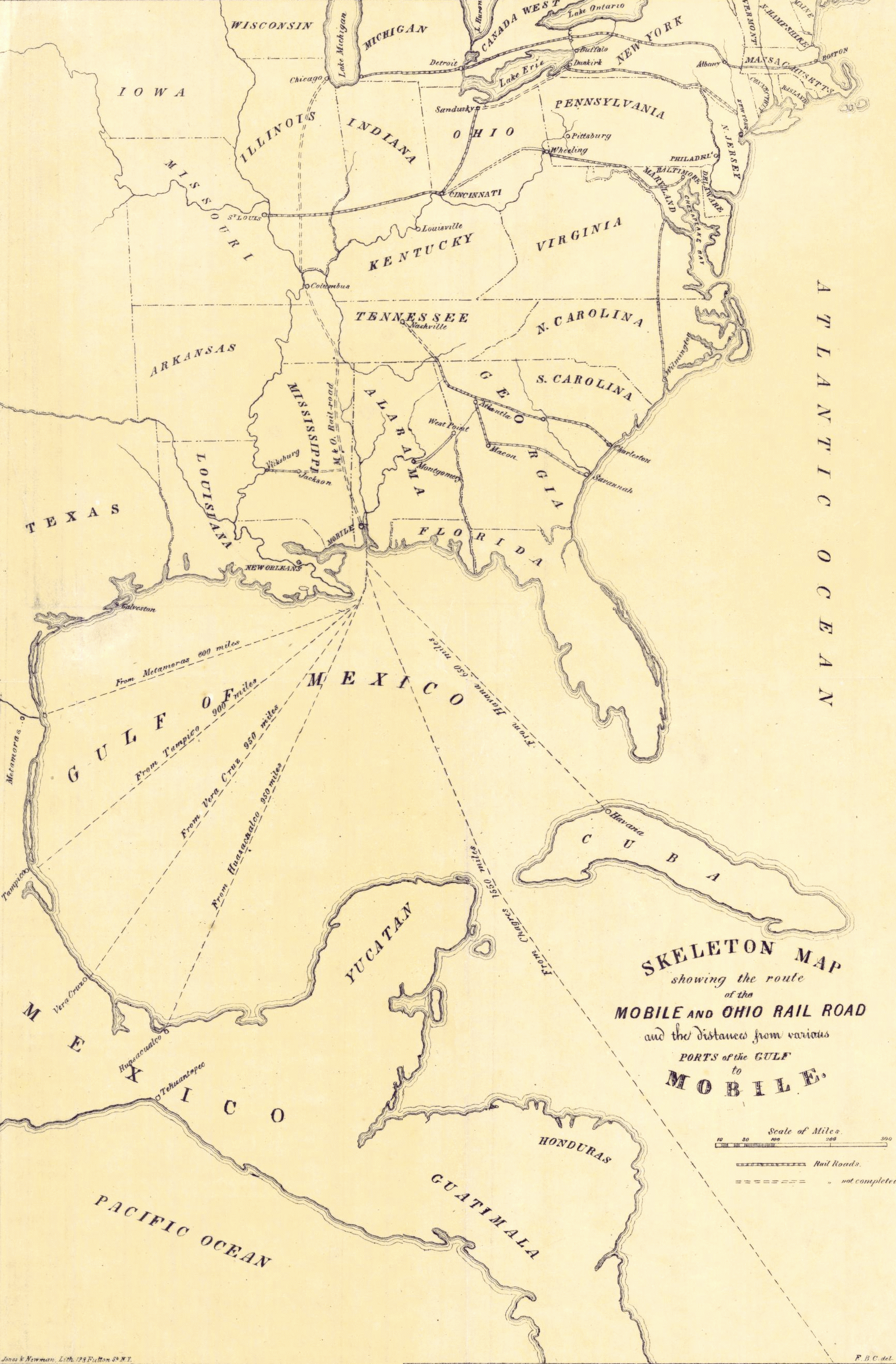
1848 map showing the planned route of the Mobile and Ohio Railroad.

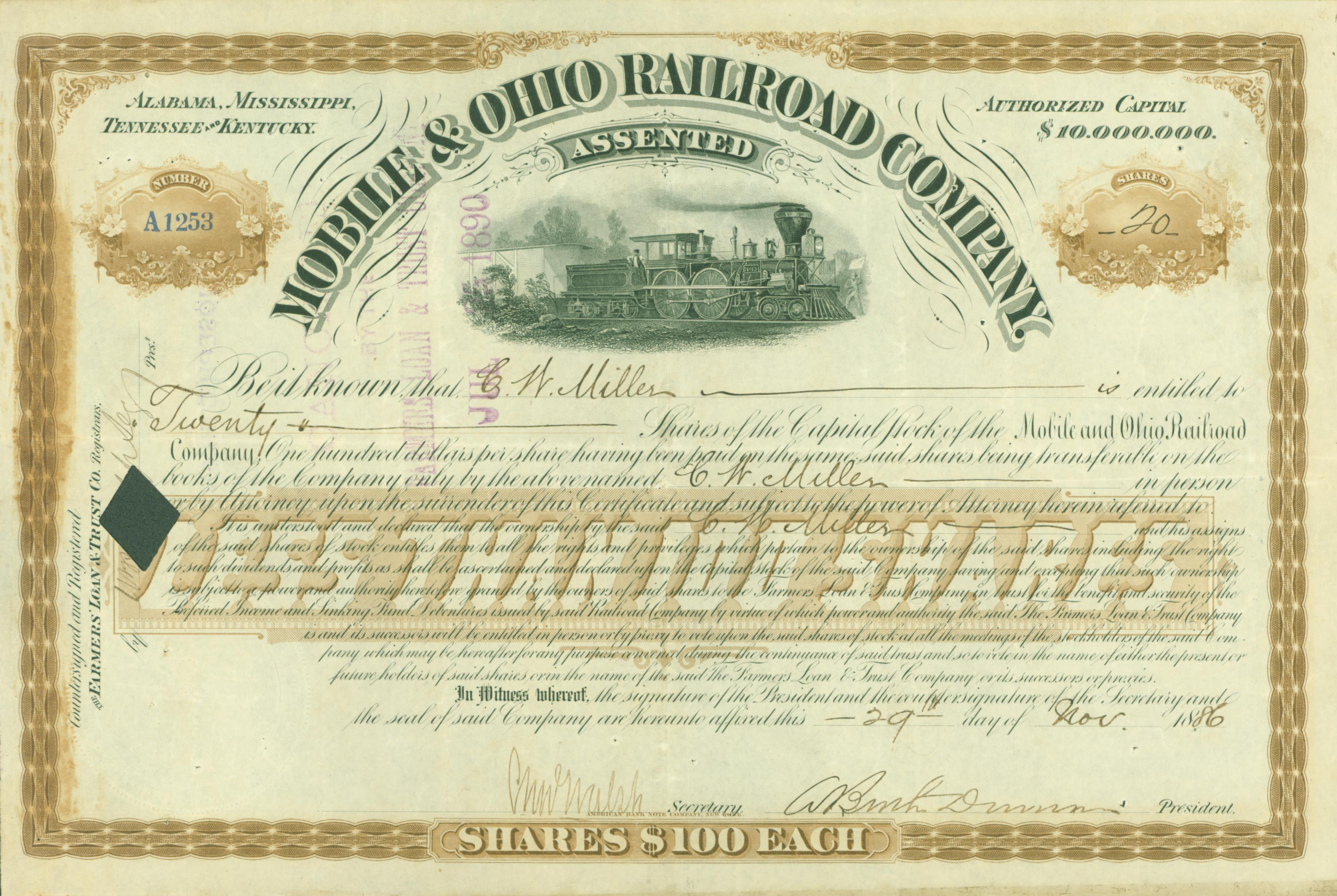
Share of the Mobile & Ohio Railroad Company, issued 29 November 1886

=== Civil War ===
The start of the Civil War shortly after the completion of the line saw it converted to military use and it quickly became a military target for both sides during the war. Following the conflict the M&O had to be almost entirely rebuilt and was facing near total financial ruin due in part to an unpaid debt of $5,228,562 owed by the Confederate government. It was placed in receivership in 1875 and did not emerge until eight years later.

By the end of the war, 184 miles of track had been completely destroyed, and the remainder in poor condition. Stations, warehouses, and bridges across the entire route had been damaged or destroyed, with much being destroyed during the Meridian campaign.

=== Expansion ===
In 1870, a branch was built from the main line at Aberdeen Junction, later Muldon, Mississippi, connecting the city of Aberdeen. In 1967 the grade from Muldon was converted into part of Mississippi Highway 25.

By 1870 the operators saw the need to complete the line all the way to Cairo and make it the northern terminus instead of Columbus, but financial problems stood in the way. Finally on May 1, 1882, the extension to Cairo was opened. The company then acquired the St. Louis and Cairo Railroad, which was narrow gauge. They converted it to 4 ft 8 1/2 in (1,435 mm) standard gauge and had a line from Mobile to St. Louis, Missouri.

In 1875, a branch was built to Starkville, cutting through the future campus of the Mississippi State University.

The entire railroad was converted to standard gauge in 1885 — a year prior to the massive conversion of the other southern railroads.

In 1896 the company decided to build a line from its Columbus, Mississippi, terminal toward Florida. On June 30, 1898, the Tuscaloosa to Montgomery line opened in Alabama, along with two short branch lines. That same year they decided to build a 39-mile (63 km) line from Mobile to Alabama Port and Bayou La Batre, naming it the Mobile and Bay Shore Railway. It was completed in 1899.

=== Southern Railway ===
The M&O's stockholders and bondholders accepted a stock exchange plan in 1901 from Southern Railway. A merger of the two was attempted in 1902 but vetoed by Mississippi governor James K. Vardaman. Thereafter the M&O continued operations under Southern's control.

In 1906, a branch was built by Southern Railway from the station at Okolona, Mississippi, to Calhoun City, Mississippi. The line was operated by the Mobile and Ohio until April 17, 1933, when it was sold to form the Okolona, Houston and Calhoun City Railway, which dissolved January 5, 1940.

From 1908 the M&O was considered to be a highly prosperous railroad, but net income declined sharply after 1926 and by 1930 the M&O had a net deficit of almost $1,000,000. On June 3, 1932, the M&O went into receivership again. Southern was accused of having violated the Clayton Antitrust Act by using the M&O for its own profit at the expense of the M&O, though the case was dropped in 1933. Southern sold its M&O bonds September 13, 1940 to the Gulf, Mobile and Northern Railroad. The GM&N was then combined with the M&O to form the Gulf, Mobile and Ohio Railroad.

== See also ==
- List of defunct Alabama railroads
- List of defunct Illinois railroads
- List of defunct Kentucky railroads
- List of defunct Mississippi railroads
- List of defunct Missouri railroads
- List of defunct Tennessee railroads
