= Agricultural Experiment Stations Act of 1887 =

United States federal law

- Long title: An Act to establish agricultural experiment stations in connection with the colleges established in the several States under the provisions of an act approved July second, eighteen hundred and sixty-two, and of the acts supplementary thereto.
- Nicknames: Hatch Act of 1887
- Enacted by: the 49th United States Congress
- Effective: March 2, 1887

Citations
- Public law: Pub. L. 49–314
- Statutes at Large: 24 Stat. 440

Codification
- Titles amended: 7 U.S.C.: Agriculture
- U.S.C. sections created: 7 U.S.C. ch. 14 § 361 et seq.

Legislative history
- Introduced in the Senate as S. 372; Passed the Senate on January 25, 1887 (25-16); Signed into law by President Grover Cleveland on March 2, 1887

Agricultural Experiment Stations Act of 1887 is a United States federal statute establishing agricultural research by the governance of the United States land-grant colleges as enacted by the Land-Grant Agricultural and Mechanical College Act of 1862. The agricultural experiment station alliance was granted fiscal appropriations by the enactment of the Hatch Act of 1887. The Act of Congress defines the basis of the agricultural experiments and scientific research by the State or Territory educational institutions.

== Scope of Agricultural Research ==
- Physiology of plants and animals
- Diseases to which they are exposed to include antidotes for determined diseases
- Chemical composition of useful plants at their different stages of growth
- Comparative advantages of rotative cropping as pursued under a varying series of crops
- Capacity of new plants or trees for acclimation
- Analysis of soils and water
- Chemical composition of manures, natural, or artificial, with experiments designed to test their comparative effects on crops of different kinds
- Adaptation and value of grasses and forage plants
- Composition and digestibility of the different kinds of food for domestic animals
- Scientific and economic questions involved in the production of butter and cheese
- Other researches or experiments bearing directly on the agricultural industry of the United States as may in each case be deemed advisable, having due regard to the varying conditions and needs of the respective States or Territories

== Concession of Agricultural Experiment Stations ==
December 4, 1893: First Annual Message to the Congress of the United States

"In each State and Territory an agricultural experiment station has been established. These stations, by their very character and name, are the proper agencies to experiment with and test new varieties of seeds; and yet this indiscriminate and wasteful distribution by legislation and legislators continues, answering no purpose unless it be to remind constituents that their representatives are willing to remember them with gratuities at public cost.

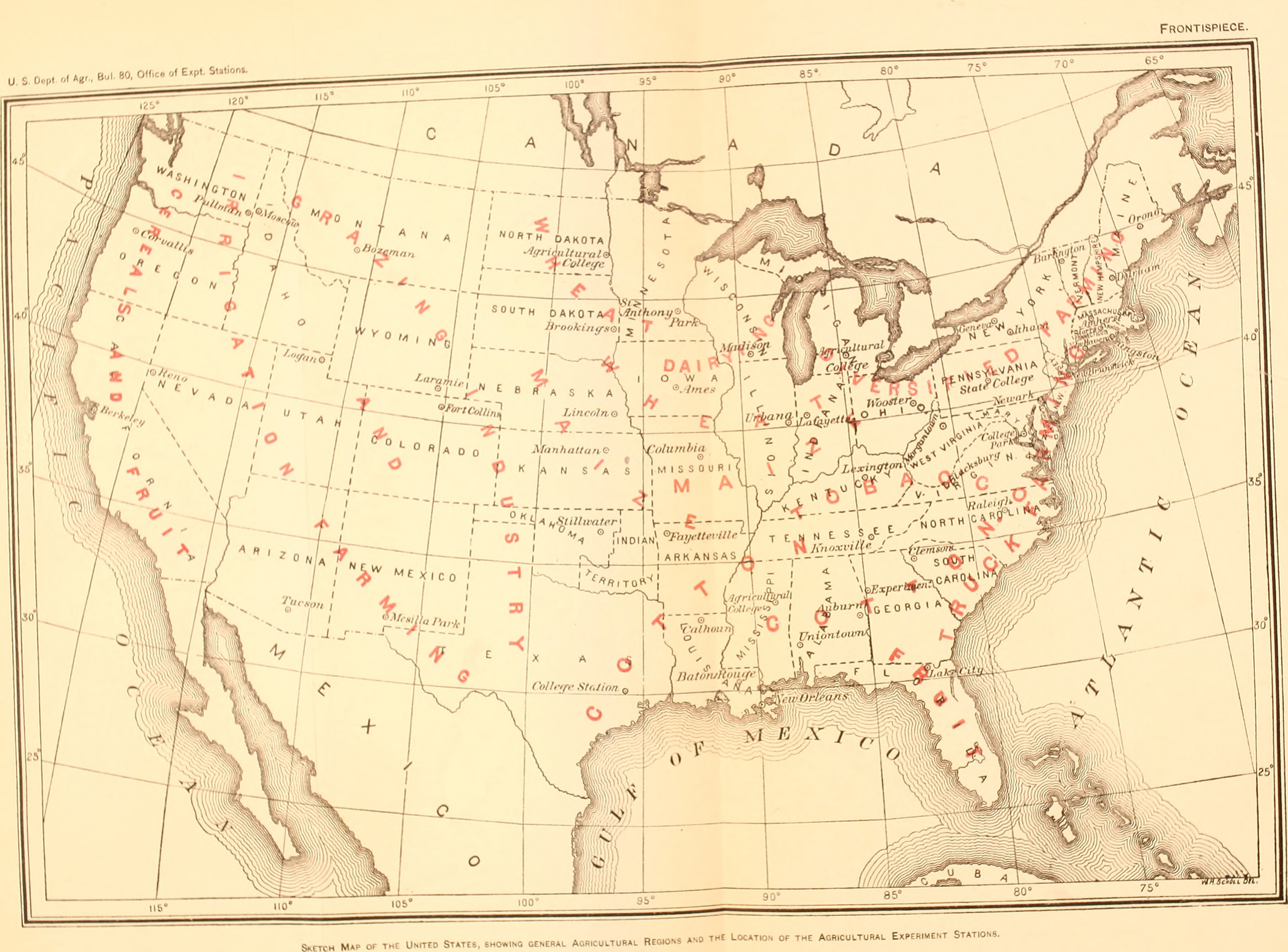
Agricultural experiment stations in the United States by 1900

Under the sanction of existing legislation there was sent out from the Agricultural Department during the last fiscal year enough of cabbage seed to plant 19,200 acres of land, a sufficient quantity of beans to plant 4,000 acres, beet seed enough to plant 2,500 acres, sweet corn enough to plant 7,800 acres, sufficient cucumber seed to cover 2,025 acres with vines, and enough muskmelon and watermelon seeds to plant 2,675 acres. The total quantity of flower and vegetable seeds thus distributed was contained in more than 9,000,000 packages, and they were sufficient if planted to cover 89,596 acres of land.

In view of these facts this enormous expenditure without legitimate returns of benefit ought to be abolished. Anticipating a consummation so manifestly in the interest of good administration, more than $100,000 has been stricken from the estimate made to cover this object for the year ending June 30, 1895; and the Secretary recommends that the remaining $35,000 of the estimate be confined strictly to the purchase of new and improved varieties of seeds, and that these be distributed through experiment stations.

Thus the seed will be tested, and after the test has been completed by the experiment station the propagation of the useful varieties and the rejection of the valueless may safely be left to the common sense of the people."

- Grover Cleveland, 22nd and 24th President of the United States

== Related U.S. Statutes of 1887 Act ==
U.S. Congressional Provisions for Agricultural Experiment Stations

Date of Enactment	Public Law No.	U.S. Statute	U.S. Bill No.	U.S. Presidential Administration
February 23, 1901	Pub. Res. 56-9	31 Stat. 1462	H.J.Res. 9	Rutherford B. Hayes
March 16, 1906	P.L. 59-47	34 Stat. 63	H.R. 345	Theodore Roosevelt
February 24, 1925	P.L. 68-458	43 Stat. 970	H.R. 157	Warren G. Harding
March 3, 1927	P.L. 69-770	44 Stat. 1397	H.R. 17138	Calvin Coolidge
February 23, 1929	P.L. 70-797	45 Stat. 1256	H.R. 13882	Calvin Coolidge
March 4, 1931	P.L. 71-846	46 Stat. 1520	S. 5524	Herbert Hoover
August 11, 1955	P.L. 84-352	69 Stat. 671	S. 1759	Dwight D. Eisenhower
July 22, 1963	P.L. 88-74	77 Stat. 90	H.R. 40	John F. Kennedy
March 5, 1987	P.L. 100-7	101 Stat. 96	H.J.Res. 3	Ronald Reagan

== See also ==
Agricultural Experiment Station Barn
Bureau of Animal Industry
Farmers' Bulletin
Henry Leavitt Ellsworth
History of agriculture in the United States
List of land-grant universities
Mechanised agriculture
Smith–Lever Act of 1914
United States Department of Agriculture
