= Mississippi State University =

Public university near Starkville, Mississippi, US

Mississippi State University for Agriculture and Applied Science
- Former names: The Agricultural and Mechanical College of the State of Mississippi (1878–1932); Mississippi State College (1932–1958)
- Motto: "Learning, Service, Research"
- Type: Public land-grant research university
- Established: February 28, 1878; 148 years ago
- Parent institution: Mississippi Institutions of Higher Learning
- Accreditation: SACS
- Academic affiliations: ORAU; sea-grant; space-grant
- Endowment: $1 billion (2025)
- President: Mark Keenum
- Faculty: 1,359
- Administrative staff: 3,361
- Students: 23,150 (fall 2024)
- Location: Mississippi State, Mississippi, United States; 33°27′14″N 88°47′20″W
- Campus: 4,200 acres (17 km^{2}); Remote town
- Other campuses: Biloxi; Gautier; Meridian; Stennis Space Center
- Newspaper: The Reflector
- Colors: Maroon and white
- Nickname: Bulldogs
- Sporting affiliations: NCAA Division I FBS – SEC
- Mascot: Bully the Bulldog
- Website: msstate.edu

Mississippi State University for Agriculture and Applied Science, commonly known as Mississippi State University (MSU), is a public land-grant research university in Mississippi State, Mississippi, United States. It is classified among "R1: Doctoral Universities – Very High Research Spending and Doctorate Production".

The university was chartered as Mississippi Agricultural & Mechanical College on February 28, 1878, and admitted its first students in 1880. Organized into 12 colleges and schools, the university offers over 180 baccalaureate, graduate, and professional degree programs, and is home to Mississippi's only accredited programs in architecture and veterinary medicine. Mississippi State participates in the National Sea Grant College Program and National Space Grant College and Fellowship Program. The university's main campus adjacent to the city of Starkville is supplemented by auxiliary campuses in Meridian, Gautier, and Biloxi.

Mississippi State's intercollegiate sports teams, the Mississippi State Bulldogs, compete in NCAA Division I athletics as members of the Southeastern Conference. Mississippi State was a founding member of the SEC in 1932. In their more-than 120-year history, the Bulldogs have won 21 individual national championships, 30 regular season conference championships, and 1 national championship title. The school is noted for a pervasive baseball fan culture, with Dudy Noble Field holding all of the top 26 all-time NCAA attendance records and the school's Left Field Lounge being described as an epicenter of college baseball.

== History ==
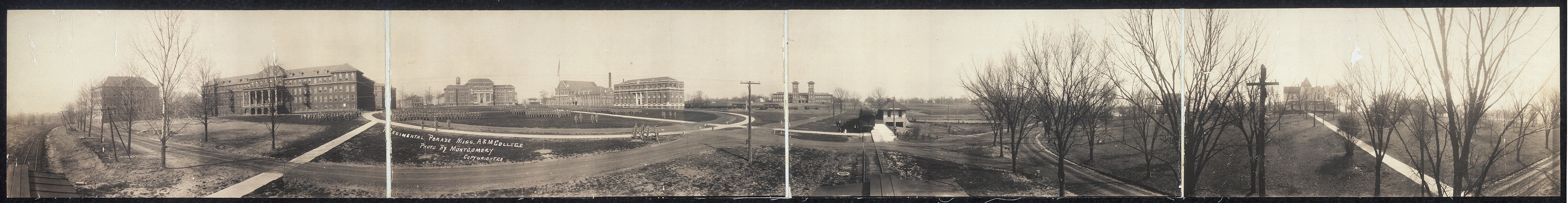
Mississippi State in 1914

The university began as The Agricultural and Mechanical College of the State of Mississippi (or Mississippi A&M), one of the national land-grant colleges established after Congress passed the Morrill Act in 1862. It was created by the Mississippi Legislature on February 28, 1878, to offer training in "agriculture, horticulture and the mechanical arts ... without excluding other scientific and classical studies, including military tactics." The university received its first students in the fall of 1880 in the presidency of General Stephen D. Lee.

In 1887 Congress passed the Hatch Act, which provided for the establishment of the Agricultural Experiment Station in 1888. The Cooperative Extension Service was established in 1914 by the Smith-Lever Act. The university has since had its mission expanded and redefined by the Legislature. In 1932, the Legislature renamed the university as Mississippi State College.

In 1958 the Legislature renamed the university Mississippi State University in recognition of its academic development and addition of graduate programs. The Graduate School had been organized (1936), doctoral degree programs had begun (1951), the School of Forest Resources had been established (1954), and the College of Arts and Sciences had replaced the General Science School (1956).

The university was desegregated in July 1965, when Richard E. Holmes became the first African-American student to enroll. The Civil Rights Act of 1964 was passed by Congress the year before, the Voting Rights Act of 1965 was being debated, and the United States Supreme Court had ruled in Brown v. Board of Education (1954) that segregation of public schools was unconstitutional.

The School of Architecture admitted its first students in 1973, the College of Veterinary Medicine admitted its first class in 1977. The MSU Vet school is the largest veterinary school under one roof in the nation. The School of Accountancy was established in 1979. The University Honors Program was founded in 1968 to provide more rigorous course curricula and support guest speakers. The program has now has a separate college, the Judy and Bobby Shackouls Honors College.

MSU started a joint Ph.D. program in engineering with San Jose State University in California. In March 2009, Mississippi State announced the conclusion of the university's seven-year capital campaign, with more than $462 million received in private gifts and pledges.

On March 24, 2012, a 21-year-old student at the university named John Sanderson was shot twice and killed inside the Evans Hall Dormitory on campus. Mason Perry Jones later pleaded guilty to murder and was sentenced to life with the possibility of parole.

== Campuses ==
Lee Hall on the Mississippi State University

The Drill Field on the campus at Mississippi State University

The main campus is mostly in the Mississippi State census-designated place, with a small part in Starkville.

Mississippi State's campus is centered on the main quadrangle, called the Drill Field due to its heavy use by the Corps of Cadets prior to the end of World War II. The Drill Field is defined at its north and south ends by the mirror-image buildings, Lee Hall and Swalm Hall. Old Main was the original dormitory, west of Lee Hall; it burned in a tragic fire, and was replaced by the Colvard Student Union. The largest building on Drill Field is Mitchell Memorial Library.

Beyond the main campus (and the series of commuter parking lots ringing the main campus) are the North and South Farms. While still used for their original purpose of agricultural research, the Farms are also host to newer facilities, such as the astronomical observatory and Veterinary College (South Farm) and the High Performance Computing Collaboratory (North Farm). At the far west of campus, one finds first the fraternity and sorority houses, and beyond them the Cotton District and downtown Starkville, Mississippi. The university is also home to the Thad Cochran Research, Technology and Economic Development Park, which host many of the university's research centers, such as the Center for Advanced Vehicular Systems (CAVS) and the nationally recognized Social Science Research Center. The Williams Building, which houses the MSU Police Department was designed by architect Emmett J. Hull.

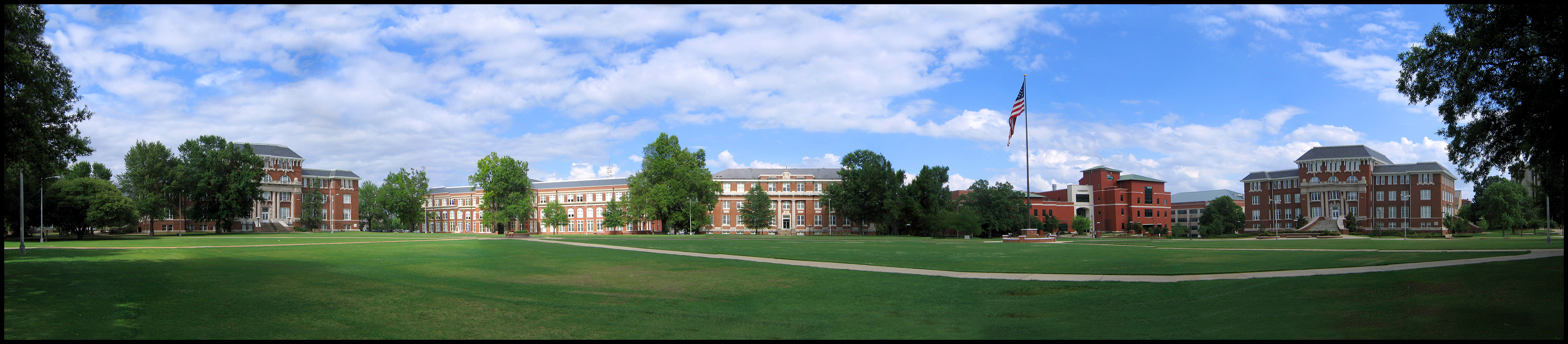
The Drill Field and surrounding buildings

Mississippi State University operates an off-campus, degree-granting center in Meridian, Mississippi that offers undergraduate and graduate programs. In cooperation with the U.S. Army Engineer Waterways Experiment Station, the College of Engineering offers the Master of Science degree to students in Vicksburg, Mississippi.

=== Mitchell Memorial Library ===
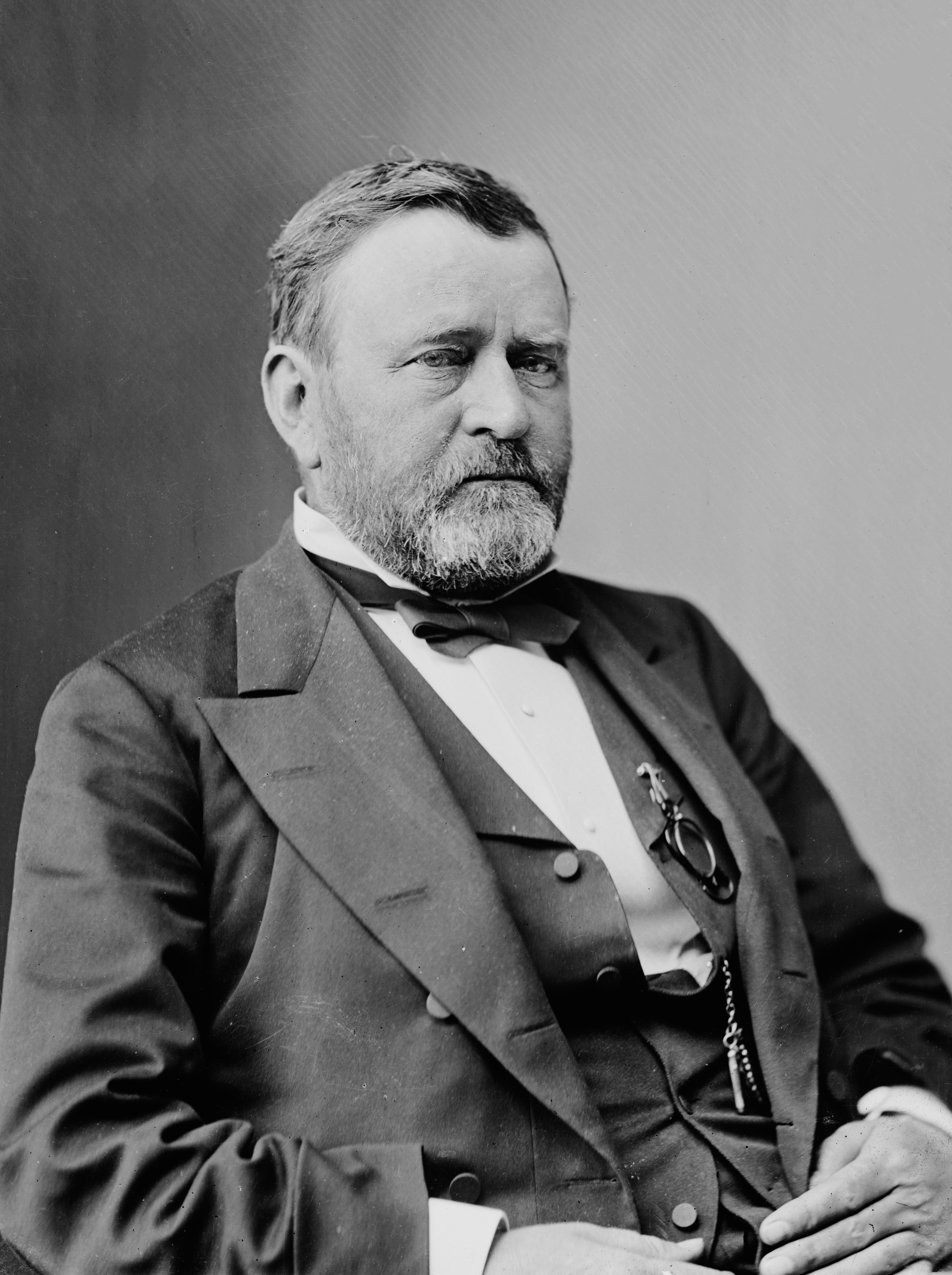
Mississippi State University is home to the Ulysses S. Grant Presidential Collection.

The Mitchell Memorial Library is in the heart of the campus, on the eastern side of the Drill Field. The library has a collection of 2,124,341 volumes and 70,331 journals.

Mississippi State is one of the few universities to house presidential papers. In May 2012, on the 50th anniversary of the founding of the Ulysses S. Grant Association, Mississippi State University was selected as the permanent location for Ulysses S. Grant's Presidential Library. President Grant's artifacts are to remain permanently at the Mitchell Memorial Library on the MSU campus. These include Grant's letters and photographs during his presidency, from 1869 to 1877. The MSU library catalogued and cross-referenced 15,000 linear feet of material. Grant's letters have been edited and published in 32 volumes by the Ulysses S. Grant Association and the Southern Illinois University Press.

The library is also home to the Congressional and Political Research Center, which is on the first floor. This center, established in November 1999, houses the collections of US Senator John C. Stennis and Congressman G. V. Montgomery, nicknamed "Sonny". Their careers spanned a total of 72 years of service as Congressional leaders. The center also provides research materials and information on individual US Senators and Representatives, the US Congress, and politics at all levels of government.

Among the library's premier collections is that of internationally known author John Grisham, an MSU alumnus who donated his papers to the university in 1989. Grisham's collection, now consisting of over 42 cubic feet, has also attracted national attention to the library. Materials from the Grisham papers are on display in Mitchell Memorial Library's John Grisham Room (3rd floor), which opened in May 1998. The libraries also receive his published works, including foreign-language translations.

In 2000, the Charles H. Templeton Collection, which includes over 200 nineteenth- and twentieth-century music instruments, 22,000 pieces of sheet music, and 13,000 records, was transferred to the Libraries. According to author and musicologist David A. Jasen, the Templeton Collection contains the most complete collection of Victor Talking Machines from their debut in 1897 to 1930. This collection was valued at over $495,000 in 1989. Items from the collection are on display at the Templeton Music Museum on the 4th floor of Mitchell Memorial Library. In 2001, a digitization project was established to digitize and provide access to the entire sheet music collection. The project has digitized, archived, and cataloged over 6,000 pieces of music.

The library hosts the Charles Templeton Ragtime Jazz Festival, an annual event including lectures and live performance of historic and contemporary ragtime. The festival debuted in March 2007, the first of its kind in Mississippi. The multi-day event features seminars, tours of the Templeton Music Museum, and concerts by ragtime and jazz musicians.

=== The Junction ===
The Junction on the campus of Mississippi State University

Formerly the poorly-conceived convergence of five often-congested roadways and, earlier, a rail line, this student-inspired concept got its name from the term "Malfunction Junction", the informal name of the crossroads prior to the vacation and rerouting of some of the roadways. This resulted in improved traffic flow and ample new green space for leisure activities and events, including football tailgating.

Anchored by Davis Wade Stadium, Barnes & Noble Bookstore and the University Welcome Center, the Junction is the focal point of a pedestrian-friendly central campus and a significant gathering place for students, alumni and visitors. It is linked by paved walkways and green space to the university's other manicured "lawn", the historic Drill Field.

== Academics ==
Academic rankings

National
- Forbes: 242
- U.S. News & World Report: 214 (tie)
- Washington Monthly: 254
- WSJ/College Pulse: 401-500

Global
- ARWU: 501
- QS: 1001–1200
- THE: 601–800
- U.S. News & World Report: 810 (tie)

U.S. News & World Report National Rankings

Graduate school	2024 national rank
Veterinary Medicine	24
Engineering	80

Mississippi State University is accredited by the Commission on Colleges of the Southern Association of Colleges and Schools to award baccalaureate, master's, specialist, and doctoral degrees. The university has the following colleges and schools:

- College of Agriculture and Life Sciences
- College of Architecture Art and Design
- College of Arts and Sciences
- College of Business
- Richard C. Adkerson School of Accountancy
- College of Education
- James Worth Bagley College of Engineering
- Shackouls Honors College
- College of Forest Resources
- College of Veterinary Medicine
- School of Human Sciences

As of fall 2021, Mississippi State's enrollment was 23,086. The university has 160 buildings, and the grounds comprise about 4,200 acres (17 km^{2}), including farms, pastures, and woodlands of the Experiment Station. The university also owns an additional 80,000 acres (320 km^{2}) across the state.

== Student life ==
Undergraduate demographics as of fall 2023
Race and ethnicity	Total
White	74%
Black	15%
Hispanic	4%
Two or more races	3%
Asian	2%
International student	1%
Unknown	1%
Economic diversity
Low-income (Note: The percentage of students who received an income-based federal Pell grant intended for low-income students.)	29%
Affluent (Note: The percentage of students who are a part of the American middle class at the bare minimum.)	71%

MSU has over 300 student organizations. Prominent groups include the Student Association, Famous Maroon Band, MSU Road Runners, Alumni Delegates, Maroon VIP, Lambda Sigma, Orientation Leaders, 20 fraternities and 14 sororities, the Residence Hall Association, the Black Student Alliance, the Mississippi State University College Democrats and Republicans, Music Maker Productions, the Baptist Student Union, the Engineering Student Council, Arnold Air Society, the Stennis-Montgomery Association and ChallengeX. The University Recreation department oversees the intramural sports program. There are many international student organizations active on campus. The literary magazine Jabberwock Review is also based at MSU.

=== Student media ===
Mississippi State's local radio station is WMSV.

Prior to WMSV, Mississippi State had a student-run radio station, WMSB, which went off the air permanently at the end of the spring semester of 1986. WMSB was a low-power FM station with studios on the top floor of Lee Hall. WMSB was begun in the fall semester of 1971 in a freshman dorm room on the third floor of Critz Hall, utilizing an FM stereo transmitter that was designed and built as a high school science fair project by one of the station's founders. The station's original call letters were RHOM. Later, funding was solicited from the Student Association. Funding was approved, the low-power RCA FM transmitter was ordered and the call letters WMSB were issued by the FCC. The station was moved to studios on the top floor of Lee Hall that were formerly occupied by a student-run AM station.

The student newspaper is The Reflector, published twice per week on Tuesday and Friday. The publication was named the #1 college newspaper in the South in 2007 by the Southeast Journalism Conference. In recent years, The Reflector has remained in the top 10 college newspapers in the South.

=== Music scene ===
Mississippi State is home to WMSV, the campus radio station. During the spring semester the Old Main Music Festival takes place, it is also free to the public, and is held on the Mississippi State Campus.

The city of Starkville and the Mississippi State campus have been a tour stop for many artists, including a visit in 1965 by Johnny Cash. After Cash's performance he was arrested, which led him to write the song "Starkville City Jail".

=== Lecture series ===
Every semester Mississippi State has several distinguished speakers, including best-selling authors Greg Mortenson and Mississippi State alumnus John Grisham, former United States Secretary of State Condoleezza Rice, Academy Award-nominated Spike Lee, television science show hosts Jeff Lieberman and Dr. Neil deGrasse Tyson. Nobel laureates including Sir Harry Kroto (1996 Nobel Prize in Chemistry), J. M. G. Le Clézio (2008 Nobel Prize in Literature) and Joseph Stiglitz (2001 Nobel Memorial Prize in Economic Sciences) have also appeared.

=== Greek life ===
Mississippi State's Greek system comprises 20 fraternities (IFC and NPHC) and 14 sororities (Panhellenic and NPHC). In 2019, 24% of undergraduate men and 18% of undergraduate women were active in MSU's Greek system.

== Athletics ==
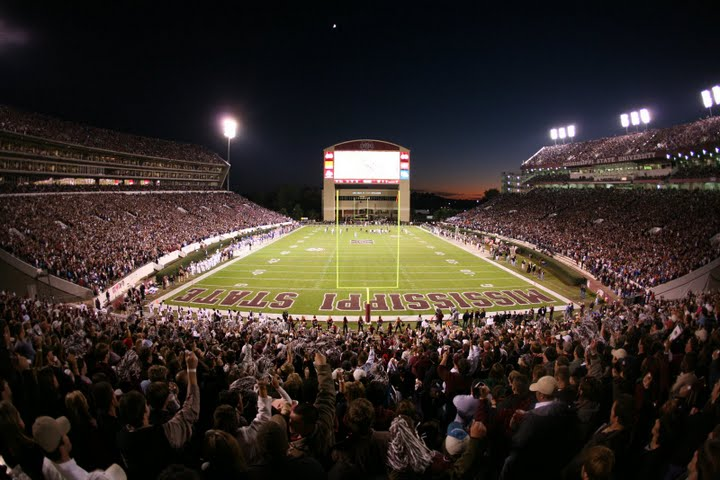
Davis Wade Stadium at the previous record-setting capacity of 58,103 against Alabama. Since renovation and expansion, the new attendance record is 62,945, set in 2014 against Auburn.

Mississippi State University's 16 athletic teams are known as the Bulldogs. Previous nicknames included the Aggies and the Maroons. They compete in Division I of the NCAA, in the 16-member Southeastern Conference (SEC).

Bulldogs athletic teams have won a total of 28 conference championships (14 SEC). Mississippi State's most successful sport is baseball. The Diamond Dogs have won 17 conference championships (11 SEC) and 6 SEC tournament championships, while making 28 NCAA Tournament appearances and 12 College World Series appearances. The Diamond Dogs play home games at Dudy Noble Field, Polk-DeMent Stadium, which holds the NCAA record for the largest single-game on-campus baseball attendance at 16,423 fans (April 15, 2023, vs. Ole Miss). After finishing runner-up in 2013, the Diamond Dogs won their first Men's College World Series in 2021, the university's first national championship in any sport.

== See also ==
- List of land-grant universities
