= Morrill Land-Grant Acts =

Law allowing the creation of colleges in the US

- Other short titles: Land-Grant Agricultural and Mechanical College Act of 1862
- Long title: An Act donating Public Lands to the several States and Territories which may provide Colleges for the Benefit of Agriculture and the Mechanic Arts.
- Nicknames: Morrill Act of 1862
- Enacted by: the 37th United States Congress
- Effective: July 2, 1862

Citations
- Public law: Pub. L. 37–130
- Statutes at Large: 12 Stat. 503

Codification
- Titles amended: 7 U.S.C.: Agriculture
- U.S.C. sections created: Later codified as 7 U.S.C. ch. 13 § 301 et seq.

Legislative history
- Introduced in the Senate as S. 298 by Justin Smith Morrill (R–VT) on May 5, 1862; Passed the Senate on June 10, 1862 (32-7); Passed the House on June 17, 1862 (91-25); Signed into law by President Abraham Lincoln on July 2, 1862

Major amendments
- Pub. L. 51–841, 26 Stat. 417, enacted August 30, 1890

The Morrill Land-Grant Acts are United States statutes that allowed for the creation of land-grant colleges in U.S. states, focusing on agricultural and mechanical studies.

The Morrill Act of 1862 (12 Stat. 503 (1862) later codified as 7 U.S.C. § 301 et seq.) was enacted during the American Civil War, and the Morrill Act of 1890 (the Agricultural College Act of 1890 (26 Stat. 417, later codified as 7 U.S.C. § 321 et seq.) expanded this model.

== History ==
=== Early attempts ===
The idea of publicly funded agricultural colleges had existed for much of the history of the United States. President George Washington called for public support of agricultural education in his 1796 address to Congress. For most of the early 19th century, the idea was prevalent among the Whig Party and what would become the Midwest.

The idea to fund agricultural colleges with public land appropriations was championed by agriculturist and professor Jonathan Baldwin Turner of Illinois College in the 1830s.

Efforts for a federal bill were stymied by antebellum politics. Southern legislators blocked attempts for an agricultural college bill. However, some Northern states introduced and funded their own, years prior to the national bill.

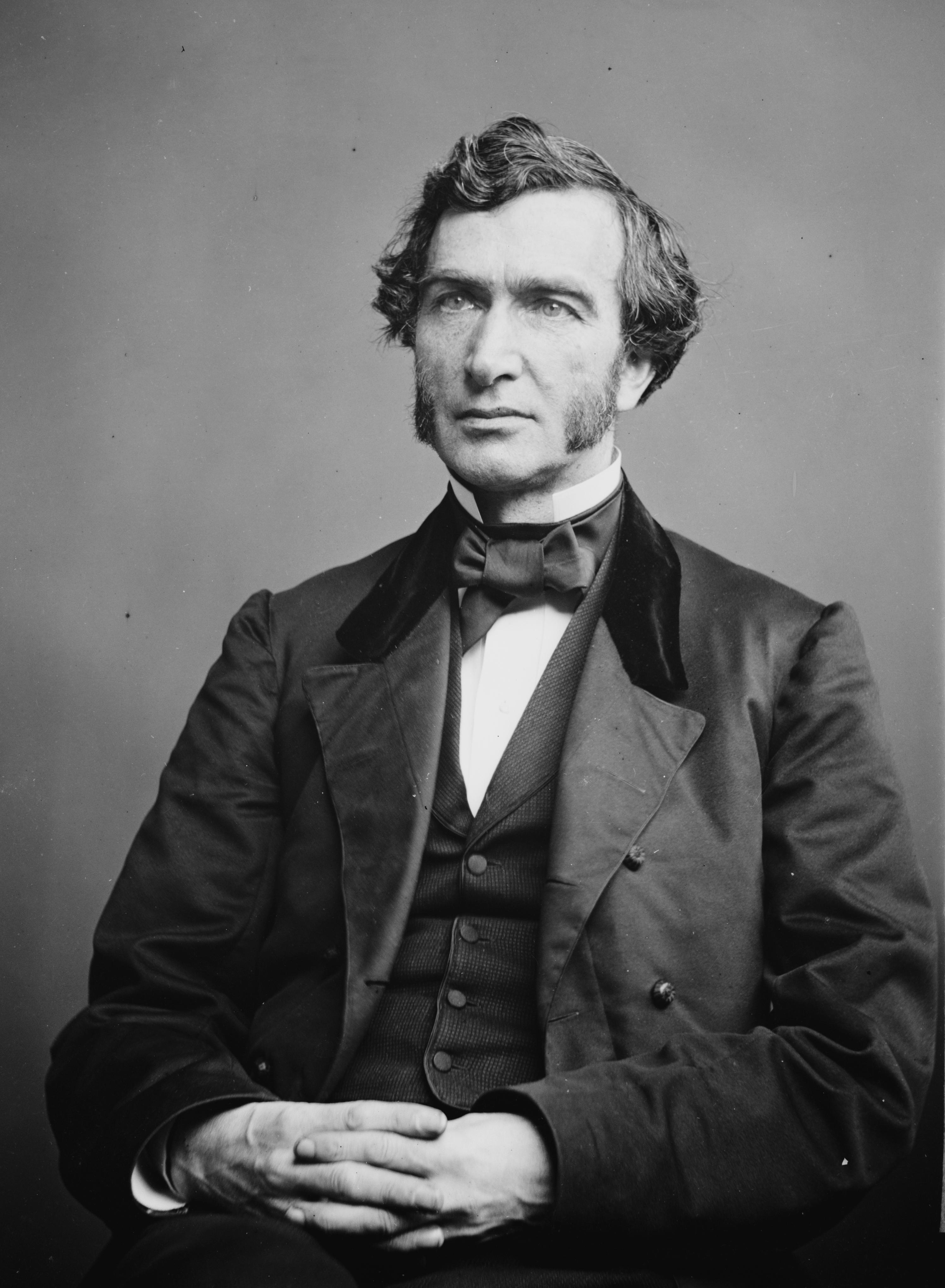
Justin Smith Morrill

The Michigan Constitution of 1850 called for the creation of an "agricultural school", though it was not until February 12, 1855, that Michigan governor Kinsley S. Bingham signed a bill establishing the United States' first agriculture college, the Agricultural College of the State of Michigan, known today as Michigan State University, which served as a model for the Morrill Act.

On February 8, 1853, the Illinois Legislature adopted a resolution, drafted by Turner, calling for the Illinois congressional delegation to work to enact a land-grant bill to fund a system of industrial colleges, one in each state. Senator Lyman Trumbull of Illinois believed it was advisable that the bill should be introduced by an eastern congressman, and two months later Representative Justin Smith Morrill of Vermont introduced his bill.

Unlike the Turner Plan, which provided an equal grant to each state, the Morrill bill allocated land based on the number of senators and representatives each state had in Congress. This was more advantageous to the more populous eastern states.

The Morrill Act was first proposed in 1857, and was passed by Congress in 1859, but it was vetoed by President James Buchanan.

=== The Morrill Act of 1862 ===
Morrill and his Republican allies saw a new opportunity to pass an agricultural college bill. The secession of Southern states meant there would be far less opposition. In 1861, Morrill resubmitted the act with the amendment that the proposed institutions would teach military tactics as well as engineering and agriculture. The reconfigured Morrill Act was signed into law by President Abraham Lincoln on July 2, 1862. The 1862 act provided each state land scrip for 30,000 acres (120 km^{2}) of public land for each of its representatives and senators in Congress. Sale of this scrip funded the beginning of land-grant colleges. The act stipulated these funds be used for the

endowment, support, and maintenance of at least one college where the leading object shall be, without excluding other scientific and classical studies, and including military tactics, to teach such branches of learning as are related to agriculture and the mechanic arts, in such manner as the legislatures of the States may respectively prescribe, in order to promote the liberal and practical education of the industrial classes in the several pursuits and professions in life.

Under provision six of the Act, "No State while in a condition of rebellion or insurrection against the government of the United States shall be entitled to the benefit of this act," a restriction directed at the eleven total Southern states that had seceded during the American Civil War. Upon reentry into the Union, states received their land scrip for an agricultural college.

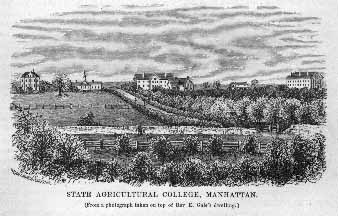
Kansas State University campus, 1878

On September 12, 1862, the state of Iowa was the first to accept the terms of the Morrill Act, which provided the funding boost needed for the fledgling State Agricultural College and Model Farm. The first land-grant institution actually created under the Act was Kansas State University, which was established in 1863.

Each state had wide discretion on how to use its funds. Some states added agricultural and mechanic colleges to their already existing flagship university, as with the University of Wisconsin and the University of Georgia. Some states created new state colleges separate from their flagship institutions, as with what would become Mississippi State University or expanded their new agricultural colleges (as with Michigan State University).

Some states did not have a state college of any kind in 1862, and used their land-grant funds to create one, as with the University of Nevada. Once new states were incorporated in the United States, they were able to access land-grant funds (as with the University of Nebraska), and eventually, federal territories started their agricultural colleges before statehood. The latest school created with funds via the 1862 Act was the University of Alaska Fairbanks, founded in 1917.

==== The granted land ====
If the federal land within a state was insufficient to meet that state's land grant, the state was issued scrip, which authorized the state to select federal lands in other states to fund its institution. For example, New York carefully selected valuable timber land in Wisconsin to fund Cornell University. The resulting management of this scrip by the university yielded one third of the total grant revenues generated by all the states, even though New York received only one-tenth of the 1862 land grant. Overall, the 1862 Morrill Act allocated 17,400,000 acres (70,000 km^{2}) of land, which when sold yielded a collective endowment of $7.55 million.

The U.S. government had acquired most of that land via lopsided treaties and violent conflict throughout the 19th century. In total, 162 violence-backed cessions expropriated approximately 10.7 million acres of land from 245 tribal nations and divided it into roughly 80,000 parcels for redistribution.

=== Morrill Act of 1890 ===
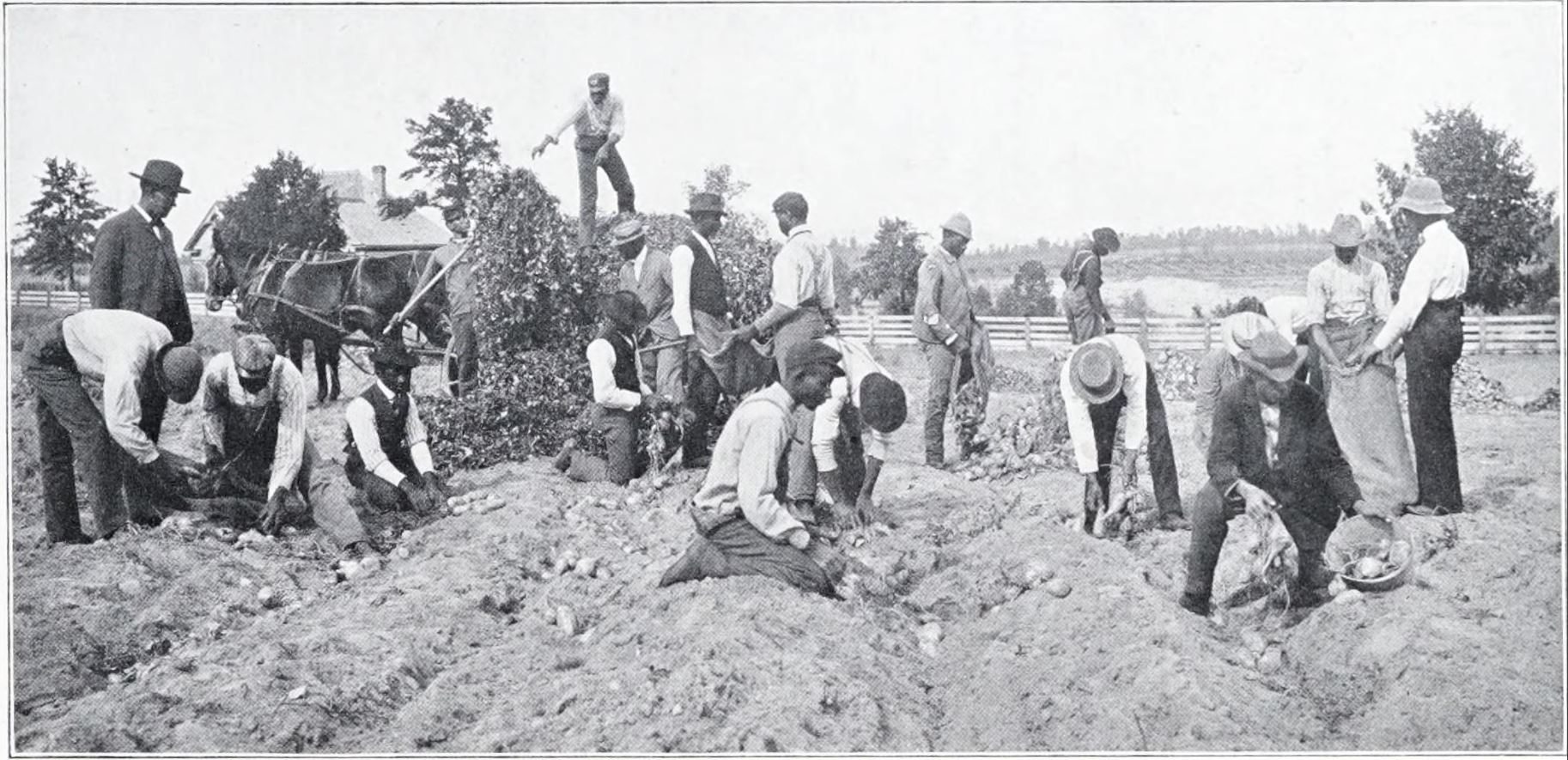
Tuskegee Institute students at work on the school farm

The second Morrill Act was aimed at the former Confederate states. By 1890, efforts to reconstruct the South and create a biracial democracy had failed, and white supremacy was law. Black students were barred from public institutions, including schools.

The 1890 act required each state to show that race was not an admissions criterion, or else to designate a separate land-grant institution for African Americans. Southern states decided on the latter. Thus, the second Morrill Act facilitated segregated education, although it also provided higher educational opportunities for African Americans who otherwise would not have had them. Among the seventy colleges and universities which eventually evolved from the Morrill Acts are several of today's historically Black colleges and universities.

Though the 1890 Act granted cash instead of land, it granted colleges under that act the same legal standing as the 1862 Act colleges; hence the term "land-grant college" properly applies to both groups.

=== Equity in Educational Land-Grant Status Act of 1994 ===
The 1994 expansion added tribal colleges and universities to the land-grant system. Like the 1890 schools, they are not funded via land grants but are considered land-grant schools in accordance with the 1862 Morrill Act. 1994 schools receive Congressional apportionments, are chartered by American Indian nations, and predominantly enroll Native students. There are 35 1994 land-grant schools, as of 2023.

== Related legislation ==
=== Hatch Act of 1887 ===
Starting in 1887, Congress funded agricultural experiment stations and various categories of agricultural and veterinary research "under direction of" the land-grant universities.

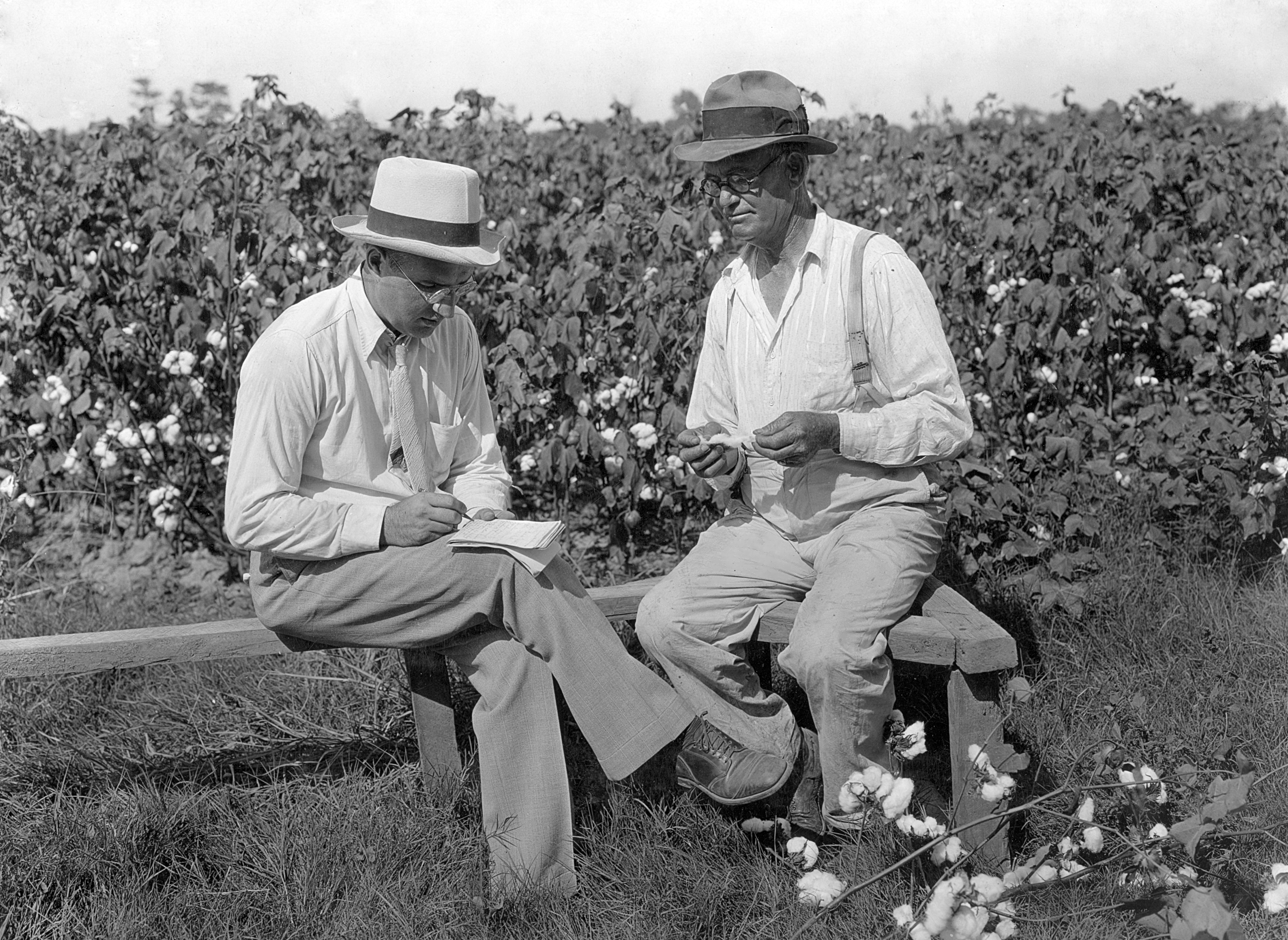
A county extension agent and cotton farmer meet in Pulaski County, Arkansas

Faculty at land-grant schools wanted greater opportunities to experiment and institutionalize knowledge. By the early 1880s, enough states were struggling with the need for institutionalizing agricultural research that sentiment for a concerted national approach was revived. Seaman A. Knapp, a professor at Iowa State College, authored a proposal calling for an agricultural experiment station in each state to be funded out of the national treasury. The concept found favorability in the House agriculture committee then chaired by Rep. William H. Hatch of Missouri. The Hatch Act was signed into law by President Grover Cleveland on March 2, 1887, giving each land-grant college $15,000 annually to support an experiment station.

=== Smith–Lever Act of 1914 ===
Map of most land-grant universities in the United States. including the date of the land grant

Land-grant schools later recognized the need to disseminate the knowledge gained at the land-grant colleges to farmers and homemakers. The Smith–Lever Act of 1914 started federal funding of cooperative extensions, operated by the land-grant school. Agricultural agents were sent to virtually every county of every state to disseminate knowledge and demonstrate techniques to farmers.

== Effects ==
Though the Congressional debates about the Act were largely focused on benefits to agriculture, the land grant colleges transformed engineering education in America and boosted the United States into a position of leadership in technical education. Before the Civil War, American colleges primarily trained students in classical studies and the liberal arts. For the most part, only the relatively affluent could afford higher education, and entrance requirements often required proficiency in the dead languages of Latin and Ancient Greek. The first Bachelor of Science (B.S.) degrees, which typically required no Latin, came into being around 1850.

American engineers were mostly educated at the United States Military Academy in fortress construction, and their instructors were the authors of most engineering texts of the day. Though the Congressional debates about the Act were largely focused on benefits to agriculture, the Act also supported the mechanic arts (meaning applied sciences and engineering). Whereas in 1866 there were around 300 American men who had graduated with engineering degrees and only six reputable colleges granting them, just four years later there were 21 colleges offering engineering degrees and the total number of engineers graduated had tripled to 866. The following decade added another 2,249 engineers, and by 1911 the United States was graduating 3,000 engineers a year, with a total of 38,000 in the work force. At the time, Germany was graduating 1,800 engineers per year. The US had become the leader in technical education just 50 years after passage of the Morrill Act.

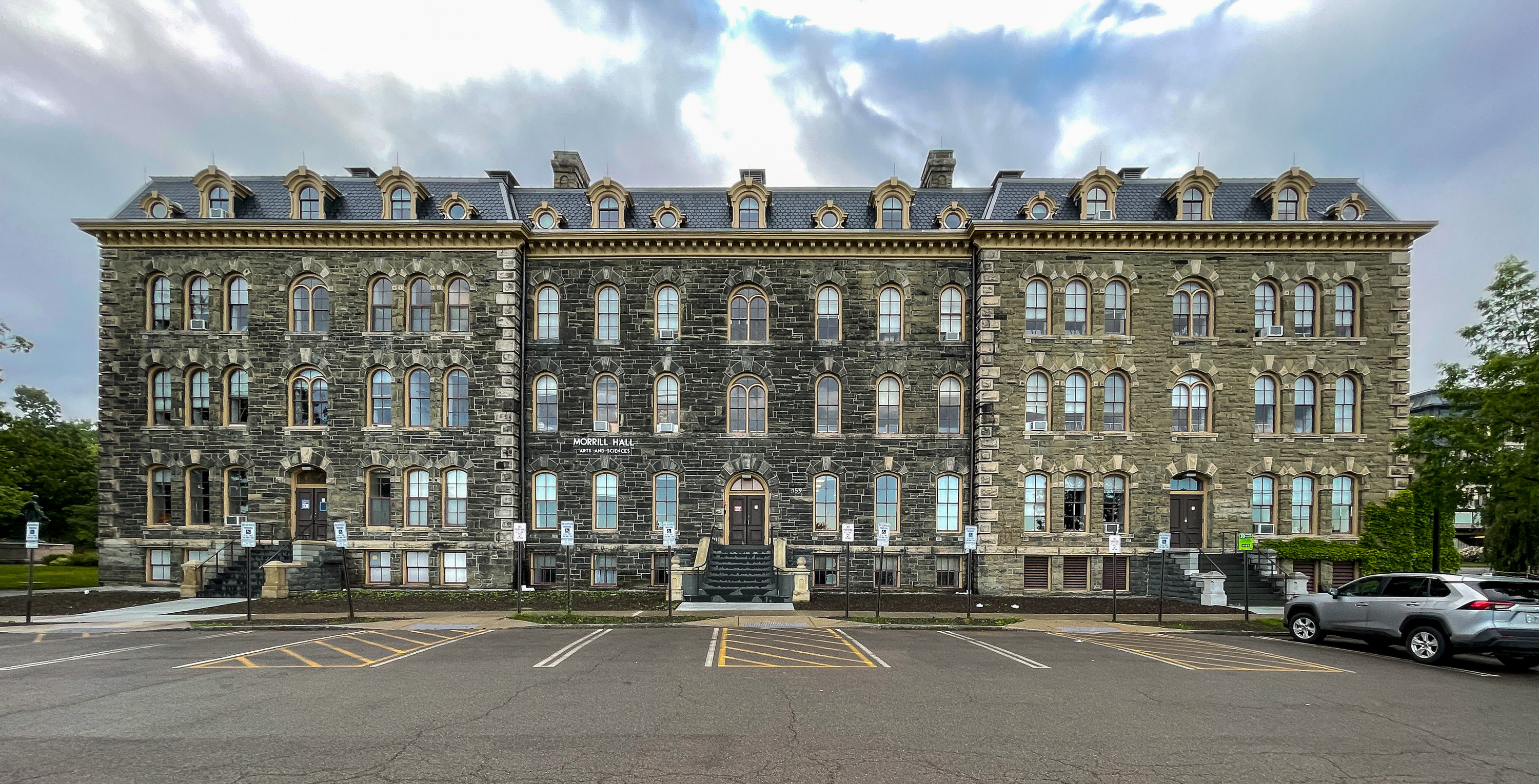
Morrill Hall, the first building of Cornell University, is named for Senator Justin Morrill.

In imitation of the land-grant colleges' focus on agricultural and mechanical research, Congress later established programs of sea grant colleges (aquatic research, in 1966), urban grant colleges (urban research, in 1985), space grant colleges (space research, in 1988), and sun grant colleges (sustainable energy research, in 2003).

In the fiscal year 2006 USDA budget, $1.033 billion went to research and cooperative extension activities nationwide. For this purpose, then-President George W. Bush proposed a $1.035 billion appropriation for fiscal year 2008.

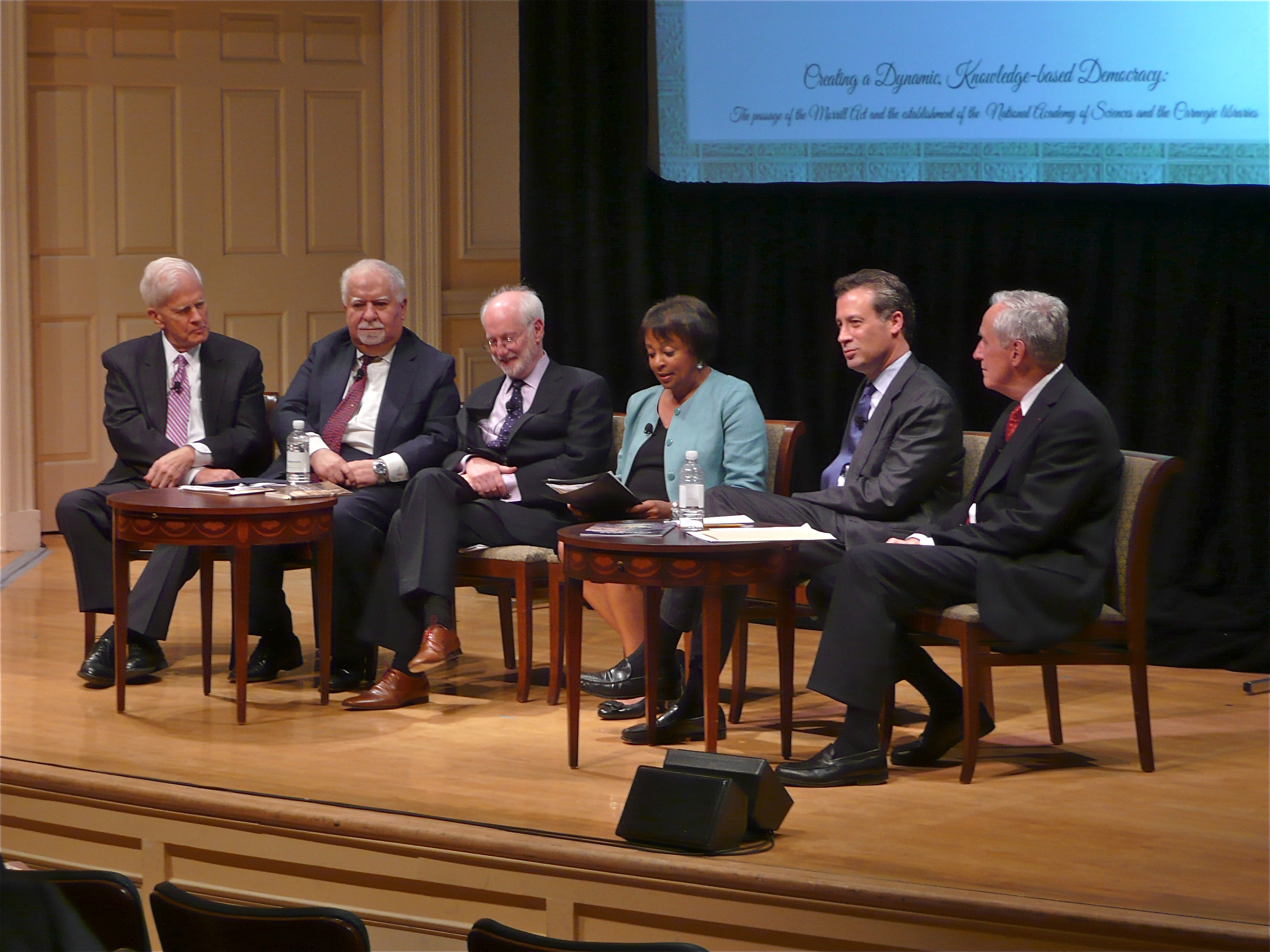
Celebration of the 150th anniversary of the Morrill Act, at the Library of Congress, June 23, 2012

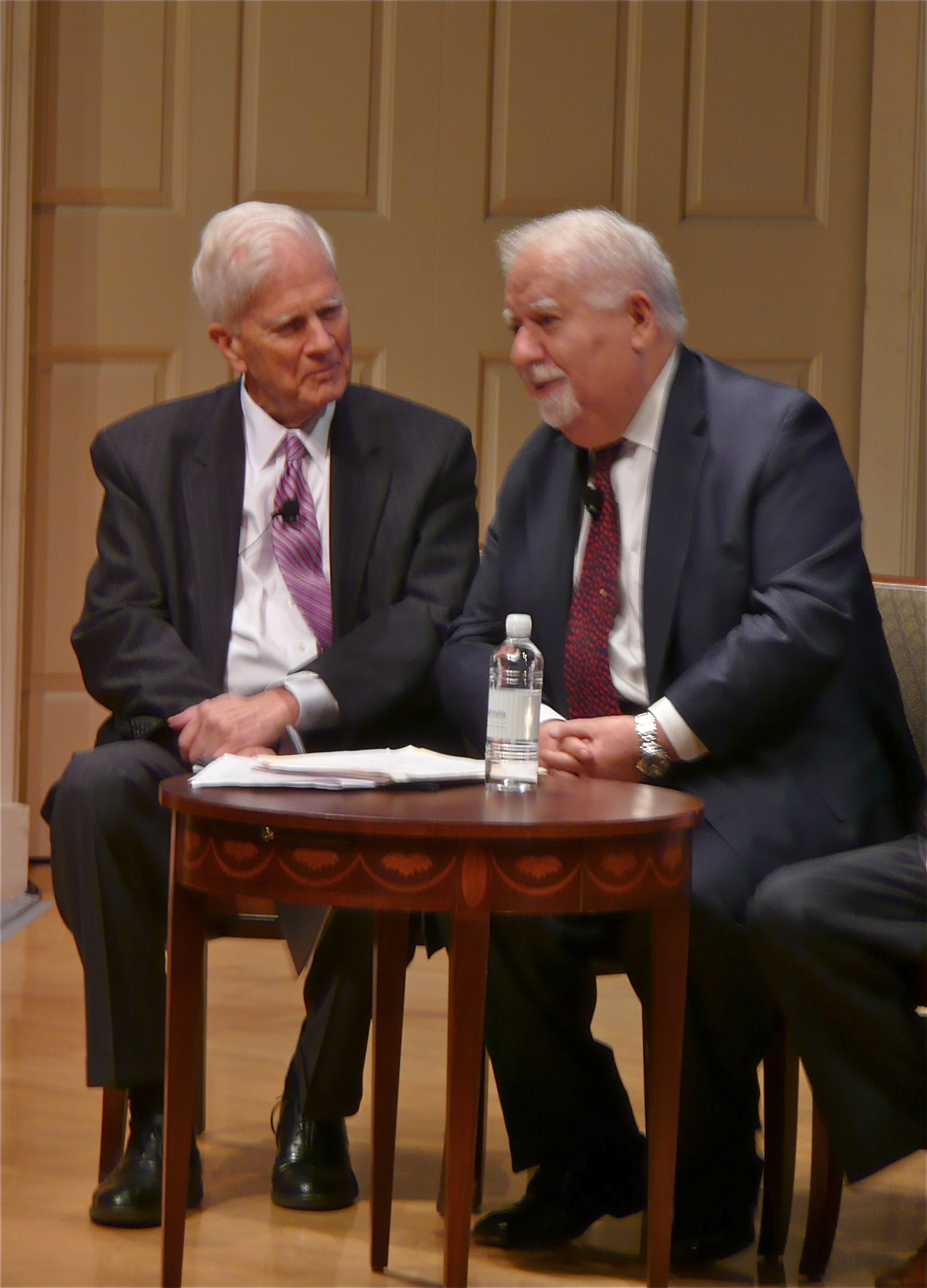
James H. Billington and Vartan Gregorian at the Celebration of the 150th anniversary of the Morrill Act, 2012

== See also ==
- Agricultural Experiment Stations Act of 1887
- Association of Public and Land-grant Universities
- Hatch Act of 1887
- Land-grant university
- List of land-grant universities
- Manual labor college
- Smith–Lever Act of 1914
- United States Department of Agriculture
