= H.R. 9495 =

H.R. 9495 may refer to:

- The Capper–Ketcham Act, introduced in the U.S. House of Representatives as H.R. 9495
- The Stop Terror-Financing and Tax Penalties on American Hostages Act, a proposed bill introduced in 2024
