= List of land-grant universities =

This is a list of land-grant colleges and universities in the United States and its associated territories.

Land-grant institutions are often categorized as 1862, 1890, and 1994 institutions, based on the date of the legislation that designated most of them with land-grant status.

Of the 106 land-grant institutions, all but two (the Community College of Micronesia and Northern Marianas College) are members of the Association of Public and Land-grant Universities (formerly the National Association of State Universities and Land-Grant Colleges).

Note: Historically black colleges or universities on this list are listed in italics.

== Native American ==
The 31 tribal colleges of 1994 are represented as a system by the single membership of the American Indian Higher Education Consortium (AIHEC).

The AIHEC has its headquarters in Alexandria, Virginia for the benefits of ready access to the federal government in Washington, D.C. None of its member schools are located in Virginia. They are located from Michigan westward to Arizona, California and Alaska.

== By state ==
=== Alabama ===
- Alabama A&M University
- Auburn University (designated as a land-grant college in 1872 under the name Agricultural and Mechanical College of Alabama)
- Tuskegee University (private)

Though Alabama A&M is Alabama's official 1890 Morrill Act institution, the mission and unique history of Tuskegee are so similar to those of the 1890 institutions that it functions as a de facto land-grant university and is almost universally regarded as one of them. Tuskegee is a land-grant member of APLU, as are Alabama A&M and Auburn. However, only Alabama A&M and Auburn formally participate in the now-combined Alabama Cooperative Extension System, with Tuskegee listed as a "cooperating partner" in ACES. Tuskegee has also received Smith-Lever Act funds since 1972 to operate its own Cooperative Extension program. Tuskegee is also explicitly granted the same status as the 1890 land-grant institutions in a number of Federal laws.

=== Alaska ===
- University of Alaska Fairbanks

=== Arizona ===
- Diné College
- Navajo Technical University, Chinle
- Tohono O'odham Community College, Sells
- University of Arizona, Tucson

=== Arkansas ===
- University of Arkansas (Fayetteville) (designated in 1871; opened in 1872)
- University of Arkansas at Pine Bluff (formerly Arkansas Agricultural, Mechanical and Normal)

=== California ===
- University of California (designated in 1866; University of California, Berkeley opened in 1868)

=== Colorado ===
- Colorado State University

=== Connecticut ===
- University of Connecticut

Originally, in 1863, the Sheffield Scientific School, part of Yale University, was designated as the state's land-grant college. Despite the fact that Yale's agricultural efforts and education were lauded by state officials and others (with 50 to 60 students graduating annually from its tuition-free agricultural program within the "Sheff"), the Connecticut State Grange felt farmers were not receiving the full benefits of the Morrill Act due to Yale's high admissions standards; thus, in 1893, they persuaded the Connecticut General Assembly to establish Storrs Agricultural College (now called the University of Connecticut) and make it the state's sole land-grant institution (thereby removing Yale University's designation). In compensation, the General Assembly awarded Yale University $155,000.

=== Delaware ===
- Delaware State University (original name was State College for Colored Students)
- University of Delaware (designated on March 14, 1867; reopened in 1870)

=== Florida ===
- Florida A&M University (after the second Morrill Act the name of this institution was State Normal and Industrial College for Colored Students)
- University of Florida

=== Georgia ===
- Fort Valley State University
- University of Georgia
  - A portion of the University of Georgia's funds were used to establish a branch in Dahlonega, Georgia that became North Georgia Agricultural College, then North Georgia College, then North Georgia College and State University, which in turn was merged into the current University of North Georgia in 2013.

=== Hawaii ===
- University of Hawaiʻi

=== Idaho ===
- University of Idaho (designated in 1889; opened in 1892)

=== Illinois ===
- University of Illinois (designated on February 28, 1867; opened in 1868)

=== Indiana ===
- Purdue University (designated in 1869)

Indiana accepted the provisions of the Morrill Act on March 6, 1865.

=== Iowa ===
- Iowa State University (designated on March 29, 1864)

On September 11, 1862, Iowa became the first state in the nation to accept the provisions of the Morrill Act.

=== Kansas ===
- Haskell Indian Nations University
- Kansas State University (designated on February 16, 1863 but was not opened until September 2, 1863)

=== Kentucky ===
- Kentucky State University (designated in the Land Grant Act of 1890)
- University of Kentucky (designated in February 1865)

=== Louisiana ===
- Louisiana State University
- Southern University and A&M College

=== Maine ===
- University of Maine (designated on February 25, 1865; opened in 1868)

=== Maryland ===
- University of Maryland, College Park (designated on March 21, 1865)
- University of Maryland Eastern Shore

The State of Maryland, in operating its land-grant program at the Maryland Agricultural College at College Park, which did not admit African American students, sought to provide a land-grant program for African Americans. In 1919 the state of Maryland assumed control of the Delaware Conference Academy (of the Delaware Conference of the Methodist Episcopal Church) and changed its name to Eastern Shore Branch of the Maryland Agricultural College.

=== Massachusetts ===
- Massachusetts Institute of Technology (private)
- University of Massachusetts Amherst

=== Michigan ===
- Michigan State University (designated on March 18, 1863)

Founded in 1855 by the State of Michigan, and known as the "Agricultural College of the State of Michigan" with its own state grants of land, the Michigan State model provided a precedent for the federal Morrill Act of 1862. In 1955, Michigan State University and Pennsylvania State University were included on a US postage stamp commemorating MSU and PSU as the "First of the Land Grant Colleges."

=== Minnesota ===
- Fond du Lac Tribal and Community College
- Leech Lake Tribal College
- Red Lake Nation College (designated a 1994 Land Grant College in the 2008 Farm Bill)
- University of Minnesota
- White Earth Tribal and Community College

The 1862 land grant was originally provided in 1865 to a fledgling state agricultural college in Glencoe, Minnesota, but was re-appropriated to the University of Minnesota by an act of the Legislature on February 18, 1868.

=== Mississippi ===
- Alcorn State University
- Mississippi State University

The State of Mississippi granted Alcorn three-fifths of the proceeds earned from the sale of thirty thousand acres of land scrip for agricultural colleges. From its beginning, it was a land grant college, and the money from the sale of the land scrip of the Morrill Act was used solely for the agricultural and mechanical components of this college.

=== Missouri ===
- Lincoln University
- University of Missouri (designated in 1870)

Founded in 1866 as the Lincoln Institute by members of the 62nd and 65th United States Colored Infantry, under the Morrill Act of 1890, Lincoln was designated by Missouri as a land-grant university for black students. It integrated in 1956.

=== Montana ===
- Montana State University (Bozeman), so designated upon its founding in 1893 as the Agricultural College of the State of Montana

=== Nebraska ===
- University of Nebraska–Lincoln

=== Nevada ===
- University of Nevada, Las Vegas
- University of Nevada, Reno

The University of Nevada, Las Vegas, is technically considered a land-grant university according to the attorney-general of Nevada, but has received minuscule land-grant benefits as compared to the University of Nevada, Reno (UNR), and does not have an agricultural program. However, former Governor Brian Sandoval, a UNR graduate and the current president of UNR, opposes that interpretation and views UNR as the sole land grant institution in the state.

=== New Hampshire ===
- University of New Hampshire

=== New Jersey ===
- Rutgers, The State University of New Jersey (designated on April 4, 1864)

=== New Mexico ===
- New Mexico State University

=== New York ===
- Cornell University (designated on April 27, 1865)

Cornell is a private university with four statutory colleges, supported by the State of New York; however, all of its colleges help to fulfill its land-grant mission. The original land-grant designee was the People's College in Havana, New York, from 1863 to 1865.

=== North Carolina ===
- North Carolina A&T State University (founded in 1891 as The Agricultural and Mechanical College for the Colored Race)
- North Carolina State University

North Carolina State University (NCSU) was founded after citizens criticized the misuse of federal land-grant resources by the University of North Carolina (UNC).

=== North Dakota ===
- North Dakota State University
- Nueta Hidatsa Sahnish College (designated in 1994 with 31 other tribal colleges)

=== Ohio ===
- Central State University
- Ohio State University

Central State University was given status as an 1890 land-grant institution in 2014. Unlike the other states with historically black land-grant colleges, Ohio did not segregate its public universities, and African-American students have been admitted to Ohio State University since 1889.

=== Oklahoma ===
- Langston University
- Oklahoma State University

Founded in 1897 as the Oklahoma Colored Agricultural and Normal University, Langston University was created as a result of the second Morrill Act in 1890.

=== Oregon ===
- Oregon State University (designated October 27, 1868)

=== Pennsylvania ===
- Pennsylvania State University (designated in April 1863)

=== Rhode Island ===
- University of Rhode Island

Originally, in January 1863, Brown University was designated as the state's land-grant college. Soon though, in the state's opinion, Brown University provided inadequate agricultural education, in part due to the fact that it could not afford to hire a specific professor or faculty of agricultural sciences, and in part due to the fact that Rhode Island's method for allocating land-grant scholarships favored urbanites and effectively produced few to no farmers. The curator of the university's museum of natural history had been reluctantly recruited to give series of lectures on agricultural topics, which included visits to local farms. When the Hatch Act of 1887 supporting agricultural experiment stations was passed, the Grange had made sure it was stated therein that funds did not need to be applied to current colleges and could be used for agricultural experiment stations not connected with them, so the Rhode Island General Assembly, having grown disenchanted with Brown's lackluster performance, established an agricultural school at Kingston and applied the Hatch Act's funds to it. Eventually, in 1890, Brown felt it drew no benefit from being the state's land-grant university, so it offered to return the Morrill trust to the state and withdraw as the land-grant institution. Shortly thereafter, Congress passed the second Morrill Act to increase funding to land-grant universities, and, following a controversy as to which school should benefit being decided in Brown's favor by the Rhode Island Supreme Court, Brown promptly withdrew its offer. On May 19, 1892, after growing increasingly displeased with Brown's agricultural program, the Rhode Island General Assembly decided to restructure the Kingston school as the Rhode Island College for the Agricultural and Mechanical Arts (now called the University of Rhode Island) and to designate it as the state's only land-grant institution, thereby removing Brown from that status. Brown University protested by suing the state and the case was heard by the US District Court for Rhode Island. This court decided against Brown, which then appealed to the US Supreme Court. When the Supreme Court refused to hear the case, Brown conceded defeat such that, in 1894, the state, as related by Encyclopedia Brunoniana, "approved an agreement in which Brown would repay the $50,000 received from the sale of the land in Kansas and assume the expense of educating the present holders of the state scholarships, and in return [Brown] would receive $40,000 in compensation for the education of earlier state scholars and would be relieved of the responsibility for agricultural education assumed in connection with the Morrill Act of 1863."

=== South Carolina ===
- Clemson University
- South Carolina State University

Founded in 1896 as the Colored Normal, Industrial, Agricultural and Mechanical College of South Carolina, South Carolina State University still has the 1890 land-grant legacy of service to the citizenry of the state.

=== South Dakota ===
- South Dakota State University

=== Tennessee ===
- Tennessee State University
- University of Tennessee

TSU is the only state-funded historically black university in Tennessee. It was founded in 1909 as the Agricultural and Industrial State Normal School and became the Agricultural and Industrial State Normal College two years later.

=== Texas ===
- Prairie View A&M University
- Texas A&M University

Founded in 1876, Prairie View is the second oldest state-sponsored institution of higher education in Texas (after Texas A&M University). Consistent with terms of the federal Morrill Land-Grant Colleges Act, which provided public lands for the establishment of colleges, the State of Texas authorized an "Agricultural and Mechanical College for the Benefit of Colored Youth" as part of the Agricultural and Mechanical College of Texas (now Texas A&M University) System.

=== Utah ===
- Utah State University

=== Vermont ===
- University of Vermont

=== Virginia ===
- Virginia Polytechnic Institute and State University (Virginia Tech)
- Virginia State University

Virginia State University was founded in 1882 as the Virginia Normal and Collegiate Institute. In 1902, the legislature revised the school's charter and renamed it the "Virginia Normal and Industrial Institute". In 1923, this college was renamed "Virginia State College for Negroes". It was designated one of Virginia's land grant colleges in response to the Amendments to the Morrill Act in 1890, which required that the states either open their land-grant colleges to all races, or else establish separate land-grant schools for African-Americans.

=== Washington ===
- Washington State University

=== West Virginia ===
- West Virginia State University (established as the West Virginia Colored Institute in 1891)
- West Virginia University (designated on February 7, 1867)

After the desegregation of West Virginia schools in the 1950s, the state board of education voted to terminate West Virginia State University's land-grant funding structure. West Virginia State University was restored to land-grant status in 2001.

=== Wisconsin ===
- University of Wisconsin–Madison (designated on April 12, 1866)

=== Wyoming ===
- University of Wyoming

== Associated territories ==
=== American Samoa ===
- American Samoa Community College

=== District of Columbia ===
- University of the District of Columbia

=== Guam ===
- University of Guam

=== Northern Marianas ===
- Northern Marianas College

=== Puerto Rico ===
- University of Puerto Rico at Mayagüez

=== Virgin Islands ===
- University of the Virgin Islands

== See also ==
- List of agricultural universities and colleges
