= Hatch Act (disambiguation) =

The Hatch Act (1939) is U.S. federal legislation prohibiting some political activities for employees in the executive branch.

Hatch Act may also refer to:

- Hatch Act of 1887, U.S. federal legislation that created agricultural experiment stations

== See also ==
- Pendleton Civil Service Reform Act (1883), established that positions within the federal government should be awarded on the basis of merit
