= Jonathan Baldwin Turner =

American academic (1805–1899)

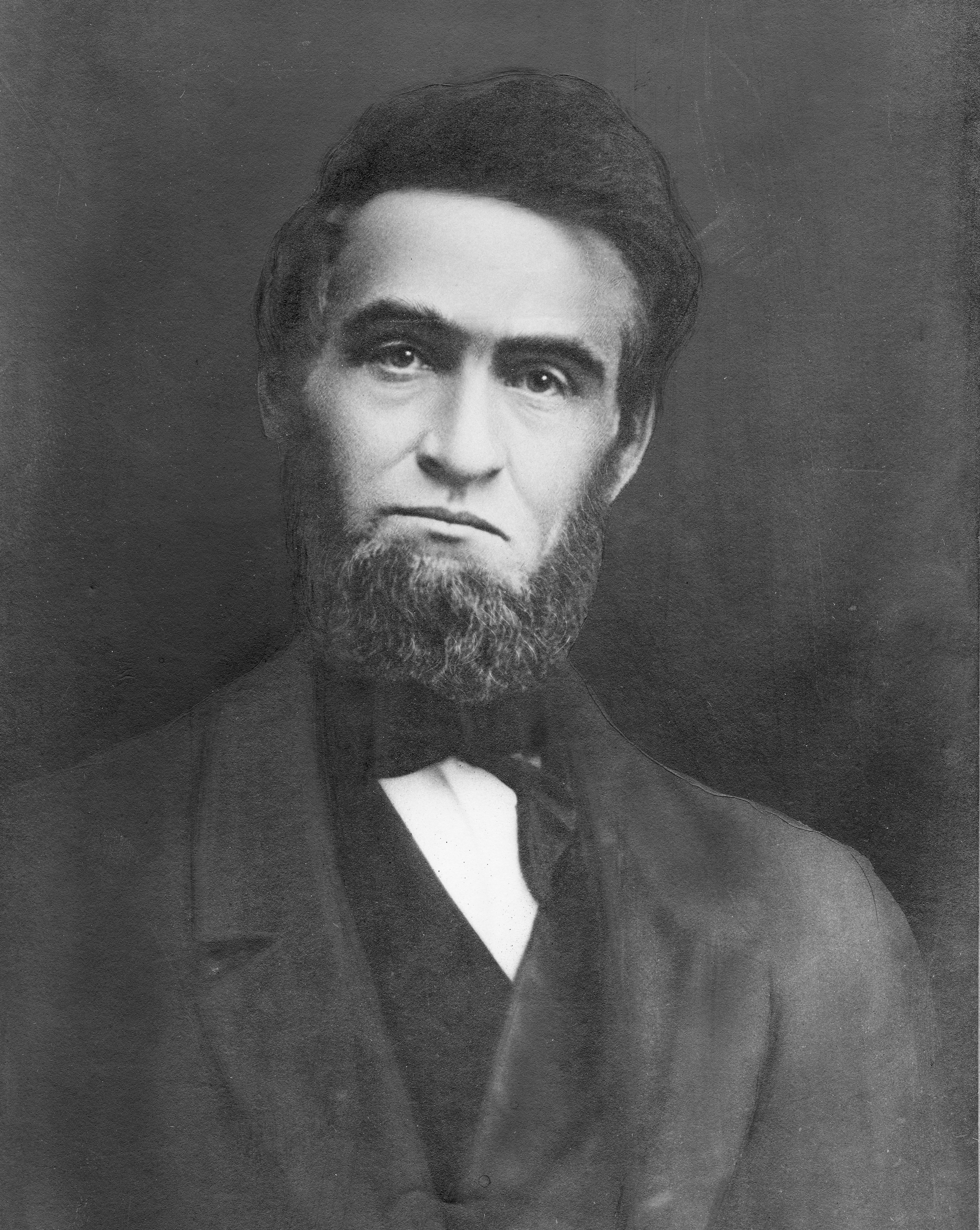
- Turner in the 1860s
- Born: December 7, 1805; Templeton, Massachusetts
- Died: January 10, 1899 (aged 93); Jacksonville, Illinois
- Occupation: Professor
- Known for: Land grant universities
- Notable work: "A Plan for an Industrial University"

Jonathan Baldwin Turner (December 7, 1805 – January 10, 1899) was an American classical scholar, agriculturalist, and abolitionist. He also led a political movement to create agriculture colleges, and campaigned to institute land grant universities. He established the use of the thorny "hedge apple" planted to form a barrier for animals in North America. In 1835, Turner married Rhodolphia Kibbe and they had seven children.

Turner was the author of "A Plan for an Industrial University" for the state of Illinois's Farmer's Convention at Granville in 1851. He had laid out a plan for a national grant to provide an industrial and mechanical college for each US state. Vermont Representative Justin Morrill introduced a similar plan which became law as the Morrill Land-Grant Act in 1862.

== Early life ==
Jonathan Baldwin Turner was born December 7, 1805, outside Templeton, Massachusetts; his parents were farmers Asa Turner and Nabby Baldwin. Jonathan was educated in local schools before attending and graduating from then-Yale College, where he studied classical literature at Yale, and excelled in Greek and English composition. Turner was ordained as a minister and graduated in 1833, after which he moved to Illinois to become a professor at the newly organized Illinois College at Jacksonville. He taught subjects across the whole curriculum but specialized in Belles-lettres, Latin, and Greek. Students of Turner, the Green brothers, brought him in contact with Abraham Lincoln, who was helping with the harvest on the Green Family farm. Lincoln had heard of Turner's teaching and became interested in it.

== Educational activism ==
Jonathan Baldwin Turner's views in favor of the abolition of slavery were a subject of growing controversy. In 1848, he resigned from his teaching post as chair of Belles-lettres, Greek, and literature at Illinois College. He created the Illinois Industrial League to advocate for a publicly funded system to provide "industrial" education that suited the needs of the working ("industrial") classes.

Turner continued to advocate for his model of education. A similar plan Justin Morrill introduced became law as the Morrill Land-Grant Act in 1862. Turner was displeased with the political process that located the Illinois Industrial University in Urbana, Illinois. Turner spoke at university's cornerstone-laying event, saying: "Industrial education prepares the way for a millennium of labor", words that were carved in stone and placed above the university's main quadrangle.

== Agricultural research ==
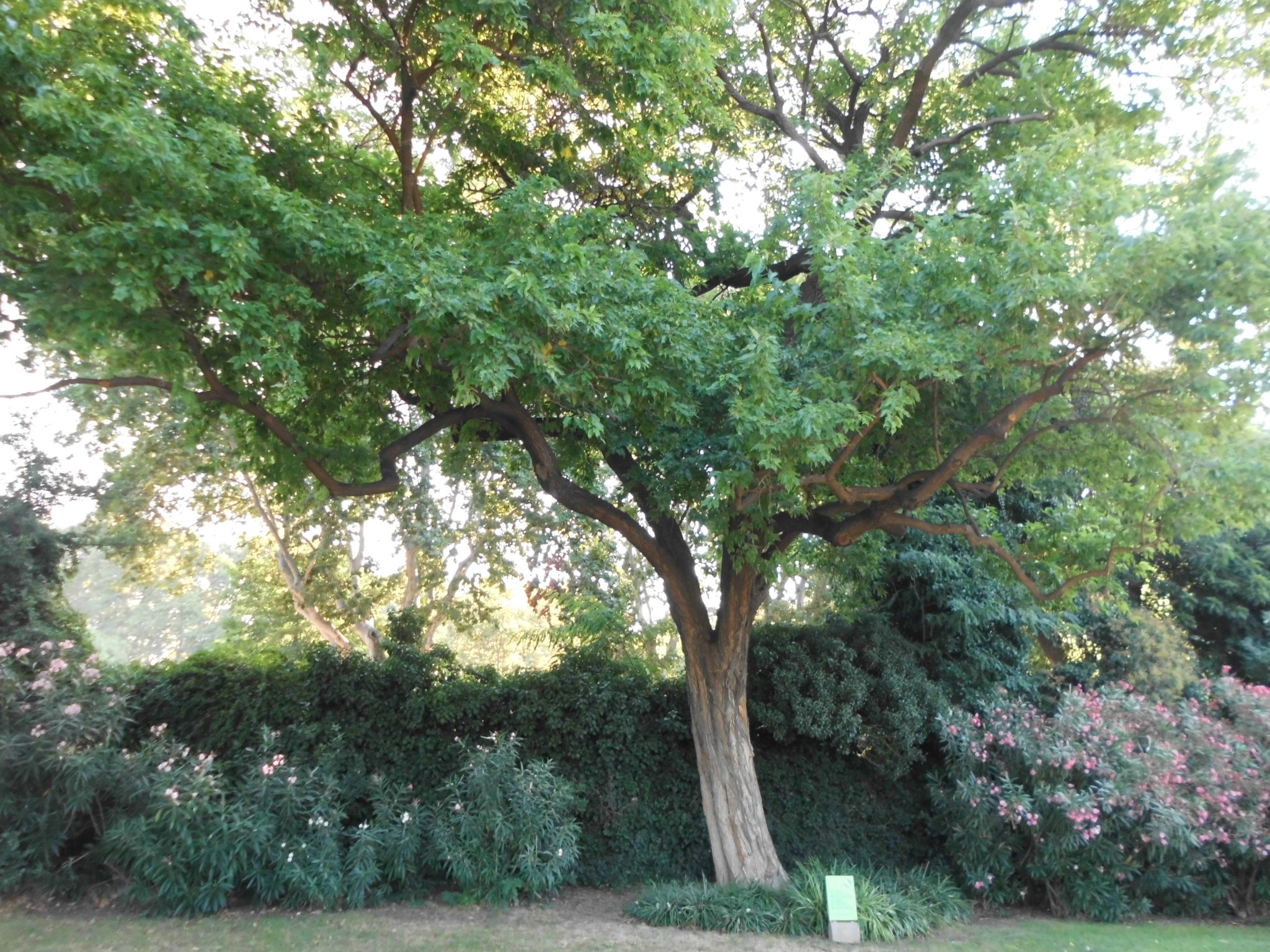
An Osage orange tree

Jonathan Baldwin Turner was an agriculturist; he improved agriculture and established the use of the "hedge apple" or thorny Osage orange tree (Maclura pomifera), a variety of which he developed. At this time, there were very few trees on the prairies to set up split rail fences. While working as a professor at Illinois College, Turner began searching for a plant to use as a hedge to divide, cultivate the expanse of the prairie, and contain livestock. He was inspired by hedgerows in England, and procured seeds from Texas with which to experiment on his farm in Butler, Illinois.

In the late 1830s, Turner selected the Osage orange tree as an ideal plant for this purpose, and patented a machine for preparing the soil and planting the tree's seeds. Turner then advertised and sold Osage orange seeds, which were widely used as hedges before the development of barbed wire between 1867 and 1874. After barbed wire was introduced, farmers still used their Osage orange trees as fence posts, connecting the barbed wire directly to the tree trunks. The wood from this tree is strong, decay resistant, and long-lasting.

== Abolitionist activism and the Underground Railroad ==
Jonathan Baldwin Turner became the editor of a Jacksonville abolitionist newspaper, probably during the 1840s; he also became an assistant with the Underground Railroad and a vocal opponent of slavery. Turner and his wife hid three black slaves for two weeks. His life was frequently threatened due to his abolitionist beliefs. Turner believed the only way to fight slavery was with writing, speech, and the law.

== Later years ==
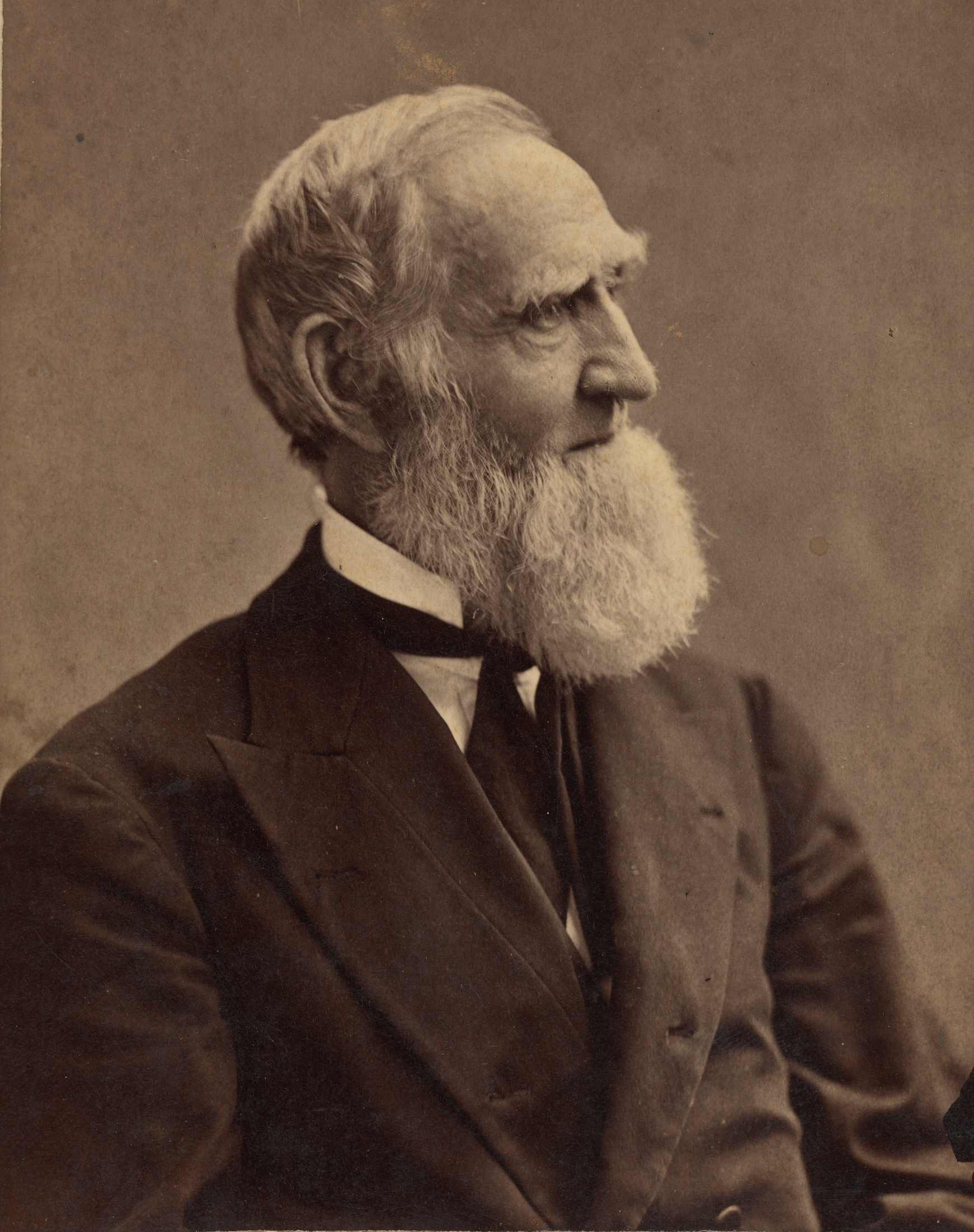
Turner as an older man

After the passing of the Morrill Land-Grant Act, Jonathan Baldwin Turner opposed the power of corporations, which he described as a conflict between the "natural" and "artificial man". In addition, Turner was a trustee for the mentally ill in Illinois' hospitals.

As an ordained minister, Turner was affiliated early on with two Congregational churches but his beliefs became increasingly unorthodox. He wrote religious tracts championing the liberal teachings of Christ while criticizing Catholicism, Mormonism, and the Presbyterian administration of Illinois College, where he was a professor. Turner believed Christ's Creed is broad enough to save all of humanity; he wrote three books on Christ and about his views on Mormonism.

== Death and legacy ==
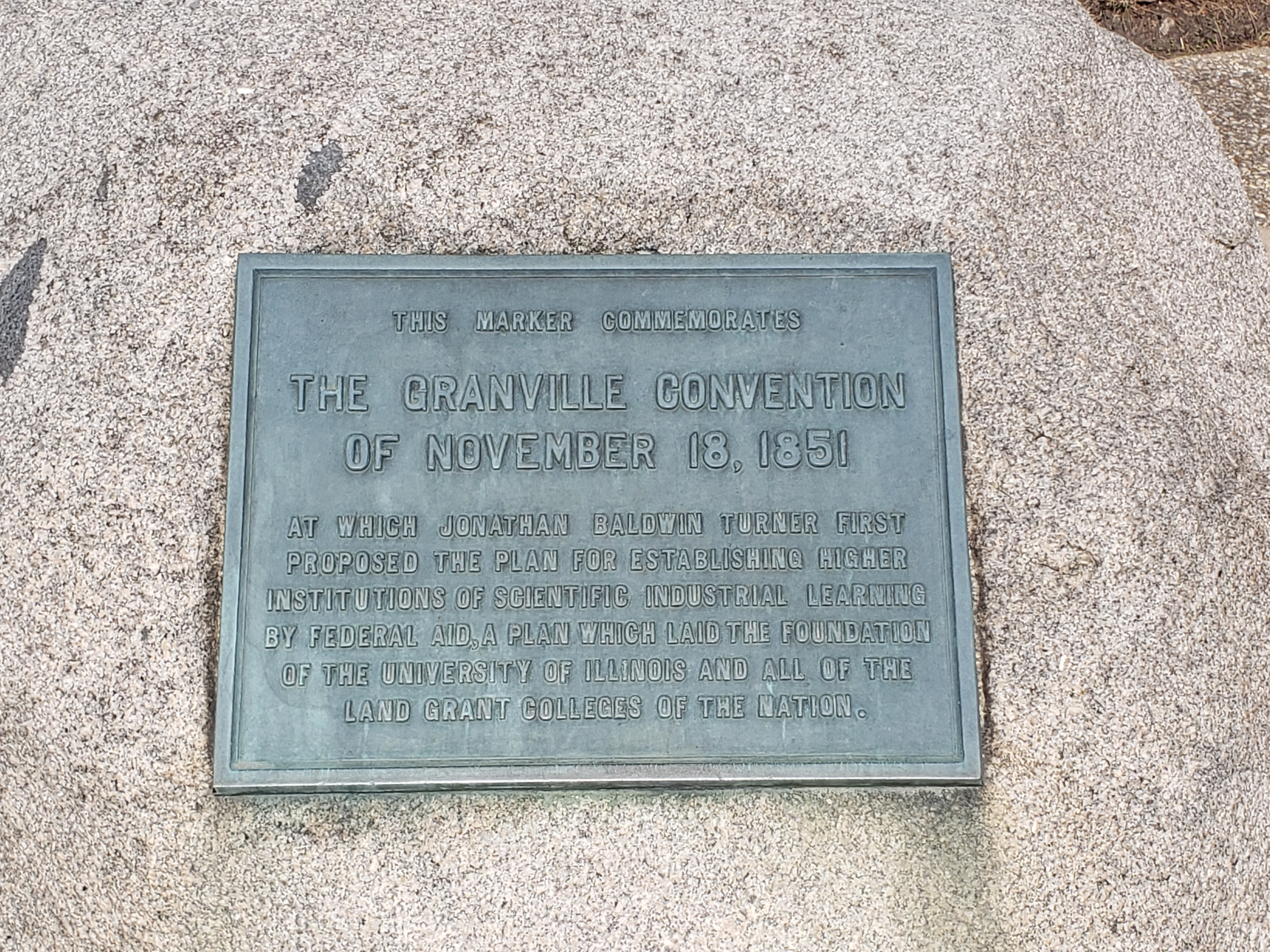
Boulder dedicated to Turner's speech at the Granville Convention proposing land grant colleges. The plaque reads "This marker commemorates the Granville convention of November 18, 1851 at which Jonathan Baldwin Turner first proposed the plan for establishing higher institutions of scientific industrial learning by federal aid, a plan which laid the foundation of the University of Illinois and all the land grant colleges of the nation."

Jonathan Baldwin Turner died on January 10, 1899, in Jacksonville, Illinois, at the age of 93. Tributes and memorials were made in his memory. A statue of Turner was erected at the University of Illinois, and Jonathan Turner Junior High School in Jacksonville was named for him. In 1923, a centuries-old boulder with a bronze plaque was placed in Granville, Illinois, honoring the Granville Convention and Turner. The bronze tablet commemorates the introduction by Turner of the first institutions for scientific industrial higher learning at the Granville convention in 1851.

The Jonathan Baldwin Turner Scholarship at the University of Illinois Urbana-Champaign provides $8,000 to a student over three years of college. The College of Aces (Jonathan Baldwin Turner Fellowships) are for doctorate candidates. Turner's papers are held by the Illinois History and Lincoln Collections of the University of Illinois Library at Urbana-Champaign.
