= The Reflector (Mississippi newspaper) =

Mississippi State University student newspaper

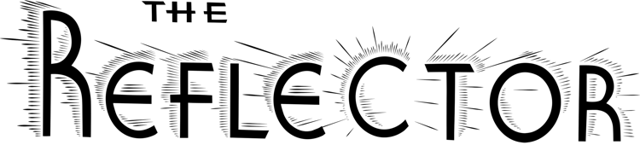
- Type: Student newspaper
- Format: Broadsheet
- Editor-in-chief: Kate Myers
- Founded: 1884
- Headquarters: Henry Meyer Student Media Center, Mississippi State University, Starkville, Miss.
- Circulation: ~12,000
- ISSN: 0893-3286
- OCLC number: 9867061
- Website: reflector-online.com

The Reflector is the editorially independent student-run newspaper of Mississippi State University. It publishes articles in print and online every Wednesday.

The Reflector was established in 1884 as The Dialectic Reflector and its name was changed to The Reflector in 1922. During World War II, from 1944 to 1945, the newspaper was operated and published by faculty under the name Maroon and White. Archives at the Mitchell Memorial Library at MSU hold copies of The Reflector from as far back as the 1880s.

The Reflector remains the oldest college newspaper in the SEC (Southeastern Conference).

== History ==
The newspaper was first published as The Dialectic Reflector between 1884 and 1889 before its name being shortened to The Reflector. It had subsequently published under its current name except for a brief period between 1944 and 1945 when it was operated by faculty and was named Maroon and White during World War II. Following the war, the newspaper resumed publication under its previous name The Reflector. It is the oldest running college newspaper in the SEC.

In 2003, the office complex housing the student publications was renamed to Henry F. Meyer Student Media Center in the honor of former university newspaper advisor Henry F. Meyer.

== Notable alumni ==
- Dustin Barnes, digital strategist for the USA Today Network
- Jim Beaugez, music and culture writer who contributes to Rolling Stone, The New York Times, Smithsonian, Garden & Gun, Guitar World, Oxford American, Outside and CNN
- Elizabeth Crisp Dellenger, politics writer at The Hill; previously Newsweek and The Advocate
- Ross Dellenger, senior college football reporter at Yahoo Sports; former national college football writer for Sports Illustrated
- Ben Mims, author and cooking columnist for the Los Angeles Times; contributor to Food & Wine, Saveur and Buzzfeed's Tasty (web series)
- Craig Peters, senior editor for the Minnesota Vikings
- Ryan Starrett, author of six history books about Mississippi and the South with Josh Foreman, faculty advisor to The Reflector
- Anna Wolfe, investigative reporter at Mississippi Today; 2023 Pulitzer Prize winner in Local Reporting and winner of the 2018 and 2019 Bill Minor Prize for Investigative Journalism

== Website ==
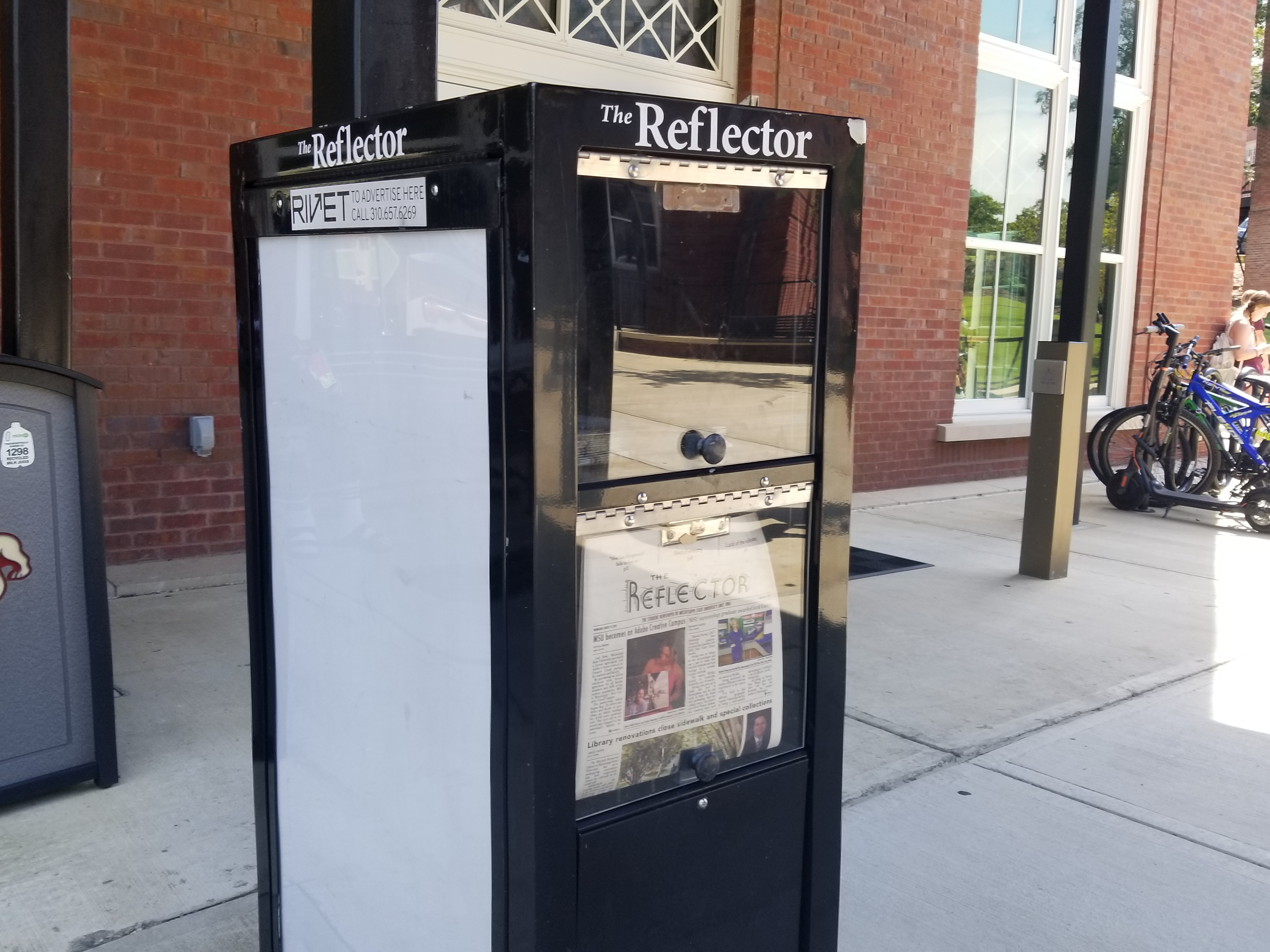
A Newspaper vending machine distributing The Reflector

The Reflector On-Line was created in December 1996. The original web URL was www.reflector.msstate.edu

The Reflector launched their non-edu website on February 2, 2001, swapping to the www.reflector-online.com domain.

While operating, the Reflector website has gathered various awards and honors from statewide, regional and national outlets. It received two national NBS Aehro awards (2020 and 2021) while managed by Brandon Grisham, the former Online editor. It received finalist recognition in 2022 while managed by Joshua Britt.

Grisham's archival work led to the creation of the Digital Issue Collection and the GAP (Grisham Archival Project, created with resources collected through the Mitchell Memorial Library). Both projects offered digital articles and e-editions of older published materials.

The current website offers access to images, online e-editions, news articles, and podcasts.
