= Illinois-Indiana Sea Grant =

US environmental organization

- Illinois-Indiana Sea Grant Logo
- Founded: 1982
- Dissolved: N/A
- Purpose: Healthy coastal ecosystems, sustainable coastal development, safe and sustainable seafood
- Location: West Lafayette, Indiana; Urbana, Illinois; Chicago, Illinois
- Region served: Southern Lake Michigan
- Services: Research funding, education, community outreach
- Director: Stuart Carlton
- Website: iiseagrant.org

Illinois-Indiana Sea Grant provides education, research, and funding to help strengthen and preserve the ecosystems and communities of the southern Lake Michigan region, 104 miles of heavily urbanized and industrialized shoreline in Illinois and Indiana. One third of the population of the Great Lakes lives along the shore of Lake Michigan between Milwaukee, Wisconsin and Michigan City, Indiana, and Lake Michigan is the "largest drinking water supply in the state, serving nearly 6.6 million people (of a total of over 10 million lake-wide)." Illinois-Indiana Sea Grant focuses their efforts in four key areas: Healthy Ecosystems; Sustainable Coasts; Safe, Sustainable Seafood; and Great Lakes Literacy and Workforce Development. Program administration for this organization moved to Purdue University in 2018.

== Background ==
Illinois-Indiana Sea Grant is one of 34 member institutions of the National Oceanic and Atmospheric Association's National Sea Grant College Program. The National Sea Grant College Program fosters "scientific research, education, training, and extension projects geared toward the conservation and practical use of the coasts, Great Lakes, and other marine areas." Illinois-Indiana Sea Grant is a collaboration between the University of Illinois and Purdue University, and focuses on education, research, and outreach efforts in the southern Lake Michigan region - an area of approximately 104 miles of shoreline contained in the two states.

Illinois-Indiana Sea Grant began in April 1982, as a joint venture between extension specialists and faculty at the University of Illinois and Purdue University in Indiana. The proposal that created the program under the National Sea Grant organization emphasized education and public engagement related to Lake Michigan. Over the years, the program has grown to include research and communication elements, with a continued emphasis on educational efforts.

Illinois-Indiana Sea Grant "brings together scientists, educators, policy makers, community decision makers, outreach specialists, business leaders, and the general public to focus on coastal issues in the southern Lake Michigan region." The program supports this mission by funding research, engaging in direct outreach to communities, developing educational materials, offering workshops and training for educators, and engaging in direct research efforts (where applicable) all related to Great Lakes issues. Some of the areas of work include invasive species research and prevention, water use planning, freshwater science education, ecosystem cleanup and remediation, and several other areas.

Illinois-Indiana Sea Grant also produces a regular newsletter, "The Helm," highlighting projects and accomplishments centered on preserving and protecting Lake Michigan's shoreline, communities, water, and wildlife.

== Selected areas of work ==
=== Aquatic invasive species ===
Illinois-Indiana Sea Grant has funded research, produced publications and educational materials, and performed public outreach projects related to monitoring and preventing the spread of aquatic invasive species (AIS) throughout the southern Lake Michigan area.

There are numerous species of both plants and animals that can be considered invasive, but special attention has been paid in recent years to Asian carp, Eurasian watermilfoil, round goby, zebra mussels, and other plants and animals that can have a negative impact on ecology, industry, and public health in and around Lake Michigan.

=== Coastal restoration ===
Illinois-Indiana Sea Grant partners with a number of local, regional, and federal agencies to help restore watersheds, rivers, shorelines, and other areas that have been identified by the U.S. EPA as contaminated or in need of restoration.

The Great Lakes Legacy Act "provides funding to take the necessary steps to clean up contaminated sediment in 'Areas of Concern located wholly or partially in the United States,' including specific funding designated for public outreach and research components." Illinois-Indiana Sea Grant has been involved in holding events to inform local communities about these projects, seek their input on potential impacts to their area, and keep them aware of the schedule and progress being made as well as the benefits. Illinois-Indiana Sea Grant has also produced publications, videos, and other media that help communicate the goals and accomplishments of such remediation projects.

=== Water contamination ===
Another area of primary concern is the contamination of Lake Michigan (the main source of freshwater for over 40 million people in dozens of communities) by common household chemicals, medications, personal care products, lawn care chemicals, and more.

Illinois-Indiana Sea Grant has helped several communities establish medicine collection events and permanent medicine disposal locations to prevent prescription and over-the-counter medications from entering local water supplies and impacting local and regional ecosystems. Previous advice on disposing of these substances had recommended flushing them, but recent research has found that they persist in water supplies and can enter the environment. Partnering with the DEA and U.S. EPA has allowed communities to collect these substances, especially "controlled substances," which have specific requirements about their transfer and disposal. In addition, IISG's website "How to Dispose of Unwanted Medicine & Personal Care Products" provides information for communities and the public on proper disposal methods, events and drop-off locations, and how to start a collection event in their own area.

Similarly, both ground and surface water can be contaminated by common lawn care products due to run-off or excessive application. For instance, in most areas near southern Lake Michigan, lawns often do not require additional nitrogen, but many fertilizers contain the substance. The excess can enter various water supplies where it can lead to excessive algal blooms or water contamination. This has prompted the creation of IISG's Lawn to Lake program, designed to promote "healthy lawn and landscape practices to protect water resources in the Great Lakes region."

=== Water supply use/planning ===
Urban and suburban growth requires a larger and sustainable supply of clean water. While Lake Michigan would appear to be an abundant resource, lower rainfall and population increases are considerations in planning for both the present and future needs served by this freshwater supply.

Illinois-Indiana Sea Grant has partnered with agencies such as the Chicago Metropolitan Agency for Planning to fund and facilitate water management research, planning tools and procedures, and other necessary information for decision makers.

== See also ==
- National Sea Grant College Program
- National Oceanic and Atmospheric Administration
