= Agricultural experiment station =

Facility dedicated to agricultural research

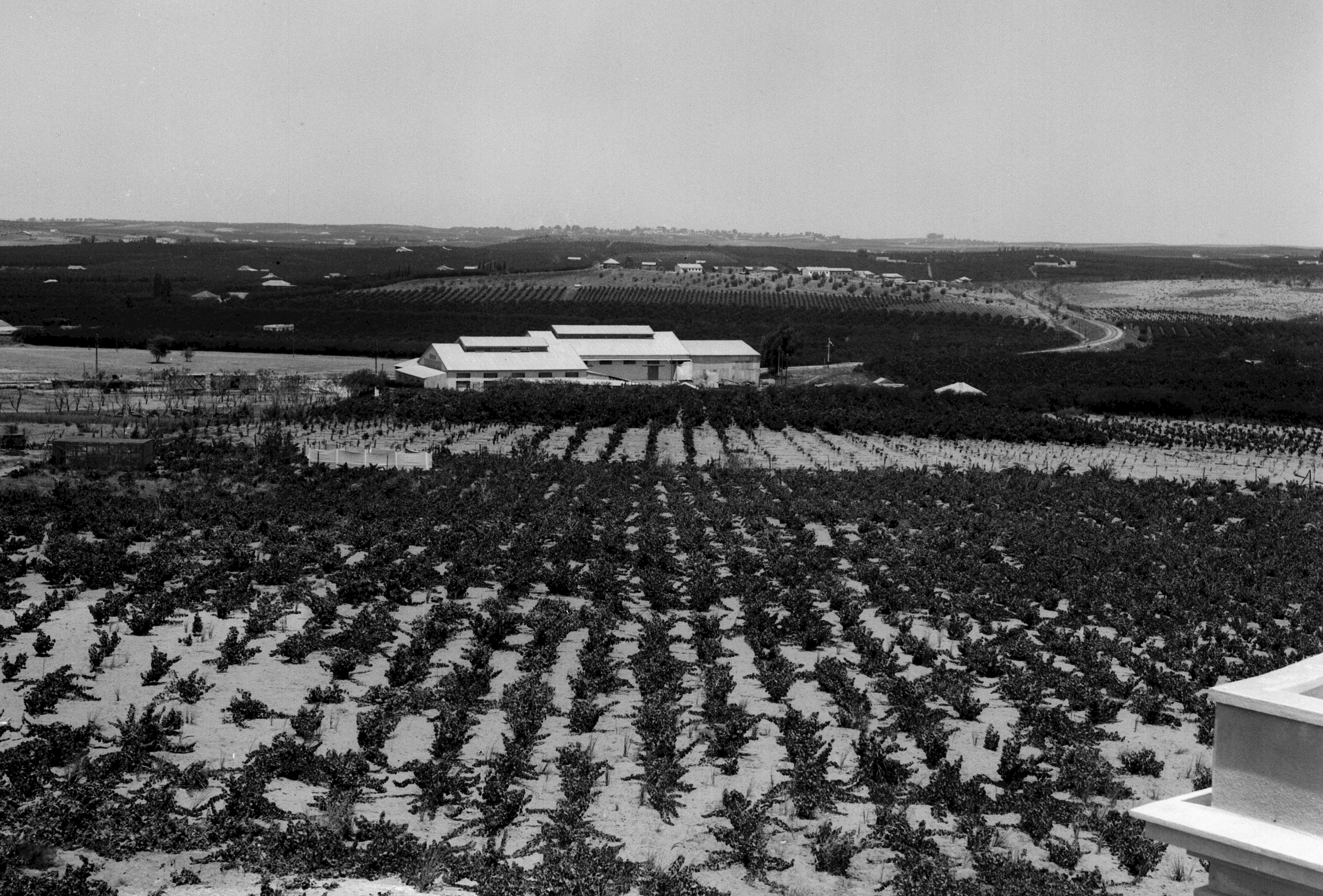
An agricultural research station, the Volcani Center, Rehovot, Israel

An agricultural experiment station or agricultural research station is a scientific research center that investigates difficulties and potential improvements to food production and agribusiness. Experiment station scientists work with farmers, ranchers, suppliers, processors, and others involved in food production and agriculture.

== Research ==
Station scientists study biological, economic, and social problems of food and agriculture and related industries in each state. They investigate such areas as crop variations, soil testing, livestock, processing and animal technology, and other advanced technology in food and agriculture. They also work with specialists called extension agents. These specialists help inform farmers about developments in agriculture. Most agricultural experiment station scientists are faculty members of the land-grant universities.

== Locations ==
=== Canada ===
In Canada, about 50 per cent (1988) of the experiment stations are controlled by the Canadian government. The Central Experimental Farm in Ottawa is the headquarters of the federal system. Private industries, universities, and agricultural colleges control the remainder of the stations. Each province has a number of provincial stations. The University of Saskatchewan has extensive agricultural experimental land.

=== Greece ===
The Benaki Phytopathological Institute conducts experiments pertaining to plant health in many locations throughout the mainland, as well as in Crete and on other Greek islands.

=== Iceland ===
The Agricultural University of Iceland maintains several experiment stations throughout the country.

=== Israel ===
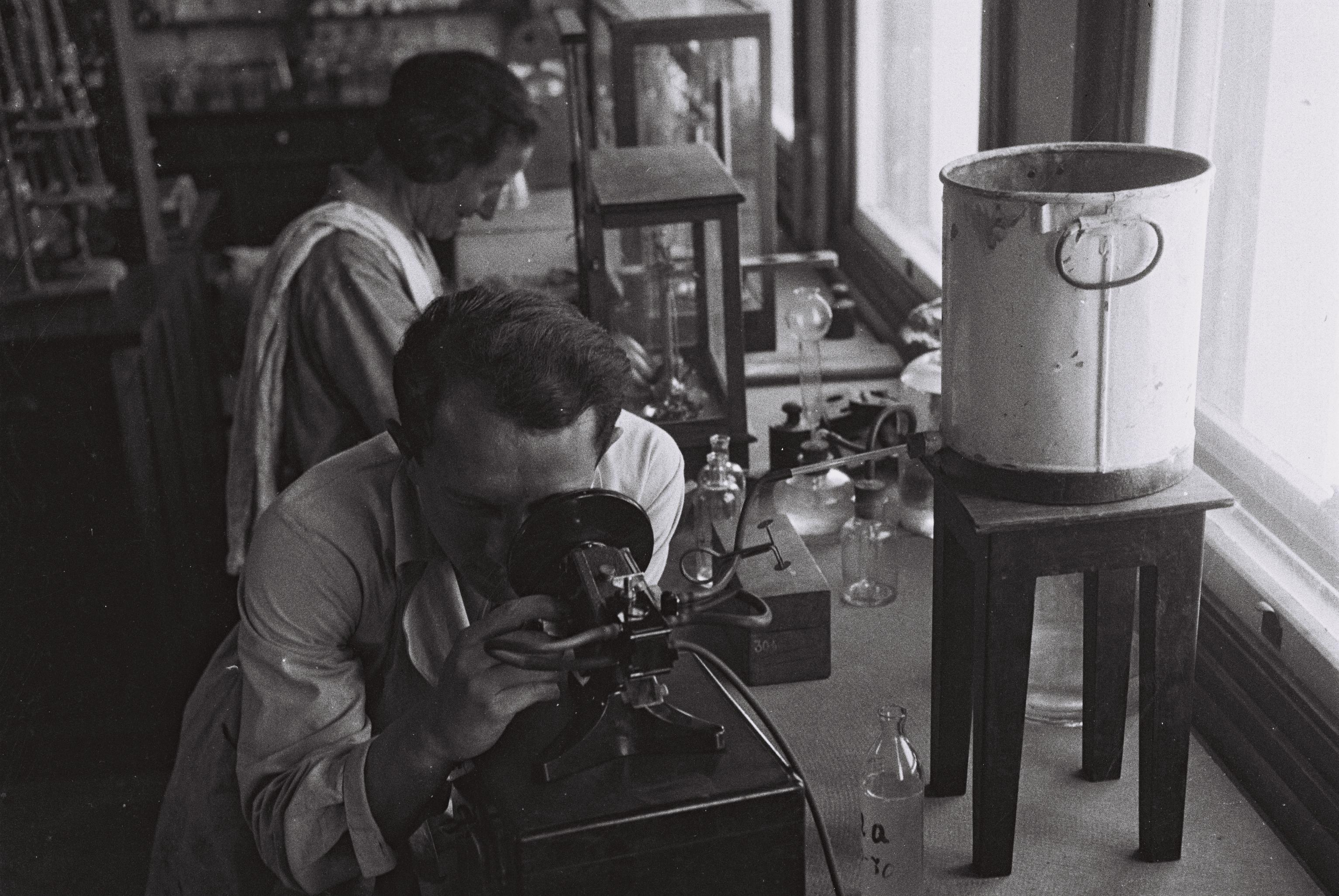
Researchers Nehma Bidner and David Lahover in the agricultural station in Rehovot, Israel

Israel host multiple agricultural stations, including the Yair Agricultural Research and Development Station in the Arava desert, the Volcani center and others. Israel is considered a global hub of water and sustainable agricultural technology.

=== India ===
The Regional Agricultural Research Station at Lam of Guntur.

=== Japan ===
Japan has five agricultural experiment stations of Independent Administrative Institution of National Agriculture and Food Research Organization, former national stations, and many other prefectural stations all over the country.

=== New Zealand ===
New Zealand has agricultural research stations at Ruakura, Winchmore and Invermay.

=== United Kingdom ===
Sutton Bridge Crop Storage Research in Sutton Bridge, Lincolnshire, is a leading UK agricultural experiment station owned by the Agriculture and Horticulture Development Board and operated by its Potato Council division, it engages in a wide range of research disciplines impacting upon crop storage for the British potato industry, including confidential contract research and development.

Syngenta's largest R&D center is at Jealott's Hill in Berkshire. Before its current incarnation it belonged to Imperial Chemical Industries.

=== United States ===
The Hatch Act of 1887 authorized the establishment of agricultural experiment stations, to be affiliated with the land grant college of agriculture, in each state (7 U.S.C. 361a et seq.). The mission of the agricultural experiment stations as set out in the Hatch Act is to conduct original research, investigation, and experiments which contribute to the establishment and maintenance of the agricultural industry in the United States. Including research pertaining to agriculture in its broadest sense as well as improvement of the rural home and rural life, and the contribution by agriculture to the welfare of the consumer. Research done at these stations underpins the curriculum of the colleges, as well as the programs of the Cooperative Extension System. The United States of America has more than 600 main experiment stations and branch stations, run by about 13,000 scientists. In some states, agricultural experiment stations are integrated into the agriculture colleges of land-grant universities; while in others they are administratively unique institutions. The structure of the agricultural experiment stations varies state-to-state in order to meet the unique needs of each state. Factors such as size of the land grant university, and size and type of agriculture in a state will affect the organization and research conducted by the station.

The United States Department of Agriculture also maintains over 90 research locations, including locations abroad. The research stations of the USDA are divided into five geographic areas across the United States, each with a centrally located station: Pacific West at Albany, California, Plains Area at Fort Collins, Colorado, Southeast Area at Stoneville, Mississippi, Midwest Area at Peoria, Illinois, and Northeast Area at Beltsville, Maryland. Henry A. Wallace Beltsville Agricultural Research Center in Beltsville is the largest of the USDA's research locations, at 6,500 acres, and contains the National Agricultural Library.

The U.S. experiment stations are state institutions. However, the federal and state governments cooperate in funding the research done at the stations. The states provide about 60 percent (1988) of the government money. Additional income comes from grants, contracts, and the sale of products. The stations receive a total income of more than $1 billion a year.

=== U. S. Virgin Islands ===
The University of the Virgin Islands maintains an experiment station on the island of St. Croix, working on agroforestry, aquaponics, biotechnology, forage agronomy, and tilapia farming, among other areas of research.

== History ==
=== France ===
In 1786, Comte d'Angiviller, acting for King Louis XVI, acquired 366 merino sheep from Spain and began an experimental program of adapting the species to France at the farm attached to Château de Rambouillet, resulting in the Rambouillet breed of sheep.

In 1836 Jean-Baptiste Boussingault established the first agricultural experiment station at Pechelbronn in Alsace.

=== Germany ===
A precursor to the agricultural experiment station was the botanical garden. For example, Christian Gottfried Daniel Nees von Esenbeck founded the Botanische Gärten der Friedrich-Wilhelms-Universität Bonn in 1818. With need for animal nutrition, scientists such as Karl Heinrich Ritthausen turned to biochemistry to investigate the comparative nutrition from grains and pulses.

==== Möckern Agricultural Experiment Station ====
Following the footsteps of the enlightenment rationalism and experimentalism, Germany began to see the rise of agricultural experiment stations, indicating the beginnings of an attempt to merge traditional agronomy with analytical chemistry. In 1840, Justus von Liebig, an influential German chemist and professor at the University of Giessen, published his book Organic Chemistry in its Application to Agriculture and Physiology. Liebig theorized that nitrogen and trace minerals from soil erosion were essential to plant nutrition, and, from this analytical chemistry perspective, simplified agriculture to a series of chemical reactions. While Liebig's work inspired a generation of analytical agricultural chemists interested in fundamental questions of plant nutrition, e.g., Wilhelm Knop and Julius von Sachs, founders of early German agricultural experiment stations did not solely seek to pursue questions of soil chemistry, but rather sought to bridge the gap between the two fields of agriculture and chemistry (agricultural chemistry).

The most well-known and earliest German experimental station, or Landwirtschaftliche Versuchsstationen, established was the Möckern Agricultural Experiment Station, located near the city of Leipzig. Created on September 28, 1850, the Möckern project was spearheaded by three Saxon men: Julius Adolph Stöckhardt, a professor of agricultural chemistry; Wilhelm Crusius, German estate owner interested in scientific agriculture; and Theodor Reuning, the German agricultural minister at the time. Though all three men took interest in Liebig's scientific approach to soil chemistry, they maintained distinct agricultural and economic focus at Möckern, and rejected a purely laboratory approach to agriculture. Unlike Liebig, Stöckhardt sought the integration of chemistry with agriculturists, rather than a specialization of chemists to come in and do the work. As a landowner who employed chemists, Crusius saw the value of chemical agriculture in economic terms to increase profit, while Reuning's support for Möckern Station represented the beginnings of governmental interest and funding of agricultural experimental stations.

Under Crusius, the Möckern Station submitted a Letter of Purpose in a government application. It specified that the Möckern Station belonging to the Leipzig Economic Society would devote itself to the advancement of agriculture via scientific investigation, through cooperation between practical farmers and scientific professionals. They listed six main research objectives, summarized below:

1. Investigation into conditions of plant growth, mainly that of soil, manure, and fertilization.
2. Analysis of plant fodder and its effects on animal products.
3. Meteorological observations.
4. Cultivation and valuation of rare plants.
5. Agricultural technology testing of implements and machines.
6. Research and creation of agricultural metrics, such as relative values of fodder.

=== Japan ===
Hokkaido Development Commission founded the very first agricultural experiment station of the country in Sapporo in 1871, under the advice of O-yatoi gaikokujin (hired foreign experts).

The first national agricultural experiment station was founded in 1893 in Tokyo, Sendai, Kanazawa, Osaka, Hiroshima, Tokushima, and Kumamoto under the Edict No.18.

The 1899 act for prefectural agricultural experiment stations supported prefectural movement to establish agricultural experiment stations all over Japan.

=== United Kingdom ===
John Bennet Lawes, with the help of Joseph Henry Gilbert, established one of the oldest agricultural experiment stations in the world: Rothamsted Experimental Station, located at Harpenden in Hertfordshire, England, was founded in 1843. This establishment was where Ronald Fisher was inspired to important advances in the theory of statistical inference and genetics. Another important agricultural experiment station was founded in 1903 and closed in 2003: Long Ashton Research Station.

=== United States ===
The movement to establish agricultural experiment stations in the US can be credited to Samuel William Johnson, who taught the first course in biochemistry. The development was recounted by William Cumming Rose:

In 1875, through Johnson's influence, the Connecticut Legislature made a small appropriation to aid the cost of a two year program of agricultural experimentation, to be conducted by Wilbur Olin Atwater at Wesleyan University, in Middletown, Connecticut. Atwater had received the Ph. D. under Johnson's direction... Two years later, the State Legislature approved the establishment of the Connecticut Agricultural Experiment Station on a permanent basis, and Johnson became its first director... At the start, it was housed in two rooms on the lower floor of Sheffield Hall of Yale University. Later... moved to a building of its own on Huntington Street in New Haven.

The Bussey Institution at Harvard University (since 1871) and the Houghton Farm at Cornwall, New York (1876–88), were privately endowed stations. By 1887 fourteen states had definite organizations and in thirteen others the colleges conducted equivalent work.

Federal aid for state experiment stations began with the Hatch Act of 1887. The Hatch Act authorized direct payment of federal grant funds to each state to establish an agricultural experiment station "under direction of" its land-grant college. Land-grant colleges had been established under the Morrill Act of 1862. The aid was increased by the Adams Act (1906) and the Purnell Act (1925). The provisions of the original Hatch Act and of later legislation providing increasing funds were combined in the Hatch Act of 1955.

The McIntire–Stennis Act of 1962 authorized forestry research studies at experiment stations.

== See also ==
- New York State Agricultural Experiment Station
- Moray (Inca ruin)
