= National Sea Grant College Program =

American research and training program

Official logo of the National Sea Grant College Program

The National Sea Grant College Program is a program of the National Oceanic and Atmospheric Administration (NOAA) within the U.S. Department of Commerce. It is a national network of 34 university-based Sea Grant programs involved in scientific research, education, training, and extension projects geared toward the conservation and practical use of the coasts, Great Lakes, and other marine areas. There are Sea Grant programs located in every coastal and Great Lakes state as well as in Puerto Rico and Guam.

The program was instituted in 1966 when Congress passed the National Sea Grant College Program Act.

Sea Grant programs and colleges are not to be confused with land-grant colleges (a program instituted in 1862), space-grant colleges (instituted in 1988), or sun-grant colleges (instituted in 2003), although an institution may also be in one or more of the other programs concurrently with being a sea-grant institution.

== History ==
At a 1963 meeting of the American Fisheries Society, a University of Minnesota professor, Athelstan Spilhaus, first suggested the establishment of Sea Grant colleges in universities that wished to develop oceanic work. The name "Sea Grant" was chosen to draw a parallel with the land-grant college program that was funded by grants of western lands to the states by the 1862 Morrill Land Grant Act of 1862. Early in the legislative process, there was consideration of leases of offshore parcels of ocean and sea bottom to fund the program by John A. Knauss and bill sponsor Claiborne Pell much like the 1862 land grants, but that plan was eventually scrapped in favor of direct congressional appropriation for the program. The 1966 Act allowed the National Science Foundation (NSF) authority to initiate and support education, research, and extension by:

Encouraging and developing programs consisting of instruction, practical demonstrations, publications, and otherwise, by sea grant colleges and other suitable institutes, laboratories, and public and private agencies through marine advisory programs with the object of imparting useful information to person currently employed or interested in the various fields related to the development of marine resources, the scientific community, and the general public.

Signing of the 1966 Sea Grant College and Program Act into law by President Lyndon B. Johnson was on October 15, 1966, as Public Law 89-688. The only major subsequent change to the Sea Grant Act was with a 1970 Reorganization Plan, whereby the Office of Sea Grant was transferred from the National Science Foundation to the newly organized National Oceanic and Atmospheric Administration, where it still resides today.

== Participating institutions ==
Institutions involved with the program include:

=== Pacific region ===
- Oregon State University
- University of Washington
- University of California, San Diego
  - California Sea Grant
- University of Southern California
- University of Alaska Fairbanks' College of Fisheries and Ocean Sciences
- University of Hawaiʻi at Mānoa
- University of Guam

=== Southeastern Atlantic and Gulf of Mexico region ===
- Gulf of Mexico sub-region
  - Texas A&M University
  - Louisiana State University
  - Mississippi-Alabama Sea Grant Consortium
    - Auburn University
    - Dauphin Island Sea Lab
    - Jackson State University
    - Mississippi State University
    - University of Alabama
    - University of Alabama at Birmingham
    - University of Mississippi
    - University of Southern Mississippi
    - University of South Alabama
- Southeast sub-region
  - Florida Sea Grant Consortium
    - University of Florida (Lead Institution)
    - Florida A&M University
    - Florida Atlantic University
    - Florida Gulf Coast University
    - Florida International University
    - Florida Institute of Technology
    - Florida State University
    - Harbor Branch Oceanographic Institute
    - Jacksonville University
    - Mote Marine Laboratory
    - New College of Florida
    - Nova Southeastern University
    - University of Central Florida
    - University of North Florida
    - University of South Florida
    - University of West Florida
    - University of Miami
  - University of Georgia
  - University of Puerto Rico
  - South Carolina Sea Grant Consortium
    - Clemson University
    - South Carolina Department of Natural Resources
    - Medical University of South Carolina
    - The Citadel
    - College of Charleston
    - South Carolina State University
    - Coastal Carolina University
    - University of South Carolina
    - Francis Marion University

=== Mid-Atlantic region ===
- North Carolina State University
- East Carolina University
- Virginia Sea Grant
  - College of William & Mary
    - Virginia Institute of Marine Science
  - Old Dominion University
  - Virginia Tech
  - University of Virginia
  - Virginia Commonwealth University
  - George Mason University
  - Norfolk State University
- University of Maryland, College Park
- University of Delaware
- New Jersey Sea Grant Consortium
  - Academy of Natural Sciences of Drexel
  - Fairleigh Dickinson University
  - Georgian Court University
  - Kean University
  - Marine Academy of Science and Technology
  - Monmouth University
  - Montclair State University
  - New Jersey Institute of Technology
  - Ramapo College of New Jersey
  - Raritan Valley Community College
  - Rowan University
  - Rutgers University
  - Seton Hall University
  - Stevens Institute of Technology
  - Stockton University
  - The College of New Jersey
  - Union County College
  - William Paterson University

=== Northeast region ===
- New York Sea Grant (Note: also participates in the Great Lakes region)
  - Stony Brook University
  - State University of New York at Buffalo
  - Cornell University
- University of Connecticut at Avery Point
- University of Rhode Island
- Massachusetts Institute of Technology
- Woods Hole Oceanographic Institution
- Lake Champlain Sea Grant
  - University of Vermont
  - State University of New York at Plattsburgh
- University of New Hampshire
- University of Maine

=== Great Lakes region ===
- Pennsylvania State University
- Ohio State University
- Michigan Sea Grant
  - Michigan State University
  - University of Michigan
- Illinois-Indiana Sea Grant College Program
  - University of Illinois at Urbana–Champaign
  - Purdue University
- University of Wisconsin–Madison
- University of Minnesota, Duluth

== See also ==
- Land-grant university
- National Space Grant College and Fellowship Program
- Sun grant colleges
