= Land-grant university =

Type of US higher education institution

Logo for the centennial of land-grant universities

A land-grant university (also called land-grant college or land-grant institution) is an institution of higher education in the United States designated by a U.S. state to receive the benefits of the Morrill Acts of 1862 and 1890, or a beneficiary under the Equity in Educational Land-Grant Status Act of 1994. There are 106 institutions in all: 57 that fall under the 1862 act, 19 under the 1890 act, and 35 under the 1994 act.

With Southerners who had blocked previous attempts at college bills absent from Congress during the Civil War, the Republican majority set up a funding system that would allow states to modernize their weak higher educational systems. The Morrill Act of 1862 provided land in the western parts of North America that states sold to fund new or existing colleges and universities. The law specified the mission of these institutions: to focus on the teaching of practical agriculture, science, military science, and engineering—although "without excluding other scientific and classical studies". This mission was in contrast to the historic practice of existing colleges which offered a narrow Classical curriculum based heavily on Latin, Greek and mathematics.

The Morrill Act quickly stimulated the creation of new state colleges and the expansion of existing institutions to include these new mandates. By 1914, land-grant colleges and universities in every state gained political support and expanded the definition and scope of university curricula to include advanced research and outreach across the state. The federal Hatch Act of 1887 established an agricultural experiment station at each school to conduct research related to the needs of improving agriculture as well as a system to disseminate information to the farmers eager to innovate. By 1917, Congress funded the teaching of agricultural subjects in the new public high schools that were opening. The Second Morrill Act of 1890 further expanded federal funding for the land-grant colleges and required the founding of land-grant colleges for African Americans in states (Southern states) that educationally segregated students by law; these institutions are now among the nation's historically black colleges and universities (HBCUs). The 1994 expansion gave land-grant status and benefits to several tribal colleges and universities. Most of the state schools were coeducational—indeed they led the way in that reform. A new department was added: home economics. However, initially, relatively few women attended and they had second-class status.

Ultimately, most land-grant schools became large state-funded public universities that offer a full spectrum of educational and research opportunities. The vast majority of land-grant institutions now are public, including over 100 institutions. Fewer than 10 land-grant universities, including Cornell University and Tuskegee University, are private.

Land-grant universities

== History ==
The concept of federal support for agricultural and technical educational institutions in every state first rose to national attention through the efforts of Jonathan Baldwin Turner of Illinois in the late 1840s. However, the first land-grant bill was introduced in Congress by Representative Justin Smith Morrill of Vermont in 1857. The bill passed in 1859, but was vetoed by President James Buchanan. Morrill resubmitted his bill in 1861, and President Abraham Lincoln signed the Morrill Act into law in 1862. The law gave every state and territory 30,000 acres (120 km^{2}) per member of Congress to be used in establishing a "land grant" university. Over 17 million acres (69,000 km^{2}) were granted through the federal land-grant law.

Recent scholarship has emphasized that many of these federal public lands had been purchased from Indigenous peoples through treaties and land cessions, often after they were defeated in war. Approximately 25% of the individual land parcels had not been purchased at all; treaties with tribes in California, for example, had been placed under seal by the U.S. Senate and were unratified at the time of the land grant.

Upon passage of the federal land-grant law in 1862, Iowa was the first state legislature to accept its provisions, on September 11, 1862. Iowa designated the State Agricultural College (now Iowa State University) as the land-grant college on March 29, 1864.

The first land-grant institution open under the Act was Kansas State University, which was established on February 16, 1863, and opened on September 2, 1863.

A second Morrill Act was passed in 1890, aimed at the former Confederate states. This act required each state to show that race was not an admissions criterion, or else to designate a separate land-grant institution for persons of color. This latter clause had the effect of facilitating segregated education, although it also provided higher educational opportunities for persons of color who otherwise would not have had them. Among the seventy colleges and universities which eventually evolved from the Morrill Acts are several of today's historically black colleges and universities. Though the 1890 Act granted cash instead of land, it granted colleges under that act the same legal standing as the 1862 Act colleges; hence the term "land-grant college" properly applies to both groups.

Later on, other colleges such as the University of the District of Columbia and the "1994 land-grant colleges" for Native Americans were also awarded cash by Congress in lieu of land to achieve "land-grant" status.

In imitation of the land-grant colleges' focus on agricultural and mechanical research, Congress later established programs of sea grant colleges (aquatic research, in 1966), space grant colleges (space research, in 1988), and sun grant colleges (sustainable energy research, in 2003).

West Virginia State University, a historically black university, is the only current land-grant university to have lost land-grant status (when desegregation cost it its state funding in 1957) and subsequently regain it, which happened in 2001.

The land-grant college system has been seen as a major contributor in the faster growth rate of the U.S. economy that led to its overtaking the United Kingdom as economic superpower, according to research by faculty from the State University of New York.

The three-part mission of the land-grant university continues to evolve in the twenty-first century. What originally was described as "teaching, research, and service" was renamed "learning, discovery, and engagement" by the Kellogg Commission on the Future of State and Land-Grant Universities. It was later recast as "talent, innovation, and place" by the Association of Public and Land-grant Universities (APLU).

Historians once presented a "Romantic" interpretation of the origins as a product of a working class democratic demand for access to higher education. Recent scholarship has abandoned this approach, showing there was little such demand. Instead middle class reformers were responsible because they thought that modern capitalism needed a better educated working class.

=== State law precedents ===
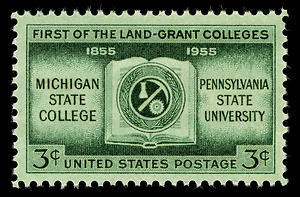
Postal Service commemorative stamp

Prior to the enactment of the Morrill Act in 1862, individual states established institutions of higher education with grants of land. The first state to do so was Georgia, which set aside 40,000 acres for higher education in 1784 and incorporated the University of Georgia in 1785.

The College Lands were a tract of land in Ohio that the Congress in 1787 donated for the support of a university. The Ohio state legislature assigned the lands in 1804 to the creation of a new school, Ohio University.

Michigan State University was chartered under state law as an agricultural land-grant institution on February 12, 1855, as the Agricultural College of the State of Michigan, receiving an appropriation of 14,000 acres (57 km^{2}) of state-owned land. The Farmers' High School of Pennsylvania (later to become The Pennsylvania State University) followed as a state agricultural land-grant school on February 22 of that year. Michigan State and Penn State were subsequently designated as the federal land-grant colleges for their states in 1863. In 1955, the U.S. Postal service issued a commemorative stamp to celebrate the two institutions as "first of the land-grant type institutions to be founded."

== Hatch Act and Smith–Lever Act ==
The mission of the land-grant universities was expanded by the Hatch Act of 1887, which provided federal funds to states to establish a series of agricultural experiment stations under the direction of each state's land-grant college, as well as pass along new information, especially in the areas of soil minerals and plant growth. The outreach mission was further expanded by the Smith–Lever Act of 1914 to include cooperative extension—the sending of agents into rural areas to help bring the results of agricultural research to the end users. Beyond the original land grants, each land-grant college receives annual federal appropriations for research and extension work on the condition that those funds are matched by state funds.

== Expansion ==
While today's land-grant universities were initially known as land-grant colleges, only a few of the more than 70 institutions that developed from the Morrill Acts retain "College" in their official names; most are universities.

The University of the District of Columbia received land-grant status in 1967 and a $7.24 million endowment (USD) in lieu of a land grant. In a 1972 Special Education Amendment, American Samoa, Guam, Micronesia, Northern Marianas, and the Virgin Islands each received $3 million.

In 1994, 29 tribal colleges and universities became land-grant institutions under the Improving America's Schools Act of 1994. As of 2008, 32 tribal colleges and universities have land-grant status in the U.S. Most of these colleges grant two-year degrees. Six are four-year institutions, and two offer a master's degree.

== Land acknowledgment statements and criticism ==
In the early 21st century, a growing number of land-grant universities have placed land acknowledgment statements on their websites in recognition of the fact that their institutions occupy lands that were once traditional territories of Native American peoples. For example, the University of Illinois System states,

These lands were the traditional birthright of indigenous peoples who were forcibly removed and who have faced two centuries of struggle for survival and identity in the wake of dispossession. We hereby acknowledge the ground on which we stand so that all who come here know that we recognize our responsibilities to the peoples of that land and that we strive to address that history so that it guides our work in the present and the future.

Another example comes from the University of Connecticut which states,

We would like to begin by acknowledging that the land on which we gather is the territory of the Eastern Pequot, Golden Hill Paugussett, Lenape, Mashantucket Pequot, Mohegan, Nipmuc and Schaghticoke Peoples who have stewarded this land throughout the generations. We thank them for their strength and resilience in protecting this land, and aspire to uphold our responsibilities according to their example.

In an article in High Country News, Robert Lee and Tristan Ahtone criticized such statements for failing to acknowledge the true breadth of the benefits derived by European Americans from formerly Native American land. They pointed out that land grants were used not only for campus sites but also included many other parcels that universities rented or sold to generate funds that formed the basis of their endowments. Lee and Ahtone also pointed out that only a few land-grant universities have undertaken significant efforts at reconciliation with respect to the latter types of parcels. For instance, they could identify what portions of their current resources are traceable to Native American lands and reallocate some of those resources to help Native Americans.

== Nomenclature ==
The "land grant" name inspired those of the sea grant, space grant and sun grant college programs established in 1965, 1988, and 2003 respectively. Some land-grant universities are also in one or more of these newer programs, whose names denote their field of research rather their original source of funding.

In the Texas A&M University System, the land-grant missions for agricultural research and extension have been relegated to a statewide agency of the university system rather than the main campus. Its agricultural missions, including the agricultural college at the system's flagship campus, are now under the umbrella of Texas A&M AgriLife.

== Relevant legislation ==
- The Morrill Act of 1862
- The Hatch Act of 1887
- The second Morrill Act of 1890
- The Adams Act – 1906
- The Nelson Act – 1907
- The Smith–Lever Act of 1914
- Chapter 79 – May 8, 1914
- The Smith–Hughes Act – 1917
- The Parnell Act – 1925
- The Capper–Ketcham Act – 1928
- The Bankhead–Jones Act of 1935
- The Bankhead–Flanagan Act – 1945
- The Research Marketing Act – 1946
- Amendment to Smith–Lever Act – 1953, 1955, 1961, 1962, 1968
- Amended Hatch Act – 1955
- The McIntire–Stennis Act – 1962
- The Research Facilities Act – 1965
- Public Law 89-106 – 1965
- The National Sea Grant College Program – 1966
- The Rural Development Act – 1972
- The Food and Agriculture Act of 1977
- The National Agricultural Research, Extension, and Teaching Policy Act of 1977 – Title XIV
- The Resource Extension Act – 1978
- Amendment to Title XIV – 1981
- The Agriculture and Food Act of 1981
- Amendment to Title XIV of Food Security Act – 1985
- Improving America's Schools Act of 1994—extended land-grant status to tribal colleges and universities

== See also ==
- Association of Public and Land-grant Universities
- College Lands, in Ohio
- List of land-grant universities
- Manual labor college
- State university
