= McIntire–Stennis Act of 1962 =

The McIntire–Stennis Act of 1962 (P.L. 87-788) makes funding available to the state agricultural experimental stations and to forestry schools and programs at the land grant colleges of agriculture for forestry research. The research covers such areas as reforestation, woodlands and related watershed management, outdoor recreation, wildlife habitats and wood utilization. Many of the research projects are performed cooperatively with scientists at the laboratories of the United States Forest Service.

McIntire-Stennis funds are distributed by a formula that allocates $10,000 to each state, with 40% of the remainder being distributed according to a state's share of the nation's total commercial forest land, 40% according to the value of its timber cut annually, and 20% according to its state appropriation for forestry research.
