= Capper–Ketcham Act =

Act to teach children about agriculture

- Long title: An Act to provide for the further development of agricultural extension work between the agricultural colleges in the several States, receiving the benefits of the Act entitled "An Act donating public lands to the several States and Territories which may provide colleges for the benefit of agriculture and the mechanic arts," approved July 2, 1862, and all Acts supplementary thereto, and the United States Department of Agriculture.
- Nicknames: Agricultural Extension Work Act of 1928
- Enacted by: the 70th United States Congress
- Effective: May 22, 1928

Citations
- Public law: Pub. L. 70–475
- Statutes at Large: 45 Stat. 711

Codification
- Titles amended: 7 U.S.C.: Agriculture
- U.S.C. sections created: 7 U.S.C. ch. 13, subch. IV § 343a
- U.S.C. sections amended: 7 U.S.C. ch. 13, subch. IV § 343

Legislative history
- Introduced in the House as H.R. 9495 by John C. Ketcham (R–MI) on January 23, 1928; Committee consideration by House Agriculture, Senate Agriculture; Passed the House on March 7, 1928 (Passed); Passed the Senate on April 16, 1928 (Passed, in lieu of S. 1285); Reported by the joint conference committee on April 20, 1928; agreed to by the House on May 5, 1928 (Agreed) and by the Senate on May 19, 1928 (Agreed); Signed into law by President Calvin Coolidge on May 22, 1928

The Capper–Ketcham Act (enacted on May 22, 1928), sponsored by Sen. Arthur Capper (R) of Kansas and Rep. John C. Ketcham (R) of Michigan, built on Senator Capper's background running "Capper Clubs" to teach children about agriculture. The legislation officially recognized and provided matching funds to States to create "4-H" clubs for demonstration work to enable counties to hire youth and home agents. It also granted federal money to agricultural extension network and the work of agricultural colleges. The "Future Farmers of America" (FFA) was founded through the Act.

== See also ==
- Morrill Land-Grant Acts
