= Sun Grant Association =

American university consortium

The Sun Grant Association is a consortium of land-grant universities in the United States that serve as regional centers for the Sun Grant Initiative. As laid out in the Sun Grant Research Initiative Act of 2003, the purpose of the program is to provide qualifying universities with federal funding for the research and development of renewable bio-based energy and technology, with the goals of enhancing U.S. energy independence, promoting the diversity and environmental sustainability of U.S. agricultural production, and addressing the issue of climate change. The federal departments of Agriculture, Energy, and Transportation are partners in the program. The initiative was initially authorized in the 2002 Farm Bill, and has been repeatedly renewed by subsequent farm bills. The Sun Grant program, along with the Sea and Space Grant programs, make up the three national grant programs based on the original concept of land-grant universities.

== Sun-grant universities ==
The following six universities house a regional center or subcenter.

- South Dakota State University – North Central Regional Center, composed of Illinois, Indiana, Iowa, Minnesota, Montana, Nebraska, North Dakota, South Dakota, Wisconsin, and Wyoming.
- University of Tennessee – Southeastern Regional Center, composed of Alabama, Florida, Georgia, Kentucky, Mississippi, North Carolina, South Carolina, Tennessee, Virginia, Puerto Rico, and the United States Virgin Islands.
- Oklahoma State University – South Central Regional Center, composed of Arkansas, Colorado, Kansas, Louisiana, Missouri, New Mexico, Oklahoma, and Texas.
- Oregon State University – Western Regional Center, composed of Alaska, Arizona, California, Hawaii, Idaho, Nevada, Oregon, Utah, Washington, Guam, American Samoa, the Northern Mariana Islands, and the freely associated states.
- University of Hawaiʻi at Mānoa – Pacific Subcenter, composed of Alaska, Hawaii, Guam, American Samoa, the Northern Mariana Islands, and the freely associated states. (Note: The Pacific Subcenter is a subcenter of the Western Regional Center.)
- Pennsylvania State University – Northeastern Regional Center, composed of Connecticut, Delaware, Massachusetts, Maryland, Maine, Michigan, New Hampshire, New Jersey, New York, Ohio, Pennsylvania, Rhode Island, Vermont, and West Virginia. (Note: Cornell University housed the Northeast Regional Center until 2014.)

== See also ==
- Land-grant university
- National Space Grant College and Fellowship Program
- National Sea Grant College Program
