= Bankhead–Jones Act of 1935 =

United States federal agriculture law

- Other short titles: Agricultural Research Act
- Long title: An Act to provide for research into basic laws and principles relating to agriculture and to provide for the further development of cooperative agricultural extension work and the more complete endowment and support of land-grant colleges.
- Enacted by: the 74th United States Congress

Citations
- Public law: Pub. L. 74–182
- Statutes at Large: 49 Stat. 436

Codification
- Titles amended: 7 U.S.C.: Agriculture
- U.S.C. sections created: 7 U.S.C. ch. 17 § 427

Legislative history
- Signed into law by President Franklin D. Roosevelt on June 29, 1935

The Bankhead–Jones Act was enacted on June 29, 1935 during the Depression, to provide increased federal funding to land grant colleges. Under the law as was last increased in 1972, $8,100,000 per year is divided equally between all states, and another $4,360,000 is divided between the states based upon each state's population. These federal funds are subject to matching by the states.
