= Hatch Act of 1887 =

United States federal law

- Long title: An Act to establish agricultural experiment stations in connection with the colleges established in the several States under the provisions of an act approved July second, eighteen hundred and sixty-two, and of the acts supplementary thereto.
- Enacted by: the 49th United States Congress
- Effective: March 2, 1887

Citations
- Public law: Pub. L. 49–314
- Statutes at Large: 24 Stat. 440, Chapter 314

Codification
- Titles amended: 7 U.S.C.: Agriculture
- U.S.C. sections created: 7 U.S.C. ch. 14 § 361a et seq.

Legislative history
- Introduced in the House as H.R. 3066 by William H. Hatch (D-MO); Passed the House on (Passed); Passed the Senate on January 25, 1887 (25-16, in lieu of S. 372); Signed into law by President Grover Cleveland on March 2, 1887

The Hatch Act of 1887 (ch. 314, 24 Stat. 440, enacted 1887-03-02, 7 U.S.C. § 361a et seq.) gave federal funds, initially $15,000 each, to state land-grant colleges in order to create a series of agricultural experiment stations, as well as pass along new information, especially in the areas of soil minerals and plant growth. The bill was named for Congressman William Hatch, who chaired the House Committee of Agriculture at the time the bill was introduced. State agricultural stations created under this act were usually connected with those land-grant state colleges and universities founded under the Morrill Act of 1862, with few exceptions.

Many stations founded under the Hatch Act later became the foundations for state cooperative extension services under the Smith–Lever Act of 1914.

Congress amended the act in 1955 to add a formula that uses rural and farm population factors to allocate the annual appropriation for agricultural experiment stations among the states. Under the 2002 farm bill (P.L. 107–171, Sec. 7212), states will continue to be required to provide at least 100% matching funds (traditionally, most states have provided more). On average, Hatch Act formula funds constitute 10% of total funding for each experiment station. (7 U.S.C. 361a et seq.).

== See also ==
- Adams Act of 1906
- Purnell Act of 1925
- Bankhead–Jones Act of 1935
- George W. Atherton
