= Smith–Lever Act of 1914 =

United States law establishing agricultural extension services at land-grant universities

Smith-Lever Act
- Other short titles: Agriculture Extension Act
- Long title: An Act to provide for cooperative agricultural extension work between the agricultural colleges in the several States receiving the benefits of an act of congress approved July second, eighteen hundred and sixty-two, and of acts supplementary thereto, and the United States Department of Agriculture.
- Enacted by: the 63rd United States Congress
- Effective: May 8, 1914

Citations
- Public law: Pub. L. 63–95
- Statutes at Large: 38 Stat. 372, Chapter 79

Codification
- Titles amended: 7 U.S.C.: Agriculture
- U.S.C. sections created: 7 U.S.C. ch. 13 § 341

Legislative history
- Introduced in the Senate by Hoke Smith (D-GA), Asbury Lever (D-SC); Signed into law by President Woodrow Wilson on May 8, 1914

The Smith–Lever Act of 1914 is a United States federal law that established a system of cooperative extension services, connected to land-grant universities, intended to inform citizens about current developments in agriculture, home economics, public policy/government, leadership, 4-H, economic development, coastal issues (National Sea Grant College Program), and related subjects. The Act helped farmers learn new agricultural techniques by the introduction of home instruction.

The budgeting appropriation for cooperative extension is shared between the states based on an established formula. Once the historic amount that has been allocated for "special needs" programs is set aside and an additional 4% is reserved for USDA administrative costs, the remaining funds are allocated:

- 20% shared by all States in equal proportions;
- 40% shared in the proportion that the rural population of each bears to the total rural population of the several States as determined by the census;
- 40% shared in the proportion that the farm population of each bears to the total farm population of the several States as determined by the census.

Except for the "1994 Land-grant colleges" for Native Americans, each state must match its Federal cooperative extension funds.

In addition, an amount no less than 6% of the total Smith-Lever Act appropriation is allocated for the extension programs of the "1890 Land-grant colleges" (historically black colleges). These funds are also shared between the 1890 colleges by the 20/40/40% formula, with Alabama A&M and Tuskegee University treated as though they were in different states.

In 1964, a US stamp was issued honoring homemakers for the 50th anniversary of the Smith–Lever Act.

== See also ==
- Extension Service of the USDA
- Martha Van Rensselaer
