= WGDQ =

- Sumrall, Mississippi; United States
- Broadcast area: Hattiesburg-Laurel
- Frequency: 93.1 MHz
- Branding: 93.1 WGDQ

Programming
- Language: English
- Format: Urban gospel

Ownership
- Owner: Circuit Broadcasting of Hattiesburg
- Sister stations: WJMG; WORV

History
- First air date: 2005
- Call sign meaning: What God Did Quickly

Technical information
- Licensing authority: FCC
- Facility ID: 68907
- Class: C3
- ERP: 25,000 watts
- HAAT: 92 meters (302 feet)
- Transmitter coordinates: 31°22′58.60″N 89°23′43.20″W

Links
- Public license information: Public file; LMS
- Website: http://931wgdq.com/

WGDQ (93.1 FM, "WGDQ") is a commercial radio station licensed to Sumrall, Mississippi, United States, and serving the Hattiesburg-Laurel area. The station broadcasts an urban gospel format. Its transmitter is located in Rawls Springs, Mississippi.
