= WJMG =

- Hattiesburg, Mississippi; United States
- Broadcast area: Hattiesburg
- Frequency: 92.1 MHz
- Branding: G 92.1

Programming
- Language: English
- Format: Urban Contemporary

Ownership
- Owner: Circuit Broadcasting
- Sister stations: WGDQ; WORV

History
- First air date: 1982

Technical information
- Licensing authority: FCC
- Facility ID: 11226
- Class: A
- ERP: 6,000 watts
- HAAT: 91 meters (299 feet)
- Transmitter coordinates: 31°20′33.60″N 89°17′53.20″W

Links
- Public license information: Public file; LMS
- Website: 921wjmg.com WJMG Facebook

WJMG (92.1 FM, "G 92.1") is a commercial radio station licensed to Hattiesburg, Mississippi, United States. The station airs an urban contemporary format.

It, along with sister station WORV, are owned by Vernon C. Floyd of Hattiesburg. A licensed broadcast engineer, he did much of the work himself in the construction of the two stations' facility located in North Hattiesburg.
