= Iola Williams =

American politician, civil rights activist, and museum executive (1936–2019)

San Jose City Council member
- In office 1979–1991
- Preceded by: Susanne Wilson
- Succeeded by: ?

Personal details
- Born: Iola Craft; February 2, 1936 Hattiesburg, Mississippi
- Died: April 4, 2019 (aged 83) Lampasas, Texas
- Party: Democratic Party
- Spouse: George Williams

Iola M. Williams (February 2, 1936 – April 4, 2019) was an American politician, public official, civil rights activist and museum executive. In 1979, Williams became the first African-American to join the San Jose City Council, an office she held from her appointment in 1979 until her retirement from council in 1991. During this time, she also served as the Vice Mayor of San Jose, California for two terms.

Williams was instrumental in the creation of the African American Military History Museum in Hattiesburg, Mississippi, as the institution's former executive director. She saved the museum's original, existing structure, which had opened in 1942 as a USO Club for African American soldiers stationed at nearby Camp Shelby during World War II. Under Williams, the former USO Club building was preserved, renovated and re-opened as the African American Military History Museum in 2009.

== Early life ==
Williams was born Iola Craft on February 2, 1936, in Hattiesburg, Mississippi to parents who were a teacher and warehouse worker. She attended the Eureka School in Hattiesburg, the first brick black school building constructed in the state of Mississippi during segregation.

In 1955, Croft married George Williams Sr., a United States Air Force non-commissioned officer from her neighborhood. George Williams eventually rose to the rank of master sergeant during his career. The couple had seven children within the first ten years of their marriage - four daughters, Jenifer, Audrey, Beverly, and Ila, and three sons, Vincent, George Jr., and Kevin. Iola Williams and her family moved frequently due to her husband's Air Force career. The family were stationed in bases in South Carolina, Texas, Virginia, Illinois, and California, as well as three years in Europe, including a base in West Germany.

In 1966, while Iola Williams was living overseas, the Ku Klux Klan attacked and fire bombed the home of her cousin, Vernon Dahmer, who had been using his grocery store to help black residents of Hattiesburg register to vote. Dahmer died from burns sustained in the attack and his murder drew national attention.

== Political career ==
In 1969, Iola Williams and her family moved to San Jose, California, where her husband had been hired as a mechanic for United Airlines. At this point, Williams had studied to become a licensed vocational nurse and began work at O'Connor Hospital in San Jose. The Williams attended Antioch Baptist Church in downtown San Jose, which The Mercury News described as "an incubator of emerging black leaders." Iola Williams played the piano, sang in the church choir and volunteered in the church's school, which would lead to her interest in running for the local school board.

In 1970, Iola Williams became the first African-American to be elected to the Franklin-McKinley School District school board, which covers a portion of the city of San Jose. She served on the school board from 1970 until her appointment to the San Jose City Council in 1979. Williams' election to the school board marked the beginning of a wave of female candidates who were elected to public office throughout Santa Clara County during the 1970s. The county became known as the "feminist capital of the world" due to the unprecedented number of female elected officials during this era. Notable women who entered elected politics the decade included Williams and Janet Gray Hayes, who became the first female Mayor of San Jose in 1975. Women also gained majorities on the San Jose City Council and the Santa Clara County Board of Supervisors, a rarity in the United States at this time. Williams credited the rise of other female politicians in Santa Clara County with helping her enter politics and navigate the political landscape during the 1970s.

Williams began her public career by serving on the Franklin-McKinley School District school board, which covers a portion of the city of San Jose, California, for 12 years, until her appointment to the San Jose City Council in 1979. A young Ken Yeager, and future District 6 City Councilmember, worked with William's campaign.

Williams launched an unsuccessful attempt to unseat San Jose councilman Joe Colla in the late 1970s using the creative campaign slogan "Iola the Un-Colla", but lost the race.

However, soon after the 1978 election, incumbent San Jose Council member Susanne Wilson vacated her seat following her election to the country-wide Santa Clara County Board of Supervisors. (Wilson had previously become the third women elected to San Jose City Council back in 1974.) Iola Williams was appointed fill Wilson's newly vacant seat on the San Jose City Council in 1979, becoming the first African-American to serve on the council in its history. She was elected to her first full term in 1980. Williams served on the city council from 1979 until her retirement in 1991, including two simultaneous terms as the Vice Mayor of San Jose.

In 1980, shortly after joining city council, Williams received and completed a United States Department of Housing and Urban Development (HUD) fellowship to the John F. Kennedy School of Government at Harvard University.

Williams was known as a champion for minority and women's rights during her tenure on city council. According to Ken Yeager, a former member of the Santa Clara County Board of Supervisors who worked on Williams' political campaigns for school board and city council during the 1970s, "Iola was a pivotal figure in the civil rights movement...As the first African American to serve on the San Jose City Council, she led the way for other minorities to run for office." Yeager also praised her contributions to equal rights, noting that, "She was so open and so friendly and someone who just had a remarkable moral compass at a time when there was still a lot of controversy over women’s rights, African American rights, gay rights." In 1986, when a local gay rights organization called Bay Area Municipal Elections Committee (BAYMEC) held in its first dinner, Iola Williams was the only elected official to attend the event.

During the 1980s, members of the Ku Klux Klan applied for a permit to march through downtown San Jose. Iola Williams had grown up in segregated Mississippi and her cousin, activist Vernon Dahmer, had been murdered in a KKK attack in Hattiesburg in 1966. However, Iola Williams surprised observers and colleagues by voting to allow the march in San Jose, citing her commitment to civil rights. According to her daughter, Jenifer Williams, "People were surprised. They didn't know where that vote was coming from. It was coming from her own life experiences. She said that her cousin had died for those civil rights."

Iola Williams also focused on San Jose's neighborhoods and local services. For example, she supported San Jose's shift to district elections for the city council, which gave neighborhoods more of a voice in choosing their council members. She also cast a deciding vote to keep the city's 10th and 11th as one-way streets due to traffic concerns and the safety of pedestrians.

She and her colleagues on the city council established a new program to aide senior citizens access healthcare services. The program, which she described as her greatest achievement, was later renamed the Iola Williams Seniors Program by city council in her honor.

Williams achieved influential positions in California's state politics as well. She was elected president of the League of California Cities, a nonpartisan association of state city officials. She also served on the League's human resource committee, as well as the organization's board of directors, which represents California cities in both the Governor's Office of Planning and Research Council and state Task Force on Civil Rights.

Williams served in leadership roles within the statewide California Democratic Party. Iola Williams can also be credited with saving the life of her 17 year old neighbor, from committing suicide, when he was suffering from an internal crisis. Iola Williams also insisted that the incident receive no media coverage to protect the young man and his family.

== Return to Mississippi ==
In 1991, Williams decided not to seek re-election and retired from the San Jose City Council. Her husband also retired from his position as an airline mechanic in the early 1990s. Williams and her husband returned to Hattiesburg, Mississippi, without telling their friends or co-workers, shortly after leaving office. During her years in California, Williams had visited Hattiesburg frequently to take care of her mother and kept a small mobile home in the area for this reason. Once back in her hometown, Williams would become deeply involved with a number of local, government, economic development, and community organizations.

Soon after returning to Mississippi, Hattiesburg Mayor J. Ed Morgan invited Williams to join the city administration and appointed her as the Director of Recreation and Community Relations in 1992. At the time of her hiring, Mayor Morgan noted that the city government could not pay Williams a salary comparable to those available back in California. However, Morgan promised Williams that the city would help redevelop a neglected former USO Club (and, later, a former library and community center), which the city acquired in 1993. The club, which had opened in 1942 as a venue for African-American servicemen from Camp Shelby during World War II, stood in the historic black neighborhood of Mobile. The plan was greeted with optimism at the time by local leaders, including the then-president of the Mobile-Bouie Neighborhood Association.

Williams, as head of the community relations office, asked local military veterans to donate and locate artifacts which would be displayed at a new proposed museum at the USO club site. The new, proposed museum would later become known as the African American Military History Museum. During the same time period, the Hattiesburg Convention Commission was created by the Mississippi State Legislature during the 1990s to grow and fund Hattiesburg's tourism, convention and economic development sectors, including the construction of new facilities and infrastructure. A 2 percent sales tax on food and beverages at local restaurants was enacted to provide funding to improve new and exiting city buildings, including renovations to the Saenger Theater and the new Lake Terrace Convention Center.

Revenue from the Hattiesburg Convention Commission was also allocated to Williams' proposed museum at the USO club. The renovation of the existing USO Club, which was preserved during its transition into the museum, cost an estimated $1.1 million, according to an annual report issued by the Hattiesburg Convention Commission. Another $400,000 was needed to create the new museum's collections and exhibits.

The African American Military History Museum opened to the public on May 23, 2009. It is the only existing USO Club that served African American servicemen during World War II that remains in use in the United States. In an interview, Williams described her favorite exhibit as the one featuring Ruth Bailey Earl, a United States Army nurse who served during World War II. She praised Earl, who died in 2004, saying, "Ruth Earl was much older than I and I admired her so much...She was the black nurse at the health department clinic. When she returned to Hattiesburg, she remembered me and stopped by my office anytime she was downtown. She was one of the most uninhibited persons I have ever known. She would always have something comical to say. She was always fashionable. She lit up any room. She would never talk about her time in the military. She would only to say, 'The army treated us so bad. You would not believe me if I told you how we were treated as black nurses."

Iola Williams served as a Hattiesburg Convention Commission commissioner from 2004 until 2014 for three terms. Hattiesburg Mayor Johnny DuPree reappointed her to her final term on the commission from August 18, 2012, until her retirement on August 17, 2014.

Iola and George Williams established a lunch program for local Mississippi senior citizens who had been impacted by Hurricane Katrina in 2006.

== Later life ==
In January 2016, she returned to San Jose to receive the Lifetime Achievement Award from the African-American Community Service Agency. That same year, the award was renamed in her honor. She reminded attendees that her own relatives had been unable to vote during their lifetimes, "My grandmother could not vote. My mother, it wasn't until the 70s until she could vote. So a lot of things happened during that time. They seemed like little things but they carried families through the years. We have seen a lot of the things that remain, but there's so much that has to be done." Williams also joked during her acceptance speech that "I'm glad I got my flowers while I'm still alive." Attendees at the 2016 awards, held at the San Jose Scottish Rite Temple, included U.S. Reps. Zoe Lofgren and Rep. Mike Honda.

Iola Williams and her husband moved to Lampasas, Texas, to be closer to her family following her diagnosis with Parkinson's disease. She died from Parkinson's disease in Lampasas on April 4, 2019, at the age of 83. Iola Williams was survived by her husband, George, seven children, seventeen grandchildren, and seven great-grandchildren. Her funeral was held on April 20, 2019.
