= WHJA =

Radio station in Laurel, Mississippi

- Laurel, Mississippi; United States
- Broadcast area: Hattiesburg
- Frequency: 890 kHz
- Branding: Power 101.1 FM

Programming
- Language: English
- Format: Urban contemporary
- Affiliations: Compass Media Networks

Ownership
- Owner: Donald Pugh, Sr.; (Eternity Media Group, LLC)
- Sister stations: WABF; WNRR

History
- First air date: February 1957
- Former call signs: WNSL (1957–1979); WQIS (1979–1999); WEEZ (1999–2008)
- Former frequencies: 1260 kHz

Technical information
- Licensing authority: FCC
- Facility ID: 16785
- Class: D
- Power: 10,000 watts (day and critical hours)
- Transmitter coordinates: 31°31′29.60″N 89°14′31.20″W
- Translator: 101.1 W266CT (Laurel)

Links
- Public license information: Public file; LMS
- Webcast: Listen Live
- Website: powerstation101.com

WHJA (890 AM, "Power 101") is a commercial radio station licensed to Laurel, Mississippi, United States, and serving the Hattiesburg, Mississippi, area. The station is owned by Donald Pugh, Sr., through licensee Eternity Media Group, LLC. It airs an urban contemporary format.

The station was assigned the WHJA call letters by the Federal Communications Commission on August 1, 2008.

== History ==
The station began as WQIS "Q-89" in 1985 when WQIS moved from 1260 kHz to occupy the present transmitter tower, in Moselle, Mississippi; once occupied by sister station WNSL-FM. Q-89 was a daytime only R&B station serving Laurel and Hattiesburg; the station changed the format to easy listening and became "Kiss 890" in the 1990s. After Clear Channel Communications acquired WQIS, the call letters were changed. The original WEEZ call letters were assigned to FM 99.3 as an easy listening/soft rock station operated by WAML in the 1980s. In the 1990s, WEEZ changed to gospel music and became known as "Gospel 99". The call letters at 99.3 MHz changed to WHER "Eagle 99" playing classic rock following the acquisition by Clear Channel.

The station went silent on August 25, 2008. According to the station's application to the FCC for authority to remain silent, the station suffered a "massive transmitter failure" and they claim that "repair of the facility may not be economically feasible." The application notes that the financial performance of the station is being assessed "in light of the needed technical expenditures."

The station's license has been through a series of changes since 2010. On April 6, 2011, Clear Channel donated WHJA to the Minority Media and Telecommunications Council (MMTC). On May 1, 2013, MMTC sold the station to Donald H. Pugh, Jr. for $5,000 and the station returned to the air in June 2013. Pugh, Jr. subsequently assigned the station's license to Donald Pugh, Sr. on January 22, 2014.

On January 23, 2017, WHJA changed their format from urban gospel to classic hip hop, branded as "Power 101" (simulcast on translator W266CT 101.1 FM Laurel).

Effective March 2, 2018, Donald Pugh, Sr. transferred the station's license to his wholly owned Eternity Media Group LLC.
