= Turtle Creek Mall =

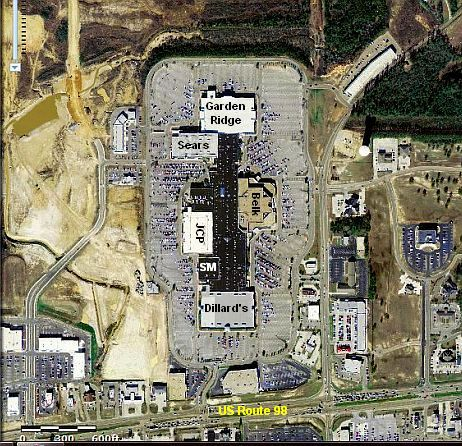
- Aerial view of Turtle Creek Mall and anchor stores in 2014
- Location: Hattiesburg, Mississippi, United States
- Coordinates: 31.327°N 89.376°W
- Address: 1000 Turtle Creek Drive
- Opened: 1994
- Developer: CBL & Associates Properties
- Owner: CBL & Associates Properties
- Num. of stores: 75
- Num. of anchor tenants: 6 (5 open, 1 vacant)
- Floor area: 845,508 square feet
- Floors: 1 (2 in former Sears)

Turtle Creek Mall is an enclosed shopping mall located in Hattiesburg, Mississippi, United States. Opened in 1994, its anchor stores are At Home, JCPenney, Dillard's, Belk, and Urban Planet. There is 1 vacant anchor store that was once Sears.

== History ==
The first anchor stores that opened at Turtle Creek were Dillard's, Gayfers, and Goody's, all of which opened in October 1994. McRae's and JCPenney were added in 1995. By 1999, Turtle Creek was at 100 percent capacity.

On June 3, 2004, Chuck E. Cheese opened inside the mall, replacing the former Luby's location.

The Gayfers anchor was converted into a second McRae's location when Gayfers was bought out by Dillard's in 1998. Both were acquired by Belk in 2006, which consolidated all operations into the former Gayfers anchor in 2010. Goody's closed in 2009 and was converted into Stein Mart in 2011. In 2014, the Garden Ridge anchor store was rebranded into At Home.

On May 31, 2018, it was announced that Sears would be closing 72 of its stores in the U.S., including its Turtle Creek location, which closed in September 2018.

On August 12, 2020, it was announced that Stein Mart had filed bankruptcy and would be closing all of its stores in the U.S., including its Turtle Creek location. By 2023, the former Stein Mart location was occupied by an Urban Planet clothing store.
