= Hattiesburg, Mississippi =

Hattiesburg
- City
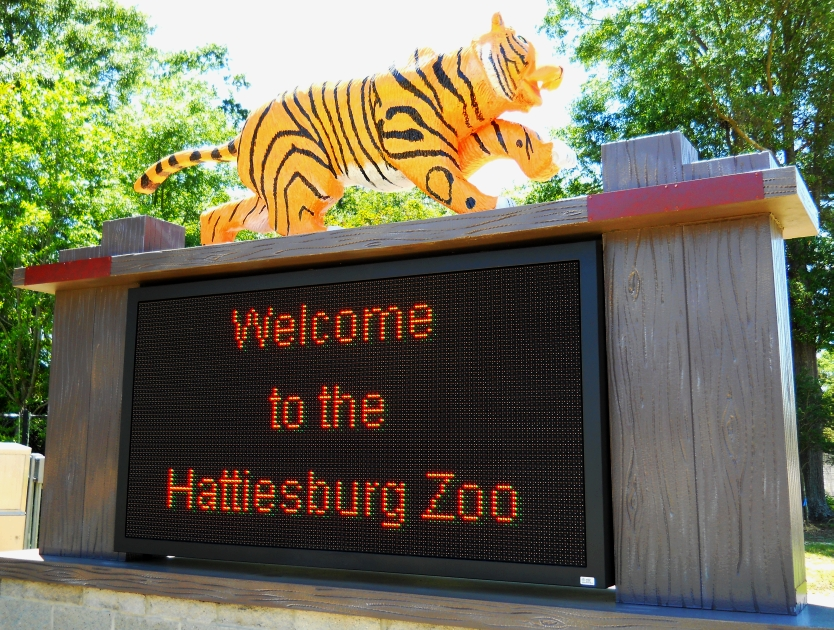
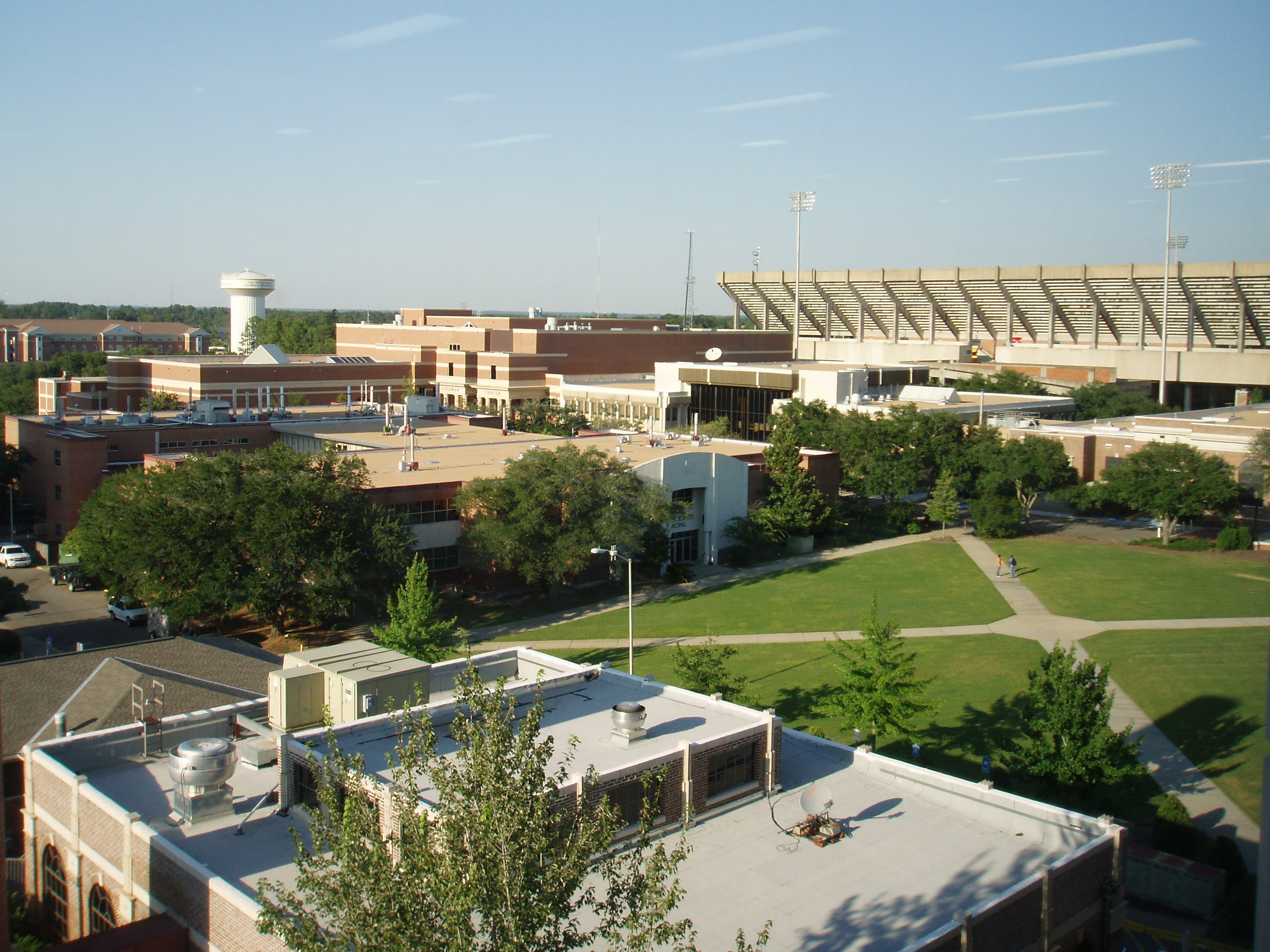
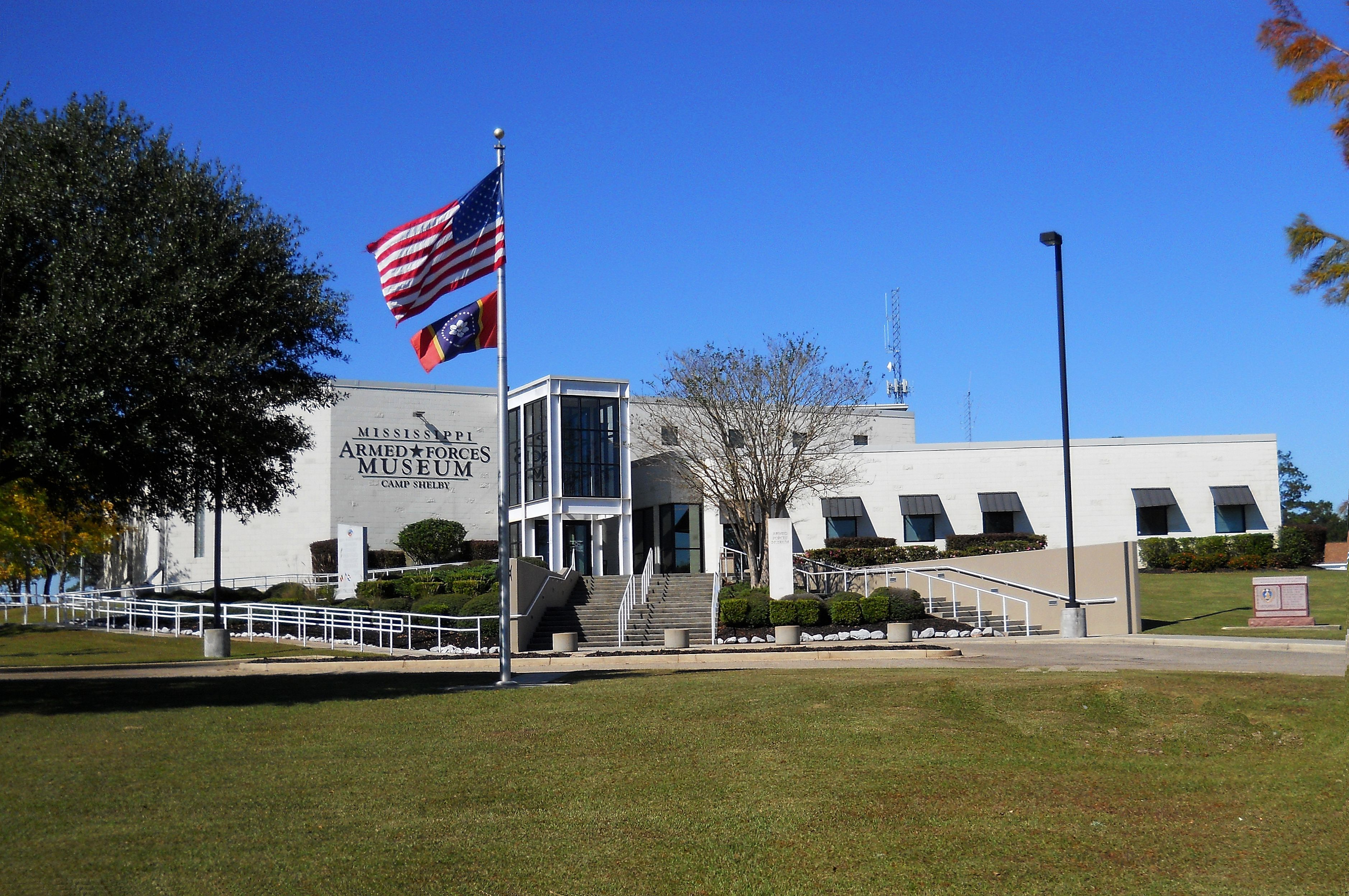
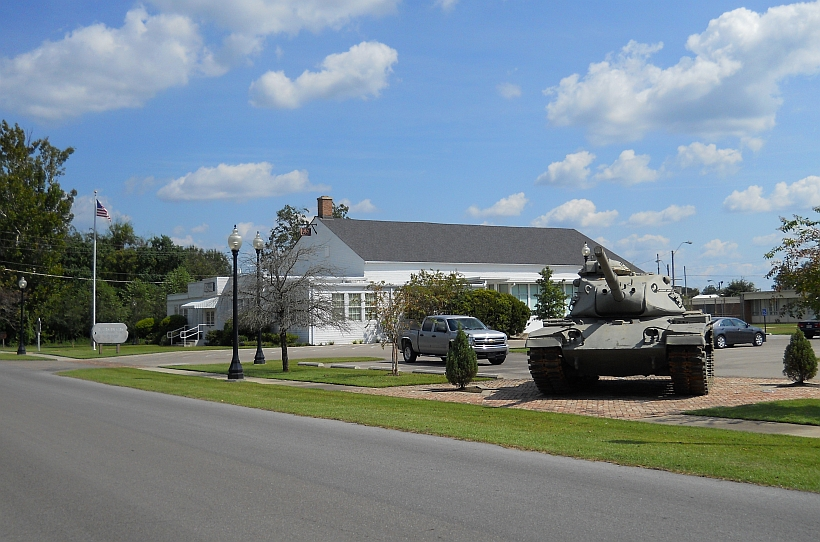
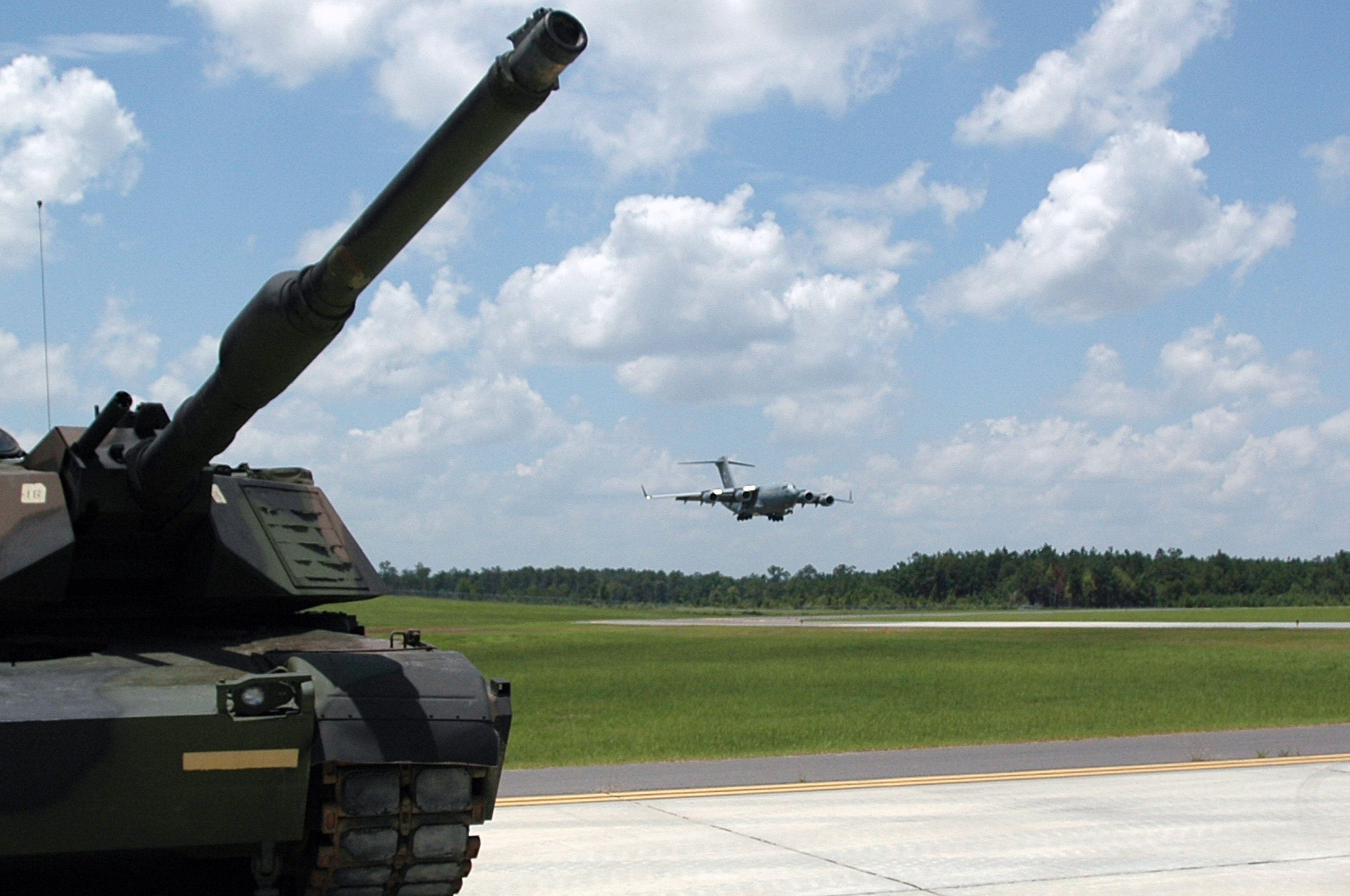
- Downtown Hattiesburg Hattiesburg Zoo University of Southern Mississippi Mississippi Armed Forces Museum African American Military History Museum Camp Shelby

- Flag
- Nickname: The Hub City
- Interactive map of Hattiesburg
- Location in the United States Hattiesburg (Mississippi)
- Coordinates: 31°18′57″N 89°18′31″W
- Country: United States
- State: Mississippi
- Counties: Forrest, Lamar
- Founded: 1882
- Incorporated: 1884
- Named for: Hattie Hardy

Government
  - Mayor: Toby Barker (I)

Area
  - City: 54.48 sq mi (141.11 km^{2})
  - Land: 53.44 sq mi (138.41 km^{2})
  - Water: 1.04 sq mi (2.70 km^{2})
  - Metro: 2,023.7 sq mi (5,241 km^{2})
- Elevation: 171 ft (52 m)

Population (2020)
  - City: 48,730
  - Density: 911.9/sq mi (352.07/km^{2})
  - Metro: 172,507
- Demonym: Hattiesburger
- Time zone: UTC−6 (CST)
  - Summer (DST): UTC−5 (CDT)
- ZIP code: 39401-39404, 39406, 39407
- Area codes: 601, 769
- FIPS code: 28-31020
- GNIS feature ID: 0691565
- Website: hattiesburgms.com

Hattiesburg is a city in the U.S. state of Mississippi, located primarily in Forrest County (where it is the county seat and most populous city) and extending west into Lamar County. The city population was 48,730 in 2020, making it the 5th most populous city in Mississippi. Hattiesburg is the principal city of the Hattiesburg Metropolitan Statistical Area, which encompasses Covington, Forrest, Lamar, and Perry counties. The city is the anchor of the Pine Belt region.

Founded in 1882 by civil engineer William H. Hardy, Hattiesburg was named in honor of Hardy's wife Hattie. The town was incorporated two years later with a population of 400. Development of the interior of Mississippi took place primarily after the American Civil War. Before that time, only properties along the major rivers were developed as plantations. Hattiesburg's population first expanded as a center of the lumber and railroad industries, from which was derived the nickname "The Hub City".

Hattiesburg is a prominent university town, home to the University of Southern Mississippi (founded as Mississippi Normal College, for the training of teachers) and William Carey University (formerly William Carey College). South of Hattiesburg is Camp Shelby, the largest US National Guard training base east of the Mississippi River, which hosts up to 100,000 National Guardsmen and Reservists annually.

== History ==
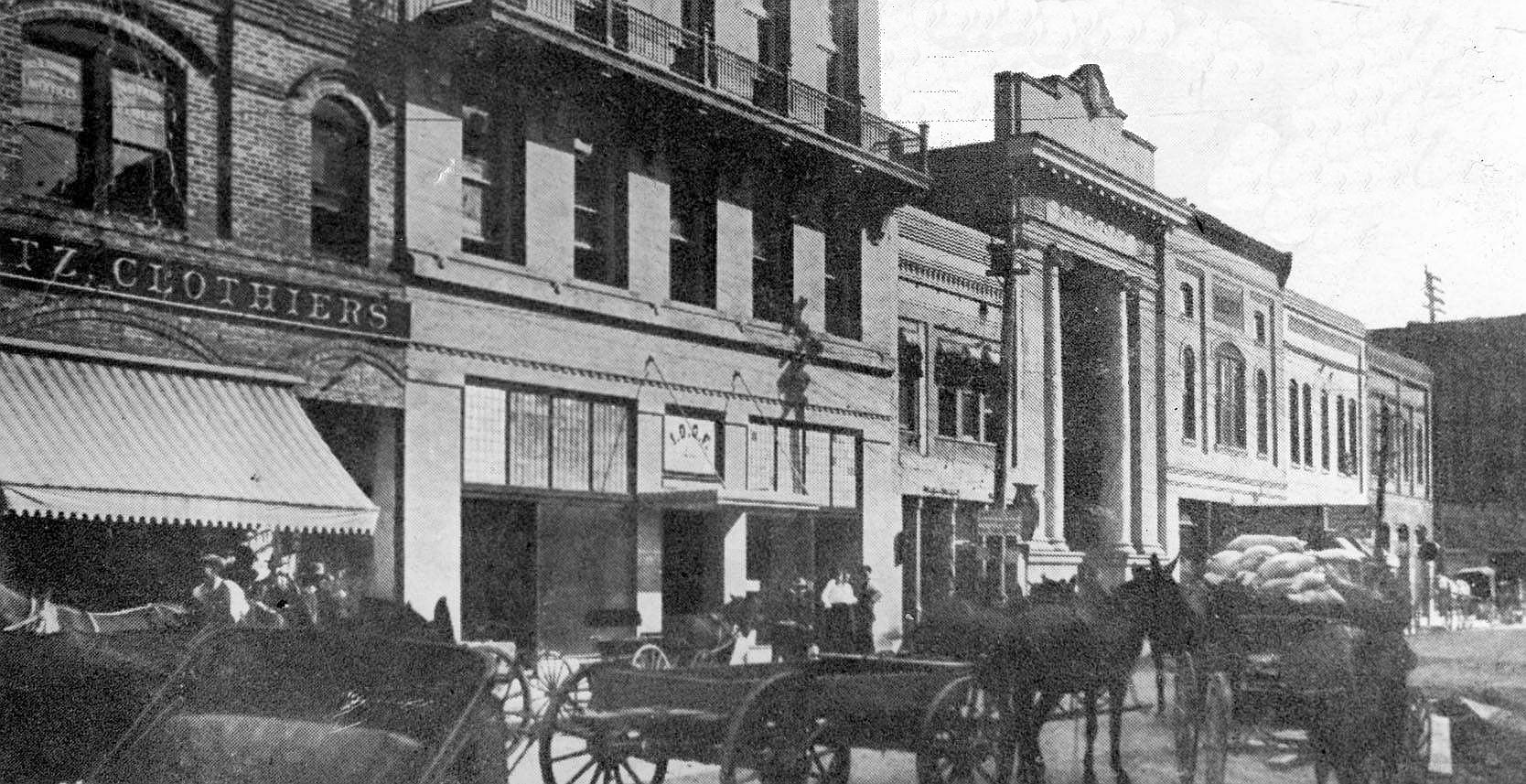
Front Street, c. 1900

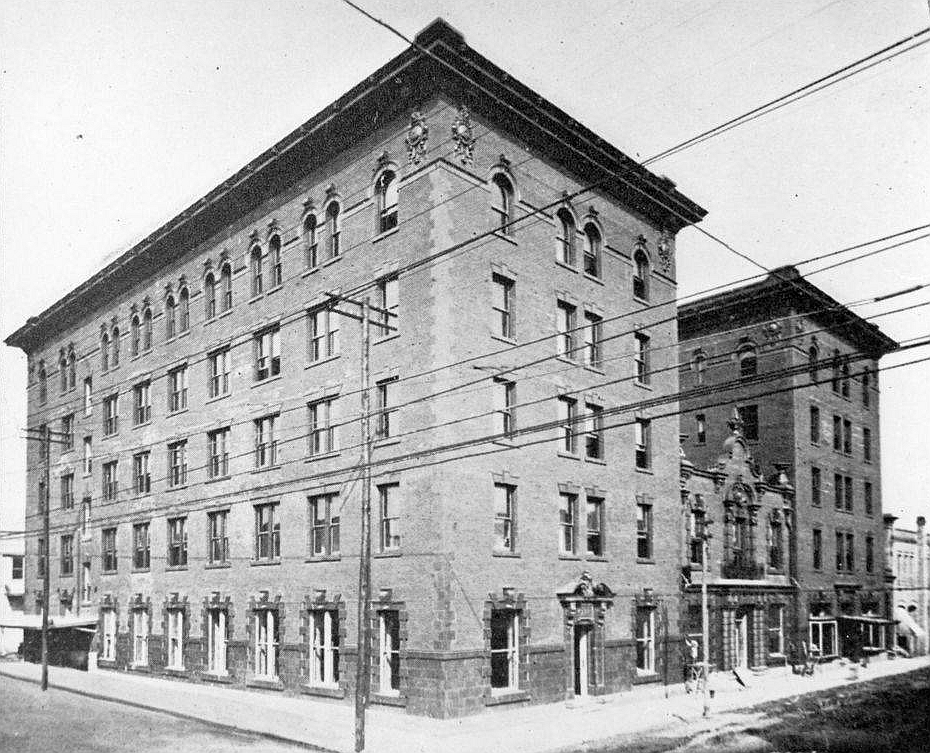
The now-demolished Hotel Hattiesburg opened in 1906 at the corner of Pine and Mobile streets. The elegant hotel was constructed and owned by Joseph T. Jones, owner of the Gulf and Ship Island Railroad.

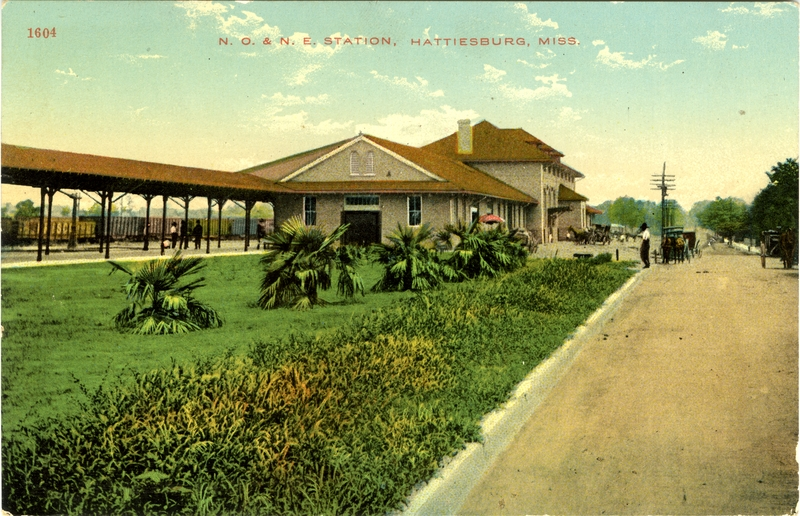
Union Station, c. 1910

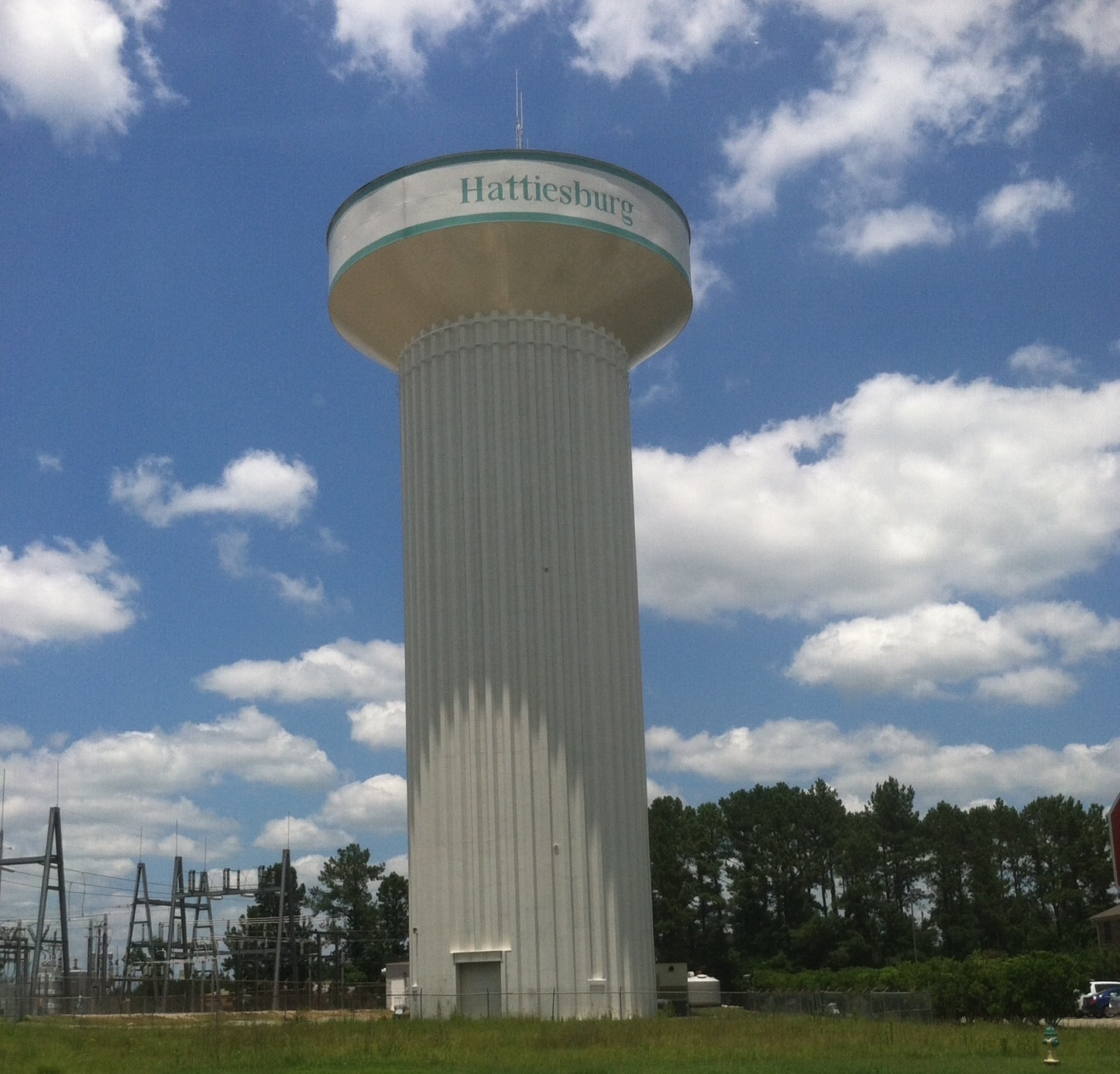
Water tower by Turtle Creek Mall

During European colonization, this area was first claimed by the French. Between 1763 and 1783 the area that is currently Hattiesburg fell under the jurisdiction of the colony of British West Florida. After the United States gained its independence, Great Britain ceded this and other areas after 1783. The United States gained a cession of lands from the Choctaw and Chickasaw under the terms of the Treaty of Mount Dexter in 1805. After the treaty was ratified, European-American settlers began to move into the area.

In the 1830s, the Choctaw and Chickasaw were relocated by United States authorities by treaties authorized by the Indian Removal Act, which sought to relocate the Five Civilized Tribes from the Southeast to west of the Mississippi River. They and their slaves were moved to Indian Territory in today's Kansas and Oklahoma.

Hattiesburg developed at the confluence of the Leaf and Bouie rivers. It was founded in 1882 by Captain William H. Hardy, a civil engineer. The city of Hattiesburg was incorporated in 1884 with a population of approximately 400. Originally called Twin Forks and later Gordonville, the city received its final name of Hattiesburg from Capt. Hardy, in honor of his wife Hattie. Hattiesburg is centrally located less than 100 miles from the state capital of Jackson, as well as from the Mississippi Gulf Coast, New Orleans, Louisiana, and Mobile, Alabama.

In 1884, a railroad—known then as the New Orleans and Northeastern—was built from Meridian, Mississippi, in the center of the state, through Hattiesburg to New Orleans. The completion of the Gulf and Ship Island Railroad (G&SIRR) from Gulfport, to the capital of Jackson, Mississippi, also ran through Hattiesburg. It stimulated a lumber boom in 1897, with interior pine forests being harvested at a rapid pace. Although the railroad took 20 years to be developed, the G&SIRR more than fulfilled its promise. It gave the state access to a deep water harbor at Gulfport, more than doubled the population of towns along its route, stimulated the growth of the City of Gulfport, and made Hattiesburg a railroad center. In 1924, the G&SIRR operated as a subsidiary of the Illinois Central Railroad but lost its independent identity in 1946.

Hattiesburg gained its nickname, the Hub City, in 1912 as a result of a contest in a local newspaper. It was named because it was at the intersection of a number of important rail lines. Later U.S. Highway 49, U.S. Highway 98 and U.S. Highway 11, and later, Interstate 59 also intersected in and near Hattiesburg.

The region around Hattiesburg was involved in testing during the development of weapons in the nuclear arms race of the Cold War. In the 1960s, two nuclear devices were detonated in the salt domes near Baxterville, Mississippi, about 30 miles southwest of Hattiesburg. Extensive follow-up of the area by the EPA has not revealed levels of nuclear contamination in the area that would be harmful to humans.

The U.S. Post Office in downtown Hattiesburg, Mississippi

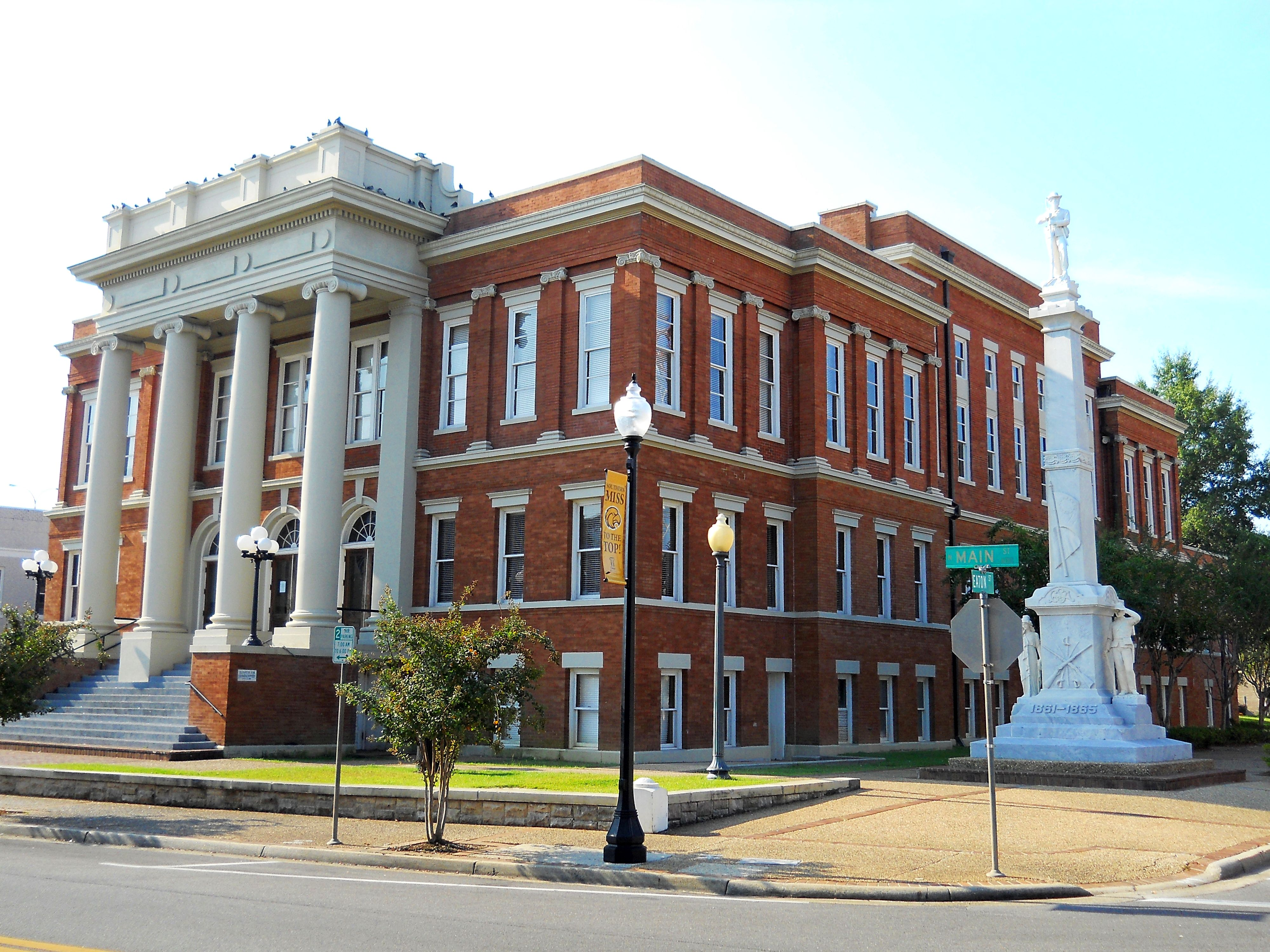
Courthouse and Confederate Monument

Throughout the 20th century, Hattiesburg benefited from the founding of Camp Shelby (now a military mobilization center), two major hospitals, and two colleges, The University of Southern Mississippi and William Carey University. The growing metropolitan area that includes Hattiesburg, Forrest and Lamar counties, was designated a Metropolitan Statistical Area in 1994 with a combined population of more than 100,000 residents.

Although about 75 miles (121 km) inland, Hattiesburg was hit very hard in 2005 by Hurricane Katrina. Around 10,000 structures in the area received major damage of some type from the heavy winds and rain, as the hurricane tracked inland. Approximately 80 percent of the city's roads were blocked by trees, and power was out in the area for up to 14 days. The storm killed 24 people in Hattiesburg and the surrounding areas. The city has struggled to cope with a large influx of temporary evacuees and new permanent residents from coastal Louisiana and Mississippi towns to the south, where damage from Katrina was catastrophic.

The City is known for its police department, as it was the first—and for almost a decade the only—Commission on Accreditation for Law Enforcement Agencies federally accredited law enforcement agency in the State of Mississippi. The department is served by its own training academy. It is considered one of the most difficult basic academies in the country, with a more than 50% attrition rate.

The Hattiesburg Zoo at Kamper Park is a longstanding tourist attraction in the city.

In 2011, the Hattiesburg Historic Neighborhood District was named one of the "Great Places In America," to live by the American Planning Association. Places are selected annually and represent the gold standard in terms of having a true sense of place, cultural and historical interest. The twenty-five-block neighborhood has one of the best collections of Victorian-era houses in Mississippi, with more than ninety percent of the houses substantially renovated and maintained. The Hattiesburg Historic Neighborhood District [HHND] was Hattiesburg's first recognized historic district and was listed on the National Register of Historic Places in 1980. It is also part of an Historic Conservation District and protected by Historic Hattiesburg Design Guidelines.

In 2013, the Hattiesburg Historic Neighborhood District celebrated the 38th Annual Victorian Candlelit Christmas and Holiday Tour of Homes. During the two nights of the Victorian Candlelit Christmas, thousands of candles burn in white bags lining the sidewalks. Christmas carolers from the three churches: Sacred Heart, Court Street Methodist, and Bay Street Presbyterian, stroll house to house singing Christmas music. Horse-drawn carriages carry visitors through the neighborhood at a walking pace.

The Miss Hospitality Pageant began in 1949. Hattiesburg was chosen in 1997 to sponsor the state pageant. The purpose of the pageant is the selection and presentation of a young, knowledgeable lady to help promote the state in tourism and economic development. Contestants are judged on the following categories: panel interview, one-on-one interview competition, Mississippi speech competition, commercial/black dress competition, and evening gown competition. The 2011 winner was Ann Claire Reynolds, a junior at the University of Southern Mississippi who was majoring in elementary and special education.

Hattiesburg is home to the African American Military History Museum. The building opened as a USO club in 1942 to serve African Americans serving at Camp Shelby, as local facilities were racially segregated. It has been listed on the National Register of Historic Places. This building is the only remaining USO club site in the United States. It has been adapted for use as a museum interpreting African-American military history. Exhibits show their participation in all the major wars and the founding of Hattiesburg: exhibits include the Revolutionary War, Buffalo Soldiers, World Wars I and II, Desegregation, Korean War, Vietnam, Desert Storm, Global War on Terrorism, You Can Be A Soldier, Hattiesburg's Hall of Honor, and World Map. The museum is dedicated to the many African-American soldiers who have fought for their country.

=== Civil rights movement ===
Hattiesburg and the unincorporated African-American community of Palmers Crossing played a key role in the civil rights transitions of the 1960s. In 1959, black Korean War veteran Clyde Kennard applied to attend then all-white Mississippi Southern College (today University of Southern Mississippi). He was denied admission because of his race, as state colleges were legally segregated. When he persisted, the newly formed Mississippi State Sovereignty Commission, a taxpayer-supported agency ostensibly set up to encourage tourism, conspired to have him framed for a crime. He was sentenced to seven years in Parchman Prison. For years, National Association for the Advancement of Colored People leaders Medgar Evers, Vernon Dahmer, and other Forrest County civil rights activists fought to overturn the conviction. The MSSC conducted outrageous activities against citizens of the state: MSSC agents investigated citizens while the organization created blacklists of activists and black professionals who were suspected of working for civil rights, conducted economic boycotts against black-owned businesses, and arranged for blacks to be fired from state and local jobs. They also worked to have Black activists or suspected activists evicted from rental housing. All of this was conducted in secret, until later allegations of revelations brought the state's activities into the open.

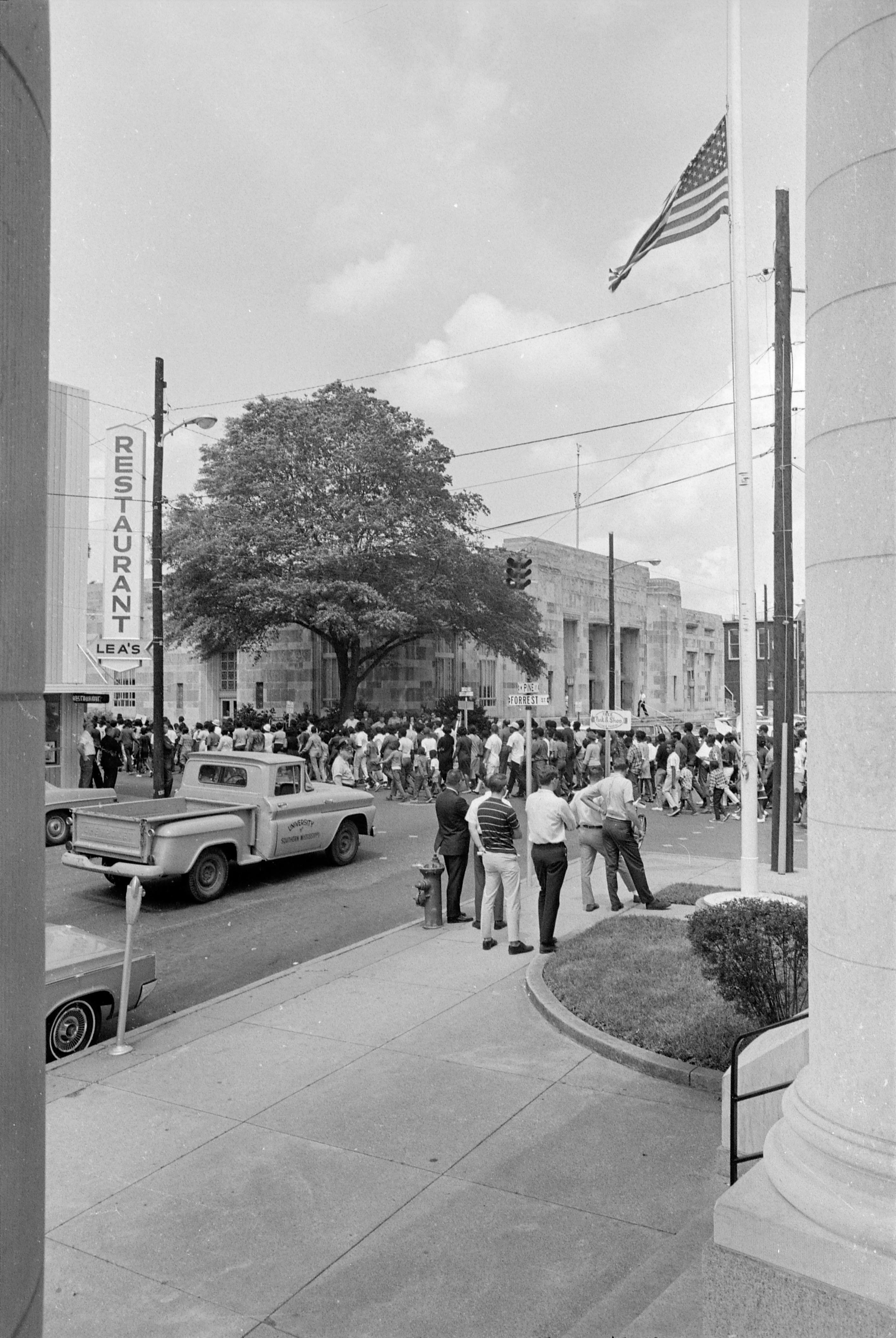
Memorial march in Hattiesburg in 1968, four days after the assassination of Martin Luther King Jr.

Forrest County Registrar Theron Lynd prevented blacks in the area from registering to vote, based on such devices in the state constitution as poll taxes, and literacy and comprehension tests, subjectively administered by whites. In 1960, thirty percent of the population in the county was black, but less than 1% of blacks had been able to register, regardless of their education level. Registration by whites was close to 100%. In 1961, the U.S. Justice Department filed suit against Lynd. He was the first southern registrar to be convicted under the Civil Rights Act of 1957 for systematically violating African-American voting rights.

In 1962, the Student Nonviolent Coordinating Committee (SNCC) began one of its first voter-registration projects in Hattiesburg under the auspices of the Council of Federated Organizations (COFO). By 1964, the Delta Ministry was active in the city. In cooperation with the NAACP and local civil rights leaders, they formed the Forrest County Voters League. In conjunction with the 1963 elections, civil rights leaders organized a statewide Freedom Ballot, a mock election that highlighted both the statewide pattern of voting rights discrimination and the strong desire of Mississippi blacks for the franchise. Despite the serious risk of both physical and economic retaliation, nearly half of Forrest County blacks participated, the highest turnout in the state.

January 22, 1964, was "Freedom Day" in Hattiesburg, a major voter registration effort supported by student demonstrators and 50 northern clergymen. For the first time since Reconstruction, an inter-racial protest successfully picketed the courthouse for voting rights without being arrested. Roughly 100 African Americans attempted to register, though only a few were allowed into the courthouse. Fewer still succeeded in gaining entry on the rolls. Each day thereafter for many months, activists resumed the courthouse protest in what became known as the "Perpetual Picket."

During Freedom Summer in 1964, the Hattiesburg/Palmers Crossing project was the headquarters for all civil rights activity in Mississippi's 5th congressional district. This was the largest and most active site in the state, with more than 90 volunteers and 3,000 local participants. Hundreds of Forrest County blacks tried to register to vote at the courthouse, but blacks once again were prevented from doing so. More than 650 children and adults attended one of the seven Freedom Schools in Hattiesburg and Palmers Crossing, three freedom libraries were set up with donated books, and a community center was established. Many whites opposed civil rights efforts by blacks, and both summer volunteers and local African Americans endured arrests, beatings, firings, and evictions.

Forrest County was also a center of activity for the Mississippi Freedom Democratic Party (MFDP). It sent a slate of delegates to the National Democratic Convention in Atlantic City that year to challenge the seating of the all-white, pro-segregation delegates elected by the regular party in primaries from which African Americans had been largely excluded due to voter registration barriers. Victoria Jackson Gray of Palmers Crossing ran on the MFDP ticket against incumbent Senator John Stennis, and John Cameron of Hattiesburg ran for Representative in the 5th District. With few blacks having successfully been able to register to vote, these candidates did not have a realistic chance of victory. Nonetheless, their campaigns helped to encourage the further enfranchisement and political agency of black citizens.

Even after passage of the federal Civil Rights Act of 1964 and the Voting Rights Act of 1965, white resistance continued in Mississippi and Hattiesburg. On the night of January 10, 1966, the White Knights of the Ku Klux Klan attacked the Hattiesburg home of NAACP leader Vernon Dahmer with firebombs and gunfire. Dahmer was the most prominent black leader in the county and had been the primary civil rights leader for many years. Just prior to the attack, he had announced that he would help pay a $2 poll tax (equivalent to $20 in 2025) for black voters too poor to do so themselves. Dahmer held off the Klan with his rifle to give his wife, their three young children, and elderly aunt time to escape their burning home, but he died of burns and smoke inhalation the next day. His murder sparked large protest marches in Hattiesburg. A number of Klansmen were arrested for the crime, and four were eventually convicted. After four previous trials had ended in deadlocks, KKK Imperial Wizard Samuel Bowers was finally convicted in August 1998 for ordering the assassination of Dahmer. He was sentenced to life in prison.

In 1970, the U.S. Supreme Court ruled against trespass convictions of civil rights protesters in Adickes v. S.H. Kress Co.. The case involved a sit-in at the lunch counter of the S. H. Kress & Co. downtown.

== Geography ==
Most of Hattiesburg is in Forrest County. A smaller portion on the west side is in Lamar County, with abundant commercial land gained in a 2008 annexation. This consists of a narrow stretch of land east of I-59 and an irregularly shaped extension into West Hattiesburg. In the 2000 census, 42,475 of the city's 44,779 residents (94.9%) lived in Forrest County and 2,304 (5.1%) in Lamar County.

According to the United States Census Bureau, the city has an area of 54.3 square miles (140.6 km^{2}), of which 53.4 square miles (138.3 km^{2}) is land and 0.89 square miles (2.3 km^{2}), or 1.63%, is water.

Hattiesburg is 74 miles (119 km) north of Biloxi and 90 miles (140 km) southeast of Jackson, the state capital.

=== Geology and paleontology ===
Hattiesburg is on an outcrop of the Pascagoula and Hattiesburg formation that is thought to be Miocene in age. Miocene plant and animal fossils discovered in Hattiesburg's vicinity indicate the area was once more swamp-like and dominated by low-growing palm trees.

=== Climate ===
Hattiesburg has a humid subtropical climate, with short, mild winters and hot, humid summers. Snowfall is extremely rare, but on December 11, 2008, areas around Hattiesburg received 3 to 5 inches (0.076 to 0.127 m). As is the case throughout the southern United States, severe thunderstorms can pose a threat, particularly during spring. Such storms spawn frequent lightning, heavy rain, occasional large hail, and tornadoes. An EF4 tornado struck the Hattiesburg area on February 10, 2013, between roughly 5:00 p.m. and 5:30 p.m. CST. It formed in Lamar County just west of Oak Grove and quickly increased in size and intensity. Although the most severe damage occurred in the Oak Grove area, especially near Oak Grove High School, the tornado continued eastward into Hattiesburg, causing widespread EF1-EF3 damage to the southern portion of the University of Southern Mississippi campus and the areas just north of downtown. It then moved into neighboring Petal and rural Forrest County. More than 80 injured were reported but no fatalities. The prevention of deaths was attributed to the nearly 30-minute lead time of the tornado warning. The most recent tornado struck on January 21, 2017, when an EF3 hit the city early in the morning, killing four and injuring 20. Some 10,000 people were left without power.

Climate data for Hattiesburg, Mississippi (1991–2020 normals, extremes 1893–present)
| Month | Jan | Feb | Mar | Apr | May | Jun | Jul | Aug | Sep | Oct | Nov | Dec | Year |
|---|---|---|---|---|---|---|---|---|---|---|---|---|---|
| Record high °F (°C) | 87 (31) | 88 (31) | 99 (37) | 94 (34) | 104 (40) | 106 (41) | 105 (41) | 107 (42) | 103 (39) | 106 (41) | 92 (33) | 90 (32) | 106 (41) |
| Mean maximum °F (°C) | 76.3 (24.6) | 79.4 (26.3) | 84.6 (29.2) | 87.6 (30.9) | 92.5 (33.6) | 96.2 (35.7) | 97.8 (36.6) | 97.7 (36.5) | 95.3 (35.2) | 90.3 (32.4) | 83.1 (28.4) | 78.4 (25.8) | 99.2 (37.3) |
| Mean daily maximum °F (°C) | 59.7 (15.4) | 64.0 (17.8) | 71.1 (21.7) | 77.5 (25.3) | 84.2 (29.0) | 89.7 (32.1) | 91.2 (32.9) | 91.4 (33.0) | 87.9 (31.1) | 79.4 (26.3) | 69.3 (20.7) | 61.8 (16.6) | 77.3 (25.2) |
| Daily mean °F (°C) | 48.8 (9.3) | 52.6 (11.4) | 59.5 (15.3) | 65.8 (18.8) | 73.3 (22.9) | 79.6 (26.4) | 81.5 (27.5) | 81.4 (27.4) | 77.4 (25.2) | 67.7 (19.8) | 57.5 (14.2) | 51.1 (10.6) | 66.4 (19.1) |
| Mean daily minimum °F (°C) | 37.8 (3.2) | 41.2 (5.1) | 47.9 (8.8) | 54.1 (12.3) | 62.4 (16.9) | 69.5 (20.8) | 71.8 (22.1) | 71.5 (21.9) | 66.9 (19.4) | 56.0 (13.3) | 45.7 (7.6) | 40.3 (4.6) | 55.4 (13.0) |
| Mean minimum °F (°C) | 21.3 (−5.9) | 25.6 (−3.6) | 29.8 (−1.2) | 37.5 (3.1) | 47.7 (8.7) | 61.2 (16.2) | 66.6 (19.2) | 64.9 (18.3) | 53.8 (12.1) | 37.8 (3.2) | 28.6 (−1.9) | 25.0 (−3.9) | 19.5 (−6.9) |
| Record low °F (°C) | 4 (−16) | −1 (−18) | 17 (−8) | 29 (−2) | 38 (3) | 49 (9) | 55 (13) | 55 (13) | 40 (4) | 23 (−5) | 18 (−8) | 4 (−16) | −1 (−18) |
| Average precipitation inches (mm) | 6.50 (165) | 5.68 (144) | 5.89 (150) | 5.70 (145) | 4.53 (115) | 5.26 (134) | 6.44 (164) | 6.26 (159) | 4.82 (122) | 3.54 (90) | 3.85 (98) | 5.97 (152) | 64.44 (1,638) |
| Average snowfall inches (cm) | 0.2 (0.51) | 0.1 (0.25) | 0.1 (0.25) | 0.0 (0.0) | 0.0 (0.0) | 0.0 (0.0) | 0.0 (0.0) | 0.0 (0.0) | 0.0 (0.0) | 0.0 (0.0) | 0.0 (0.0) | 0.5 (1.3) | 0.9 (2.31) |
| Average precipitation days (≥ 0.01 in) | 11.4 | 10.6 | 9.4 | 8.0 | 8.7 | 11.3 | 13.1 | 11.1 | 8.6 | 6.4 | 7.4 | 10.2 | 116.2 |
| Average snowy days (≥ 0.1 in) | 0.1 | 0.1 | 0.0 | 0.0 | 0.0 | 0.0 | 0.0 | 0.0 | 0.0 | 0.0 | 0.0 | 0.2 | 0.4 |
Source 1: NOAA
Source 2: National Weather Service

== Demographics ==
Historical population
| Census | Pop. | Note | %± |
|---|---|---|---|
| 1890 | 1,172 | | — |
| 1900 | 4,175 | | 256.2% |
| 1910 | 11,733 | | 181.0% |
| 1920 | 13,270 | | 13.1% |
| 1930 | 18,601 | | 40.2% |
| 1940 | 21,026 | | 13.0% |
| 1950 | 29,474 | | 40.2% |
| 1960 | 34,989 | | 18.7% |
| 1970 | 39,648 | | 13.3% |
| 1980 | 40,829 | | 3.0% |
| 1990 | 41,882 | | 2.6% |
| 2000 | 44,779 | | 6.9% |
| 2010 | 45,989 | | 2.7% |
| 2020 | 48,730 | | 6.0% |
U.S. Decennial Census

=== Racial and ethnic composition ===
Hattiesburg city, Mississippi – Racial and ethnic composition Note: the US Census treats Hispanic/Latino as an ethnic category. This table excludes Latinos from the racial categories and assigns them to a separate category. Hispanics/Latinos may be of any race.
| Race / Ethnicity (NH = Non-Hispanic) | 2020 | 2010 | 2000 | 1990 | 1980 |
|---|---|---|---|---|---|
| White alone (NH) | 39.3% (19,172) | 40.5% (18,615) | 49.3% (22,060) | 57.5% (24,094) | 63.4% (25,877) |
| Black alone (NH) | 50.9% (24,804) | 52.8% (24,282) | 47.1% (21,099) | 40.3% (16,889) | 34% (13,896) |
| American Indian alone (NH) | 0.2% (89) | 0.2% (85) | 0.1% (64) | 0.1% (46) | 0.1% (37) |
| Asian alone (NH) | 1.7% (830) | 0.9% (431) | 1.2% (545) | 1% (436) | 0.7% (302) |
| Pacific Islander alone (NH) | 0.1% (28) | 0% (18) | 0% (9) | | |
| Other race alone (NH) | 0.6% (284) | 0.1% (56) | 0.1% (49) | 0% (8) | 0% (20) |
| Multiracial (NH) | 2.6% (1,268) | 1.1% (506) | 0.7% (323) | — | — |
| Hispanic/Latino (any race) | 4.6% (2,255) | 4.3% (1,996) | 1.4% (630) | 1% (409) | 1.7% (697) |

=== 2020 census ===
As of the 2020 census, Hattiesburg had a population of 48,730. The median age was 29.4 years. 18.2% of residents were under the age of 18 and 13.3% of residents were 65 years of age or older. For every 100 females there were 85.5 males, and for every 100 females age 18 and over there were 82.1 males age 18 and over.

95.6% of residents lived in urban areas, while 4.4% lived in rural areas.

There were 19,898 households and 9,165 families in Hattiesburg, of which 24.6% had children under the age of 18 living in them. Of all households, 24.1% were married-couple households, 25.7% were households with a male householder and no spouse or partner present, and 42.1% were households with a female householder and no spouse or partner present. About 39.8% of all households were made up of individuals and 11.1% had someone living alone who was 65 years of age or older.

There were 22,620 housing units, of which 12.0% were vacant. The homeowner vacancy rate was 2.3% and the rental vacancy rate was 8.7%.

Racial composition as of the 2020 census
| Race | Number | Percent |
|---|---|---|
| White | 19,494 | 40.0% |
| Black or African American | 24,962 | 51.2% |
| American Indian and Alaska Native | 112 | 0.2% |
| Asian | 836 | 1.7% |
| Native Hawaiian and Other Pacific Islander | 28 | 0.1% |
| Some other race | 1,577 | 3.2% |
| Two or more races | 1,721 | 3.5% |
| Hispanic or Latino (of any race) | 2,255 | 4.6% |

=== 2000 census ===
As of the 2000 census, there were 44,779 people, 17,295 households, and 9,391 families residing within the city limits.

=== Religion ===
In 2010 the Hattiesburg Metropolitan area has an Evangelical Protestant majority with 66,000 members. The Southern Baptist Convention had 85 congregations and 53,000 members. The United Methodist Church had 35 congregations and 9,000 members. The third largest was the Presbyterian Church in America with 5 congregations and 1,518 members.

== Economy ==
Hattiesburg is home to several national business branches that hold thousands of jobs across the Pine Belt. It was headquarters to the now defunct International Filing Company and currently hosts branches of Kohler Engines and BAE Systems Inc., as well as Berry Plastics and the Coca-Cola Bottling Company United, Pepsi Cola Bottling Co., and Budweiser Distribution Co. Companies such as Sunbeam (shared with Mr. Coffee, and the Coleman Company) and Kimberly Clark used to manufacture in Hattiesburg.

Regions Financial Corporation operates a large operations center in the city, which employs nearly 500 people. Jones Capital recently celebrated the groundbreaking of their new $50 million corporate headquarters facility in Midtown Hattiesburg across from The University of Southern Mississippi. Jones operates globally with over 1,000 employees in total, 500 of those are employed in the State of MS. The new headquarters facility will serve as the primary office for over 300 MS-based employees.

The main shopping mall is Turtle Creek Mall.

== Arts and culture ==
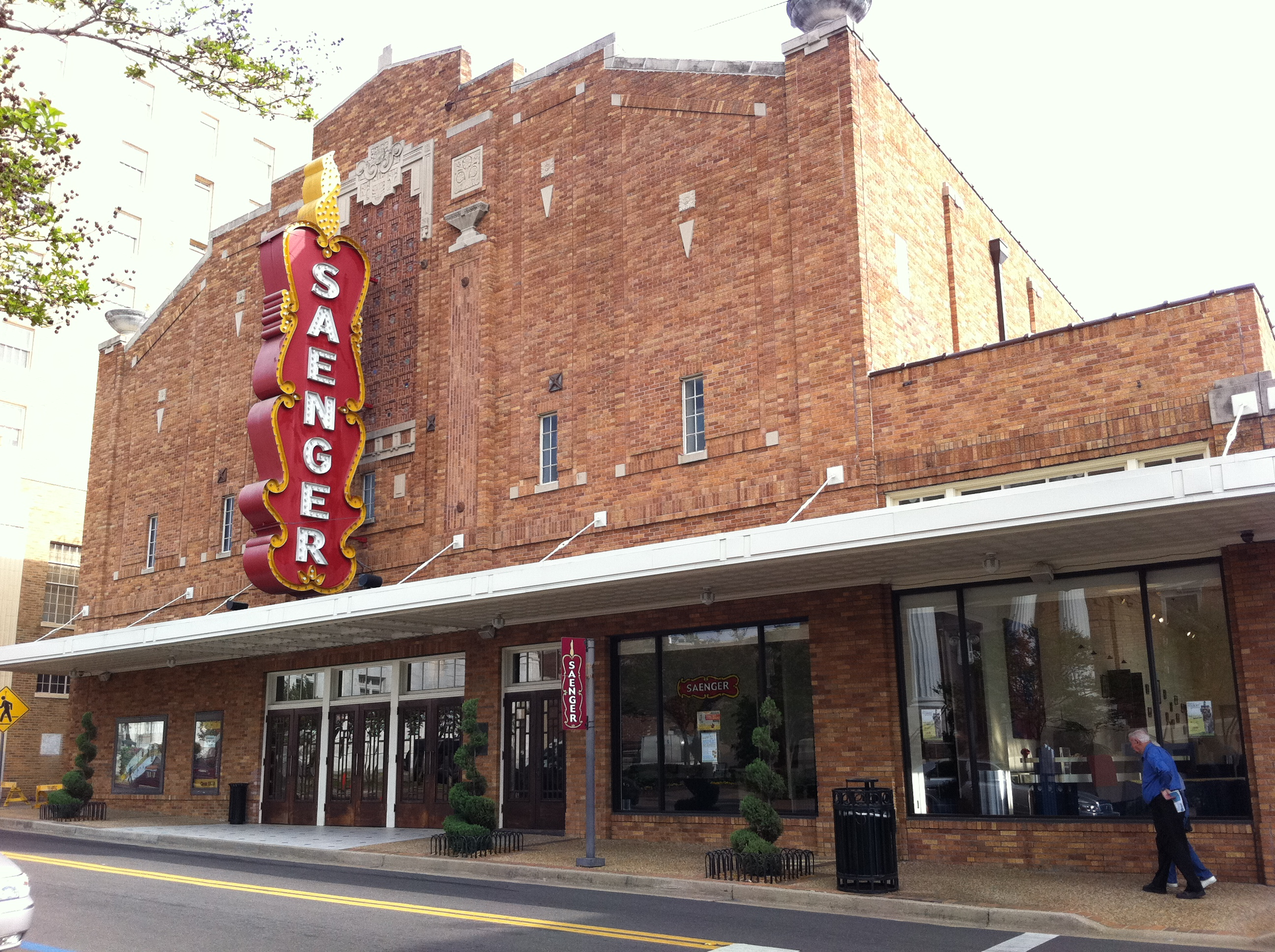
Saenger Theatre

=== Theaters ===
- The Saenger Theatre was one of the seven built and operated by the Saenger brothers. It hosts an annual Mississippi Miss Hospitality Competition, along with other productions. It is listed on the National Register of Historic Places.
- William Carey Center and Dinner Theater
- University of Southern Mississippi Theatre Department features original productions and broadcasts of National Theatre Live! from London, UK.

=== Galleries ===
- A Gallery, 134 E. Front Street
- Hattiesburg Arts Council Gallery at the Hattiesburg Cultural Center, 723 Main Street
- Lucile Parker Art Gallery is located in the Thomas Fine Arts Building on William Carey University's Hattiesburg campus. The collection consists of 141 artworks by Lucile Parker, and 17 by Marie Hull. From August to May, the gallery features exhibitions of local, state, and nationally known artists.
- Sarah Gillespie Collection at William Carey University, 498 Tuscan Avenue, is an extensive collection of twentieth century Mississippi art.
- University of Southern Mississippi Art Gallery

=== Museums ===
- African American Military History Museum, 305 E. 6th Street
- Mississippi Armed Forces Museum at Camp Shelby
- Freedom Summer Trails
- Hattiesburg Area Historical Society Museum, 723 Main Street
- De Grummond Children's Literature Museum
- Hattiesburg Pocket Museum, 119 W Front St

=== Train depot ===
The Hattiesburg Train Depot was constructed in 1910 by the Southern Railway Company, and was the city's largest and most architecturally significant depot. The City of Hattiesburg purchased the depot and 3.2 acres (1.3 ha) of land from Norfolk Southern Railway in 2000, and began a seven-year, $10 million restoration. The completed depot now functions as an intermodal transportation center for bus, taxi and rail, as well as a space for exhibitions, meetings and special events.

== Government ==
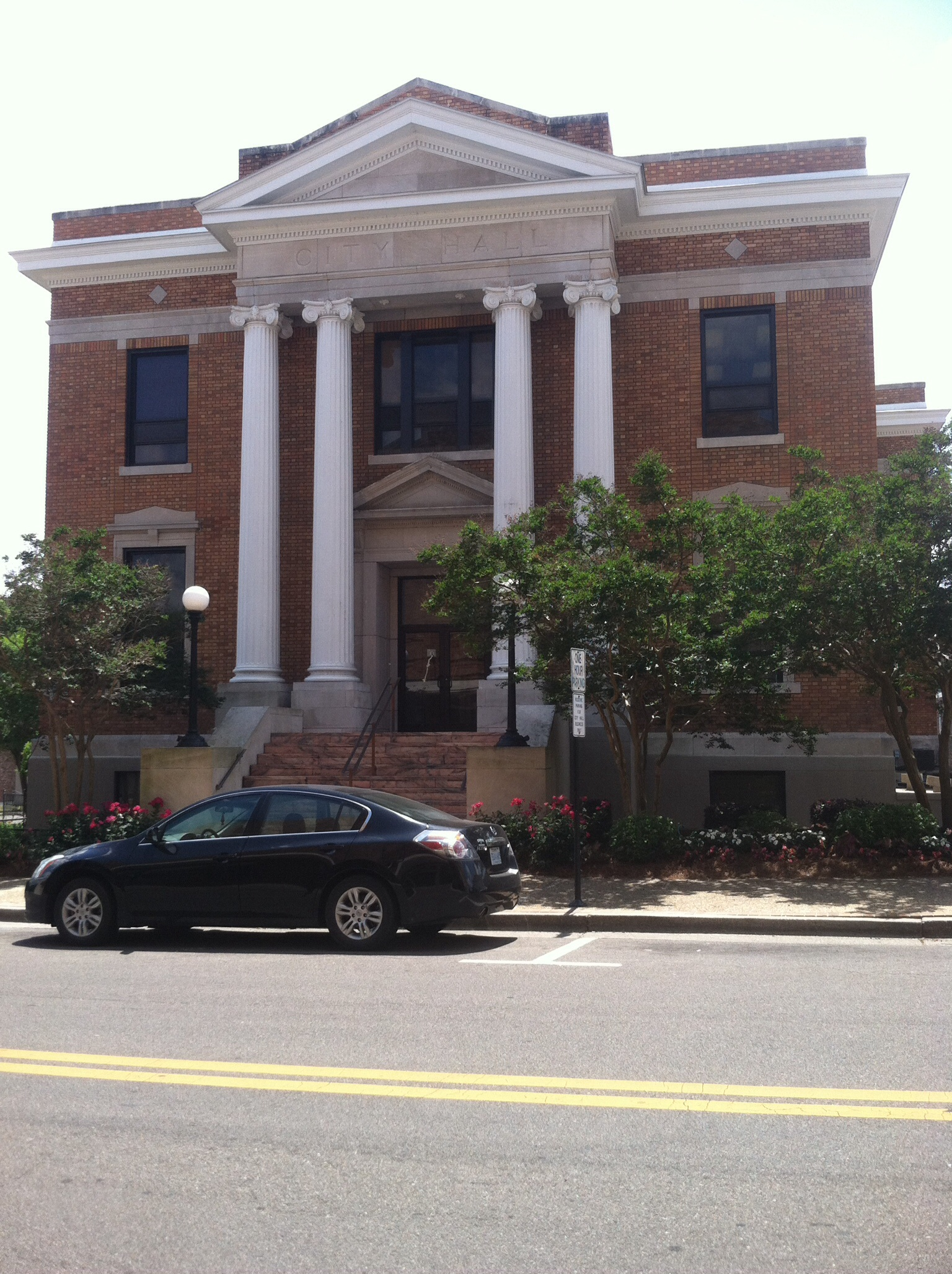
Hattiesburg City Hall

=== Local Government ===
Hattiesburg is governed via a mayor-council system. The mayor is elected at large citywide. The city council consists of five members who are each elected from one of five wards, known as single-member districts.

Various powers rest according to the City charter and the Mayor-Council Form of government outline directed by Mississippi law in the city of Hattiesburg. The mayor can appoint heads of city municipal agencies, with approval from the city council, create new agencies if their orders are not vetoed or overturned by the city council, and can hire and fire city contractors.

Hattiesburg's current mayor is Toby Barker of the Independent, who was elected on June 7, 2017.

Hattiesburg's current city council members are:

| District | Name | Party |
|---|---|---|
| Ward 1 | Jeffrey George | Rep |
| Ward 2 | Eric Boney | Dem |
| Ward 3 | LeeAnn Vance | Rep |
| Ward 4 | Dave Ware | Rep |
| Ward 5 | Nick Brown | Dem |

=== State Government ===
The Mississippi Department Of Corrections (MDOC) operates the Hattiesburg Probation & Parole Office in Hattiesburg. The MDOC South Mississippi Correctional Institution, in unincorporated Greene County, is located in approximately 30 miles east in Hattiesburg, 90 miles southeast in Memphis, northwest in Jackson, and south in Gulfport.

=== Federal Government ===
The entire city of Hattiesburg is part of Mississippi's 4th congressional district. U.S. Representative Mike Ezell, a Republican, has served since 2023. He has been Chairman of the Subcommittee on Coast Guard and Maritime Transportation and a member of the Committee on Transportation and Infrastructure since 2023.

The United States Postal Service operates the Hattiesburg Main Post Office and several smaller post offices.

== Education ==
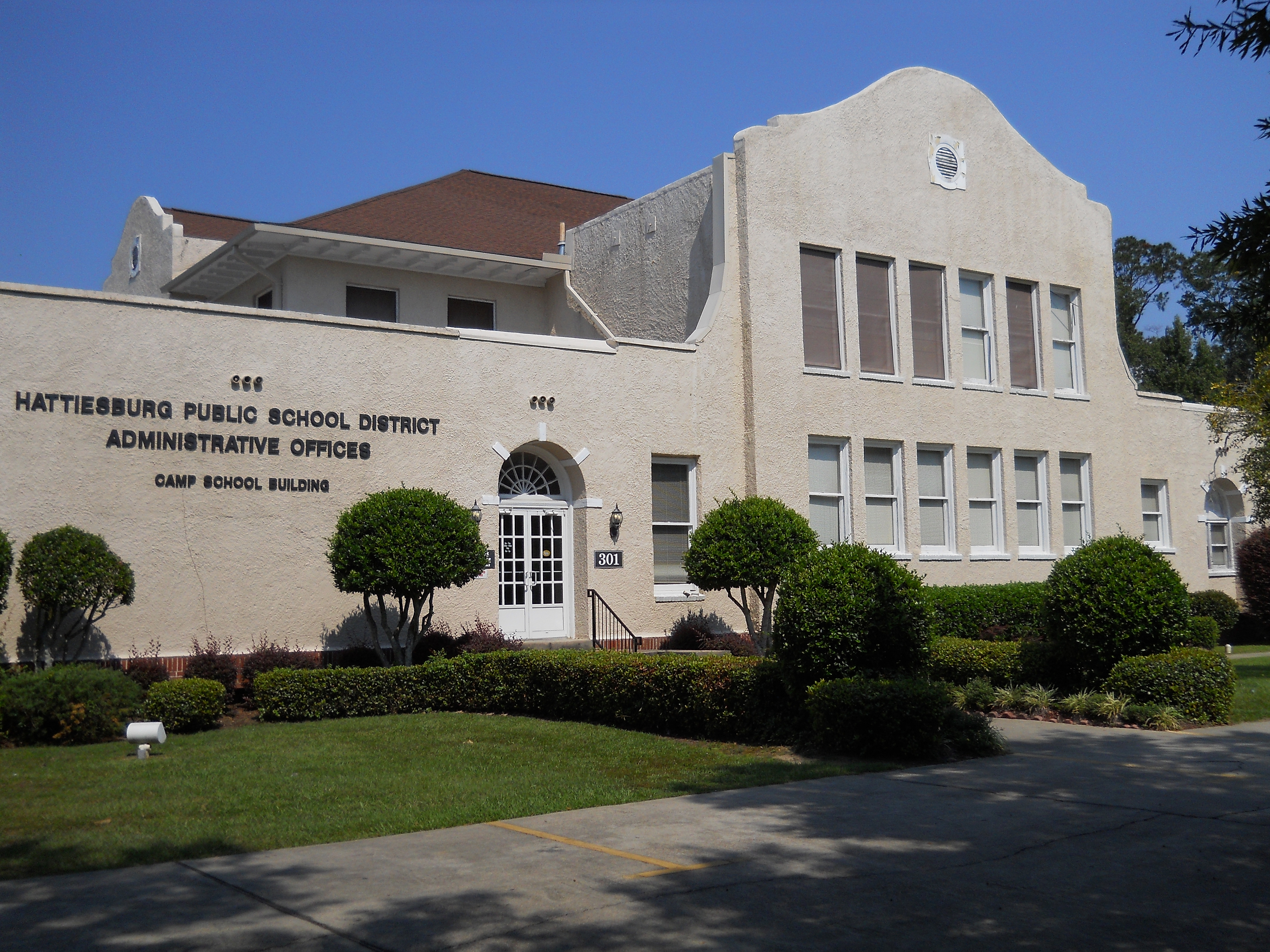
Camp School Building, Hattiesburg Municipal Separate School District headquarters

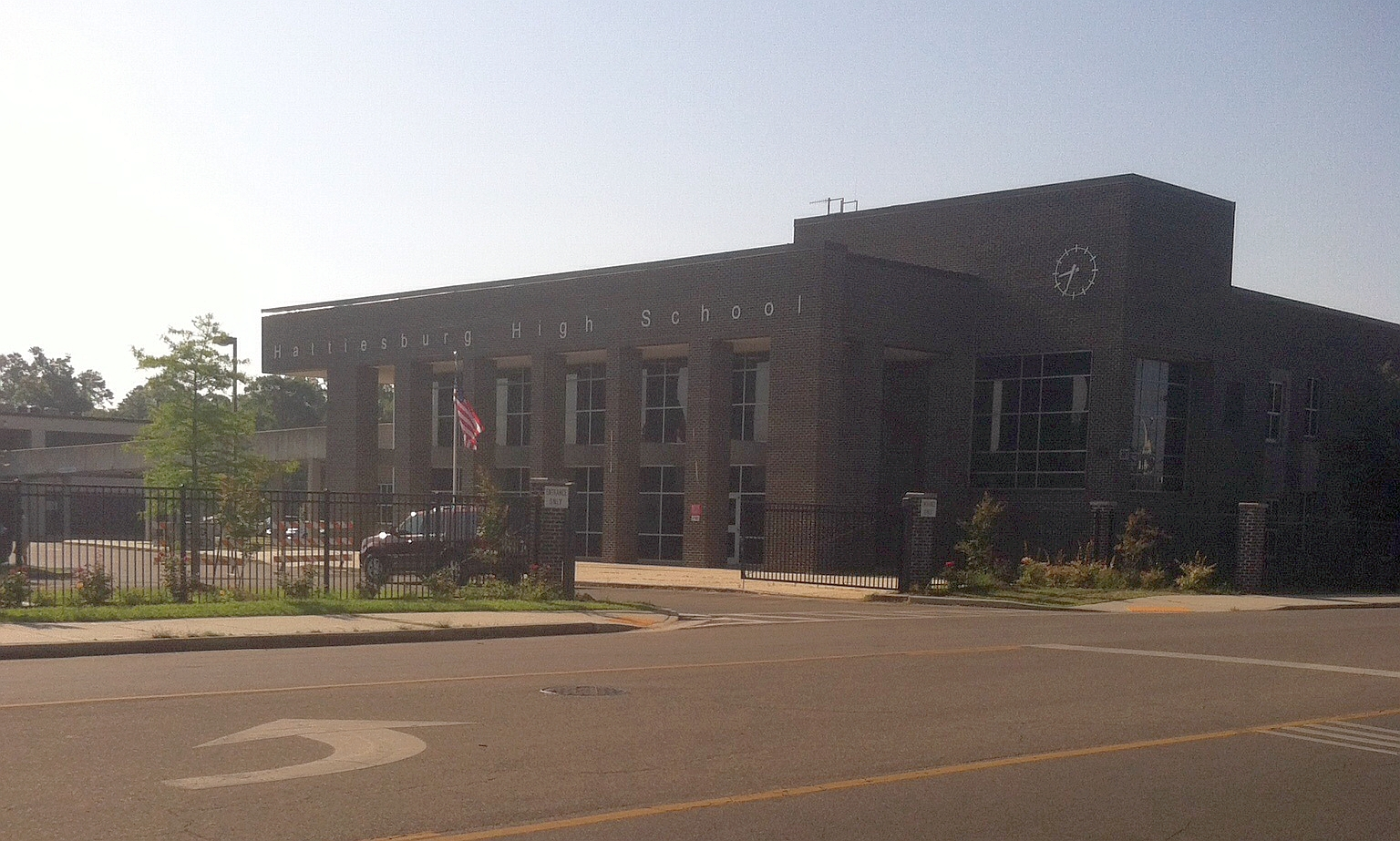
Hattiesburg High School

=== Colleges and universities ===
Hattiesburg is home to the main campuses of two institutions of higher learning: the public University of Southern Mississippi and the private Baptist-supported William Carey University. Both have campuses in other locations; the former has a campus in Long Beach, Mississippi, and William Carey has campuses in Biloxi, and Baton Rouge, Louisiana. The Forrest County Center of Pearl River Community College, a public institution, is located in Hattiesburg, with the main campus located in Poplarville, Mississippi.

=== K-12 schools ===
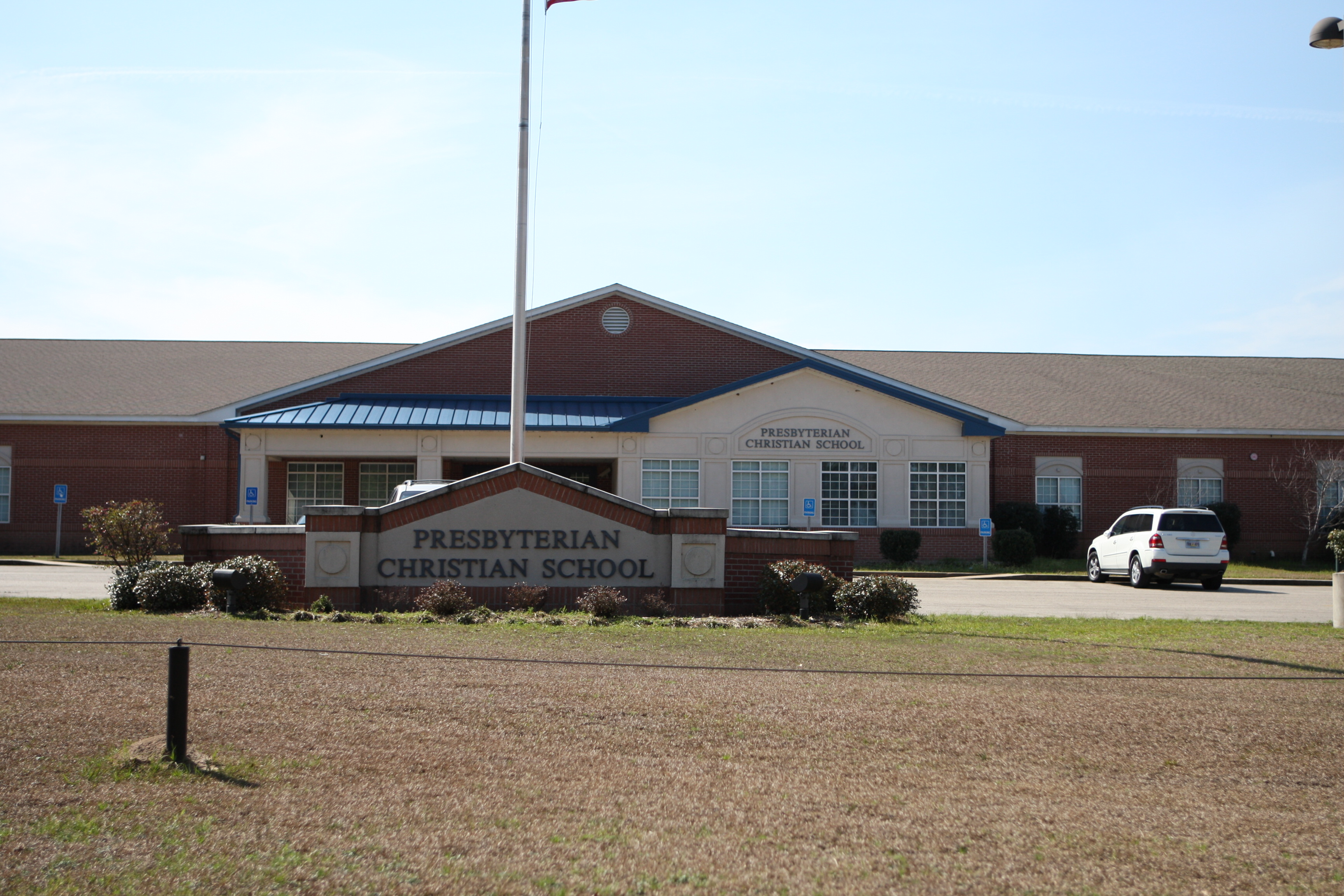
Presbyterian Christian School secondary school

Public education in most of Hattiesburg is served by the Hattiesburg Municipal Separate School District, serving grades K–12. Portions of Hattiesburg are served by Forrest County Schools. Portions of Hattiesburg in Lamar County are zoned to Lamar County School District.

Hattiesburg High School is a part of the Hattiesburg district. North Forrest High School (grades 7–12) is a part of the Forrest school district. Oak Grove High School (grades 9–12) is under the Lamar County School District.

Forrest County Agricultural High School is an independent public high school near Hattiesburg.

Private schools include

- Sacred Heart Catholic School (grades Pre-K–12)
- Presbyterian Christian School (grades PreK–12)
- School of Excellence (grades K–6) (now Early Learning Center, 6 weeks to Pre-K)
- Lamar Christian School (grades Pre-K-12)
- Bass Christian Elementary (grades K–8)
- Bass Memorial Academy (grades 9–12)
- Central Baptist School (grades K–12)
- Benedict Day School (grades K–8)
- Innova Prep (grades K-12)
- The Adept School

=== Libraries ===
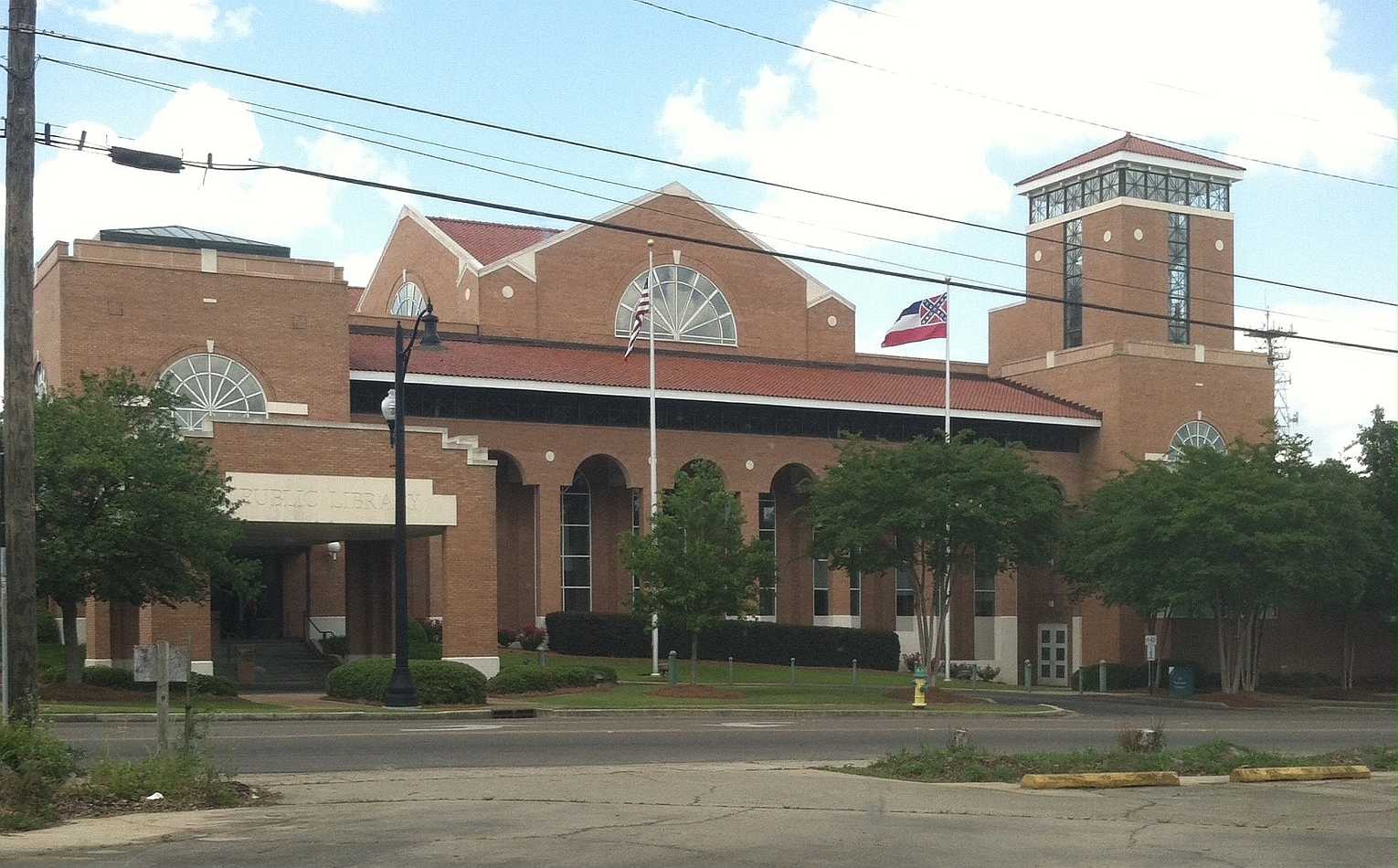
Forrest County Public Library

Forrest County Public Library serves the city. The library has a location in downtown Hattiesburg as well as in neighboring Petal.

== Media ==
=== FM radio ===
- WUSM-FM 88.5 (Public Radio)
- WAII 89.3 American Family Radio (Christian Contemporary)
- WMAH-FM 90.3 (NPR)
- WJMG 92.1 (Urban Contemporary)
- W224DP 92.7 (Fox Sports Radio) (Simulcast of WFOR AM 1400)
- WGDQ 93.1 (Urban Gospel)
- WKZW 94.3 (Hot Adult Contemporary)
- WZNF 95.3 (Pop music), (Top 40)
- WBBN 95.9 (Country music)
- WBBL 96.5 (Southern Gospel)
- WFMM 97.3 Supertalk Mississippi (News/Talk)
- W249AO 97.7 (Rhythmic Oldies)
- WLAU 99.3 Supertalk Mississippi (News/Talk)
- WNSL 100.3 (Pop music), (Top 40)
- W266CT 101.1 (Classic Hip Hop), (Urban Oldies), (Blues) (Simulcast of WHJA AM 890)
- WJKX 102.5 (Urban Adult Contemporary)
- WLVZ 103.7 (Christian Contemporary)
- WXRR 104.5 (Classic rock)
- WQID-LP 105.3 (Urban Contemporary)
- W290DQ 105.9 (News/Talk) (Simulcast of WHSY AM 950)
- WZLD 106.3 (Urban Contemporary)
- WMXI 107.1 (News/Talk)
- WZKX 107.9 (Country music)

=== AM radio ===
- WHJA 890 (Classic Hip Hop), (Urban Oldies), (Blues)
- WHSY 950 (News/Talk)
- WFOR 1400 (Fox Sports Radio)
- WORV 1580 (Gospel Music)

=== Television ===
- WDAM Channel 7 (NBC) (ABC)
- WHLT Channel 22 (CBS) (The CW)
- WHPM-LD Channel 23 (Fox)

=== Newspapers ===
- Hattiesburg American, Hattiesburg's thrice weekly newspaper, a Gannett paper
- The Hattiesburg Post, a locally owned, independent weekly paper
- The Lamar Times, a weekly community newspaper serving the residents of West Hattiesburg and Lamar County

== Infrastructure ==
=== Transportation ===
==== Rail ====
Amtrak's Crescent train connects Hattiesburg with the cities of New York, Philadelphia, Baltimore, Washington, Charlotte, Atlanta, Birmingham and New Orleans. The Amtrak station is located at 308 Newman Street.

Rail freight service is offered by three Class I railroads: CN to Jackson and Mobile, Kansas City Southern to Gulfport, and Norfolk Southern to Meridian and New Orleans.

==== Mass transit ====
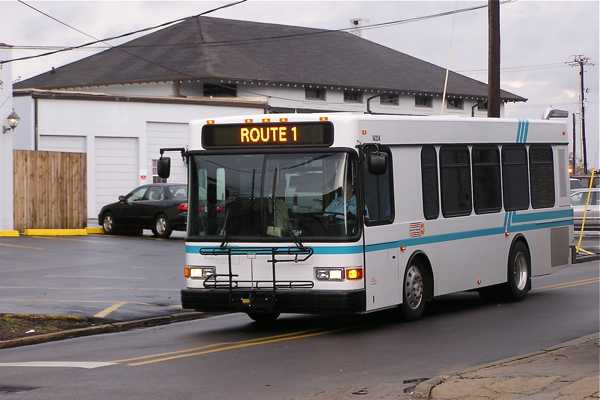
Hub City Transit bus

Hattiesburg owns and operates the city's mass transit service, HCT, Hub City Transit. HCT offers daily routes to many major thoroughfares. The Intermodal Depot downtown services Amtrak as well as the city transit services. Due to recent growth in passenger transport in the city, HCT is currently planning additional routes and services, including bus service to the suburbs of Oak Grove and Petal.

==== Air ====
Hattiesburg-Laurel Regional Airport is located in an unincorporated area in Jones County, near Moselle. It offers daily flights from Hattiesburg to Houston. The airport also has a business park located on the premises.

The city of Hattiesburg maintains the Hattiesburg Bobby L. Chain Municipal Airport (HBG) in the Hattiesburg/Forrest County Industrial Park. Located four miles south of the city center, the municipal airport provides business and general aviation services for much of South Mississippi.

==== Highways ====
- I-59
- US 11
- US 49
- US 98
- MS 24
- MS 42
- MS 198
- MS 589

==== Major local routes ====
Major east-west roads include: 4th Street, Hardy Street/ US Route 98, Oak Grove Road, Lincoln Road, Classic Drive, 7th Street, and Old MS Highway 42.

Major north-south roads include: Interstate 59, US Route 49, US Route 11/Broadway Drive/Veterans Memorial, West Pine Street, Main Street, 28th Avenue, Golden Eagle Avenue, 38th Avenue, 40th Avenue, Westover, Weathersby Road, and King Road/Old Highway 11.

== Notable people ==
- Victoria Jackson Gray Adams, educator and civil rights leader
- Fred Armisen, actor, comedian and musician, star of Portlandia
- Cora Webb Bass, educator and officer in Women's Army Corps
- Steven Barthelme, writer and critic
- Wally Berg, first American mountaineer to summit Lhotse, in 1990
- Raylawni Branch, civil rights activist and nurse educator
- Roger Brent, biologist
- Jesse L. Brown, first African-American naval aviator to complete the basic flight training program in the United States Navy
- Mary Ryan Brown, comedian and internet personality
- Shelby Cannon, tennis player
- Paul Ott Carruth, NFL player
- Robert Carson, pitcher for New York Mets
- John Prentiss Carter, lieutenant governor of Mississippi (1904–1908)
- Lewis Elliott Chaze, journalist and author of 10 novels
- Shea Curry, actress
- Vernon Dahmer, civil rights leader killed in Hattiesburg by Klansmen in 1966
- Tyler Dickerson, singer
- Adam Doleac, singer
- Miles Doleac, American actor, director, writer and producer
- Brian Dozier, MLB infielder, 2019 World Series champion
- Bob Dudley, BP executive in charge of Deepwater Horizon oil spill
- Ernest Duff (1931–2016), businessman, lawyer and Mormon bishop
- Wesley Eure, actor in Days of Our Lives and Land of the Lost
- Woody Evans, writer and librarian
- Barbara Ferrell, Olympic gold and silver medalist in National Track and Field Hall of Fame
- Tim Floyd, basketball coach, University of Texas at El Paso, Iowa State, USC, Chicago Bulls
- Joseph Edgar Foreman, (better known by his stage name Afroman), an American rapper, singer, songwriter, comedian and musician
- Joey Gathright, MLB outfielder 2004–2011
- Naomi Gray, first female Vice President of Planned Parenthood
- Todd Grisham, ESPN anchor, former WWE announcer
- Gary Grubbs, actor
- Ray Guy, Oakland Raiders punter in College and Pro Football Hall of Fame
- Charlie Hayes, MLB infielder, 1996 World Series champion
- Melinda Haynes, novelist
- Eddie Hodges, actor and singer
- Lillie Maie Hubbard, foreign service officer from 1922 to 1961
- Clifton Hyde, musician and member of Blue Man Group
- Harold Jackson, NFL wide receiver, 5-time Pro Bowl selection
- Fred Lewis, outfielder for Hiroshima Toyo Carp
- Louis Lipps, NFL Pro Bowl wide receiver, 1984 AFC Rookie of the Year, Pittsburgh Steelers
- Hank Lott, Republican state representative; born in Hattiesburg in 1974
- Jack Lucas, youngest Marine to receive Medal of Honor
- Danny Manning, basketball player, NCAA champion for Kansas, 1st selection of 1988 NBA draft, Olympic medalist, 2-time NBA All-Star
- Walter E. Massey, president of Morehouse College, director of National Science Foundation under George Bush, president of Art Institute of Chicago
- Oseola McCarty, benefactor and winner of Presidential Citizens Medal
- Matt Miller, professional baseball player
- Mississippi Matilda, Delta blues singer and songwriter who, in 1936, recorded four songs for Bluebird Records
- Picasso Nelson, football player
- Nick Panella, founder and lead singer of MSPAINT
- Jonathan Papelbon, Major League Baseball pitcher, 6-time All-Star
- Van Dyke Parks, musician, songwriter, record producer, actor
- Jamal Peters, professional Canadian football defensive back for the Toronto Argonauts of the Canadian Football League (CFL).
- Patrik-Ian Polk, film director, writer, and producer
- Todd Pinkston, NFL player for Philadelphia Eagles
- Johnny Rawls, soul blues singer and guitarist
- Purvis Short, NBA player
- Taylor Spreitler, actress
- Robert L. Stewart, NASA astronaut
- Walter Suggs, professional football player, Houston Oilers
- James Wheaton, actor, director, educator (resident infancy to age 12)
- Webb Wilder, musician and actor
- Iola Williams, politician and activist, first African-American member of the San Jose City Council, founder and former executive director the African American Military History Museum
- Amos Wilson, author and activist
- Henry Winston, Chairman of the American Communist Party (1966-1986) and Marxist civil rights activist
- Craig Wiseman, songwriter
- Brianna Wu, video game developer and computer programmer
- Walter H. Yates, Jr., major general, U.S. Army
- Walter Young, professional baseball player

== See also ==
- Eureka School (Hattiesburg, Mississippi)
- Forrest County Multipurpose Center
- Old Hattiesburg High School
- Pat Harrison Waterway District
