= Presbyterian Christian School =

Christian school in Hattiesburg, Mississippi, United States

Presbyterian Christian High School
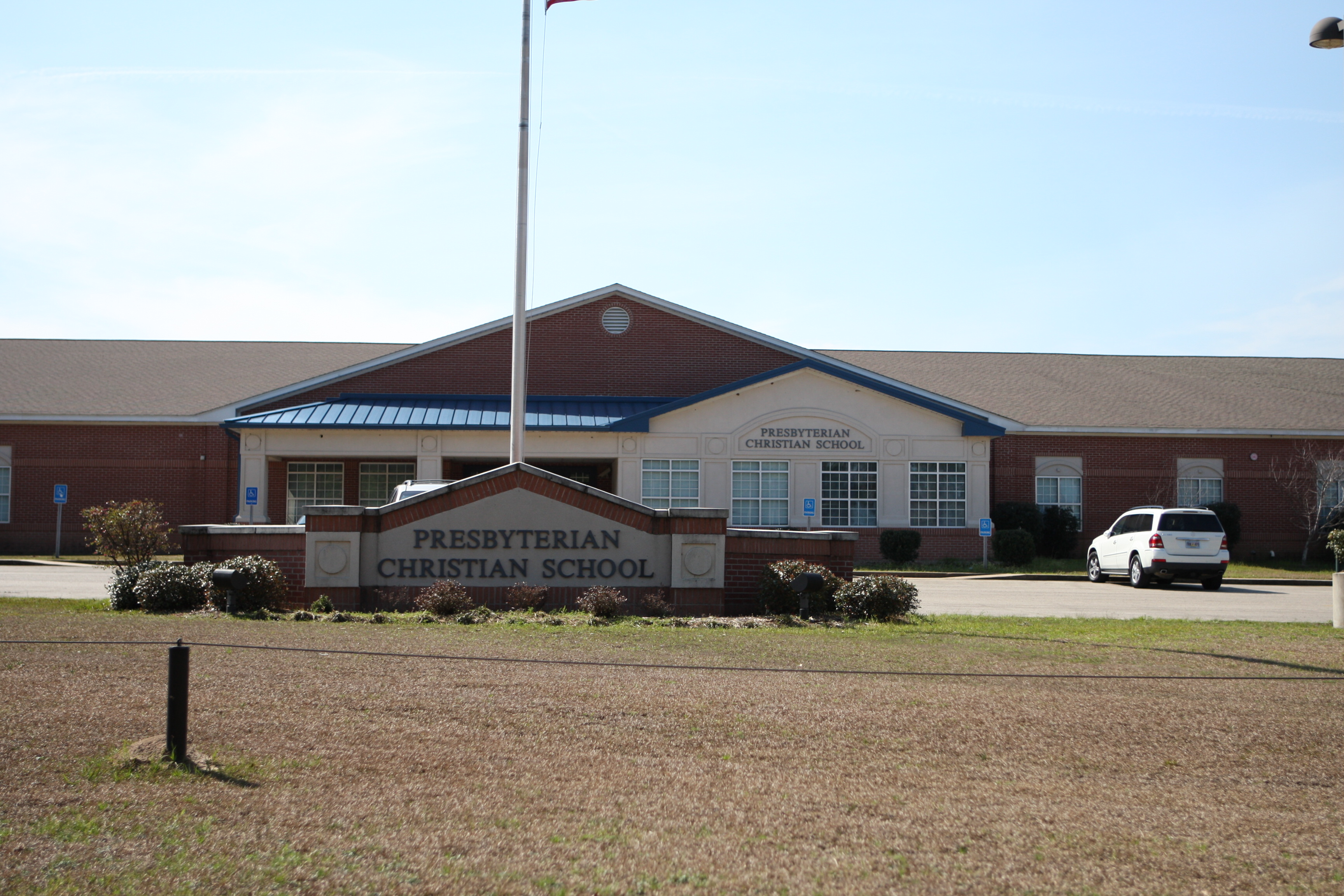

Location
- Preschool - 4901 Hardy Street; Elementary - 103 W.S.F. Tatum Drive; Secondary - 221 Bonhomie Road; Hattiesburg, Forrest County, Mississippi 39401; United States; 31.2851°N 89.3117°W

Information
- School type: Independent Christian School
- Motto: United in Faith, Pursuing Excellence.
- Religious affiliation: Christian
- Denomination: Presbyterian
- Established: 1975
- Administrator: Heather Tisdale (Preschool), Ginny Graham (Elementary), and Brandi Richardson (Secondary)
- Head of school: Jimmy Messer
- Enrollment: c. 1,000
- Mascot: Bobcat
- Website: www.pcsk12.org
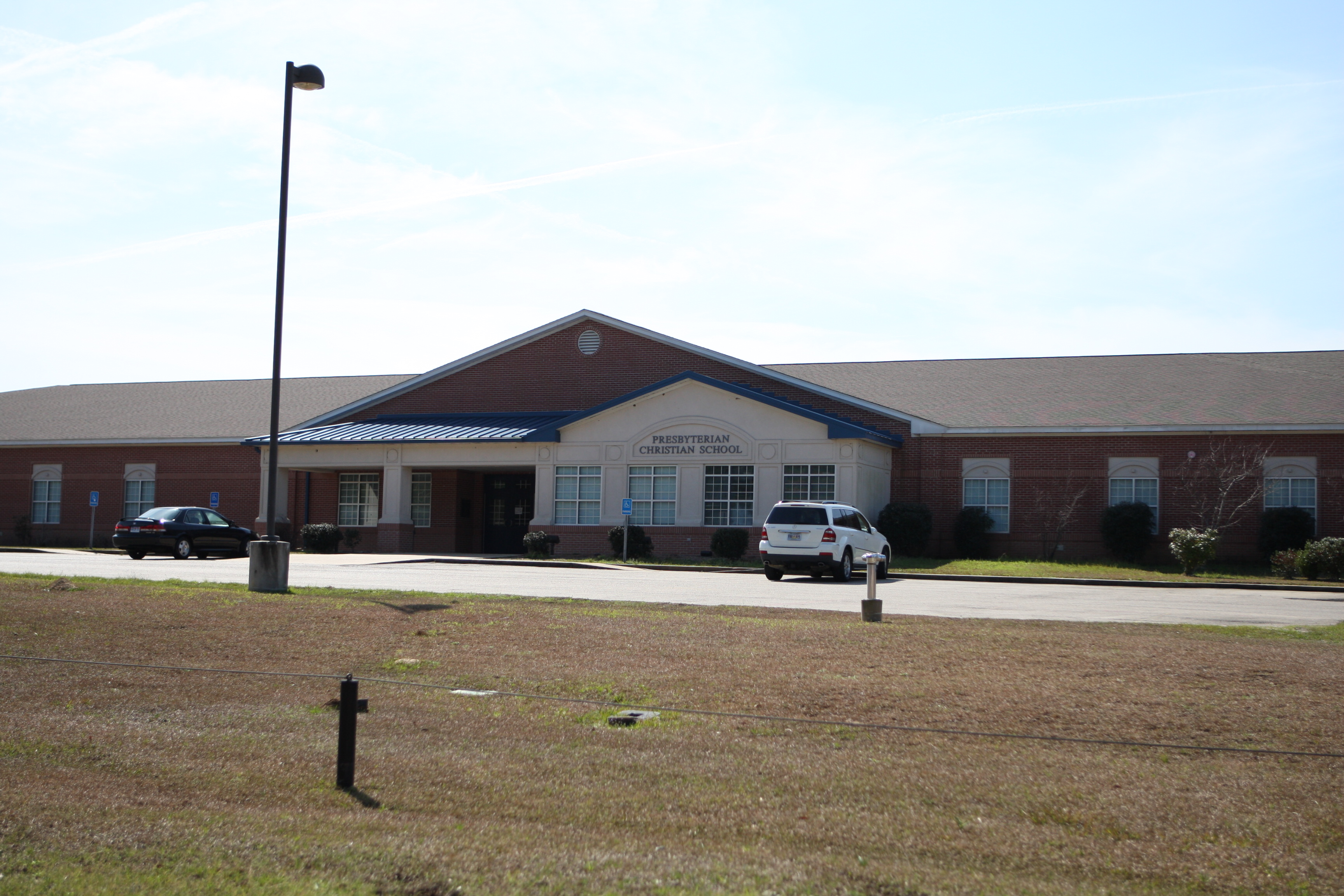

Presbyterian Christian School (PCS), is a private Christian school in Hattiesburg, Mississippi. It was originally founded as Bay Street Christian Day School in 1976. It serves preschool through grade 12. Grades K5-6 attend one campus, while 7-12 attend an adjacent campus.

The historian Joseph Crespino has noted that, unlike many other private schools in Mississippi, PCS was established after school desegregation began and enrolled minority students within a few years of its founding. Crespino's theory has been questioned, in light of the school's enrollment patterns compared to the general (at the time) enrollment patterns of white Southern families in private schools following desegregation.

On August 29, 2024, it was announced that PCS would be moving from the Midsouth Association of Independent Schools to the Mississippi High School Activities Association starting in the 2025-26 school year. This was due to the long driving distances to some of the other MAIS Class 6A schools such as Jackson Prep and Hartfield Academy. After the MHSAA released the enrollment figures for 2025-27, PCS was classified as a MHSAA Class 3A School and was assigned to Region 8-3A with the other schools in the region being Tylertown High School, St. Patrick Catholic High School (Biloxi, Mississippi), Saint Stanislaus College in Bay St. Louis, and West Marion High School for most sports. . 2 years of being in the MHSA PCS has gone 8-3 in the regular season twice. Thanks to the players in the class of 2027 the team has been productive on the gridiron

== 2004 Justice Antonin Scalia Incident ==
On April 7, 2004, Supreme Court Justice Antonin Scalia made a half-hour long speech at the school's secondary campus in the school's auditorium and spoke on the Constitution to the students there. While this occurred, a deputy marshal told two reporters for the Hattiesburg American that they had to erase all recordings of Scalia's remarks. Scalia had a policy that no reporters could ever record his public remarks, which the reporters had not been told before. The Hattiesburg American sued the agency and requested the investigation report under the Freedom of Information Act but the Marshals' Service refused. On April 9, Scalia confirmed in a public remark that he had written letters to the reporters, apologizing for the situation. This series of events made national headlines, appearing in Fox News and PBS News Hour articles.
