= Forrest County Multipurpose Center =

Coordinates: 31.257387°N 89.276250°W

The James Lynn Cartlidge Forrest County Multipurpose Center is an arena and county fairgrounds complex located in Hattiesburg, Mississippi. It consists of many buildings including a 120,000-square-foot (11,000 m^{2}) main arena, a covered warm-up arena, and a conference center with 3,360 square feet (312 m^{2}) of floor space. It is used for sporting events, concerts, trade shows, meetings and other special events.

The 19th annual Southern Miss Coca-Cola Classic Rodeo took place here in January 2022.
