= Hattiesburg Public School District =

School district in Mississippi, United States

Hattiesburg Public Schools

Location
- Hattiesburg, Mississippi

District information
- Type: Public school district
- Grades: PreK-12
- Established: 1885
- Superintendent: Dr. Robert Williams
- Asst. superintendent(s): Dr. Michael Battle, Dr. Tonsa Vaughn

Students and staff
- District mascot: Tigers
- Colors: Purple and gold

Other information
- Schedule: Central office hours 8:00 am - 5:00 pm Elementary schools 8:00 am - 3:00 pm Middle school 7:20 am - 2:45 pm High school 8:30 Am - 3:55 pm
- Website: www.hattiesburgpsd.com

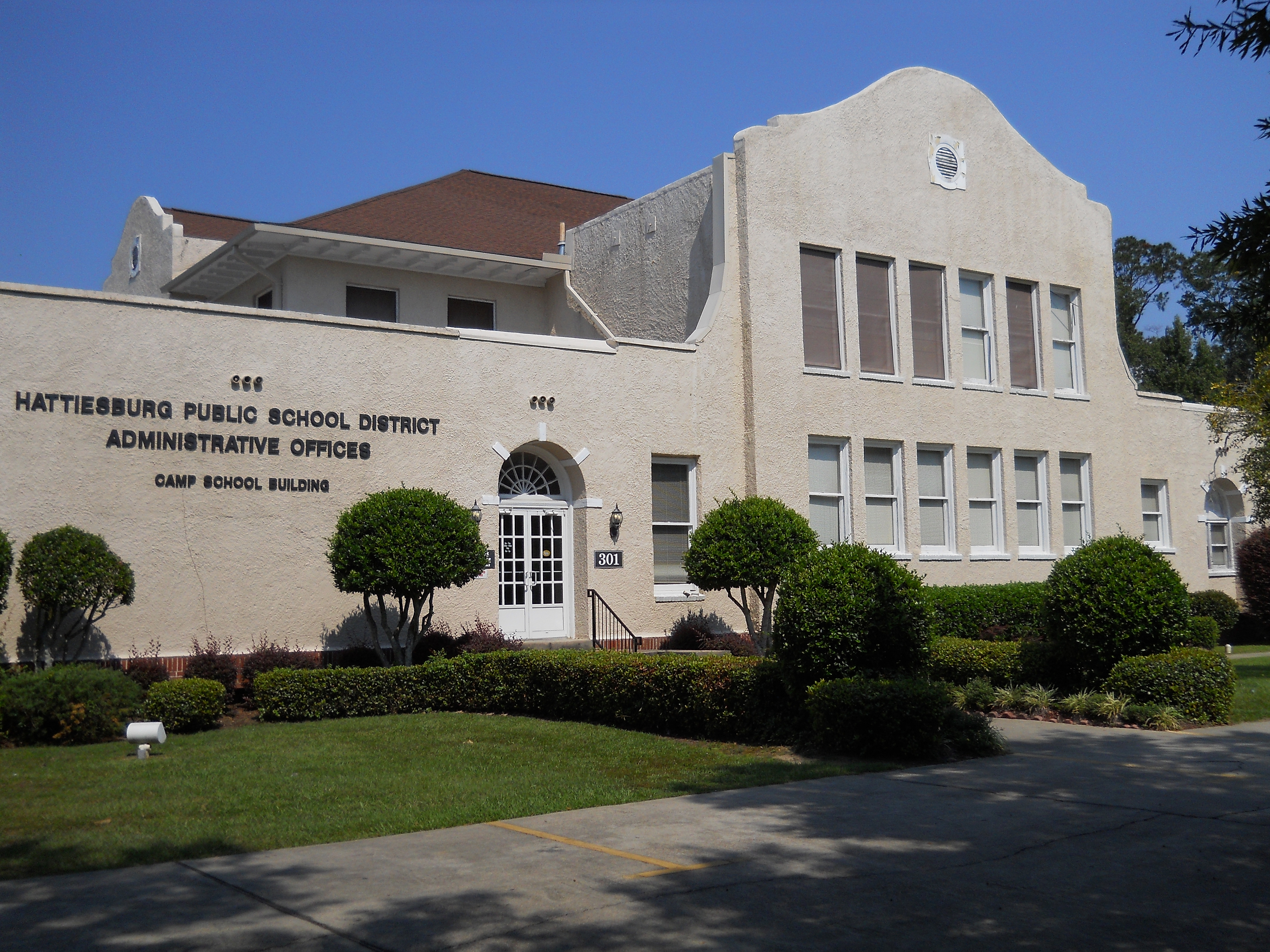
Camp School Building, district headquarters

Hattiesburg Public Schools is a public school district based in Hattiesburg, Mississippi, United States. The district includes most of Hattiesburg, but not all of it. Most of the district is located in Forrest County, but a small portion extends into Lamar County.

== Schools ==
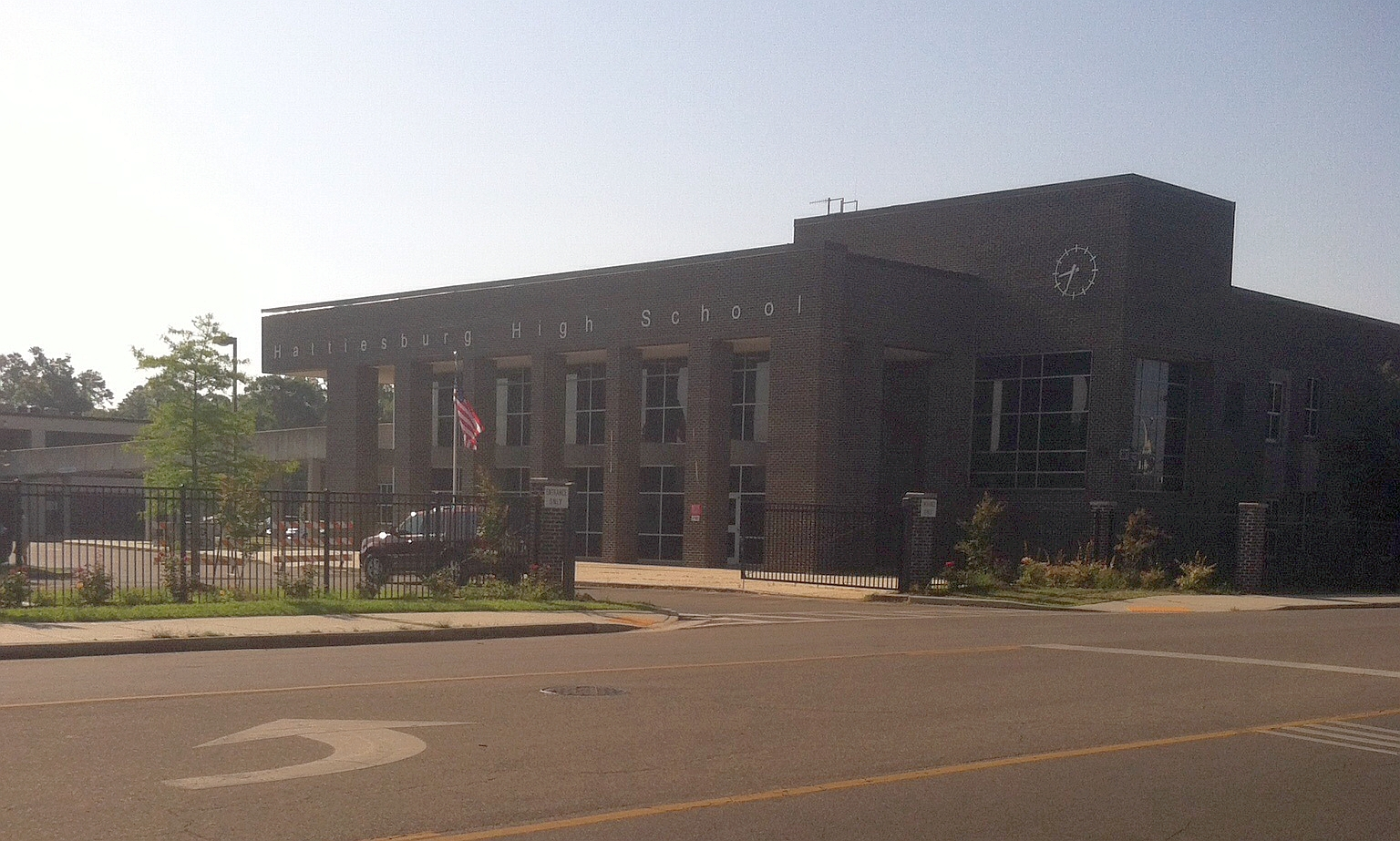
Hattiesburg High School

=== Hattiesburg High School ===
Grades 9-12

- James Grubbs, principal

=== N.R. Burger Middle School ===
Grades 7-8

- Carol Jones, principal

=== Hattiesburg STEAM Academy ===
Grade 6

- Dr. Tekecia Chapman, principal

=== Elementary schools ===
==== Grace Christian Elementary School (grades PreK - 5) ====
- Nickalaya Jackson, principal

==== George H. Hawkins Elementary School (grades PreK - 5) ====
- Dr. Teneka Hawkins-Lett, principal

==== L.J. Rowan Elementary School (grades PreK - 5) ====
- Jaronda Allen, principal

==== W.I. Thames Elementary School (grades PreK - 5) ====
- Dr. Christie Moss, Principal

==== F.B. Woodley Elementary School (grades PreK - 5) ====
- Felica Morris, principal

=== Alternative school ===
==== Lillie Burney Learning Center ====
- Dr. Della Watson, principal

== Demographics ==
=== 2024–25 school year ===
Hattiesburg Public Schools serves a total of 3,860 students. The gender distribution is relatively balanced, with 49.33% male and 50.67% female students. In terms of racial demographics, the student population is predominantly Black, comprising 85.36% of the total enrollment. Hispanic students make up 10.52%, while White students represent 3.52%. Asian, American Indian, and Pacific Islander students each account for less than 1% of the student body.

=== Previous school years ===
School year	Enrollment	Gender makeup		Racial makeup					
School year	Enrollment	Female	Male	Asian	African American	Hispanic	Native American	White	Pacific Islander
2020-21	3,934	51%	49%	0.46%	86.46%	6.86%	.05%	6.21%	--
2021-22	3,923	49%	51%	0.46%	86.27%	7.14%	0.05%	6.09%	--
2022-23	3,854	50%	50%	0.60%	83.99%	8.51%	0.05%	6.72%	0.10%
2023-24	3,799	51%	49%	0.39%	85.61%	10%	0.08%	3.90%	.03%

== Accountability statistics ==
	2020–21	2021–22	2022–23	2023–24	2024–25
District accreditation status	Accredited	Accredited	Accredited	Accredited	Accredited
School performance classifications
Level 5 (A-rated) schools	0	4	6	4	pending
Level 4 (B-rated) schools	5	3	1	4	pending
Level 3 (C-rated) schools	1	1	1	0	pending
Level 2 (D-rated) schools	0	0	0	0	pending
Level 1 (F-rated) schools	2	0	0	0	pending
Not assigned	0	0	0	0	pending

== See also ==
- List of school districts in Mississippi
