= Lillie Maie Hubbard =

American diplomat

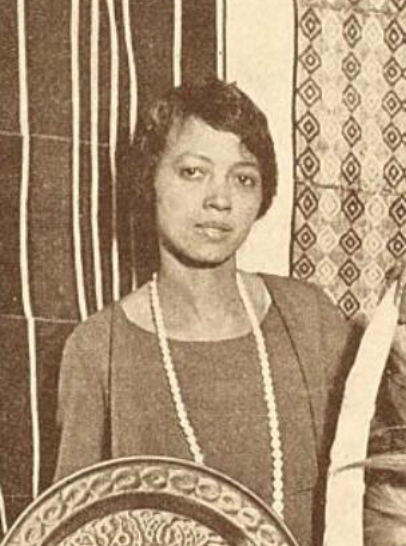
- Lillie Maie Hubbard, from a 1929 publication
- Born: February 19, 1898; Hattiesburg, Mississippi, U.S.
- Died: October 2, 1997 (age 99)
- Other names: Lillie Mae Hubbard, Lillie Marie Hubbard, Lillie Maie Harvey
- Occupation(s): Diplomat, embassy staff

Lillie Maie Hubbard Harvey (February 19, 1898 – October 2, 1997) was an American member of the United States Foreign Service for 38 years, from 1922 to 1961, with consular postings in Liberia, Portugal, the Canary Islands, the Azores, and Cuba. At the time of her retirement, she was vice-consul and citizenship officer at the United States Embassy in Rio de Janeiro.

Hubbard was described as "the only Negro woman in the foreign service department of the United States" in 1934, and later as "the State Department's first female African-American employee to serve overseas."

== Early life ==
Hubbard was born in Hattiesburg, Mississippi, the daughter of Edmund Dallas Hubbard and Emily A. Brown Hubbard. Her father was the founding pastor of Morning Star Baptist Church of Chicago, and a missionary. He died in Monrovia in 1932. "I am not a graduate of any school," she told Ebony magazine in 1960, "but I would not exchange my travel for the formal education I could have had by staying in the United States."

== Career ==
Hubbard was in Liberia with her parents on a mission trip when she joined the United States Consular Service in 1922, at first as a temporary clerk. She worked in Liberia and Portugal as her first two assignments. She contracted malaria in Liberia, and spent sixteen years at Las Palmas, Canary Islands, in part to recover her health. Her thirtieth year in the service was marked with a party and a gold pin in Ponta Delgada in 1952. In 1953 she became vice-consul at the United States Embassy in Havana. She retired in 1961, as vice-consul and citizenship officer at the United States Embassy in Rio de Janeiro.

Hubbard spoke French, Spanish and Portuguese. She exhibited her collection of West African art in Chicago in 1929. She corresponded regularly with W. E. B. Du Bois, especially in the 1920s.

== Assignments ==
- Monrovia, Liberia (1922–1927)
- Oporto, Portugal (1927–1930)
- Las Palmas, Canary Islands (1930–1946)
- Ponta Delgada, the Azores (1946–1953)
- Havana, Cuba (1953–1956)
- Rio de Janeiro, Brazil (1956–1961)
