= CBS 22 =

CBS 22 may refer to one of the following television stations in the United States:

- WHLT in Hattiesburg–Laurel, Mississippi
- WSBT-TV in South Bend, Indiana
- WYOU in Scranton–Wilkes-Barre, Pennsylvania
