= African American Military History Museum =

- U.S. National Register of Historic Places
- Mississippi Landmark
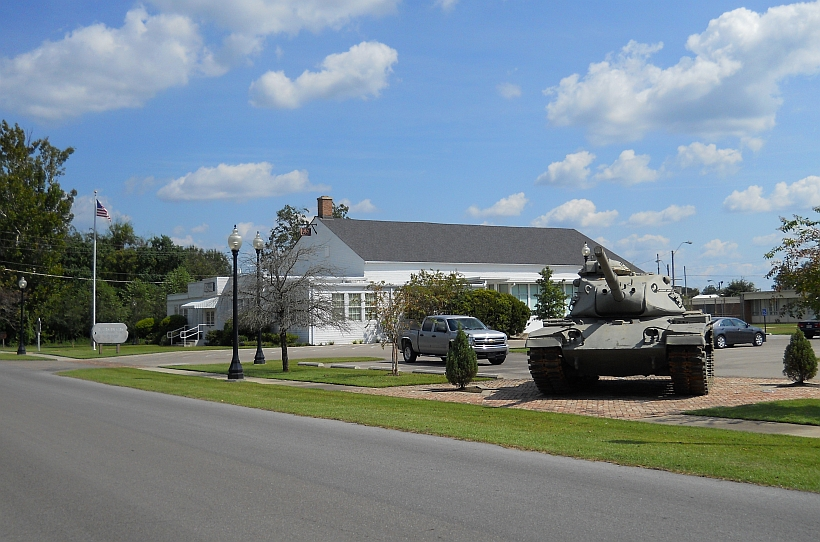
- African American Military History Museum in 2012

- Location within Mississippi Location within the United States
- Location: 305 East Sixth Street, Hattiesburg, Mississippi
- Coordinates: 31°20′03″N 89°17′34″W
- Area: 0.5 acres (0.20 hectares)
- Built: 1942
- NRHP reference No.: 04000267
- USMS No.: 035-HAT-0347-NR-ML

Significant dates
- Added to NRHP: April 06, 2004
- Designated USMS: April 16, 2010

The African American Military History Museum, also known as East Sixth Street USO Building, located in Hattiesburg, Mississippi, United States, opened to the public on May 23, 2009. The museum building was originally constructed in 1942 as a USO Club for African American soldiers who were stationed at Camp Shelby. The structure was added to the National Register of Historic Places in 2004 and was designated a Mississippi Landmark in 2010.

== Description ==
The East Sixth Street USO building was unique in that it was constructed specifically to house an African American USO, shortly after the United States entered World War II, and had support of both Blacks and Whites in Hattiesburg. The structure is a T-shaped wood-frame building. The interior contained an auditorium, stage, lobby, men's and women's restrooms, dressing rooms, meeting rooms, and a central brick chimney. The auditorium measured 34 by 55 feet (10 by 17 meters). The stage in the auditorium was raised 3 feet (0.91 meters) above the floor and measured 20 by 22 feet (6.1 by 6.7 meters) with dressing rooms on either side.

== History ==
=== USO club ===
Between 1942 and 1946, the East Sixth Street USO Club served as a home away from home for African American soldiers who were stationed at Camp Shelby. The facility was a place where soldiers could come for recreation, relaxation, and socialization. Examples of services provided at the USO included a library, darkroom, lounge, counseling, music, mail service, religious literature, and sewing service.

=== Museum ===
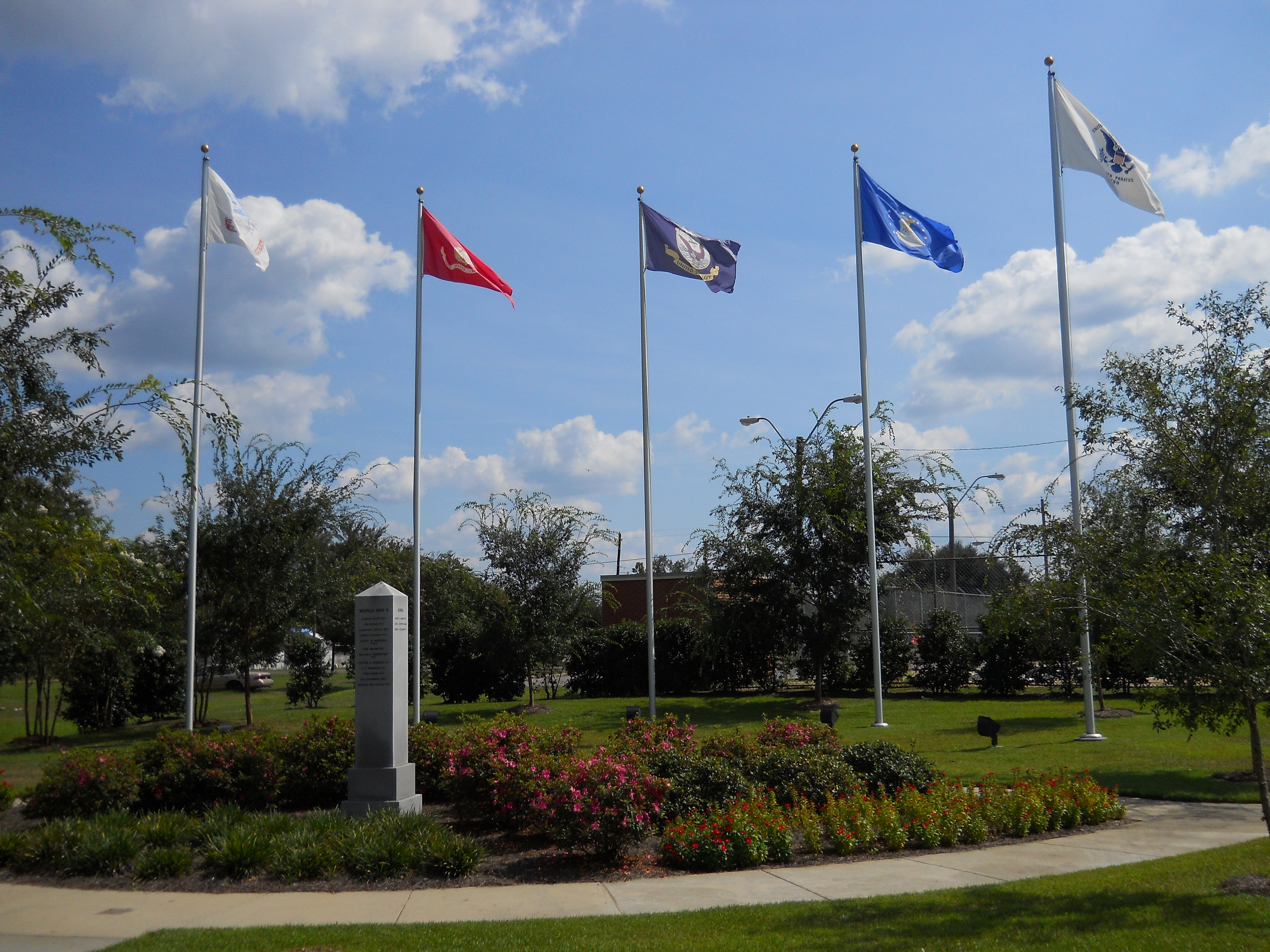
Memorial Gardens at the African American Military History Museum

Prior to becoming the African American Military History Museum, the former USO building housed the N.R. Burger Center which served as a museum and community space to commemorate the allegiance of African-American soldiers through displays of historical documents, artifacts, and photographs.

Renovation of the USO Building as the African American Military History Museum was completed in 2009. The original USO auditorium was subdivided into venues for historical military exhibits, to include the following: Revolutionary War, Buffalo Soldiers, World War I, World War II, Korean War, Vietnam, Desert Storm, Global War on Terrorism, and Hattiesburg Hall of Honor. Between 2009 and 2012, approximately 13,000 visitors had toured the museum.

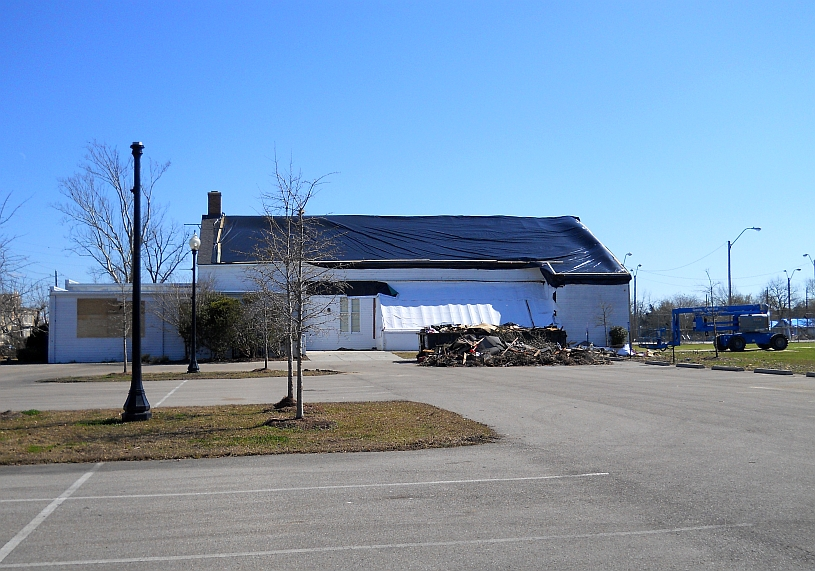
A tornado damaged the Museum in February 2013

== Tornado damage ==
On February 10, 2013, an EF-4 tornado passed through Hattiesburg. During the storm, the roof of the Museum was severely damaged, causing exhibits and artifacts to be soaked by rain. Museum personnel estimated that the structure would be closed for at least one year for restoration and announced that museum artifacts had been relocated to another facility for storage.

Following a year of reconstruction, the museum officially reopened on February 6, 2014. Estimates of damage from the tornado were $450,000 to the building and $600,000 to the museum contents.

== See also ==
- Mississippi Armed Forces Museum
