= WORV =

- Hattiesburg, Mississippi; United States
- Broadcast area: Hattiesburg-Laurel
- Frequency: 1580 kHz
- Branding: Heartbeat of the Hub City

Programming
- Language: English
- Format: Religious

Ownership
- Owner: Circuit Broadcasting Co.

Technical information
- Licensing authority: FCC
- Facility ID: 11227
- Class: D
- Power: 1,000 watts (day); 88 watts (night)
- Transmitter coordinates: 31°20′33.60″N 89°17′53.20″W

Links
- Public license information: Public file; LMS

WORV (1580 AM, "Heartbeat of the Hub City") was a radio station broadcasting a religious format. Licensed to Hattiesburg, Mississippi, United States, the station served the Hattiesburg-Laurel area. The station was owned by Circuit Broadcasting Co.

The Federal Communications Commission cancelled the station’s license on December 15, 2025.
