= List of University of Southern Mississippi people =

The following is a list of notable people associated with the University of Southern Mississippi, located in the American city of Hattiesburg, Mississippi.

== Alumni ==
=== Politics and government ===
- David Baria '87 – member of the Mississippi House of Representatives, 2018 candidate for U.S. Senate
- Toby Barker '04, '06 – mayor of Hattiesburg
- Phil Bryant '77 – governor of Mississippi
- Thomas G. Clausen (Ph.D. Education) – last elected state school superintendent in Louisiana, 1984–1988
- Evelyn Gandy – first woman to serve in several Mississippi state governmental positions, including lieutenant governor; Democrat
- Cindy Hyde-Smith – Mississippi's Commissioner of Agriculture and Commerce, 2018 appointee to the United States Senate to replace Thad Cochran
- Tom King '73 – Mississippi Southern District Transportation commissioner 2012–, MS senator
- Oseola McCarty '98 (honorary degree) – university benefactor
- Mark D. McElroy – Democratic member of the Arkansas House of Representatives for Desha County since 2013
- Steven Palazzo – U.S. representative for Mississippi's 4th congressional district
- John A. Polk – Republican state senator
- Ronald J. Rabin – Republican state senator
- Martha Dunagin Saunders '69 – former president of the University of Southern Mississippi
- Clifford Ronald "Ronnie" Shows – former Democratic member of the United States House of Representatives from Mississippi
- James W. Smith, Jr. '65 – chief justice, Supreme Court of Mississippi
- Gene Taylor '80 (graduate studies) – former U.S. representative, Mississippi's 4th Congressional District
- Tony Yarber – mayor of Jackson, Mississippi 2014–2017

=== Media and the arts ===
- Natalie Allen '84 – CNN International Anchor, CNN Newsroom, Southern Miss Alumni Award winner
- Mary Ryan Brown – comedian and internet personality
- Jimmy Buffett '69 – singer, songwriter, and author
- Trishelle Cannatella – reality television personality
- Cat Cora – celebrity chef, Iron Chef America on Food Network
- M.C. Gainey – actor, Sideways, Con Air, Django Unchained, Lost
- Victor Gischler, PHD – novelist, comic book writer
- Gary Grubbs '72 – actor, JFK, The Astronaut's Wife, The O. C., Will & Grace
- Ed Hinton '70 – sportswriter for ESPN.com
- Eddie Hodges (B.S. Psychology '73, M.S. Counseling '75) – former child actor, The Music Man on Broadway, numerous movie and TV roles; pop singer and songwriter; mental health counselor
- John Holman '83 – short story writer, novelist, and academic
- Cooper Huckabee – actor
- Clifton Hyde – musician, Blue Man Group
- Ted Jackson – Pulitzer Prize-winning photo journalist, New Orleans Times-Picayune
- Nan Kelley – host of Grand Ole Opry Live, GAC Network; Miss Mississippi
- Tom Malone – musician, CBS Orchestra, Late Show with David Letterman, Blues Brothers Band
- Ed McGowin – painter and sculptor
- Whitney Miller '11 – winner of the first MasterChef title from season one of the Fox television show; author of cookbook
- Michael Holloway Perronne – novelist
- Patrik-Ian Polk '94 – producer, filmmaker, and artist
- Sally-Ann Roberts – anchor for WWL-TV in New Orleans
- Jameson Rodgers – country music singer, songwriter
- Phillip Sandifer – singer/songwriter
- Chuck Scarborough – Emmy award-winning anchor at WNBC-TV in New York City; author
- David Sheffield '72 – comedy writer; screenwriter for Saturday Night Live, wrote screenplays including Police Academy II and Coming to America
- Dalton Smith '59 – Grammy Award-winning trumpeter with Stan Kenton
- Michael Farris Smith '02 – writer, novelist
- Tom Smith '79 – musician, Jazz Education Hall of Fame
- Ugly God – rapper, songwriter, record producer; featured on the 2017 XXL Freshman list
- Steve Wiest '80 – musician, jazz trombonist with Maynard Ferguson; Grammy-nominated composer, arranger; director of the One O'Clock Lab Band
- Michael Williams – filmmaker, producer and screenwriter
- Clymer Wright – editor of Fort Bend Reporter in Fort Bend County, Texas; later conservative political activist in Houston
- William Garrett Wright – poet

=== Military ===
- Major General Jeffery Hammond 1978, 1986 – led one of the initial battalions into Bosnia in enforcement of the Dayton Peace Accords, served as the commander of U.S. forces in Baghdad, where he served 33,000 troops of the U.S. Army 4th Infantry Division and Multi-National Division Baghdad
- Colonel Ronald J. Rabin – commissioned as a second lieutenant of infantry from the ROTC program at Mississippi Southern College (now the University of Southern Mississippi)
- Major General Walter H. Yates, Jr. – multiple military decorations

=== Science and technology ===
- Roger Brent '73 – systems biologist at Fred Hutchinson Cancer Research Center
- Robert Hyatt '83 – author of Cray Blitz, a world chess champion computer program
- Jimmy Mays '79 – professor emeritus at the University of Tennessee
- Robert L. Stewart '64 – former NASA astronaut; retired Army brigadier general

=== Sports figures ===
- John Bale – MLB pitcher, Kansas City Royals
- Michael Boley – NFL linebacker, New York Giants
- Jeff Bower – former head football coach, The University of Southern Mississippi
- Chad Bradford – former MLB pitcher, Tampa Bay Rays
- Jeremy Bridges – NFL lineman, Arizona Cardinals
- Steve Broussard – former NFL punter, Green Bay Packers
- Mack Brown (graduate degree '76) – former head football coach, University of Texas Longhorns
- Kyle Burkhart – NFL offensive lineman, Seattle Seahawks
- Matt Carpenter '87 – trail runner
- Reggie Collier – first NCAA quarterback to rush for 1,000 yards, and pass for 1,000 yards in the same season
- Jamie Collins – NFL linebacker, New England Patriots, Cleveland Browns
- Jim Davenport – former MLB infielder and manager
- Rod Davis – former NFL linebacker, Minnesota Vikings
- Joe Dawson (born 1960) – American-Israeli basketball player, 1992 Israeli Basketball Premier League MVP
- Hanford Dixon – NFL cornerback, Cleveland Browns
- Demar Dotson – NFL offensive lineman, Tampa Bay Buccaneers
- Brian Dozier – former MLB infielder, Minnesota Twins
- Marcus Dupree – former NFL running back, Los Angeles Rams
- Brett Favre '91 – member of the Pro Football Hall of Fame former 11-time Pro Bowl and 3-time MVP NFL quarterback for the Atlanta Falcons, Green Bay Packers, New York Jets, and Minnesota Vikings
- Ray Guy '73 – member of the Pro Football Hall of Fame former 7-time Pro Bowl NFL punter, Oakland/Los Angeles Raiders
- Bobby Hamilton – former NFL defensive end, Cleveland Browns
- Major General Jeffery Hammond '78, '86 – athletics director at the University of Southern Mississippi
- Harold Hays '61 – NFL linebacker, Dallas Cowboys, San Francisco 49ers
- Don Hultz '62 – NFL defensive player, Minnesota Vikings, Philadelphia Eagles, Chicago Bears
- Tom Johnson – NFL defensive tackle, New Orleans Saints
- Ronald Jones – football player
- Maxie Lambright – former head football coach, Louisiana Tech
- Cliff Lewis – former NFL linebacker, Green Bay Packers
- Louis Lipps – former NFL Pro-Bowl wide receiver and 1984 AFC Rookie of the Year, Pittsburgh Steelers
- Chris Long – former women's basketball coach, Louisiana Tech
- Don Maestri – head basketball coach, Troy University
- Larry Mason – former NFL running back, Cleveland Browns and Green Bay Packers
- Kelly McCarty – American professional basketball player in Europe; former NBA player for the Denver Nuggets
- Ryan McKee – NFL offensive lineman, St. Louis Rams
- Gerald McRath – NFL linebacker, Tennessee Titans
- Nick Mullins – NFL quarterback, San Francisco Minnesota
- Shawn Nelson – NFL tight end, New York Jets
- Tyrone Nix – assistant head coach, University of Mississippi
- Derrick Nix – offensive coordinator, Auburn University
- Doyle Orange – CFL All-Star running back, Toronto Argonauts
- Todd Pinkston – former NFL wide receiver, Philadelphia Eagles
- Jeff Posey – former NFL linebacker, Washington Redskins
- Pat Rapp – former MLB pitcher, Florida Marlins
- Patrick Surtain '98 – former Pro-Bowl NFL defensive back, Miami Dolphins and Kansas City Chiefs
- Adalius Thomas – former NFL Pro-Bowl linebacker, New England Patriots
- Quez Watkins – NFL wide receiver, Philadelphia Eagles
- Clarence Weatherspoon '93 – former NBA basketball player; retired
- Terry Wells – former NFL running back, Houston Oilers and Green Bay Packers
- Chad Williams – former NFL defensive back, Kansas City Chiefs
- Jerrel Wilson – NFL punter for 15 seasons with the Kansas City Chiefs
- Sammy Winder – former NFL Pro-Bowl running back, Denver Broncos

=== Others ===
- Lloyd Donald Brinkman '52 (1929–2015) – businessman, cattle breeder, civic leader and art collector
- Mary S. Graham – president of Mississippi Gulf Coast Community College
- Frances E. Lee – professor of Politics, Princeton University
- Hannah Roberts – Miss Mississippi 2015 and 1st runner-up for Miss America 2016

== Faculty ==
- Gordon Gunter (1909–1998) – director (1955–1971) and director emeritus (1971–1979) of the university′s Gulf Coast Research Laboratory in Ocean Springs; influential fisheries scientist who pioneered the study of fisheries in the northern Gulf of Mexico
- Frances A. Karnes (1937–2025) – professor and director of the Frances A. Karnes Center for Gifted Studies
- William K. Scarborough – professor emeritus of History
- Kenneth M. Swope – professor of military history and Leo A. Shifrin Chair of Military & Naval History at the United States Naval Academy
