= Mary Ryan Brown =

American comedian and social media personality

- Education: University of Southern Mississippi (MA)
- Occupations: Internet personality; Comedian
- Spouse: Andrew Brown
- Children: 1
- Relatives: Frances A. Karnes (grandmother)

Instagram information
- Page: Mary Ryan Brown
- Genre: Comedy
- Followers: 200 K

TikTok information
- Page: maryryanbrowncomedy
- Followers: 73.9 K
- Last updated: November 14, 2026
- Website: maryryanbrown.com

Mary Ryan Brown is an American comedian and social media personality.

== Career ==
Prior to pursuing a career in comedy, Brown worked as a high school English teacher. She started performing stand-up comedy in 2022. She began creating comedic online content on social media platforms Instagram, YouTube, and TikTok in 2024, where she is known for her "Southern Mom" character, a parody and comedic take on mothers in the Southern United States.

== Personal life and education ==
Brown grew up in Hattiesburg, Mississippi and is the oldest of five children. She and her family regularly vacationed in Lower Alabama throughout her youth.

She earned a master's degree in creative writing from the University of Southern Mississippi.

She is married to Andrew Brown and has one daughter. She is the granddaughter of educator and academic Frances A. Karnes.
