= Frances A. Karnes =

American writer and educator

- Born: Frances A. Nessler; September 15, 1937; Quincy, Illinois, U.S.
- Died: August 22, 2025 (aged 87)
- Education: Quincy College; University of Illinois (PhD)
- Occupations: Educator; writer
- Spouse: M. Ray Karnes
- Children: 2
- Relatives: Mary Ryan Brown (granddaughter)

Frances A. Karnes (née Nessler; September 15, 1937 – August 22, 2025) was an American writer and educator. She served on the faculty at the University of Southern Mississippi from 1974 to 2014 and was the founding director of the Frances A. Karnes Center for Gifted Studies.

== Early life and education ==
Karnes was born on September 15, 1937 in Quincy, Illinois to John H. Nessler and Carlene F. Nessler. She graduated from Quincy Notre Dame High School. She attended Quincy College and earned a doctorate in education from the University of Illinois in 1973.

== Career ==
Karnes founded the Mississippi Association for Gifted Children. In 1974, Karnes worked with members of the Mississippi Legislature to have a law amended to provide a legal basis for funding gifted education programs in Mississippi.

She was a professor, and later professor emeritus, at the University of Southern Mississippi, serving on the faculty from 1973 to 2014. In 1979, she founded the university's Center for Gifted Studies and served as its director. In 1999, the center was renamed the Frances A. Karnes Center for Gifted Studies in honor of her educational work within gifted education programs.

Throughout her career, Karnes authored and co-authored over 250 books, journal articles, research studies, and other publications.

Karnes received the Mississippi Association for Gifted Children's Award for Excellence in 2003, was named a Distinguished University Professor and was listed in TeachTechTopia's Top 10 most influential special education professors in 2010, was added to the National Association for Professional Women's Legacy Registry in 2011, and was the recipient of the National Association for Gifted Children's Legacy Award in 2015.

She served on the Boys and Girls Club of Hattiesburg advisory council, the Hattiesburg Public School Foundation Board, the Forrest General Hospital Spirit of Women advisory council, the Forrest General Foundation Board, the National Association for Gifted Children, and the Council for Exceptional Children.

== Personal life and death ==
She was married to M. Ray Karnes, with whom she had two children. She was the grandmother of comedian Mary Ryan Brown.

Karnes died on August 22, 2025.
