= Jeffery Hammond =

United States Army officer (born 1959)

Jeffery W. Hammond
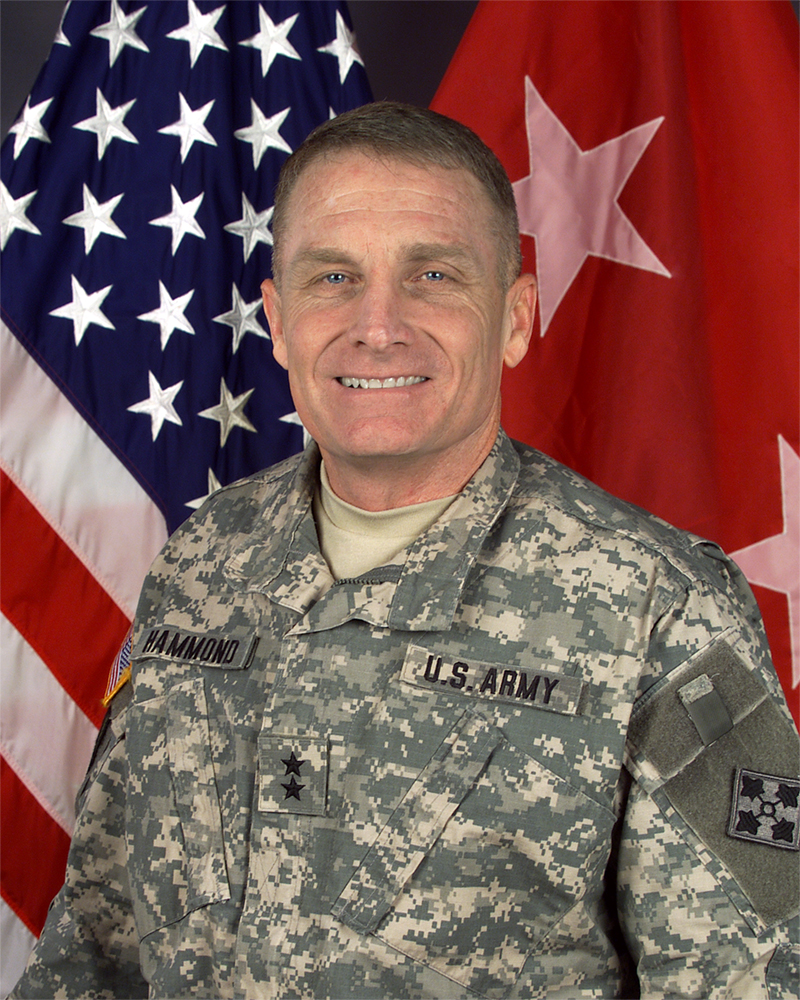
- Major General Jeffery W. Hammond
- Born: January 25, 1959 (age 67); Anaheim, California, U.S.
- Military career
- Allegiance: United States
- Branch: United States Army
- Service years: 1978 – 2010
- Rank: Major General
- Unit: 4th Infantry Division
- Commands: 4th Infantry Division; Multi-National Division, Baghdad; Division Artillery, 1st Cavalry Division; 4th Battalion, 29th Field Artillery; A Battery, 1st Battalion, 76th Field Artillery
- Conflicts: Operation Iraqi Freedom; Assistance Afghanistan Freedom
- Awards: Legion of Merit; Bronze Star (3); Defense Meritorious Service Medal; Meritorious Service Medal (6); Joint Service Commendation Medal; Army Commendation Medal (2)

Jeffery W. Hammond (born January 25, 1959) is a retired United States Army officer who previously served as the commanding general of the 4th Infantry Division and commander of U.S. forces in Baghdad, Iraq.

== Early life ==
Hammond attended the University of Southern Mississippi in Hattiesburg, receiving bachelor's and master's degrees in special education. He was a quarterback and captain for the USM football team.

== Military career ==
Hammond was commissioned as a second lieutenant of field artillery in 1978. He was assigned to the 3rd Infantry Division in Germany, where he advanced to command of a battery. He returned to the U.S. to take the Infantry Officer Advanced Course at Fort Benning, Georgia.

From 1984 to 1987 he returned to the University of Southern Mississippi, where he served as assistant professor of military science. After that, he spent a year in South Korea.

In 1988 he was assigned to the 24th Infantry Division at Fort Stewart, Georgia. With the 1st Battalion, 41st Field Artillery of that division, Hammond was deployed to Saudi Arabia as part of Operation Desert Shield in 1990 and participated in Operation Desert Storm, the recapture of Kuwait from Iraq in 1991.

In the mid-1990s Hammond took command of the 4th Battalion, 29th Field Artillery, part of the 1st Armored Division in Germany, leading them during Operation Joint Endeavor in Bosnia-Herzegovina. Staff service in Washington, D.C. and a tour as division artillery commander of the 1st Cavalry Division followed.

Hammond served as G3 for the British-led Allied Rapid Reaction Corps followed by duty as assistant division commander (support) of the 1st Cavalry Division during Operation Iraqi Freedom in 2003 in Iraq. He later served as the Army's Director of Operations, Readiness and Mobilization before taking command of the 4th Infantry Division on 19 January 2007.

== Return to Southern Miss ==
Hammond currently serves as the Director, Military and Veterans Student Affairs at The University of Southern Mississippi. he is also co-chair of the MS Community Veterans Engagement Board.

== Decorations ==
- Legion of Merit
- Bronze Star with two oak leaf clusters
- Defense Meritorious Service Medal
- Meritorious Service Medal with one silver oak leaf cluster
- Joint Service Commendation Medal
- Army Commendation Medal with oak leaf cluster
