= University of Southern Mississippi =

Public university in Hattiesburg, Mississippi, US

- Former name: List: Mississippi Normal College (1910–1924) State Teachers College (1924–1936) Mississippi State Teachers College (1936–1940) Mississippi Southern College (1940–1962)
- Motto: "Southern Miss to the Top!"
- Type: Public research university
- Established: March 30, 1910; 116 years ago
- Parent institution: Mississippi Institutions of Higher Learning
- Accreditation: SACS
- Academic affiliations: ORAU; Sea-grant; Space-grant
- Endowment: $169.3 million (2025)
- President: Joseph S. Paul
- Provost: Lance Nail
- Faculty: 899 (fall 2017)
- Students: 14,606 (fall 2020)
- Undergraduates: 11,451
- Postgraduates: 3,155
- Location: Hattiesburg, Mississippi, United States; 31°19′47″N 89°20′02″W
- Campus: 300 acres (1.2 km^{2}); Small city
- Other campuses: Gulfport; Long Beach; Ocean Springs; Stennis Space Center
- Media: Student Media Center
- Colors: Black and gold
- Nicknames: Golden Eagles; Lady Eagles
- Sporting affiliations: NCAA Division I FBS – Sun Belt; CUSA
- Mascot: Seymour d'Campus
- Website: usm.edu

The University of Southern Mississippi (Southern Miss or USM) is a public research university with its main campus in Hattiesburg, Mississippi, United States. It is accredited by the Southern Association of Colleges and Schools to award bachelor's, master's, specialist, and doctoral degrees. The university is classified among "R1: Doctoral Universities – Very High Research Activity".

Founded on March 30, 1910, the university is a dual-campus institution, with its main campus in Hattiesburg and its other large campus, Gulf Park, in Long Beach. It has five additional teaching and research sites, including the John C. Stennis Space Center and the Gulf Coast Research Laboratory (GCRL).

Originally called the Mississippi Southerners, the Southern Miss athletic teams became the Golden Eagles in 1972. The school's colors, black and gold, were selected by a student body vote shortly after the school was founded. The color scheme was inspired by the Mississippi Native species, Black Eyed Susans. While mascots, names, customs, and the campus have changed, the black and gold colors have remained constant. USM's 17 sport programs participate in NCAA Division I athletics, mainly as members of the Sun Belt Conference.

== History ==
The first five buildings erected on the university's Hattiesburg campus

The University of Southern Mississippi was founded on March 30, 1910, as Mississippi Normal College, a teacher-training school. The Normal College was created to standardize the process of training upcoming teachers. Before the existence of a specialized teaching college, instructors were required to travel throughout Mississippi in preparation for teaching their students. R. H. Hunt designed the original campus plan and seven buildings in the Colonial Revival style. The college's first president, Joseph Anderson Cook, presided over the opening session of instruction on September 18, 1912, and oversaw the construction of College Hall (the academic building); Forrest County Hall (men's and married students' dormitory); Hattiesburg Hall (women's dormitory); the Industrial Cottage (training laboratory for home management); and the president's home (now the Ogletree Alumni House). In its first session, Mississippi Normal College had an enrollment of 876 students, and stood for "clean, pure, efficient lives."

As the school developed its curriculum and departments, its name changed to reflect its progress: in 1924, to Mississippi State Teachers College, and in 1940, to Mississippi Southern College.

The college's fifth president, State Archivist William David McCain, was installed in 1955 and worked to expand Mississippi Southern College. He oversaw the construction of 17 new structures on campus and convinced Governor Ross Barnett to upgrade the school to university status in recognition of its graduate programs. On February 27, 1962, Barnett signed the bill into law that renamed the school the University of Southern Mississippi.

William David McCain (left) with Gov. Ross Barnett and Lt. Gov. Paul B. Johnson at signing of bill granting university status

=== Desegregation and civil rights ===
In 1954 the United States Supreme Court ruled in Brown v. Board of Education that segregation of public schools was unconstitutional. But when Clyde Kennard, a black Korean War veteran, attempted to enroll at Mississippi Southern College in the late 1950s, USM President William McCain made major efforts with the state political establishment and local black leaders to prevent it. Kennard was turned down three times. After he wrote letters about educational integration to the local paper, he was twice arrested on trumped-up criminal charges; he was eventually convicted and sentenced to seven years in the state prison.

McCain's direct involvement in this abuse of the justice system is unclear. He was likely aware that the charges against Kennard were fraudulent, but neither he nor other public officials made any objection. Speaking to businessmen in Chicago on a trip sponsored by the Mississippi State Sovereignty Commission, McCain said: "We insist that educationally and socially, we maintain a segregated society. ... In all fairness, I admit that we are not encouraging Negro voting," he said. "The Negroes prefer that control of the government remain in the white man's hands." Kennard was finally released on parole in 1963, when he was terminally ill with cancer; he died six months later.

Kennard meeting sister Sara Tarpley on arrival in Chicago after parole in 1963

By the early 1960s, national pressure was growing to integrate Mississippi's institutions of higher learning. McCain was well known to vehemently oppose having any black students at Mississippi Southern. In 1962 James Meredith attempted to enroll at the University of Mississippi, the state's flagship institution. His enrollment was accomplished after white rioting and use of federal troops to end the violence.

By the fall of 1965 both Ole Miss and Mississippi State University had been integrated—the former violently, the latter peacefully. McCain, USM, and state leaders recognized that the state needed to integrate to appeal to businesses outside the state. They made extensive confidential plans for the admission of USM's first two black students. A faculty guardian and tutor was secretly appointed for each to help with the transition. The campus police department was instructed to prevent or quickly stop any incident against the two black students. Student athletic, fraternity, and political leaders were recruited to keep the peace and protect the university from the kind of negative publicity Ole Miss had suffered during rioting against Meredith's enrollment.

As a result, black students Gwendolyn Elaine Armstrong and Raylawni Branch were enrolled without incident in September 1965. In 2018, USM unveiled a Freedom Trail Marker in honor of Clyde Kennard in front of Kennard Washington Hall, named after him and the first African-American doctoral student to graduate from USM, Walter Washington. Shortly thereafter, at the commencement ceremonies in May 2018, Kennard was posthumously awarded the Doctor of Humane Letters honoris causa. A student in Kennard's Sunday School class at Mary Magdalene Baptist Church in Eatonville, Mississippi, accepted the honor on his behalf.

Between 1955 and 1965, USM and McCain infringed upon gay and lesbian students' civil rights. Gay and lesbian students, especially male homosexuals, were targeted and expelled. McCain's intention was to purge the campus of all sexual impurities.

In 1969, the Afro-American Cultural Society (AACS) was founded. Alvin Williams, an early member of the organization and professor emeritus of media at the university, called AACS an "instrumental part of student life for black students" attending the university in the late 1960s. The organization was renamed the African American Student Organization (AASO) in the 1990s.

The transition from the 1960s to the 1970s involved a surge of social activism and major changes at the university. In response to black students' growing concerns, the university ramped up its efforts to hire black faculty. In 1972, "General Nat" (Confederate General Nathan Bedford Forrest) was discarded in favor of the Golden Eagles. In 1974, standout football player Fred Cook was voted the first black Mr. USM. The first black Greek organizations premiered in 1975. By the time McCain retired in 1975, enrollment had climbed to 11,000 students.

In the years following McCain's campus transformation, The University of Southern Mississippi continued to expand dramatically. Changes included replacement of the quarter system by semesters, creation of the Polymer Science Institute, reorganization of the university's 10 schools into six colleges including the College of Nursing, affiliation with Conference USA, the implementation of online classes; and an expansion of the Gulf Coast campus.

=== Presidents ===
- Joseph Anderson "Joe" Cook – 1912–1928
- Claude Bennett – 1928–1933
- Jennings Burton George – 1933–1945
- Robert Cecil Cook – 1945–1954
- Richard Aubrey McLemore (acting president) – 1955
- William David McCain – 1955–1975
- Aubrey K. Lucas – 1975–1996
- Horace Weldon Fleming Jr. – 1997–2001
- Aubrey Lucas (interim president) – 2001–2002
- Shelby Freland Thames – 2002–2007
- Martha Dunagin Saunders – 2007–2012
- Aubrey Lucas (interim president) – 2012–2013
- Rodney D. Bennett – 2013–2022
- Joseph S. Paul – 2022–present

=== 21st century ===
Academic rankings

National
- Forbes: 522
- U.S. News & World Report: 318 (tie)
- Washington Monthly: 235

Global
- U.S. News & World Report: 1724 (tie)

In the early 21st century, Southern Miss developed under the presidency of Shelby Thames. His tenure was characterized by a significant increase in the quantity of research conducted at the university. USM was classified as a "Doctoral / Research Extensive" university by the Carnegie Foundation during the Thames era. According to the National Science Foundation, USM spent $61 million on research and development in 2018, ranking it 183rd in the nation.

Thames's work to respond to the destruction wrought by Hurricane Katrina brought praise from the community. In October 2005, the Faculty Senate of the Gulf Park campus passed a resolution of appreciation. The Hattiesburg American reported that Thames's post-Katrina address to the faculty at Hattiesburg was well received. Thames did not lay off any university employees after the storm, although the Gulf Park campus alone sustained over $100 million in damage (By contrast, Tulane University in New Orleans released approximately 25% of its staff and dropped significant athletic and academic programs, including the computer science major and most engineering programs, in retrenchment after closure and damage to the campus.)

The Thames administration gained financing and supervised several campus construction projects, often in partnership with private-sector entities. An addition to the student union houses the second-largest Barnes & Noble store in the southern U.S., which is open to the community. Barnes & Noble pays $1.5 million in annual rent for the facility. Thames also negotiated a food services agreement with Aramark which will donate $9 million to university construction projects. Other enhancements include the upscale Power House restaurant (at a former college power plant adapted for this use); the $15 million sorority village; additions to the football, basketball, and baseball facilities; and urban design elements to make the campus more open, "green," and pedestrian-friendly.

The university experienced an unexpected, highly publicized drop from "Tier 3" to "Tier 4" in the U.S. News & World Report college rankings in 2004. This roughly coincided with the height of the Shelby Thames controversy, when he fired tenured professors for "dissension". Several organizations scrutinized his actions' legality, as tenure is designed to protect academic independence. In 2004, the USM Faculty Senate expressed its grievances to Thames after the allegations were heard. The Faculty Senate later published a review of the Thames Administration describing its controversies. After Thames resigned, by 2009, U.S. News & World Report again ranked the university as in the upper portion of "Tier 3.". In the 2011 U.S. News & World Report College ranking, USM was in the "Tier 2". In 2016, USM was ranked by U.S. News & World Report 125th in national public universities and 220th in national universities.

USM is also ranked highly by Washington Monthly, which has criticized rankings by U.S. News & World Report and developed its own system. These rankings attempt to make a more holistic assessment of an institution's value; USM ranked 98th out of 245 doctoral institutions, the highest ranking of any school in Mississippi. As of 2018, Washington Monthly ranked USM 235th overall nationally.

On February 10, 2013, an EF4 wedge tornado tore through the Southern Miss campus, causing tens of millions of dollars in damage. It formed in western Hattiesburg and continued into southwestern Alabama, destroying two buildings and damaging six others. As most students were away for Mardi Gras break and there were warnings of the tornado, there were no fatalities and few injuries on campus.

In June 2015 Southern Miss released a statement on the removal of the Mississippi state flag from all USM campuses.

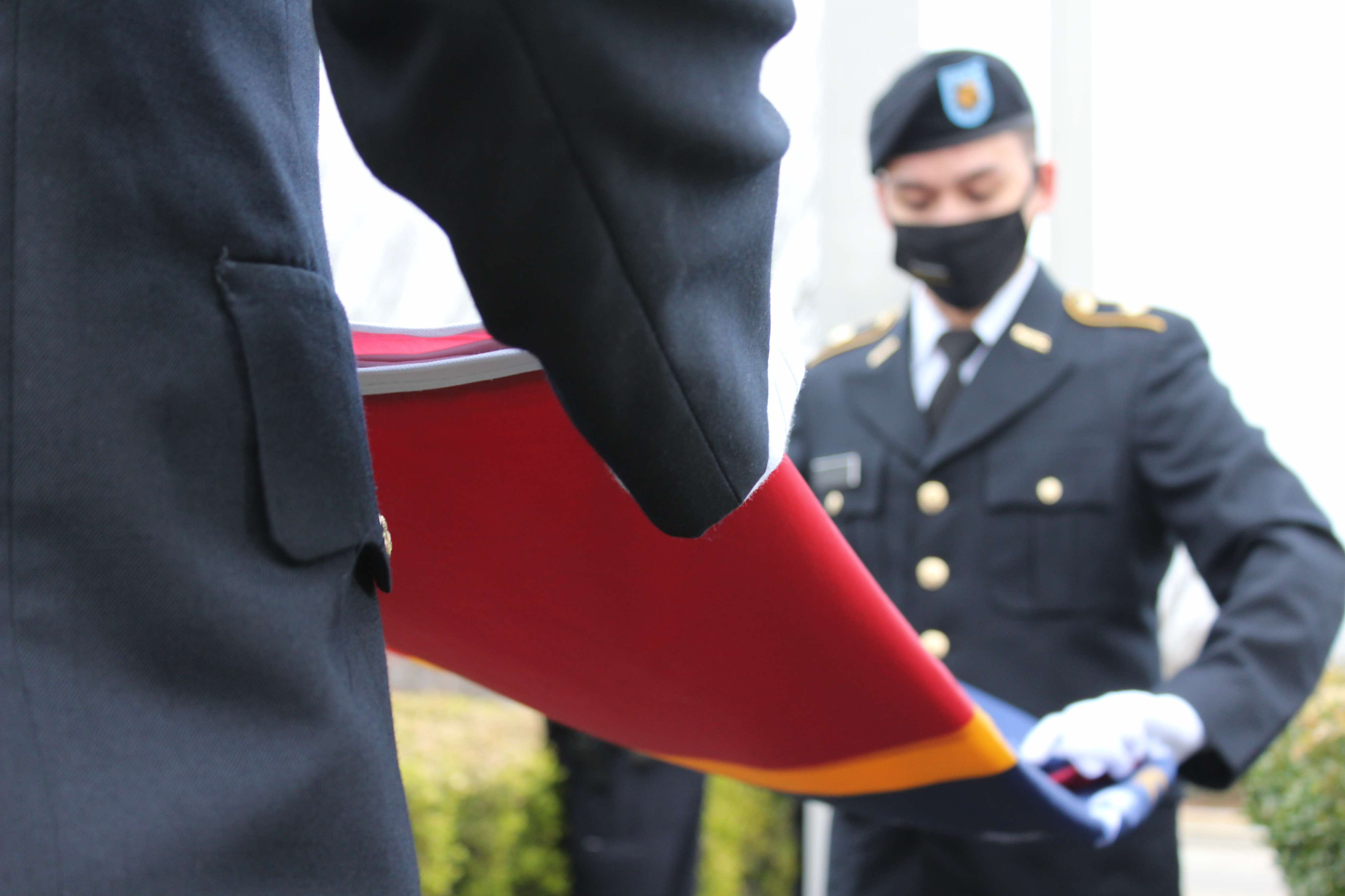
ROTC cadets fold the 2020 Mississippi flag before raising it over the campus.

On October 25, 2015, university president Rodney D. Bennett released another statement announcing that the university would only raise flags that he felt united all students. Since the removal of the state flag, protests to bring it back have become common Sunday occurrences on the Hattiesburg campus.

==== Golden Eagle logo dispute ====
In 2003, Southern Miss replaced its attack eagle logo from the 1990s with an eagle head logo. Two years later, when Southern Miss attempted to trademark the new logo, the University of Iowa filed against it, believing it too similar to its Hawkeyes logo. The new logo was very popular, and was placed on sports venues, advertising, and all merchandise. In August 2011, the US Patent and Trademark Office denied the trademark. In 2014, Southern Miss revealed a new logo that was a redesigned version of the 2003 logo. This logo was copyrighted and has mostly replaced the 2003 logo.

==== Army ROTC closure ====
In October 2013, the U.S. Army announced that, due to financial constraints and the low production rate of commissioned officers, 13 ROTC programs at various universities would be shut down, including the Golden Eagle Battalion of Southern Miss. The programs were to be ended by the end of the 2015 spring semester, but the universities appealed the decision. On October 12, a press conference was held at USM to protest the closure; speakers included Governor Phil Bryant and Major General Augustus Collins. In November, the Army said it had changed its plan to end programs at specified institutions, putting them on a two-year probation, with reevaluation. USM has been taken off probation and the ROTC program continues.

== Campus ==
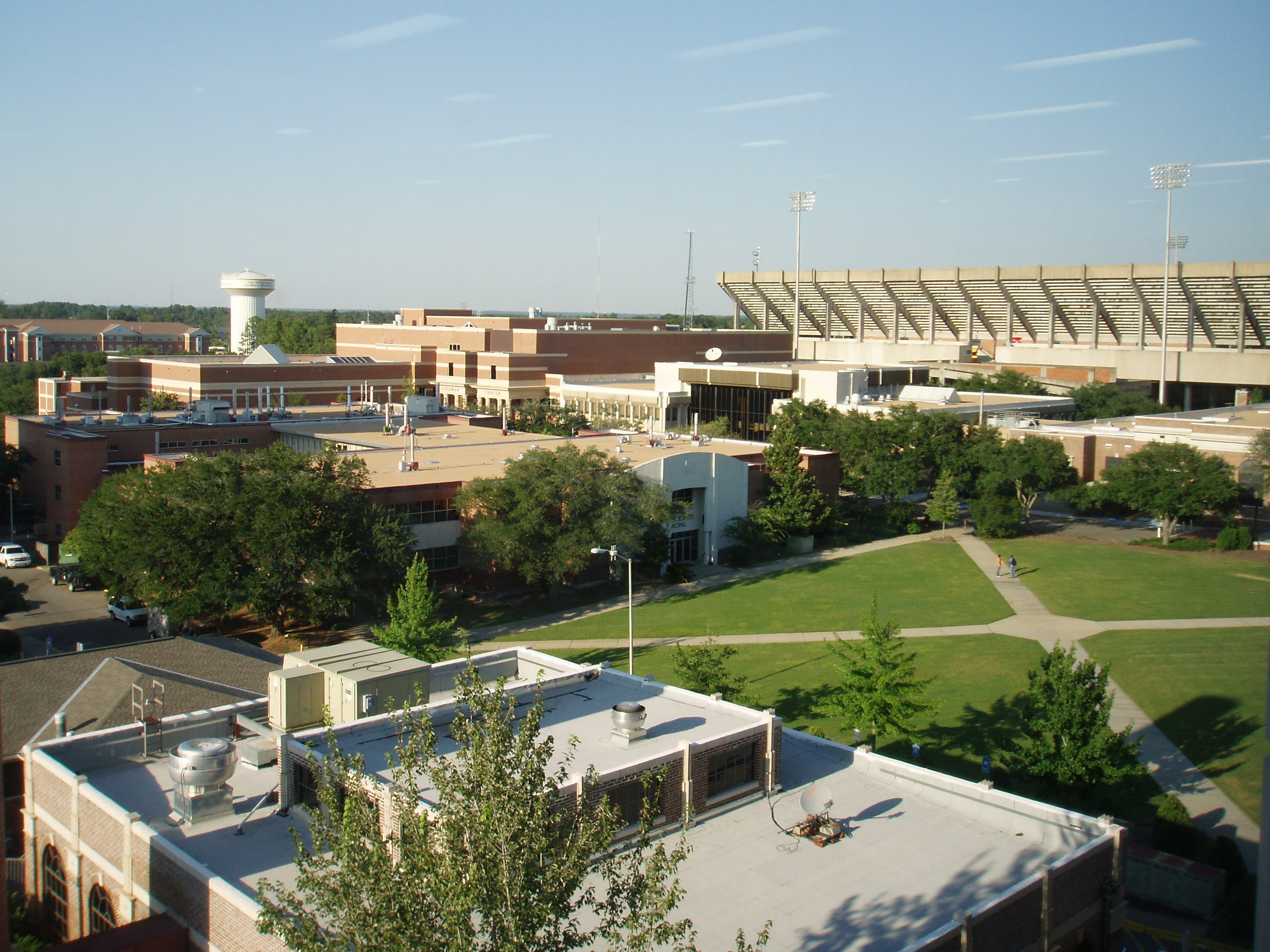
Hattiesburg campus in 2011

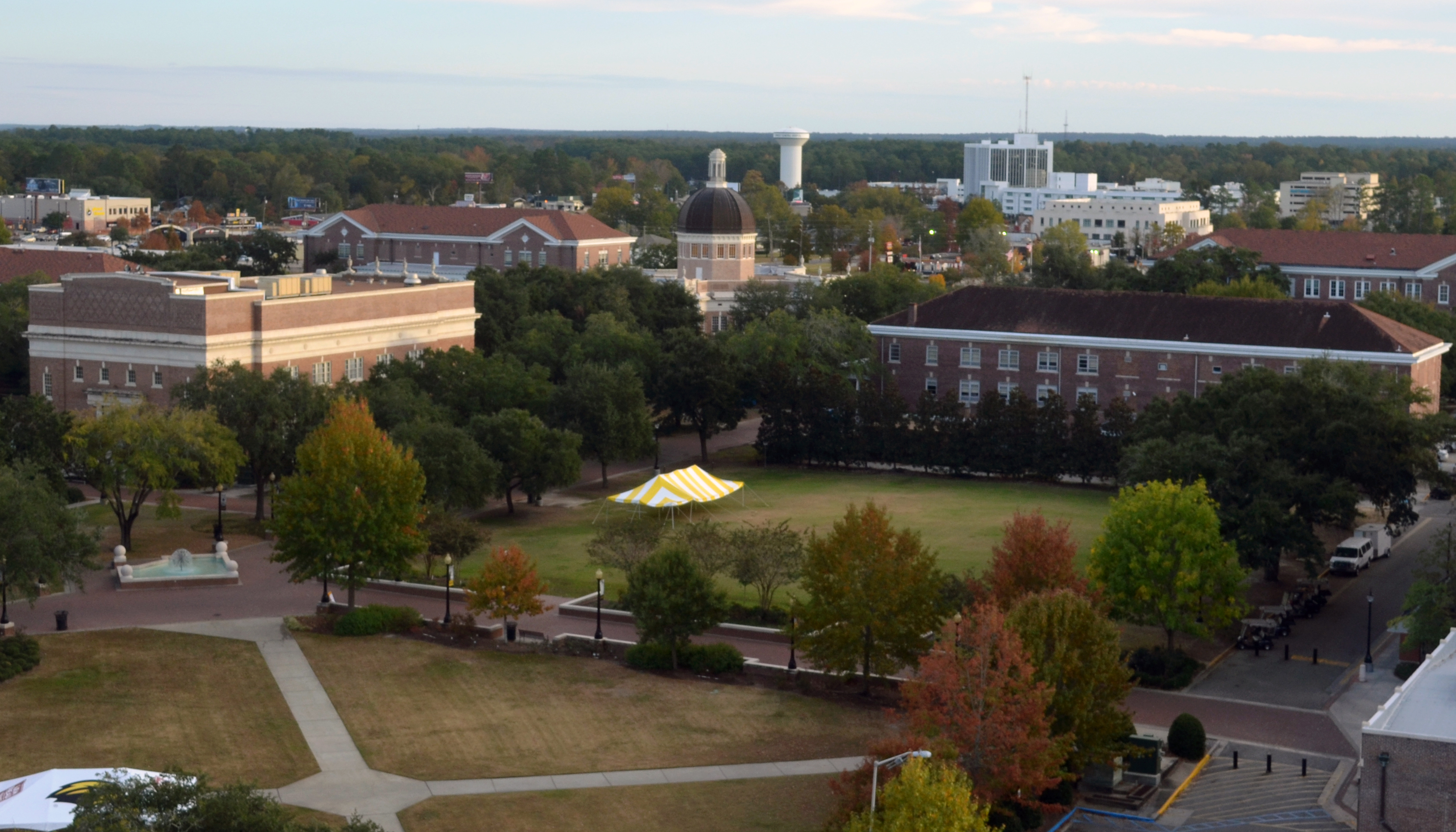
Aerial view of Bennett Auditorium (left), Lucas Administration Building (rear, dome), and Forrest County Hall (right) from the Johnson Science Tower

=== Gulf Park campus ===
The university's operations on the Mississippi Gulf Coast began in 1947 when Mississippi Southern College first organized classes at Van Hook Hall, on the Methodist Camp Grounds in Biloxi. In 1958, the operation was moved to Mary L. Michael Junior High School in Biloxi. To meet the educational needs of various occupational fields, the university relocated in 1964 to Keesler Air Force Base. In addition, it obtained classroom facilities for night classes from the Jefferson Davis campus of the Mississippi Gulf Coast Junior College. It called this complex the USM Harrison County Resident Center.

In September 1966, Southern Miss extended its offerings by adding the Jackson County Resident Center, located on the Jackson County campus of the MGCCC in Gautier. The Jackson County Center was built for the university by the Jackson County Board of Supervisors. This effort was encouraged by Shelby Thames when he was executive vice president of USM. The center was constructed with the intention of enabling students in Jackson County to complete four-year degrees in several fields through combined programs at MGCCC and USM. In 2009, however, the university decided to close its Jackson County Center and consolidate course offerings at other teaching sites on the Gulf Coast.

The Gulf Park College for Women in Gulfport, Mississippi, opened in 1921. The last commencement was held in 1971 and the University of Southern Mississippi acquired the campus in 1972. In March 1972, USM moved its Harrison County Resident Center program from the Jefferson Davis campus of MGCCC to the Gulf Park campus, located on Highway 90 in Long Beach. One of the most prominent landmarks on campus is the Friendship Oak. This huge live oak tree on the lawn of Hardy Hall and the Administration Building, dates from approximately 1487. The earliest available reference to the moniker Friendship Oak is found in an article written by Bob Davis, correspondent for the New York Sun. He described the tree in his book People, People, Everywhere (1936).

In July 1972, the Board of Trustees of State Institutions of Higher Learning established the USM Gulf Park and Keesler Air Force Base Center as an upper-level degree completion regional campus of the university. It offered programs leading to degrees at the baccalaureate and graduate levels. University development has continued and on August 19, 2002, Southern Miss admitted its first class of freshmen on its Gulf Park Campus. USM is the only comprehensive university in the state with dual-campus status.

In the early 21st century the Gulf Park campus serves as the central campus for several remote teaching centers, including:

- The Stennis Space Center Teaching and Research Site is located in Hancock County on the Mississippi-Louisiana border; it is NASA's largest rocket engine test facility. Stennis also is home to the university's Department of Marine Science.
- Gulf Coast Student Service Center Teaching Site: located in Gulfport, this became the interim site of the Gulf Park campus following Hurricane Katrina, from 2005 to 2012.
- Gulf Coast Research Laboratory Teaching and Research Site (GCRL), located in Ocean Springs, is home of the Department of Coastal Sciences, the Center for Fisheries and Research and Development, the Marine Education Center, and the Thad Cochran Marine Aquaculture Center.
- Point Cadet Teaching Site, located in Biloxi. The R/V Tommy Munro, a 97-foot research vessel, is a unit of GCRL and docks at Point Cadet.
- The Keesler Center, located on Keesler Air Force Base in Biloxi, provides courses for military personnel as well as the civilian community.

Other USM units in the Gulf Coast region are elements of the College of Marine Sciences; the Gulf Coast Research Laboratory in Ocean Springs; the J. L. Scott Marine Education Center and Aquarium on Point Cadet in Biloxi; the Hydrographic Science Research Center; and the Center for Marine Sciences at the John C. Stennis Space Center in Hancock County.

On August 29, 2005, Hurricane Katrina caused about $115 million in damage to Gulf Park. Classes were relocated to the Healthmark Center in Gulfport. In 2012, the Gulfport campus was closed and all facilities were moved back to the renovated Long Beach campus. The Friendship Oak survived this storm as it survived Hurricane Camille and countless lesser storms that have hit the area.

=== Libraries ===
- The Cook Library, located on the Hattiesburg campus, contains the principal collections of books, periodicals, microforms, government documents and other materials which directly support the instructional programs of The University of Southern Mississippi at all levels.
- The McCain Library and Archives houses the Library's Special Collections and University Archives on the Hattiesburg campus. Collections include the de Grummond Children's Literature Collection as well as Mississippi oral history, manuscripts, and civil war materials.
- The Gulf Coast Library, located on the Long Beach campus, is part of the University Libraries serving the Gulf Coast campuses (Gulf Park, Keesler, and Jackson County campuses). This state-of-the-art library is the only comprehensive university library on the Mississippi Gulf Coast.
- The Gunter Library is located at the Gulf Coast Research Laboratory (GCRL), Ocean Springs, MS campus. The Library provides technical information for the research staff, resident faculty and students, and visitors. Included are files of abstracts and reprints, books and journals, expedition reports, dissertations, and reference works. Special book collections support the academic program of the Laboratory.

=== Landmarks ===
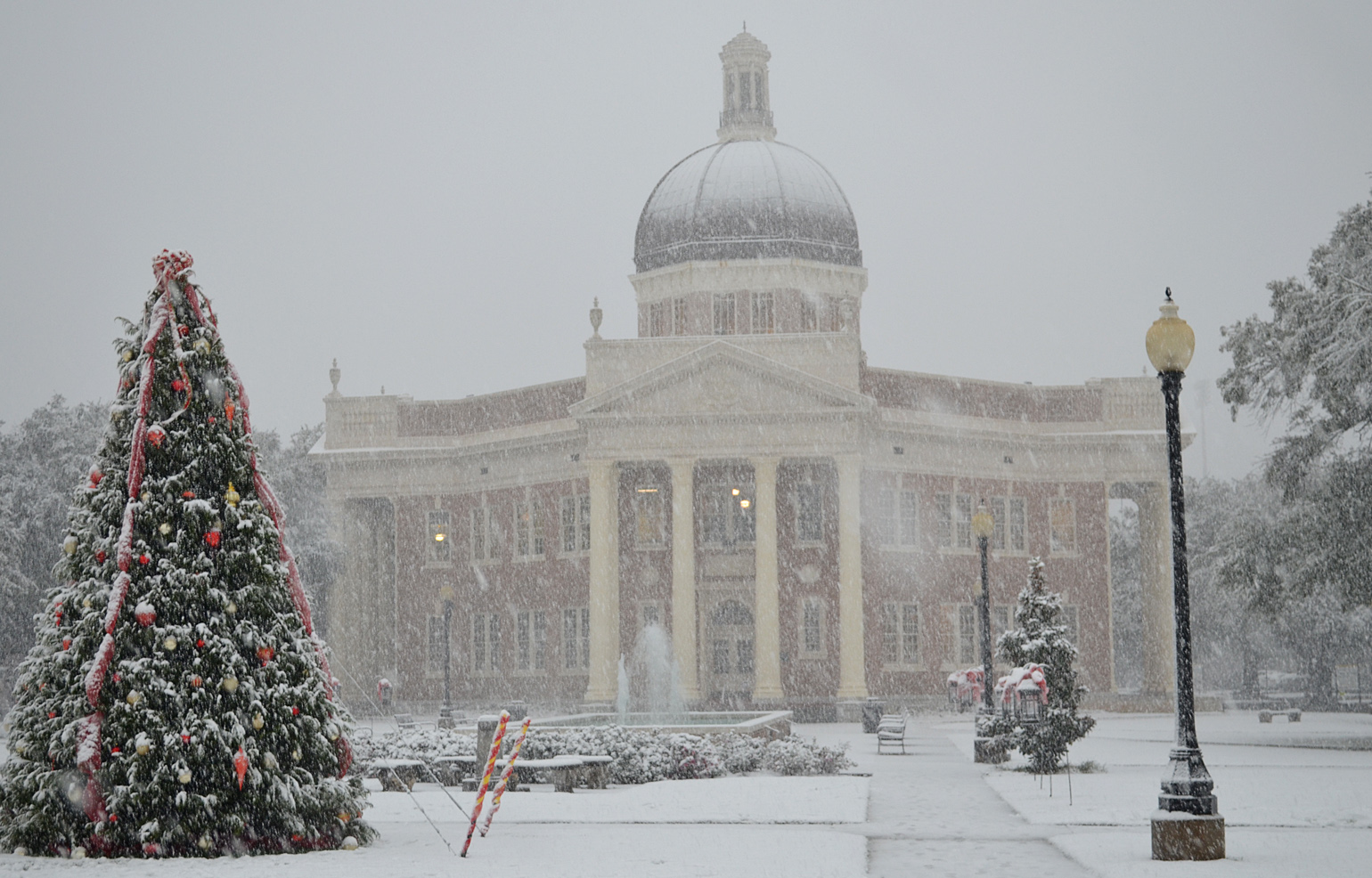
Aubrey K. Lucas Administration Building, the "Dome"

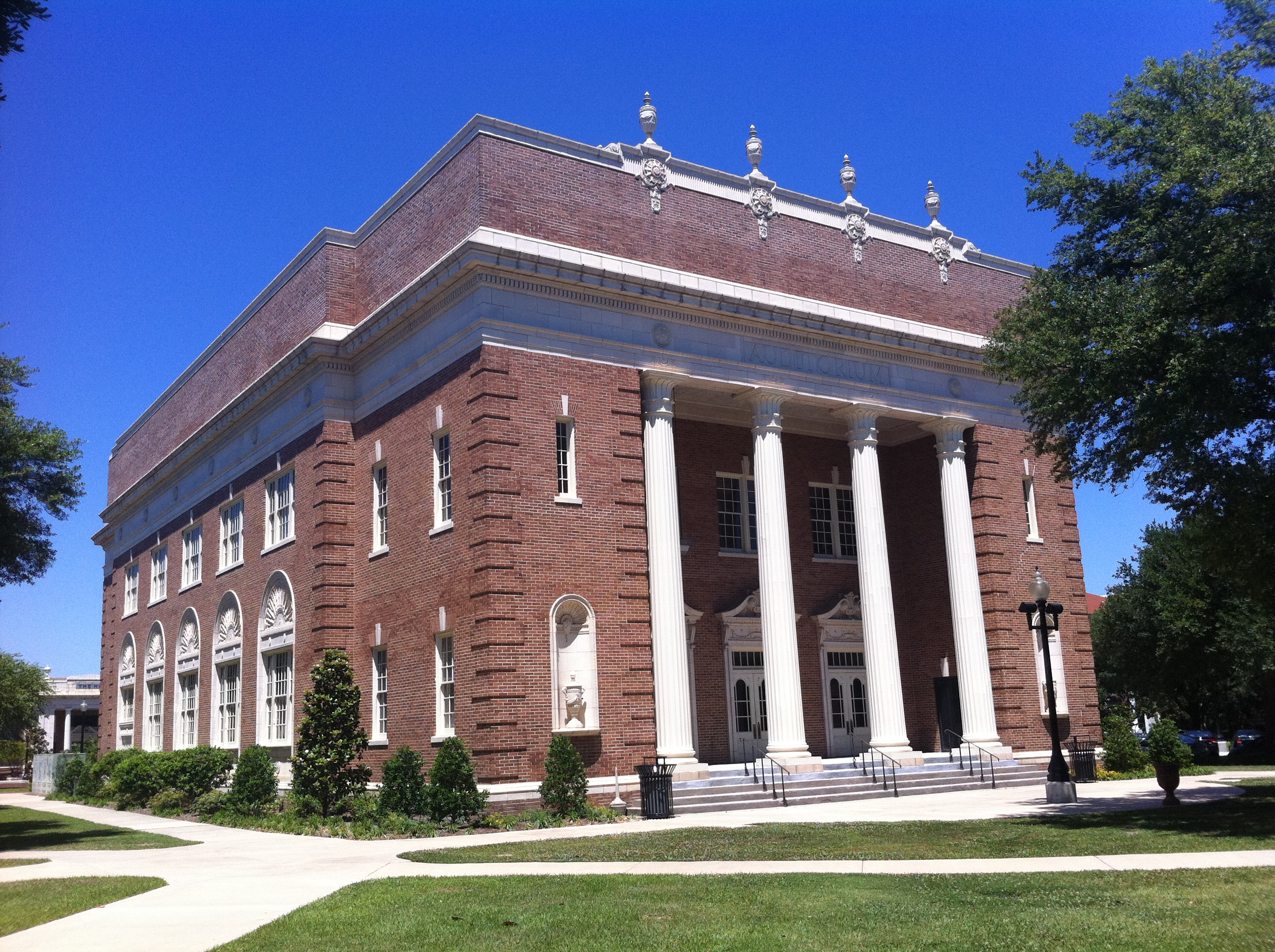
Bennett Auditorium

- The District is located near the intersection of US Highway 49 and Hardy Street. The historic district of campus is anchored by the five original buildings of the campus: Ogletree Alumni House, The Honor House, College Hall, Forrest Hall, and Hattiesburg Hall. It is also the traditional tailgating site for students during football season. It is home to Lake Byron, which has served as a focal point for many university activities and several weddings.
- The Century Gate is a brick and stone wall at the front of the university, between East and West Memorial Drive. It was built to commemorate the 100th anniversary of the university's founding in 1910. It displays the university seal, as well as the words "The University of Southern Mississippi."
- The All-American Rose Garden is one of two All-American Gardens in the state. The garden at Southern Miss was developed by the Hattiesburg Area Rose Society in 1972 through the leadership of the late William Wicht, a Hattiesburg resident who served as the first president of HARS. A memorial to Wicht's efforts to make the garden a reality is located next to the garden. Since its official dedication in 1974, the Southern Miss rose garden has received numerous awards for maintenance and display. Many a student has tried to impress his sweetheart by picking a rose, which if caught, carries a fine of up to 500 dollars.

The All-American Rose Garden is a rose garden found near Hardy Street on the campus of the University of Southern Mississippi. The garden has a semicircular form and contains many types of hybrid roses in 32 rose beds. It has existed since 1973 and was accredited the status 'Public Rose Garden' by the All-American Rose Selection Inc. in 1975. Many biologists and botanists come from all over the world to study the roses found in the rose garden. Due to the large number of rare roses in the rose garden, plucking out a rose is against college policy, and getting caught results in a fine of $500.

- The Eagle Walk is found underneath the upper deck of M.M. Roberts Stadium. Two hours prior to football game day, a cannon is fired, which begins the procession. ROTC, The Pride of Mississippi Marching Band, university officials, and football players make a march through this street to the cheers of thousands of fans. Every fall, the incoming freshman give the walls and street a "fresh coat of paint" as they have done for half a century.
- The Dome is a nickname for the Lucas Administration building found at the Hardy Street entrance to campus. It is so named due to the large cupola at the peak of the roof. Originally, it had an orange-copper color, which faded to a dull green over the years. In 2001, a restoration project was undertaken to paint the dome back to its original copper color. The Dome houses the offices of the president, vice president and other supporting staff.
- Shoemaker Square is an expanse of land formed near The Hub and the Walker Science Building Quad. The bricked fountain is focal point of the "Friday Night At the Fountain", a student-led pep rally prior to Saturday football games. The fountain has been tainted with soap suds by pranksters on many occasions.
- The Little Rock can be found in the historic district of campus. It is traditionally painted weekly and is used to promote various campus athletic, academic and fine art events. Occasionally, it can be found to be painted with logos of secret societies that exist on campus.
- The Eagle Statue, formally named "Lofty Return", is a massive three-ton sculpture of a Golden eagle, measuring 22 feet tall and 20 feet wide, and resting on an eight-foot-high pedestal. It stands behind Southern Hall, facing Hardy Street. A slightly smaller replica of it was also erected on the Gulf Park campus as a symbol tying the two campuses together.

== Academics ==
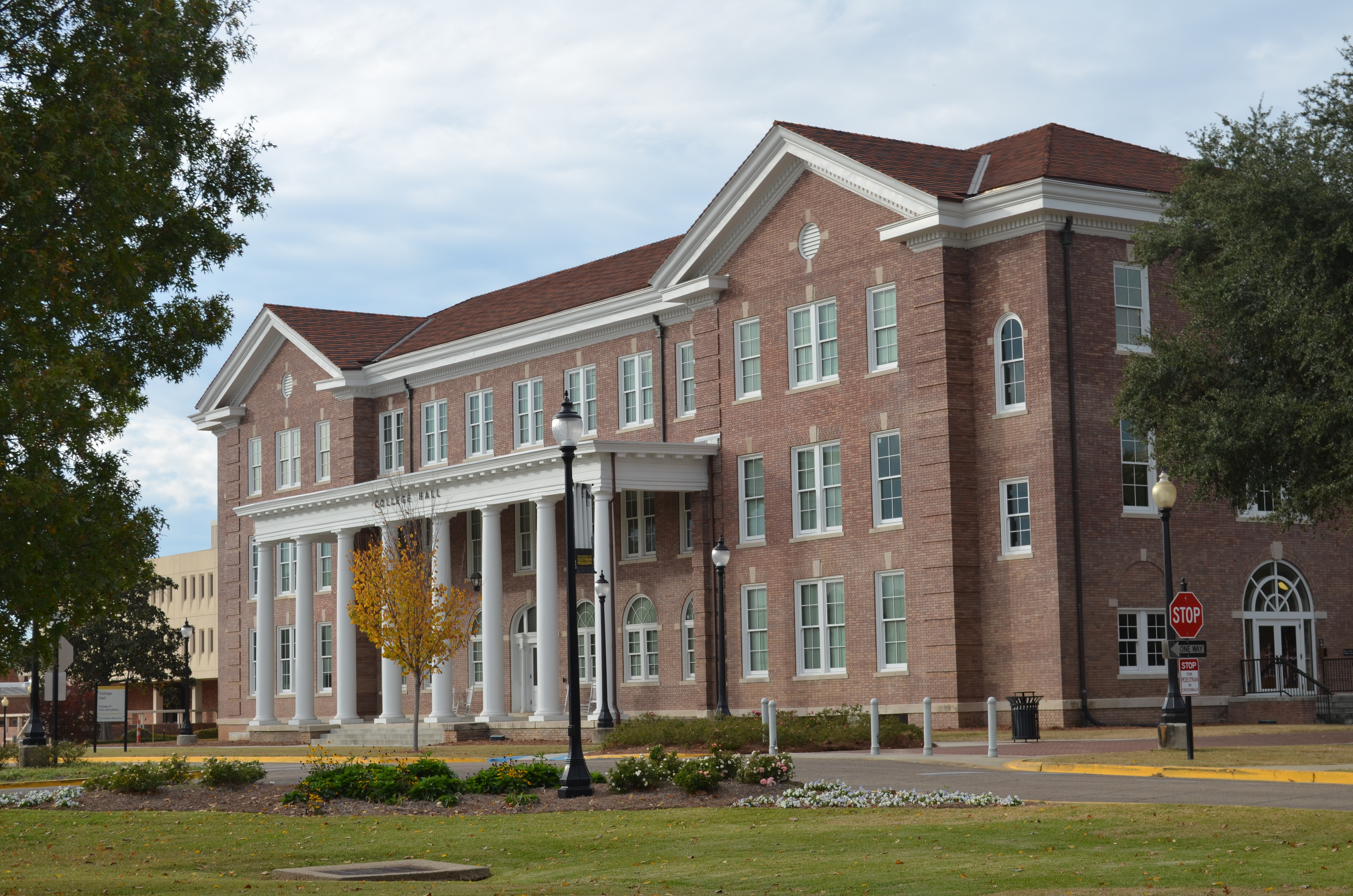
College Hall, one of the original structures

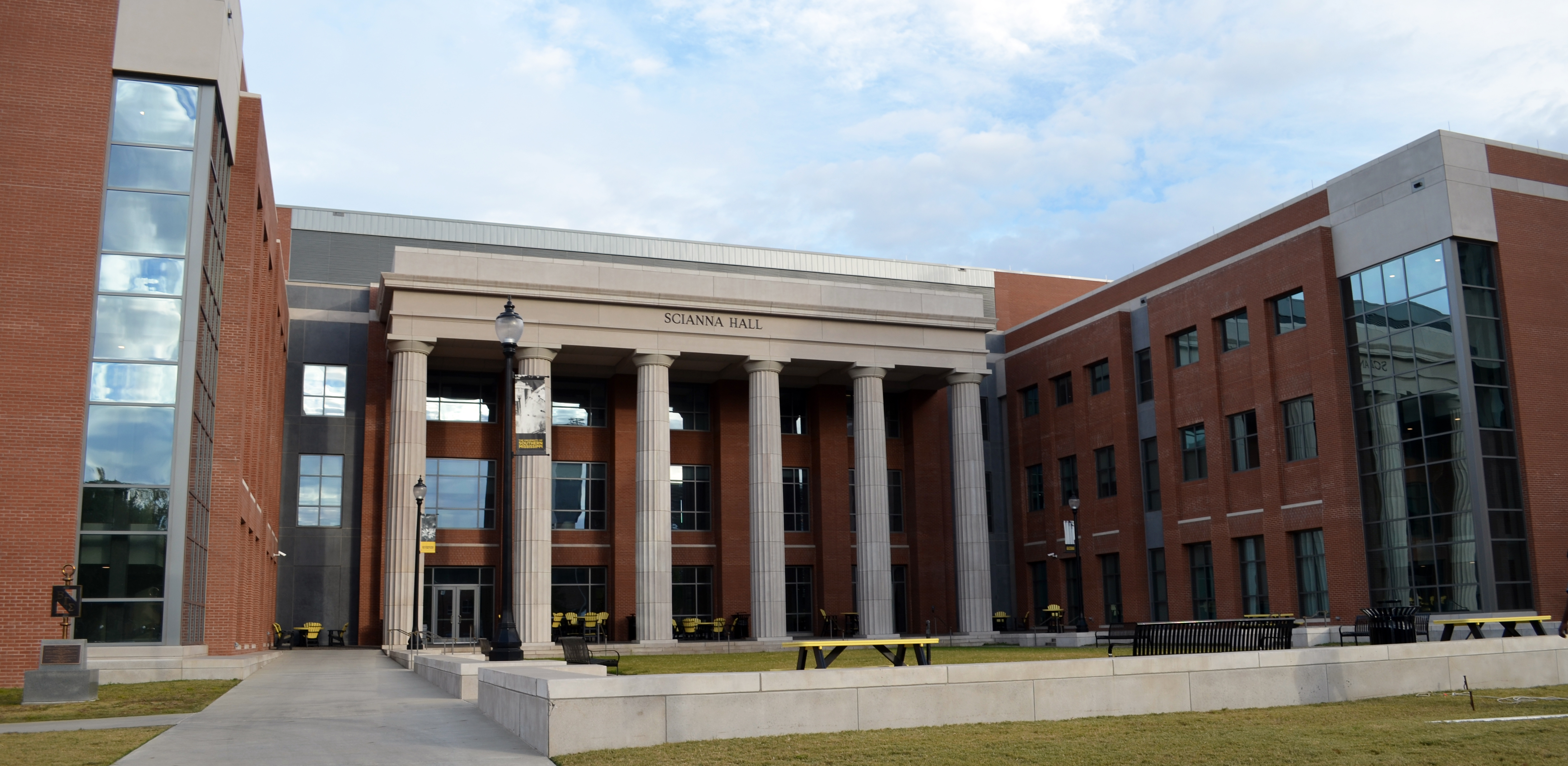
Scianna Hall, home of the College of Business and Economic Development

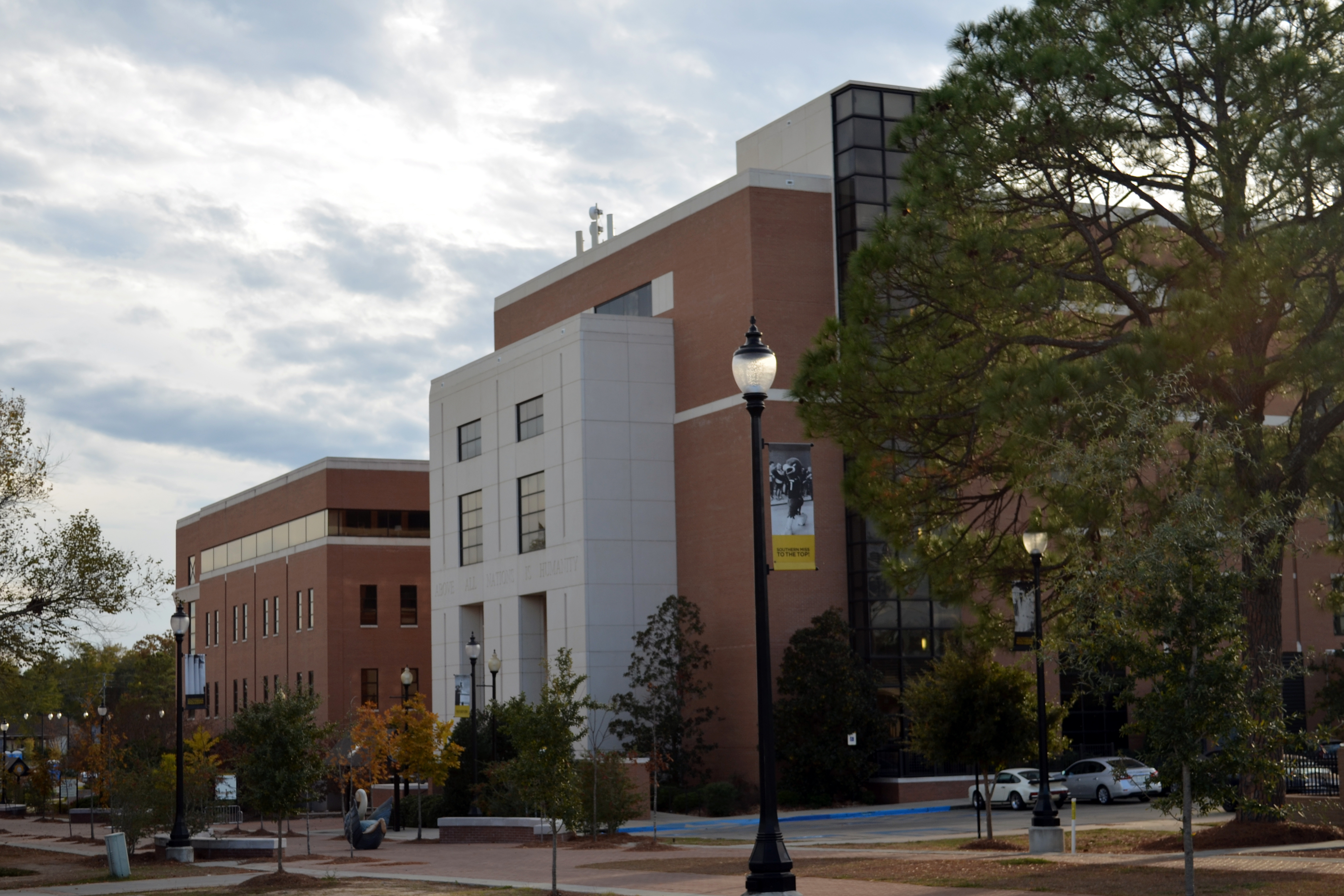
Liberal Arts Building (left) and International Center (right)

Southern Miss offers approximately 189 programs leading to baccalaureate, master's, specialist, and doctorate degrees. Southern Miss has traditionally drawn many of its students from Mississippi schools and community colleges, hailing from every county in Mississippi, though today the majority of undergraduates come from public schools across the southern United States and around the globe. The university is accredited by the Southern Association of Colleges and Schools and its programs are accredited by 30 state and national agencies.

The University of Southern Mississippi offers more than 250 clubs and organizations, as well as intramural athletics and special events. Student organizations at Southern Miss include the Student Government Association, The Legacy, The Student Printz (the biweekly student-produced newspaper), The Southerner (the yearbook), Southern Style (the university's student orientation team), national fraternities and sororities, honor societies, and various religious organizations. In addition, the school participates in the NCAA's Division I-FBS, and Sun Belt Conference featuring year-round athletics in 16 sports. Southern Miss also hosts, participates in, and promotes more than 300 cultural events every year. Regular events include the Jazz and Blues Festival held on the Long Beach campus, performances by the theater, dance and music departments, and exhibits presented by the art department. The university's Dale Center for the Study of War and Society hosts several lectures and programs throughout the year. Several guest lecturers including General David Petraeus (2017), Robert M. Gates (2014), and former Secretary of State Madeleine Albright (2010) visited Hattiesburg as a part of the center's Dale Distinguished Lecture Series. 2018 marked the 13th annual Richard McCarthy Lecture Series, wherein students and the community at large could participate in a broad range of events and programming from panel discussions to roundtables focusing on war and the effects it has on the societies surrounding it.

The University of Southern Mississippi is governed by the university president, along with the Mississippi Board of Trustees of State Institutions of Higher Learning. The president is the day-to-day administrator of Southern Miss, and is appointed by and responsible to the State Institutions of Higher Learning Board. Rodney D. Bennett became the tenth president of the university in April 2013, while the current president, Joseph S. Paul, began his position on November 1, 2022, after serving as interim president from July 16 through October 2022. Paul is an alumnus of Southern Miss (BA 1975, MA 1978), as well as the University of Alabama, where he earned a PhD in the administration of higher education administration. One goal of his administration is expansion of the Coastal campuses.

=== Colleges and schools ===
The University of Southern Mississippi recently began an academic reorganization changing the academic structure at the university and the roles of administrators. This plan reduced the number of colleges from six to four and consolidated traditional departments into thematic schools.

- College of Business and Economic Development
  - School of Accountancy
  - School of Finance
  - School of Management
  - School of Marketing
- College of Education and Human Sciences
  - School of Child and Family Sciences
  - School of Education
  - School of Kinesiology and Nutrition
  - School of Library and Information Science
  - School of Psychology
  - School of Social Work
- College of Nursing and Health Professions
  - School of Health Professions
  - School of Leadership and Advanced Nursing Practice
  - School of Professional Nursing Practice
  - School of Speech and Hearing Sciences
- College of Arts and Sciences
  - School of Biological, Environmental, and Earth Sciences
  - School of Communication
  - School of Computing Sciences and Computer Engineering
  - School of Construction and Design
  - School of Criminal Justice, Forensic Science, and Security
  - School of Humanities
  - School of Interdisciplinary Studies and Professional Development
  - School of Mathematics and Natural Sciences
  - School of Music
  - School of Ocean Science and Engineering
  - School of Performing and Visual Arts
  - School of Polymer Science and Engineering
  - School of Social Science and Global Studies

In addition to its academic colleges, The University of Southern Mississippi also offers the following programs:

- George R. Olliphant Honors College
- Graduate Studies
- International Studies Program
- Fully Online Programs in Sport Management (M.S.) and Sport Coaching Education (M.S.)
- DuBard School for Language Disorders
- Frances A. Karnes Center for Gifted Studies

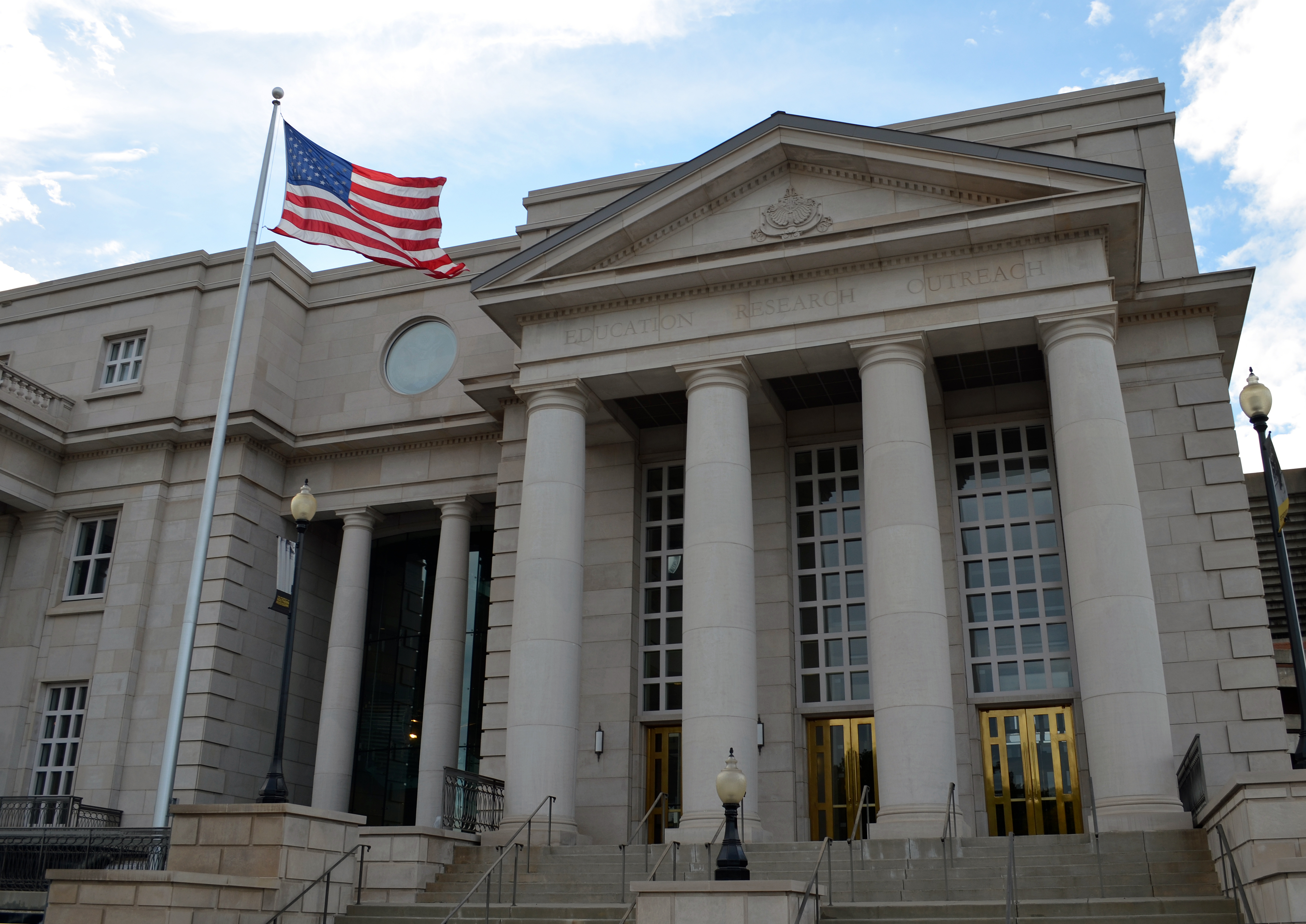
Trent Lott National Center for Excellence in Economic Development and Entrepreneurship

== Student life ==
Undergraduate demographics as of Fall 2023
Race and ethnicity	Total
White	57%
Black	28%
Hispanic	5%
Two or more races	4%
International student	3%
Asian	1%
Unknown	1%
Economic diversity
Low-income (Note: The percentage of students who received an income-based federal Pell grant intended for low-income students.)	47%
Affluent (Note: The percentage of students who are a part of the American middle class at the bare minimum.)	53%

Semesters at the university run from August to December and January to May, with a 10-week summer session. There are two four-week accelerated summer terms.

In 2006, The University of Southern Mississippi dedicated a 4-story, multimillion-dollar addition to its R.C. Cook University Union. The Thad Cochran Center now houses a 2-story Barnes & Noble bookstore, three ballrooms, a stadium-style theater, student organization offices, and Southern Miss Dining and Fresh Food Company. Several meeting rooms are within the union complex. The Union and Programs team hosts more than a thousand events each year.

In 2010, the University of Southern Mississippi opened Century Park (now known as Century Park North), a gated living community with four residence halls and a multi-purpose building containing a convenience store. In the 2014–15 school year, the university opened Century Park South, another gated living community with three residence halls and the campus's new student health center.

At nearly 300, Southern Miss's student organizations appeal to a wide spectrum of interests: Business, Education and Psychology, the Arts, Games and Athletics, Graduate Studies, Greek Life, Health and Human Sciences, Honors Societies, Liberal Arts, the Military, Religious Life, Residence Halls, Community Service, and Science and Technology. The largest organizations based on student membership include the: Student Government Association, African-American Student Organization, Southern Miss Activities Council, The Legacy Student Alumni Association, and Baptist Student Union.

=== Greek life ===
The university has 26 Greek organizations on campus, including 14 fraternities and 12 sororities. There are 19 fraternity and sorority houses.

=== Residential housing ===
The University of Southern Mississippi has 13 residence halls, and about 5,000 students live on campus throughout the school year.

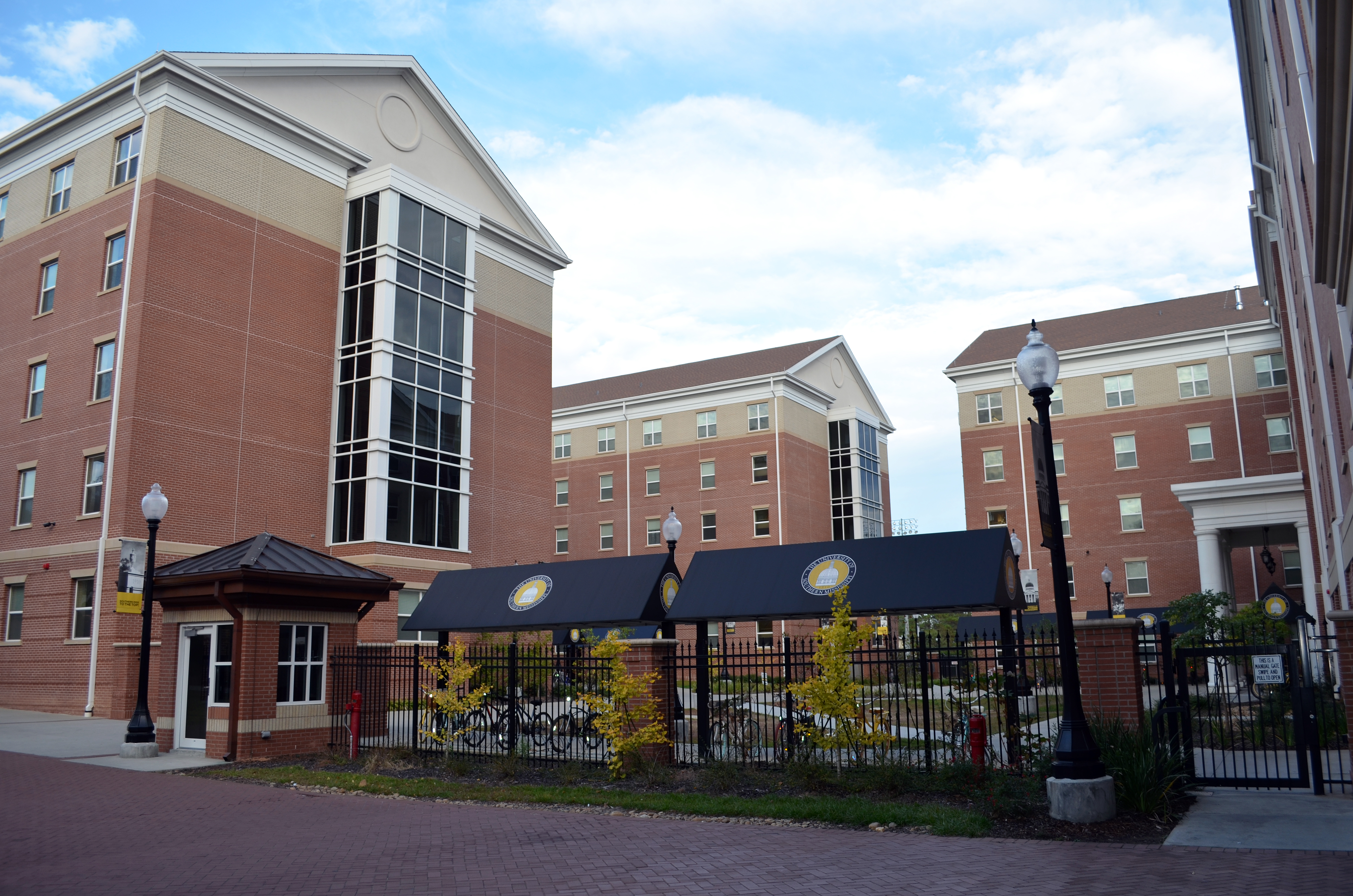
Century Park South dormitories

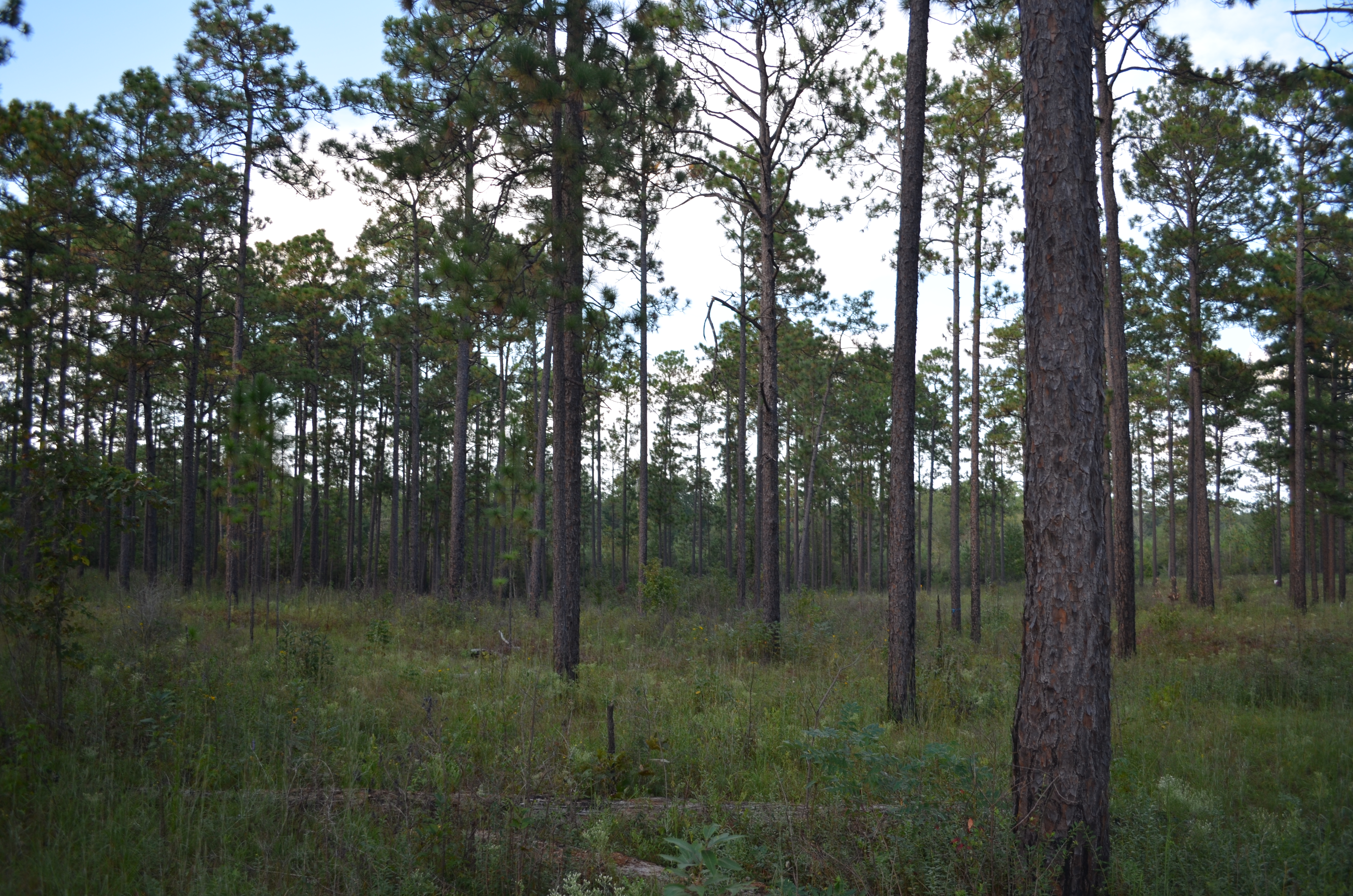
Restored, second-growth longleaf pine (Pinus palustris) savannah at USM's Lake Thoreau Environmental Center, located along the rails-to-trails Longleaf Trace which passes behind the Century Park dormitories

=== Publications and media ===
- Southern Miss Now is the official news source of the University Communications Office.
- The Student Printz is the university's student-run newspaper, published once weekly during the fall and spring semesters.
- The Southerner, the university's full-color yearbook publication, was discontinued in 2015.
- WUSM FM 88.5 is the 3000-watt Southern Miss public radio FM station, located on the first floor of Southern Hall.
- Mississippi Review is a quarterly published journal that features fiction, poetry, and essays. Gordon Weaver founded it in 1970. Frederick Barthelme became editor in 1977. In 1995, it was the first large literary magazine to launch a fully online issue. In 1998, its print version was published twice yearly, the online version, a separate publication, was published monthly except August by Center for Writers at The University of Southern Mississippi.
- The Drawl is a publication that highlights the traditions and history of Southern Miss. Incoming Golden Eagles are given a copy of The Drawl in their first week of school.
- The Talon is a quarterly magazine for alumni and friends of the university.
- Gulf and Caribbean Research is a peer-reviewed scientific journal focusing marine and coastal ecology, fisheries, and oceanographic studies from the Gulf of Mexico and Caribbean Sea. The journal is published in an online only format and is sponsored by USM libraries and the Gulf Coast Research Laboratory.

=== Mardi Gras holiday ===
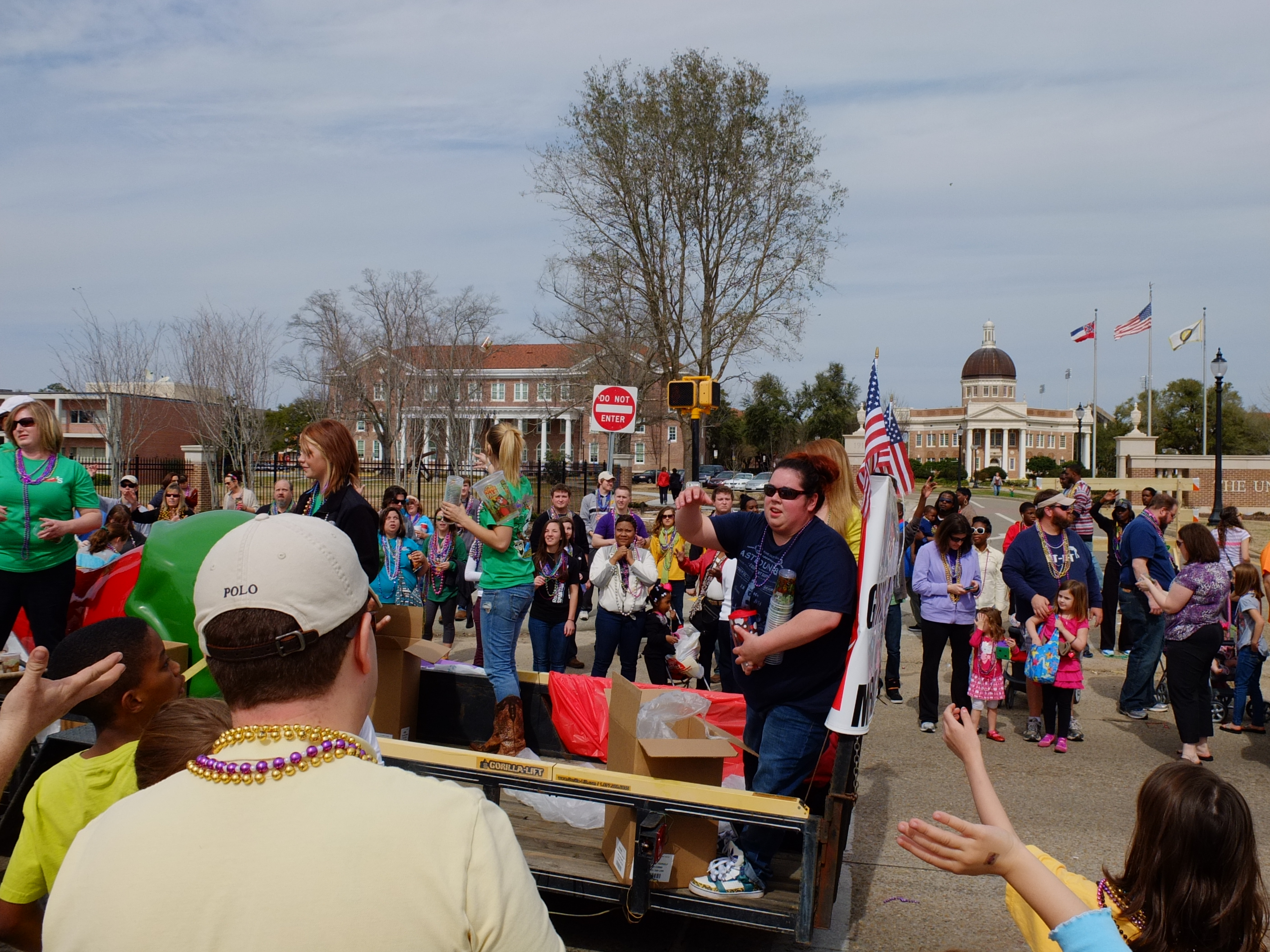
Mardi Gras parade on Hardy Street

The University of Southern Mississippi is one of the few universities in Mississippi to allow a two-day holiday each year for Mardi Gras. The university does not hold classes on the Monday and Tuesday before Ash Wednesday.

In the late 1970s and early 1980s, many USM students expressed a desire for the holiday. The university is near New Orleans and has ties to Biloxi and Mobile, where Mardi Gras is also celebrated. In 1981, Ken Stribling, president of USM's student body, organized a student drive to establish an annual holiday on Fat Tuesday (Mardi Gras). The university's Calendar Committee refused the request, but Stribling appealed to USM President Aubrey Lucas. At an annual Christmas celebration at USM in December 1981, Lucas announced that USM would try the holiday on Fat Tuesday in 1982 to see how it worked. Stribling appealed again in 1982, and Lucas allowed the holiday for Fat Tuesday in 1983. The next year, the holiday for Fat Tuesday was made a permanent part of the university's calendar.

The university's student government in 2003 gained addition of the Monday before Ash Wednesday as part of the Mardi Gras Holiday, creating a two-day holiday for the event and a four-day weekend for students. While many USM students attend Mardi Gras celebrations, most use the four-day weekend to prepare for midterm exams or visit family and friends. The novelty of Mardi Gras Holiday has become a recruiting tool.

== Athletics ==
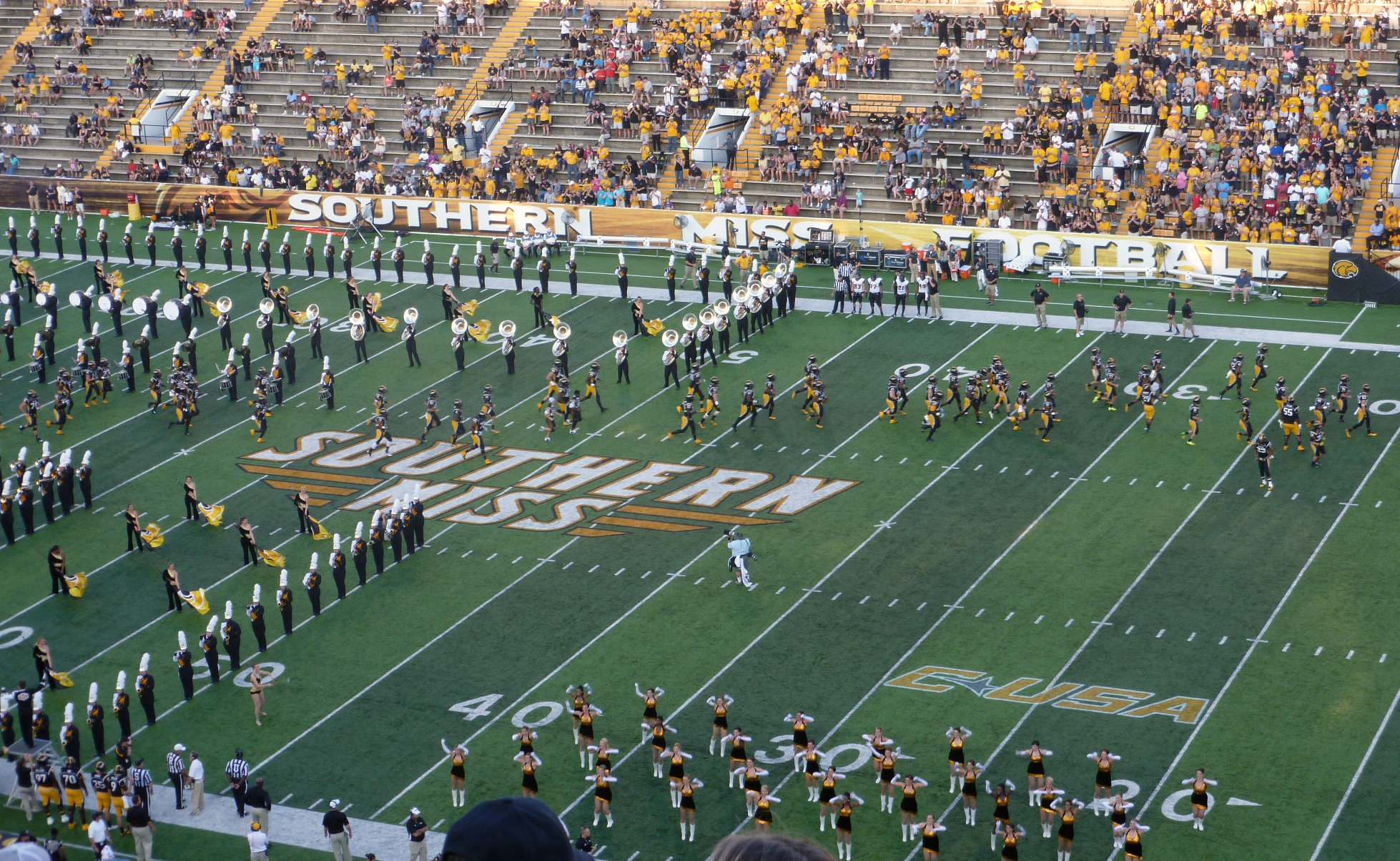
M. M. Roberts Stadium

The Golden Eagles have excelled in all areas of athletics. Southern Miss has captured national titles twice in football and three times in track and field. In 2011, the Golden Eagle football team finished as the No. 19 team in the Associated Press (AP) College Poll. The Golden Eagle football team has also competed in twenty-four bowl games throughout the course of the program's history. Twelve of these bowl games have resulted in a victory for the Golden Eagles. On November 13, 1982, the Golden Eagle football team upset Alabama's Crimson Tide in famed coach Bear Bryant's last home game in Tuscaloosa. M.M. Roberts Stadium is the home of the Golden Eagle football team and can hold up to 36,000 fans. The Golden Eagle baseball team are two-time Conference USA champions and have been invited to twelve regional NCAA tournaments and also a trip to the College World Series. The Golden Eagle baseball team has the No. 3 recruiting class in the country by Baseball America. University of Southern Mississippi baseball hosted the 2022 NCAA baseball regionals at Hill Denson Field at Pete Taylor Park, as well as the MHSAA softball championships at HawkinsBarker field. The Southern Miss basketball team is a one-time champion of the NIT tournament.

== Fine arts ==
The University of Southern Mississippi is the only institution within the state, and one of a dozen universities in America, to be accredited in all four fine arts emphasis areas: art, dance, theatre and music. It operates the Southern Miss Wind Ensemble and the USM Symphony Orchestra, which has enjoyed soloists such as singers Renee Fleming and Ray Charles, cellist Yo-Yo Ma, violinist Itzhak Perlman, violinist Joshua Bell, flautist James Galway, clarinetist Anthony McGill, trumpet player Doc Severinsen, and tenor Plácido Domingo. The Southern Chorale has become nationally and internationally recognized. They recently performed at Carnegie Hall in New York City and performed at various concerts in Norway and Sweden. The Southern Miss Pride of Mississippi Marching Band has performed at such events as the inauguration of President Jimmy Carter and Macy's Thanksgiving Day Parade in New York in November 2010. The Department of Theatre and Dance has been active in the Kennedy Center/American College Theatre Festival at times, placing first in various areas of the national competition. Several productions from USM have been selected for performance at the Region IV (Southeast) festival; two productions (Catfish Moon & The Rimers of Eldritch) were invited to the national KC/ACTF festival at the Kennedy Center in Washington, D.C.

== Alumni and faculty ==
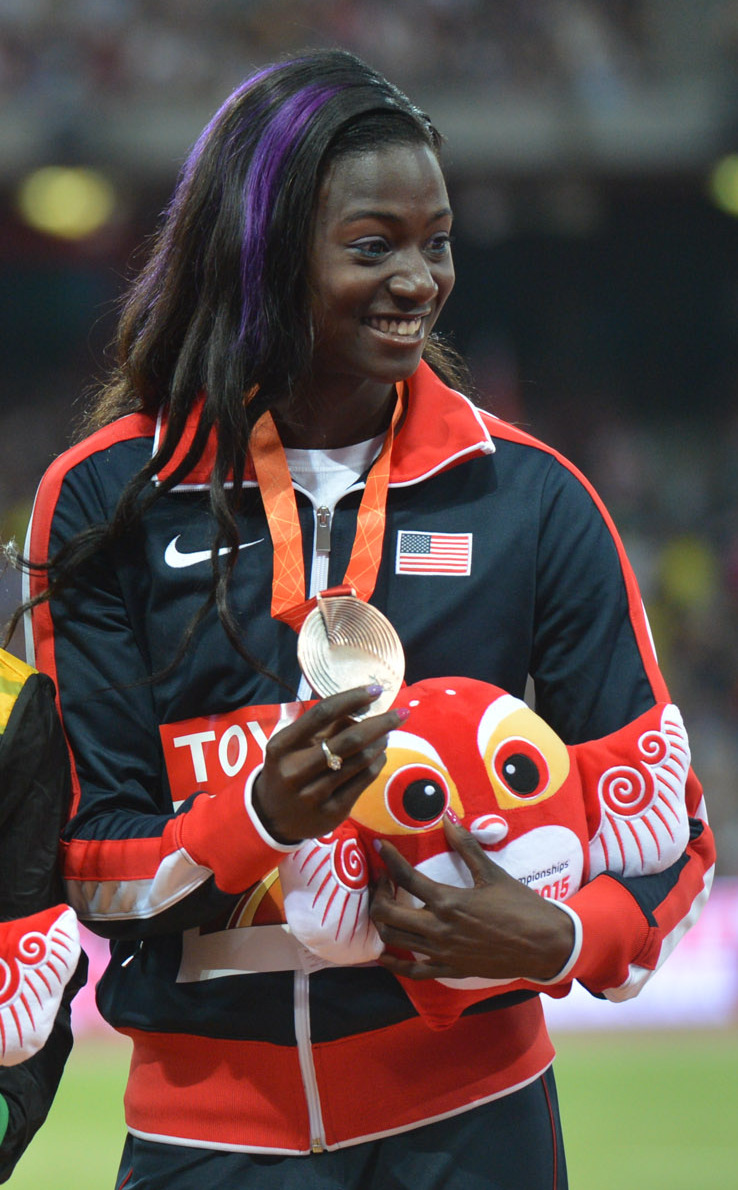
Tori Bowie,
track & field Olympic gold medalist

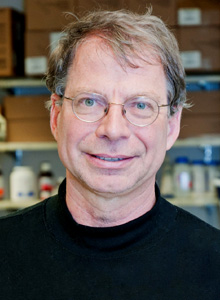
Roger Brent,
cell and molecular biologist

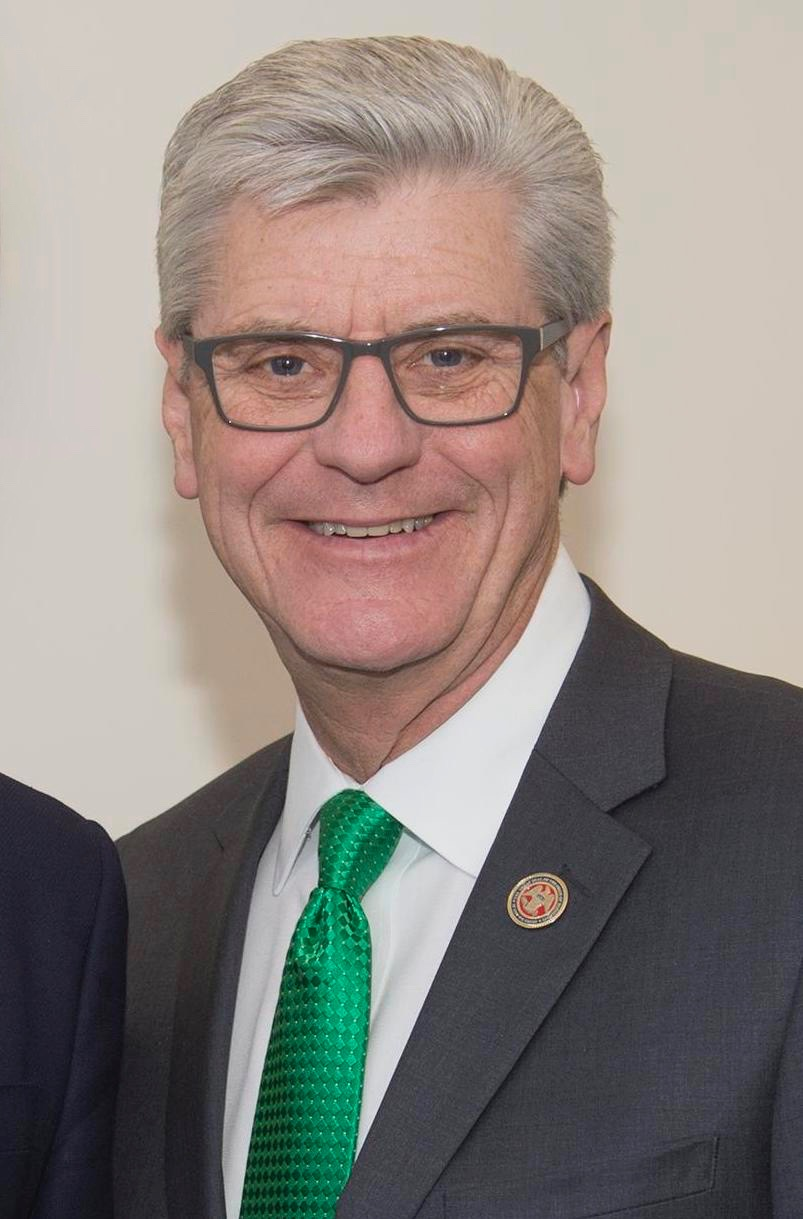
Phil Bryant,
governor of Mississippi, 2012–2020

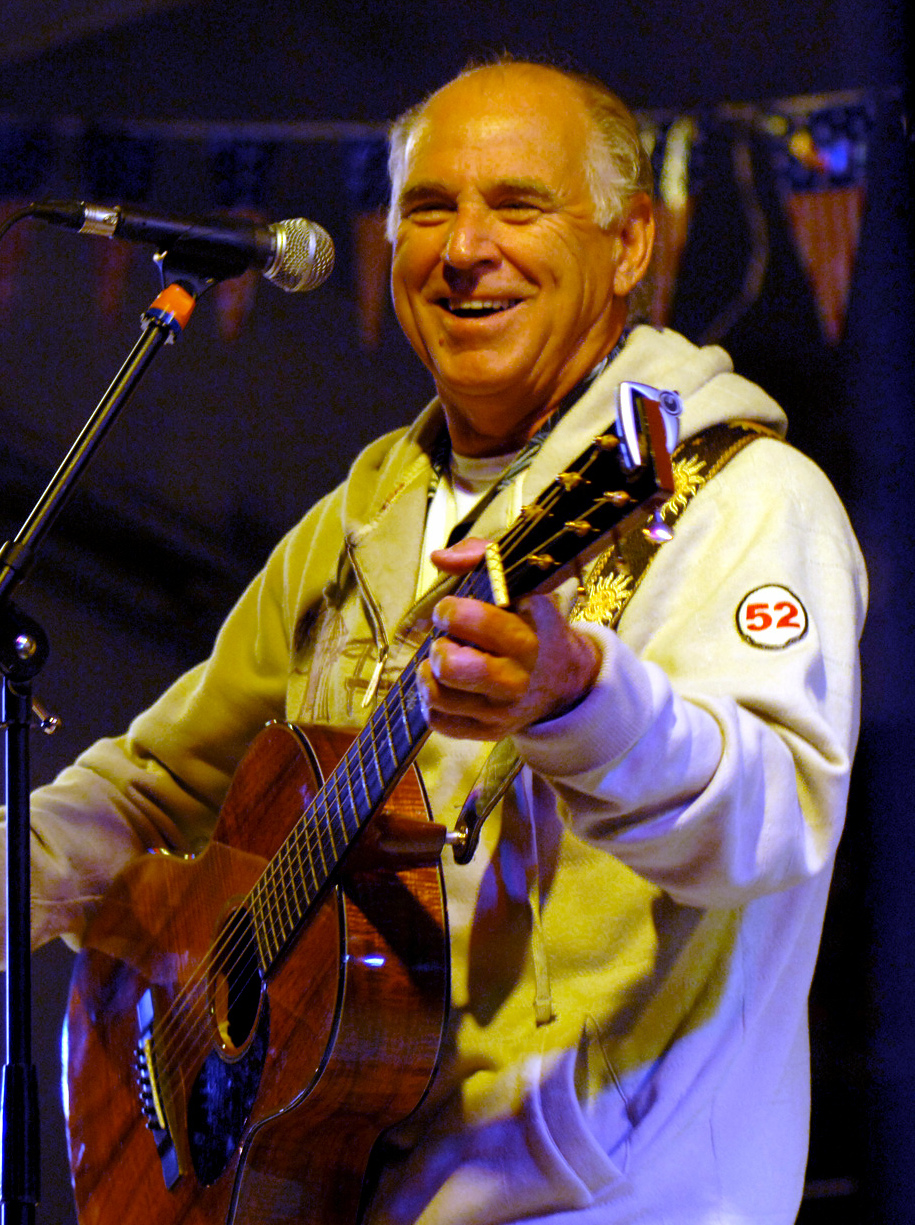
Jimmy Buffett,
popular singer-songwriter

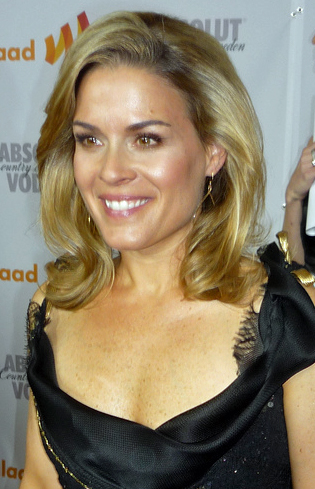
Cat Cora,
chef, Iron Chef America

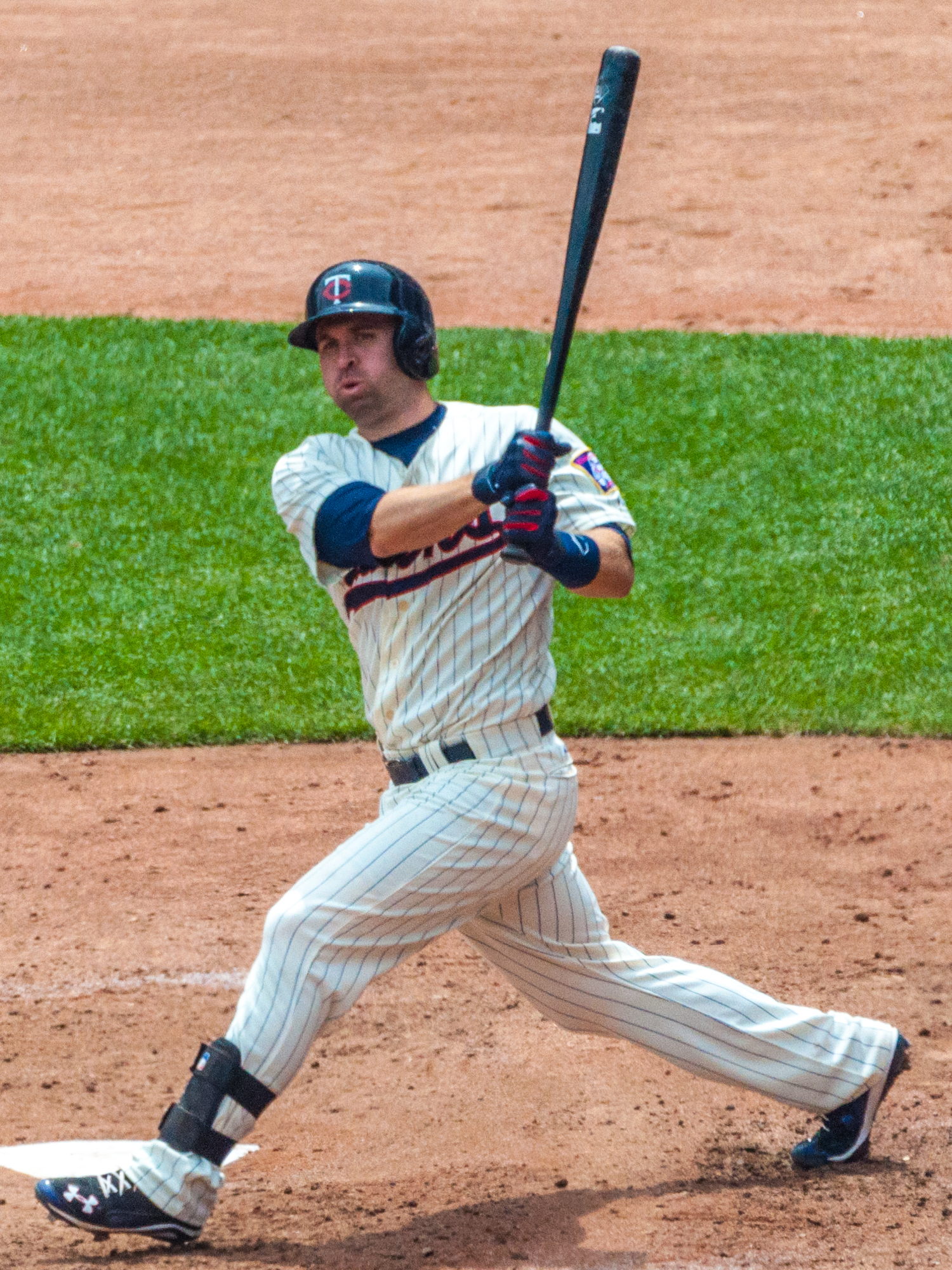
Brian Dozier,
baseball player, 2015 All-Star

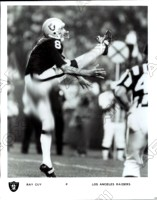
Ray Guy,
American football player, punter, NFL Hall of Fame

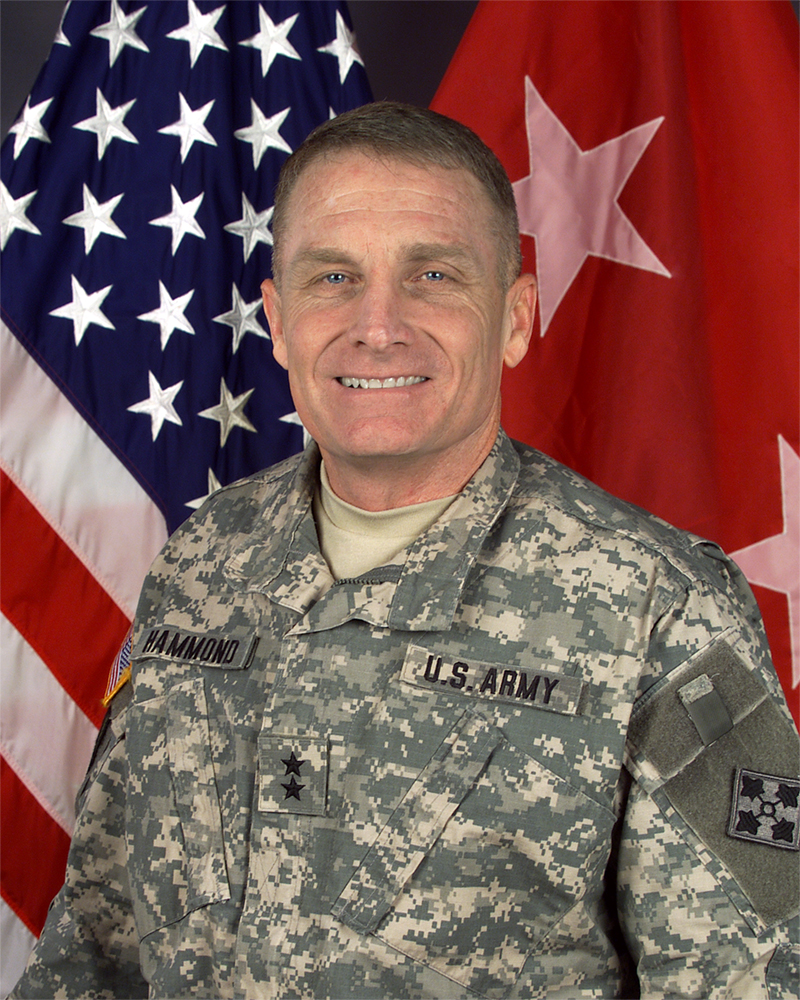
Jeffery Hammond,
major general (retired), U.S. Army

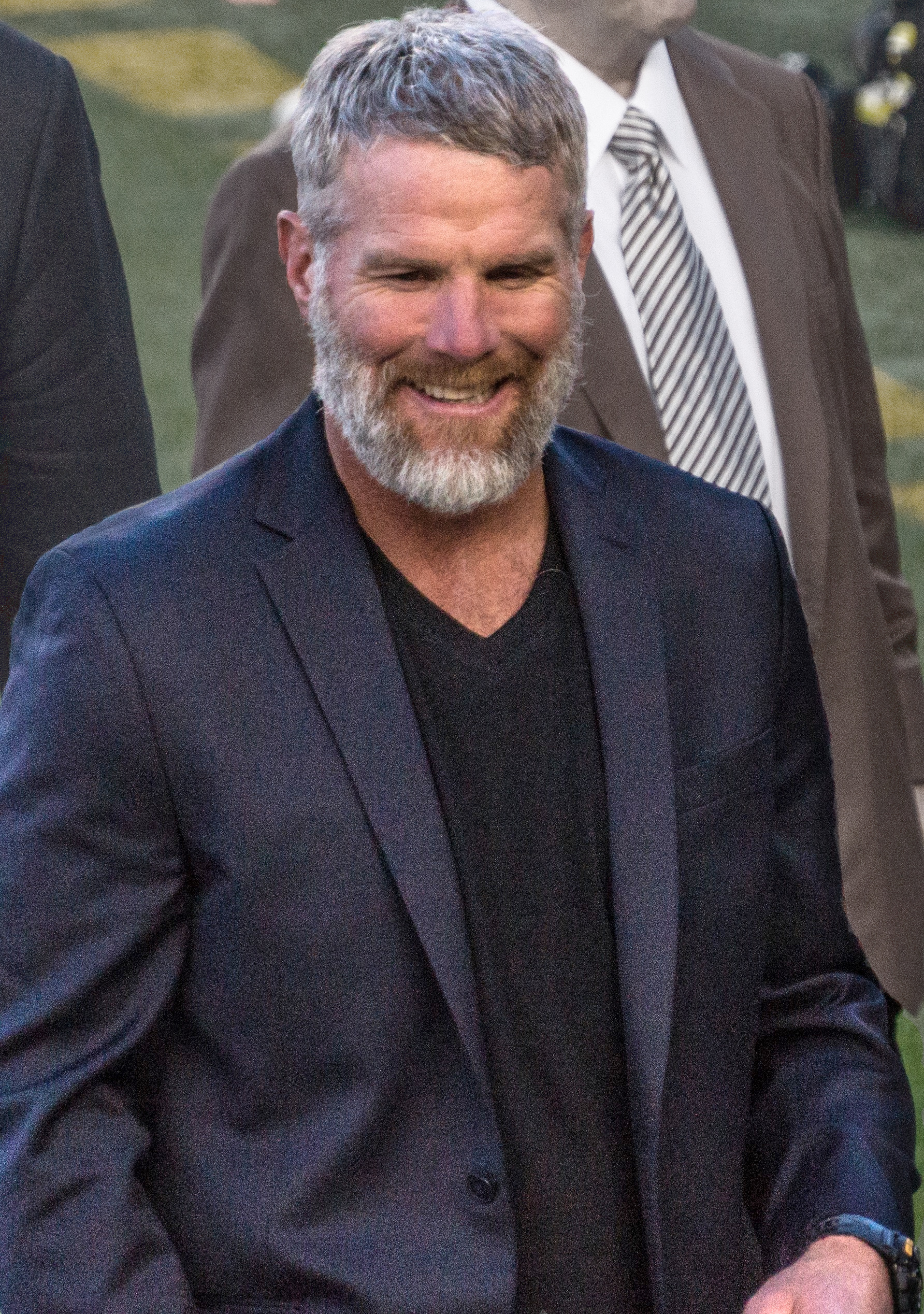
Brett Favre,
American football player, 11-time Pro Bowler, Hall of Fame

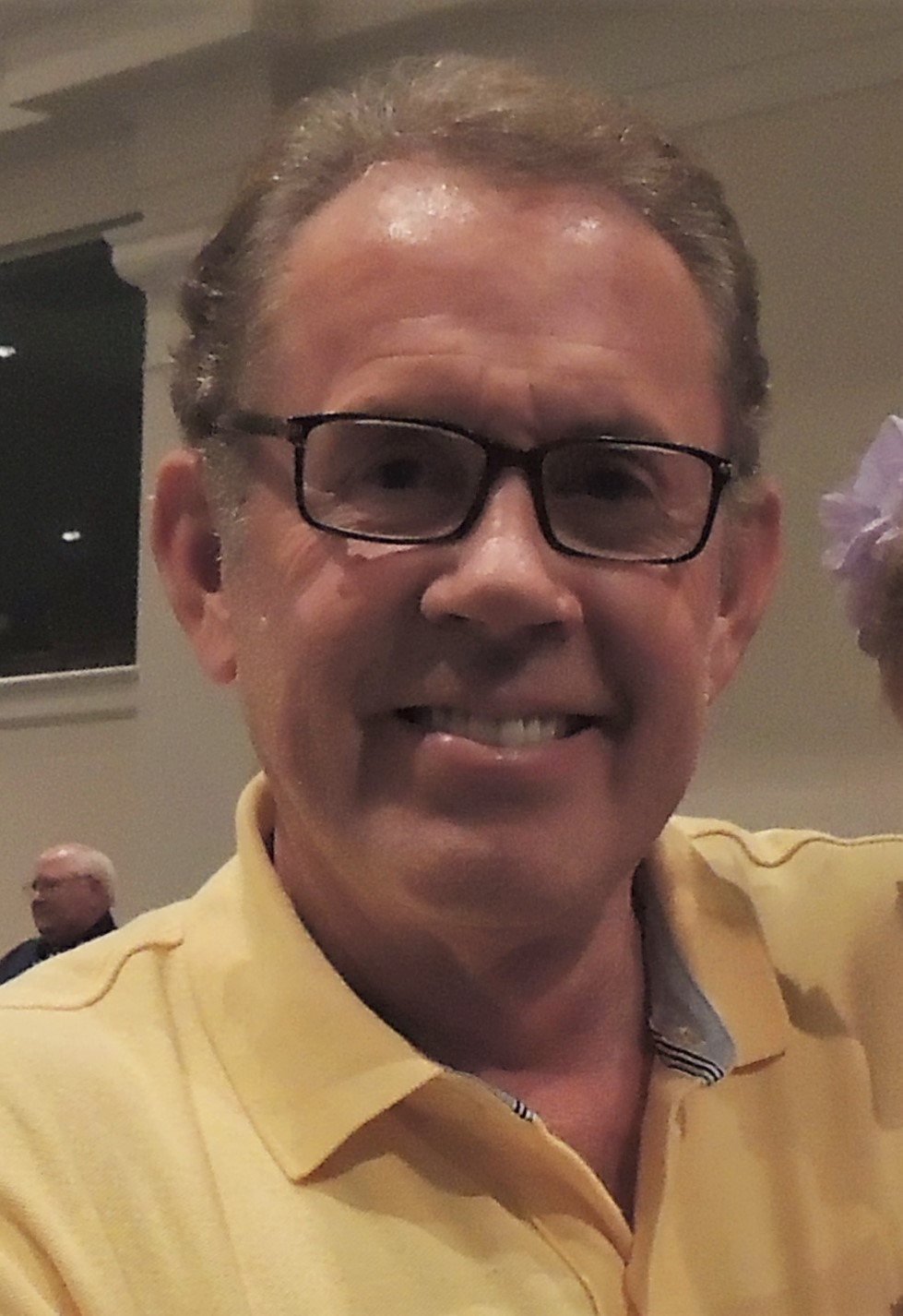
Gary Grubbs,
film and television actor

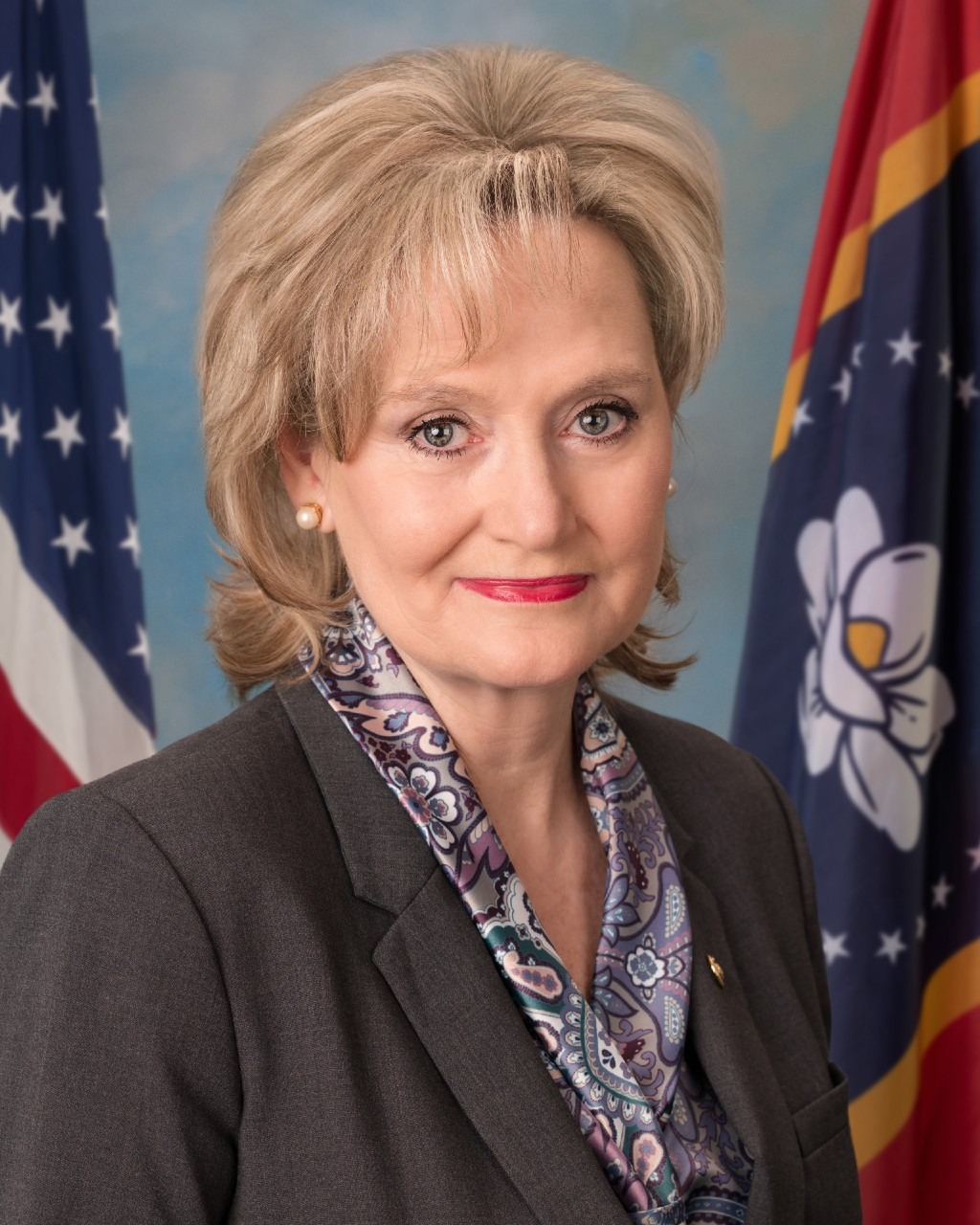
Cindy Hyde-Smith,
member of United States Senate, 2018–present

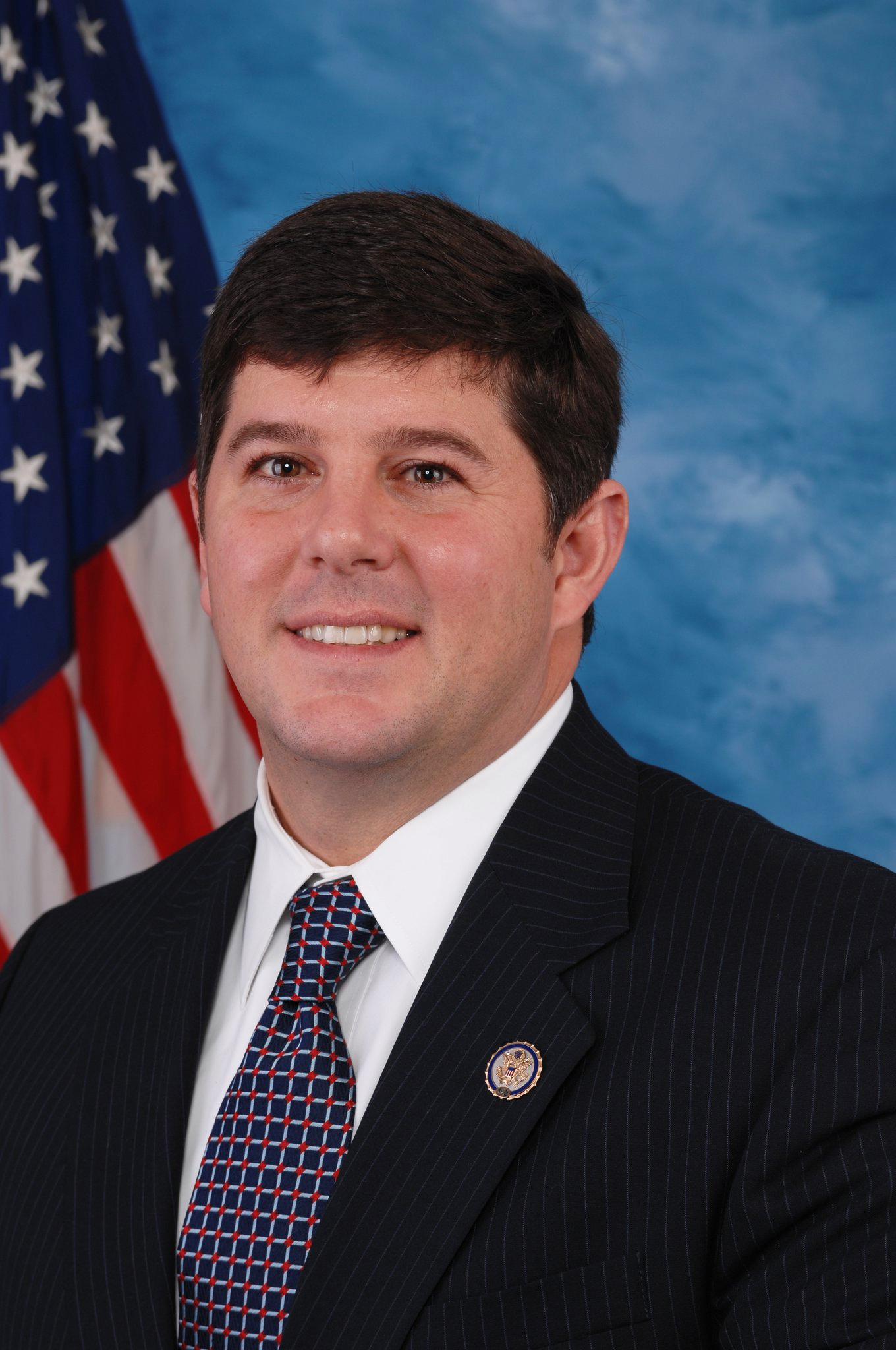
Steven Palazzo,
member of U.S. House of Representatives, 2011–2023

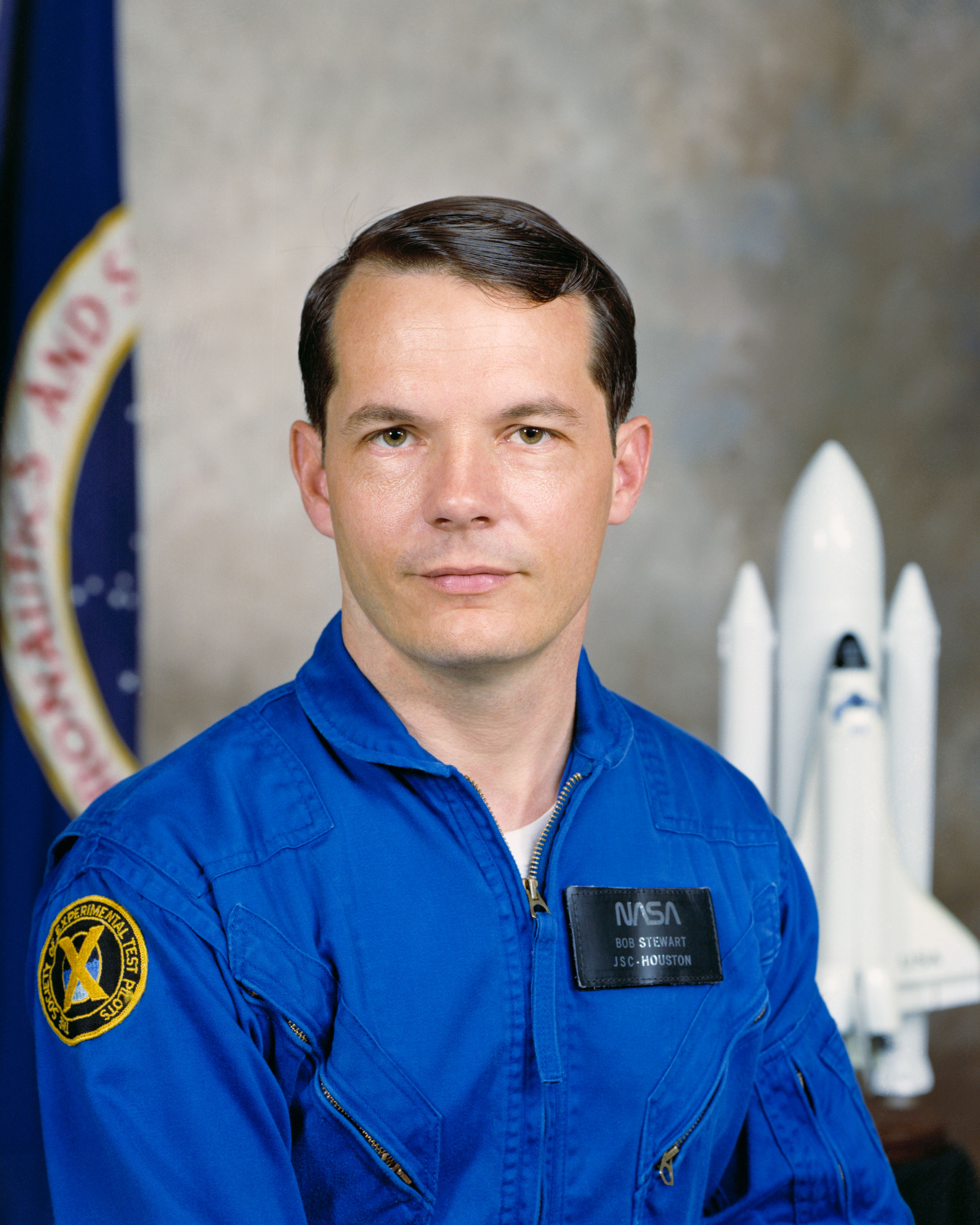
Robert L. Stewart,
astronaut

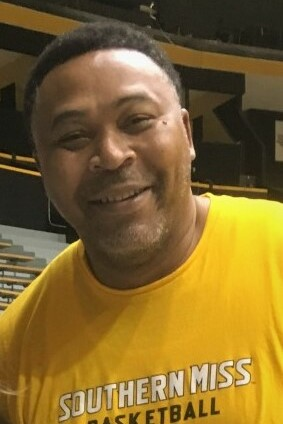
Clarence Weatherspoon,
basketball player, NBA

== See also ==
- Institute of Child Nutrition
