= Richard E. Holmes =

American medical doctor and civil rights activist (1944–2026)

Holmes on the campus of Mississippi State University in 2016.

Richard Earl Holmes (February 17, 1944 – October 16, 2026) was an American medical doctor who specialized in emergency medicine. As a third-year college student, in 1965 he enrolled in the previously segregated Mississippi State University (MSU). He was one of five black Mississippians who pioneered the effort to desegregate the major state universities of Mississippi as part of the Civil Rights Movement. Following passage of the Civil Rights Act of 1964, his enrollment was the most peaceful of these efforts to that point.

Holmes completed his college degree and graduated from MSU. After service in the United States Army, he also earned a master's degree in microbiology and nutrition, and a medical degree, the latter at Michigan State University. Holmes practiced emergency department medicine in hospitals in Birmingham, Alabama. In 2003 he returned to MSU to become a staff physician at the university's health center. He received considerable recognition related to the 40th anniversary of his landmark enrollment and graduation from the university.

== Early life and education ==
Holmes was born in Chicago, Illinois, on February 17, 1944, to Horace and Minnie Holmes. He had three older brothers. When Richard was 18 months old, he and his brothers were taken to Mississippi by their mother when the parents separated. They settled in Starkville, Mississippi, with Eliza Hunter, a family friend Holmes would consider his grandmother. Hunter promoted education, hard work, honesty and religion for the boys, teaching them that "being poor and black was no reason for failure".

Before Hunter died in 1956, at the age of 86, she arranged for Holmes (then aged 12) to live with Dr. Douglas Conner and his wife. He was a local Starkville physician, African-American community leader and civil rights activist. Conner became Holmes's godfather and life mentor, encouraging the youth to stay in school and study hard.

When Holmes graduated in 1963 from Starkville's black-only Henderson High School, Dr. Conner sent him to Wiley College. Holmes took pre-med courses during the two years he studied there. Wiley is a private, historically black college in Marshall, Texas; many of its students and faculty were active in the civil rights movement in Texas.

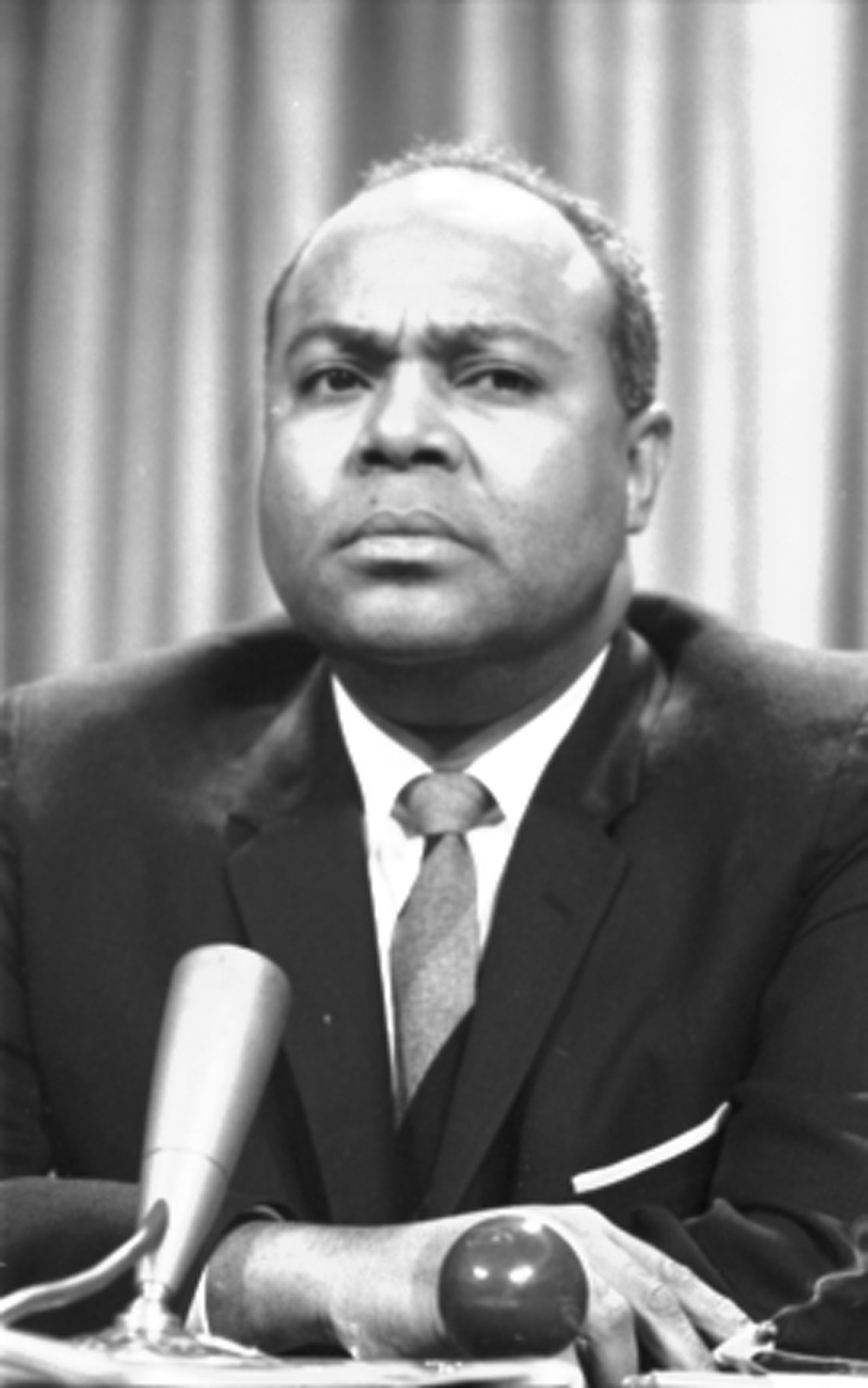
James Farmer

Civil rights leaders James L. Farmer Sr. and his son James Farmer (who was director of CORE when Holmes was at Wiley) both had connections to Wiley. Holmes was influenced by mentors who exemplified the philosophy of persistent but conservative, gradual expansion of civil rights, along with the need for racial reconciliation.

== Civil rights activism and integration ==
Holmes may have questioned why he was studying at Wiley in Texas when MSU was located in his hometown. He likely had some concern for his safety considering the violence that had greeted Clyde Kennard (imprisoned on false grounds and dying) and James Meredith (placed in danger of his life during riots) when they attempted to integrate Mississippi universities.

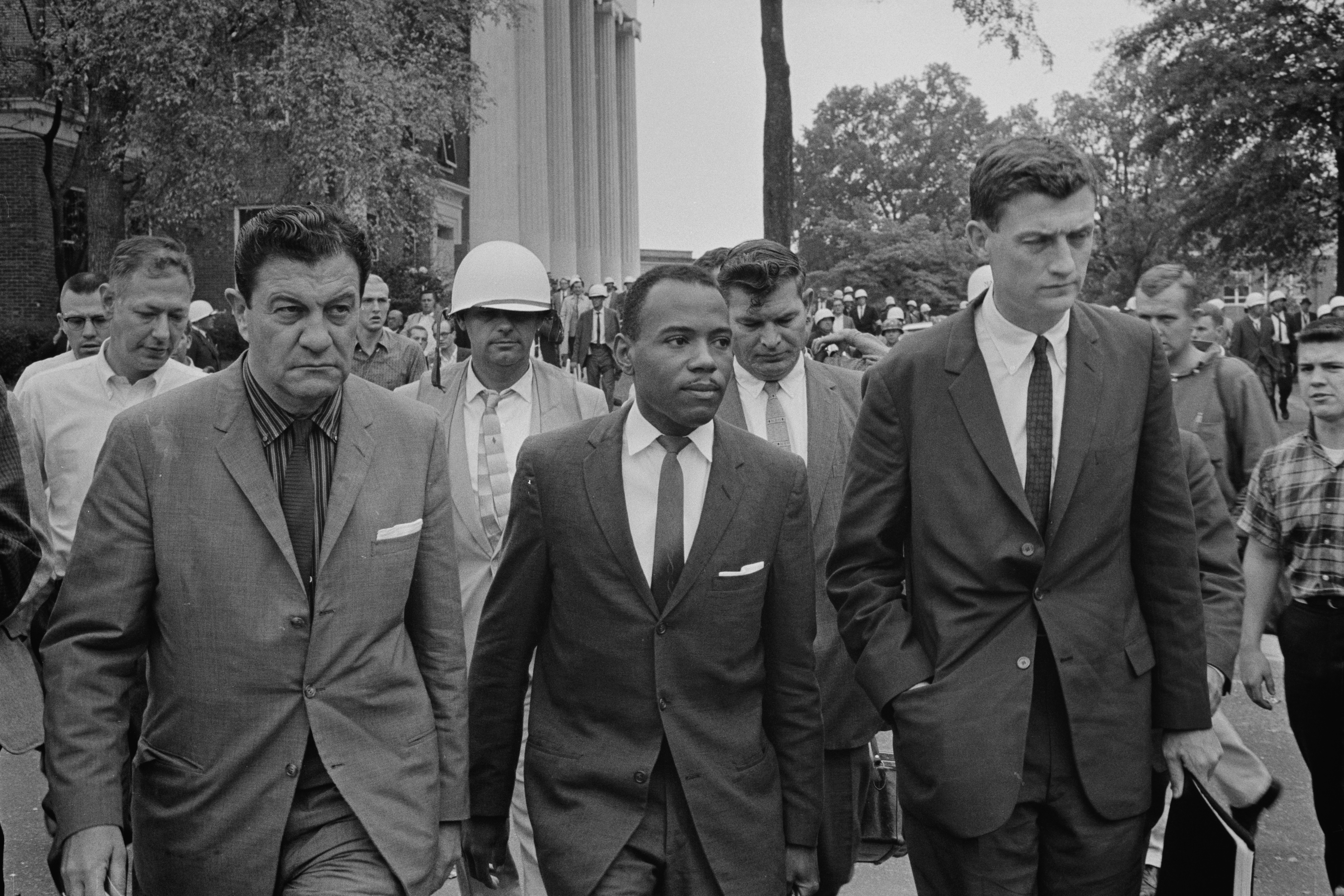
James Meredith walking to class at the University of Mississippi, accompanied by U.S. Marshals.

In 1960 Clyde Kennard had been imprisoned on false charges by the Mississippi State Sovereignty Commission and the administration of president William David McCain when trying to integrate the University of Southern Mississippi. White segregationists erupted into riots on the campus of the University of Mississippi in 1963 when a federal court ordered that James Meredith be admitted. Governor Ross Barnett had gained political points in the state for his refusal to concede, and President John F. Kennedy authorized National Guard troops to quell the rioting and protect Meredith.

It is not documented as to how Holmes became the first black student to enroll at Mississippi State. His decision likely had several origins: himself, perhaps his mentor Dr. Conner, the local NAACP, President Dr. Dean W. Colvard and members of the university administration, and friends and mentors at Wiley. The NAACP had sponsored such efforts before; two months later they supported the enrollments of Raylawni Branch and Gwendolyn Elaine Armstrong at the University of Southern Mississippi.

By 1965, both liberals and segregationists in the Mississippi higher education community began to work toward integration. The Colvard administration was moderate for its time and place. In 1963, Dr. Colvard had been courageous enough to send his regional champion basketball team to the integrated NCAA championships, rejecting the desire by the white state political establishment to keep them out of the games because of racial issue. In 1965, Colvard, his staff, and the faculty were seeking a path to peaceful integration.

He enrolled for summer semester in July, when the fewest people would be on campus. He told the admissions office that he had come only for the one summer semester and would return to Wiley in the fall. He was always quiet and courteous, working to prevent any potential objections. He still says, "I didn't set out to be an integrationist."

Holmes later said of the first day: "There were no catcalls, no racial slurs. It was quiet and serene. Nothing happened; there was just curiosity and disbelief." He learned that the white students would refuse to sit at the same table with him in the library and student cafeteria, so he suffered from isolation. He encountered occasional heckling, but said that it did not seem to be personal. "Some befriended me and treated me with dignity and respect. Many just ignored me."

After a successful summer semester and few problems, Holmes was personally encouraged by the Colvard administration to return for the fall semester, which he did. Also, Dr. Conner and other black members of the university and Starkville community asked Holmes to stay, saying his presence was critical to a potential black student considering enrollment. Dr. Dean W. Colvard and the faculty were supportive. The student body, overall, treated Holmes well.

The university arranged for Holmes to have a twin-bed room in the new and (comparatively) luxurious Evans Hall residence facility, normally reserved for graduate students. His greatest struggle was with the isolation enforced by white students. Most of his friends from Starkville were attending college somewhere else. Students at MSU were reluctant to have an open friendship with him because of the lingering pressure of Mississippi "closed society" norms. He missed the extracurricular activities which he had been involved in at Wiley. There he had been active in Kappa Alpha Psi fraternity and the football program. He sometimes wished he could have continued that.

Many students were likely unaware of the landmark occasion. In the fall, a Mexican-American transfer student from Tucson, Arizona, arrived at the campus Baptist Student Union for a Thanksgiving service. She said to the minister that she had seen another Mexican on campus whom she might invite to the BSU and described Holmes. "Oh no!" he [the minister] replied, "that's the Negro student who's integrating us. But, I think he's Methodist."

For the next two years, Holmes worked diligently toward a bachelor's degree in liberal arts. Needing an income, Holmes left full-time student status in 1967 to teach school nearby in Alabama. Continuing on part-time status with night and correspondence courses, he graduated with a B.A. in 1969.

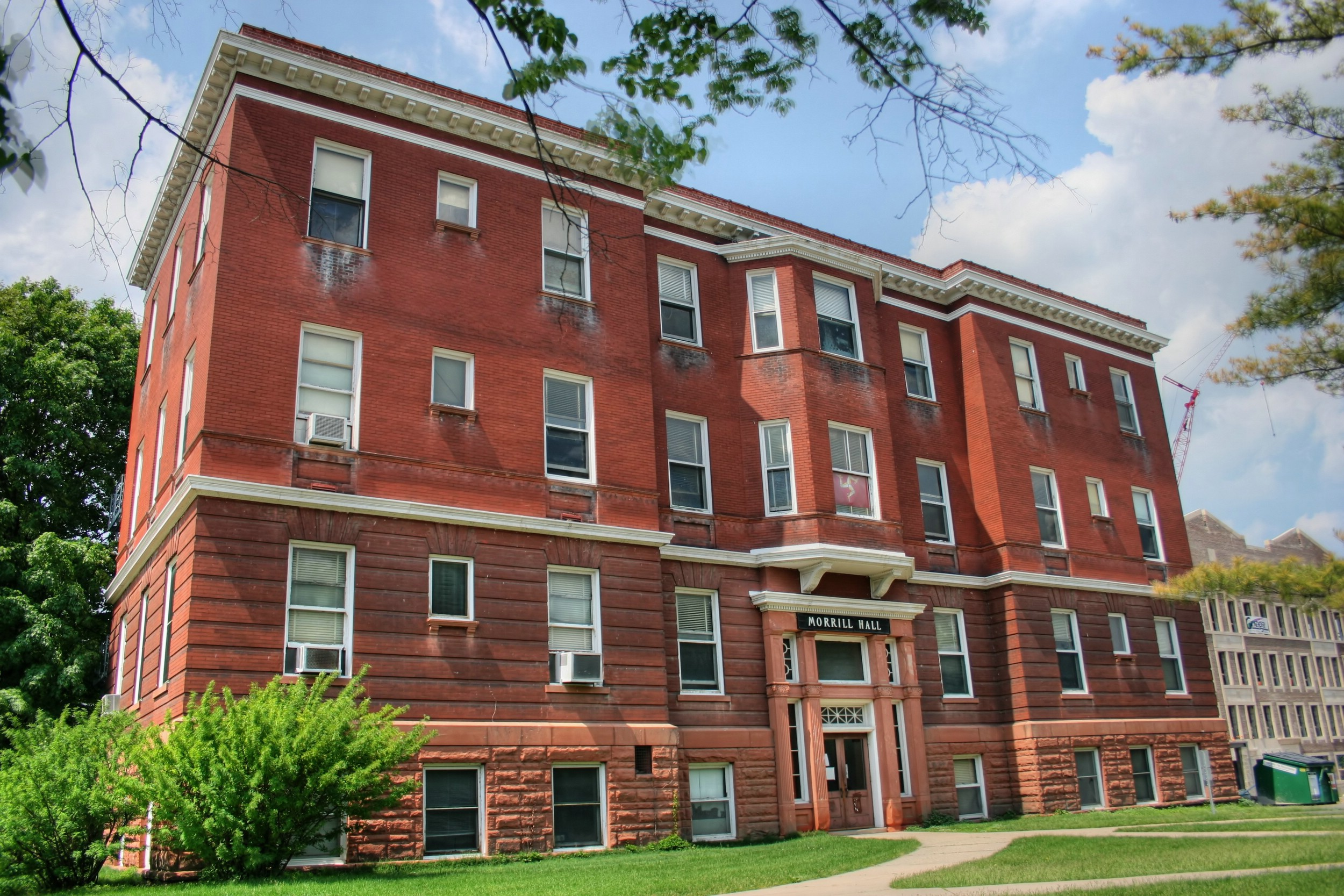
Morrill Hall is the oldest structure and an icon at Michigan State University, where Holmes received his M.D.

He enlisted in the US Army and served two years. Afterward, he completed a pre-med master's in microbiology and nutrition in 1973. He went North to medical school at Michigan State University, completing his M.D. in 1977. After that, he took several internships in Alabama and set up his residency in Ohio.

== Career ==
Holmes specialized in emergency medicine, settling in Birmingham, Alabama. There he served as an emergency department doctor for 23 years in hospitals. During this period, he also maintained loyalty and close interest in his alma mater of MSU.

== Later years ==
Holmes was recruited to Mississippi State in 2003 by Dr. Robert Collins to serve on the John C. Longest Student Health Center as a staff physician.

The gray-haired and always soft-spoken Holmes quickly became a favorite and valued member of the Mississippi State community. The university president, Charles Lee, noted that

The university gained from the courage and dignity [Dr. Holmes] demonstrated in 1965. Today's students are benefiting and learning from the professionalism and compassion that are evident in his practice as a campus physician. ... He has been, and remains, an inspiration, a role model and a mentor.

== Personal life and death ==
Holmes and wife Judie Granderson, a former school teacher from nearby Columbus, Mississippi, had a daughter, Rikeda, and son, Richard Holmes Jr.

Richard E. Holmes died in Louisville, Mississippi, on October 16, 2026, at the age of 82.

== Legacy and honors ==
- In 1991, Mississippi State recognized Holmes by naming the university's cultural diversity center in his honor.
- He and his wife Judie endowed a scholarship fund in his name to be awarded to minority students.
- In 2003, Holmes was invited to give the spring commencement speech at Mississippi State University.
- In 2004, Holmes donated his personal and professional papers to the MSU Mitchell Memorial Library.
- As of 2005 he was a member of the Wiley College Board of Trustees.
- 2006, He was named Mississippi State's 2006 National Alumnus of the Year.
- In 2007 the Mississippi State Legislature officially recognized and commended Holmes for his career and activities at Mississippi State.
