= Jue =

Jue or JUE may refer to:

- Jue (vessel), an ancient 3-legged Chinese wine pitcher
- Jue, a minor character in The Animatrix
- Japan University of Economics

== People with the surname ==
- Bhawoh Jue, NFL Free Safety
- Dong Jue, court official and general of the Shu Han during the Three Kingdoms period
- Jason P Jue, academic
- Martin F. Jue, American inventor and businessman

== See also ==
- Chueh (disambiguation)
