= Gwendolyn Elaine Armstrong =

American civil rights pioneer

Gwendolyn E. Armstrong
- Education: Rowan High School; University of Southern Mississippi
- Occupations: Civil rights activist, jazz singer
- Known for: Integrating the University of Southern Mississippi at Hattiesburg

Gwendolyn Elaine Armstrong was a black Mississippi pioneer in the Civil Rights Movement. In September, 1965, she and Raylawni Branch, both local natives, integrated the University of Southern Mississippi at Hattiesburg. They thus completed the process of breaking the segregation barriers at Mississippi's universities which had been begun by Clyde Kennard at (then) Mississippi Southern College (1956–61) and carried forward by James Meredith at the University of Mississippi (September, 1962) and Richard Holmes at Mississippi State University (July, 1965).

== Biography ==
Armstrong was a 1965 graduate of Hattiesburg's Royal Street (then Rowan) High School. She wished to attend college but had to stay at home to care for her invalid mother. The NAACP offered to support her entry into the local segregated white university, and recruited local civil rights activist Raylawni Branch to enter with her as moral support.

Having grown up in the black community of Hattiesburg, she was aware that the last black person to attempt to enroll at the university, Clyde Kennard, had been falsely sent to prison.

By this time (September, 1965) both Ole Miss and Mississippi State University had been integrated – the former violently, the latter peacefully. The Mississippi State Sovereignty Commission and University of Southern Mississippi leaders, such as President Dr. William David McCain, had earlier fought vociferously and successfully to thwart Clyde Kennard's attempts to enroll at (then) Mississippi Southern College. They had now come to realize that the battle to maintain segregation was lost. Therefore, McCain and his staff made extensive confidential plans for the admission and attendance of Armstrong and Branch. A faculty guardian and mentor was secretly appointed for each. The same campus police department which in 1959 had attempted to railroad Kennard to prison when he attempted to enroll, now had very strict orders to prevent or quickly stop any incident involving the two black students. Student athletic, social, and political leaders were recruited to keep the calm and protect the university from such bad publicity as Ole Miss had suffered from its reaction to James Meredith.

As a result, Armstrong had only very minor negative experiences. She studied music and singing, and helped the university choir win a championship. According to Branch, they were "treated just like everybody else.". In 1968 Armstrong (as Elaine Armstrong) pursued a brief career as a jazz styled singer recording in Nashville for a release on King Records.

The two women were accompanied by six bodyguards when on campus. The university administration appointed Dr. Geoffrey Fish, an oceanographer who taught biology as her guardian and tutor. Fish took a genuine interest in both women, gave them advice and jobs in work-study. He was very kind, listened to them, and was like a father figure to them.
