= Ben McGee =

American football player and coach (born 1939)

No. 60
- Positions: Defensive end, Defensive tackle

Personal information
- Born: January 26, 1939 (age 87); Starkville, Mississippi, U.S.
- Listed height: 6 ft 3 in (1.91 m)
- Listed weight: 250 lb (113 kg)

Career information
- High school: Henderson (Starkville)
- College: Jackson State
- NFL draft: 1964: 4th round, 51st overall pick
- AFL draft: 1964: 5th round, 35th overall pick

Career history

Playing
- Pittsburgh Steelers (1964–1972)

Coaching
- Jackson State (1973–1975) Defensive line coach; Arkansas–Pine Bluff (1976–1977) Defensive coordinator; Mississippi Valley State (1978–1979) Defensive coordinator; Arkansas–Pine Bluff (1980–1983) Head coach

Awards and highlights
- 2× Pro Bowl (1966, 1968); Pittsburgh Steelers Legends team

Career NFL statistics
- Fumble recoveries: 7
- Interceptions: 1
- Sacks: 34.5
- Stats at Pro Football Reference

Head coaching record
- Career: 17–22–4 (.442)

Benjamin McGee Jr. (born January 26, 1939) is an American former professional football player and college coach. He played as a defensive end for nine seasons in the National Football League (NFL) with the Pittsburgh Steelers. He played college football at Jackson State University. McGee served as head football coach at the University of Arkansas at Pine Bluff for four seasons, from 1980 to 1983, compiling a record of 17–22–4.

== Early life ==
McGee was born on January 26, 1939, in Starkville, Mississippi. He attended Henderson High School in Starkville. Henderson was segregated during the years he attended.

== College football ==
McGee attended Jackson State College (now Jackson State University). Nearly 100 Jackson State players have gone on to play professional football, including his Jackson State teammates Willie Richardson, Verlon Biggs, and future Pittsburgh Steeler teammate Frank Molden. He was named to the Pittsburgh Courier's Black College All-America teams at tackle in 1962 and 1963. Time picked McGee as an All-American in 1962, his junior year, describing him as already having the instincts of a professional player.

== Professional football ==
The Steelers selected McGee in the fourth round of the 1964 NFL draft, 51st overall. The New York Jets selected him in the fifth round of the 1964 AFL draft, 35th overall. He played nine years for the Steelers (1964–72), the first seven at defensive end and the last two at defensive tackle. He started every game in his rookie season and every game in his final season, and was a regular starter every season except 1967 and 1971. He was 6 ft 3 in (1.9 m), and played at 250 lb (113 kg) or 260 lb (118 kg), and was considered enormously strong.

In 1965, coach Buddy Parker told team vice president and general manager Dan Rooney (son of owner Art Rooney) that he wanted to trade McGee or lineman Chuck Hinton for King Hill. Rooney responded "'Why weaken the defensive line for a second-string quarterback?'", while leaving the final decision to Parker. Parker did not make the trade. (Ten years earlier, Rooney had unsuccessfully (and now famously) pleaded with his father and coach Walt Kiesling not to cut Johnny Unitas, whom the younger Rooney had drafted.)

In his rookie season, McGee had a career high 8.5 quarterback sacks. In 1966, he had 6.5 sacks and made the Pro Bowl for the first time, as a defensive end. The Sporting News also named him first-team All-Conference. He made the Pro Bowl for his second and last time in 1968, again at defensive end. He finished his career with 34.5 sacks, nine fumble recoveries and an interception.

In 1971, McGee was moved to defensive tackle to make room for skilled pass rusher L. C. Greenwood at defensive end. McGee only started four games, with Lloyd Voss starting the majority of games at right tackle next to future Hall of Famer Joe Greene at left tackle.

In his final year, McGee started every game at right tackle on a defensive line that included Dwight White (right defensive end), Joe Greene (left tackle), and L. C. Greenwood (left defensive end). That 1972 Steelers defense allowed the second fewest points in the NFL (175) and the eighth fewest total yards. McGee had two sacks that year. The team finished with an 11–3 record, and went to the American Football Conference Championship Game where they lost to the undefeated Miami Dolphins, 21–17. In 1973, Ernie Holmes took over for McGee at right tackle, and that foursome would be known as the "Steel Curtain".

== Coaching career ==
McGee retired from playing in 1972, and began his coaching career in 1973 as an assistant coach at his alma mater, Jackson State, under head coach Robert Hill. He coached the defensive line as Jackson State before leaving in 1976 to become the defensive coordinator at University of Arkansas at Pine Bluff. After two years at Arkansas—Pine Bluff, McGee took on the same role as defensive coordinator at Mississippi Valley State. In 1980, he returned to Arkansas—Pine Bluff as head football coach, succeeding James Shaw. The team was 2–8 the year before prior, in 1979. McGee served as head coach for the Arkansas–Pine Bluff Golden Lions four seasons, from 1980 to 1983, compiling a record of 17–22–4.

== Personal life ==
McGee's son, Ben McGee Jr., also played football at Jackson State as a defensive lineman.

== Head coaching record ==
Year	Team	Overall	Conference	Standing	Bowl/playoffs
Arkansas–Pine Bluff Golden Lions (NCAA Division II independent) (1980–1982)
1980	Arkansas–Pine Bluff	5–6			
1981	Arkansas–Pine Bluff	5–4–2			
1982	Arkansas–Pine Bluff	5–5–1			
Arkansas–Pine Bluff Golden Lions (NAIA Division I independent) (1983)
1983	Arkansas–Pine Bluff	2–7–1			
Arkansas–Pine Bluff:		17–22–4			
Total:		17–22–4			
