= John Peoples =

John Peoples may refer to:

- John A. Peoples (born 1926), president of Jackson State University
- John Peoples Jr. (1933–2025), American physicist
