= Delta Ministry =

U.S. civil rights project

The Delta Ministry played a crucial role in the Civil Rights Movement in Mississippi. It was begun in September 1964, by the National Council of Churches as a civil rights project operating in Mississippi to support the southern black freedom struggle. Among the local civil rights groups including the SNCC, NAACP and CORE, the Delta Ministry became Mississippi's largest and provided numerous services and programs for area black people through the 1980s. It had "a significant impact on the black struggle for equality in Mississippi."

The DM sought to provide "relief, education and training, self-help initiatives, economic and community development, and the fostering of indigenous leadership and leadership skills" in the poorest areas of the state. It operated primarily in the Delta but also in McComb and Hattiesburg (where it supported Raylawni Branch). It successfully pressured state and federal agencies to distribute relief funds to the state's poorest communities, and itself distributed tons of food and clothing to local black people. It also supervised the establishment of federally funded health clinics in Mound Bayou and Greenville, and registered some 70,000 black people to vote.

The Ministry was always poorly funded for its ambitions plans. Also, there was often poor and unrealistic planning and unrealistic expectations of the poor and uneducated black people they were trying to help.

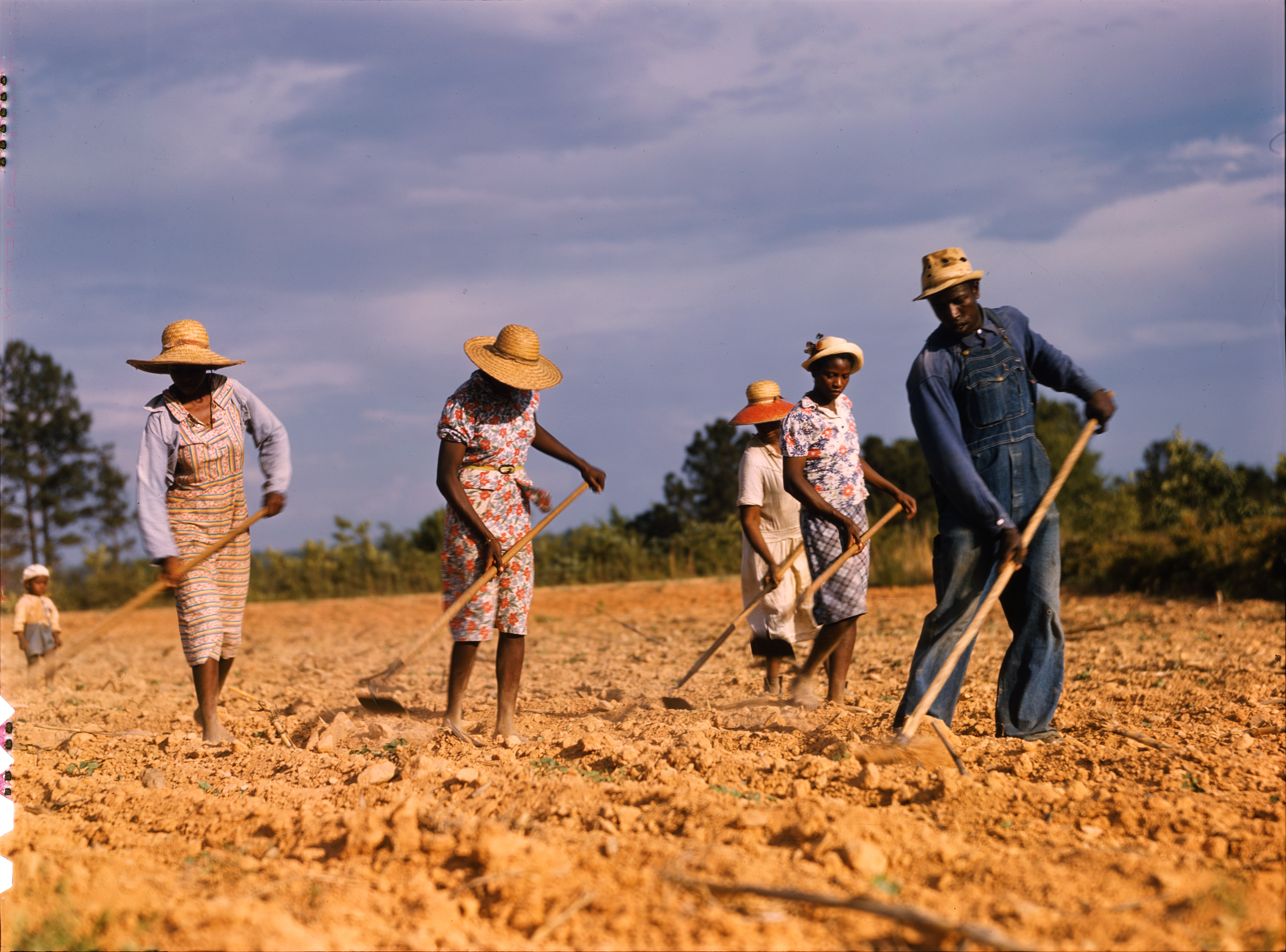
Most Delta area black people lived in deep poverty earning a sub-standard living at hand labor in agriculture.

These were causes of the failure of the ambitious Freedom City commune project of 94 residents on 400 acres (1.6 km^{2}) near Greenville in 1966 which was planned to be an alternative to the out-migration of displaced black field hands, and to teach economic self-sufficiency and political independence.

Another problem was tensions with the black middle class (who had less to gain and more to lose) and their churches. These offered little support to Ministry activities, and often criticized their efforts as too radical. There were also tensions with activists from the middle classes affiliated with the NAACP with its conservative, gradualist approach to social change.

From the late 1960s onward it was internal problems, rather than white resistance, that impaired the Delta Ministry's efforts. Under Owen Brooks, a black northerner who the NCC appointed DM director in 1967, the group split over philosophical and personality issues into two separate units. Brooks wanted broad, statewide goals while the concerned staff wanted to promote projects and leaders on the local level. After 1977, the DM existed as a one-man organization under Brooks.
