= Starkville, Mississippi =

City in Mississippi, United States

- City
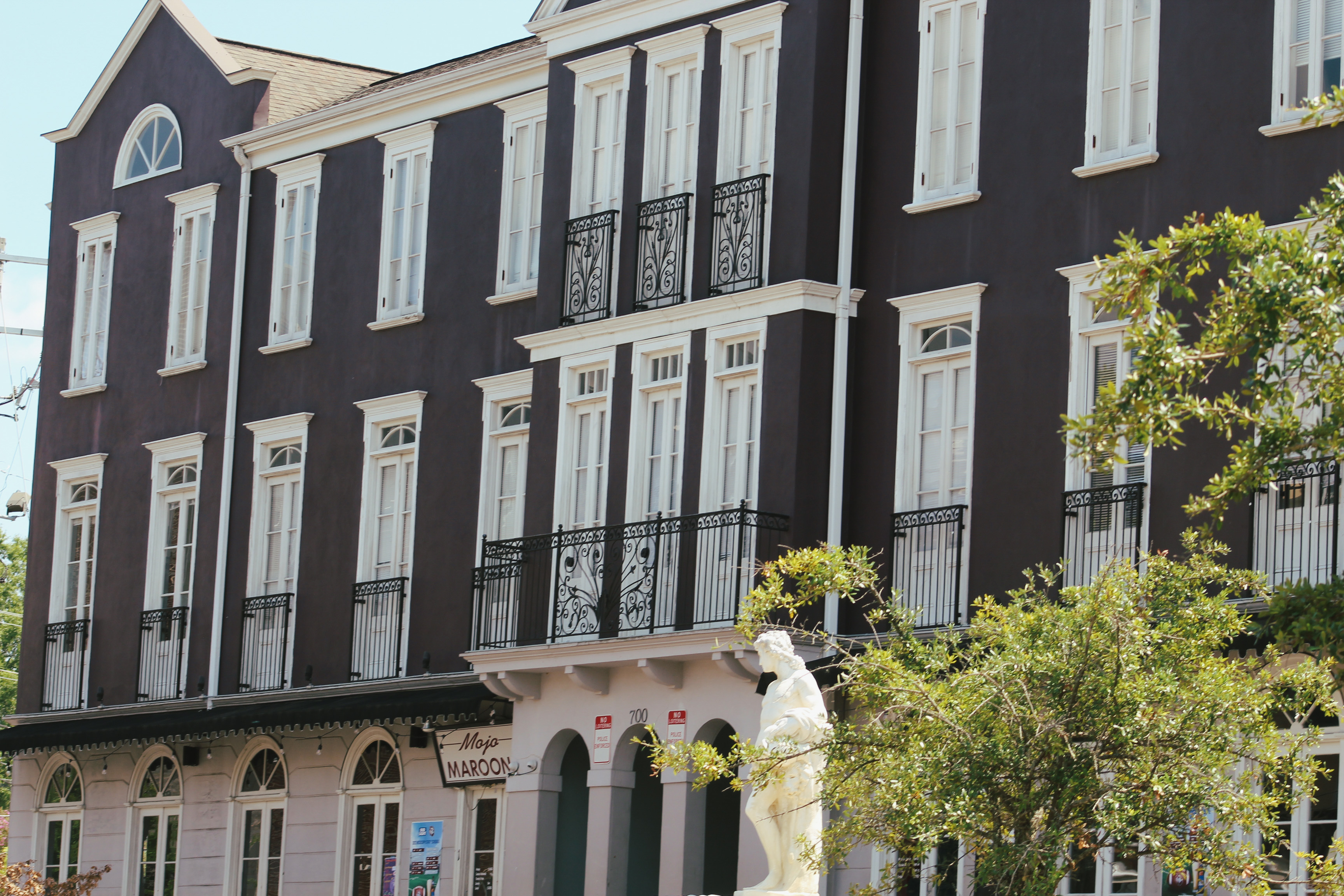
- Cotton District

- Flag Seal Logo
- Nicknames: StarkVegas, Boardtown
- Location of Starkville, Mississippi

- Location in the United States
- Coordinates: 33°27′45″N 88°49′12″W
- Country: United States
- State: Mississippi
- County: Oktibbeha
- City: 1835
- Named for: John Stark

Government
  - Type: Mayor-Council government
  - Mayor: Lynn Spruill (D)

Area
  - Total: 25.63 sq mi (66.37 km^{2})
  - Land: 25.51 sq mi (66.08 km^{2})
  - Water: 0.11 sq mi (0.28 km^{2})
- Elevation: 335 ft (102 m)

Population (2020)
  - Total: 24,360
  - Density: 954.7/sq mi (368.63/km^{2})
- Time zone: UTC−6 (Central (CST))
  - Summer (DST): UTC−5 (CDT)
- ZIP codes: 39759-39760
- Area code: 662
- FIPS code: 28-70240
- GNIS feature ID: 0678227
- Website: cityofstarkville.org

Starkville is a city in and the county seat of Oktibbeha County, Mississippi, United States. As of the 2020 United States census, Starkville's population is 24,360, making it the 16th-most populated city in Mississippi. Starkville is the largest city in the Golden Triangle, which had a population of 175,474 in 2020, and the principal city of the Starkville–Columbus, MS CSA. Founded in 1831, the city was originally known as Boardtown for the local sawmilling operation there, but was renamed in 1837 to honor American Revolutionary War general John Stark.

Starkville is adjacent to and closely associated with Mississippi State University, which was founded as the state's flagship land-grant research university in 1878. The university was located near Starkville in the Mississippi Black Belt due to the region's agricultural productivity, particularly in the timber, cattle, and dairying industries. The expansion of the university transformed Starkville from a primarily agricultural center into a college town, and its economy today is mostly centered around advanced research and manufacturing, retail, and tourism supported by the university population. The Cotton District, developed in the 1960s as North America's first New Urbanist community, is an active student quarter located between downtown Starkville and the university campus.

== History ==
The Starkville area has been inhabited for over 2,100 years. Artifacts in the form of clay pot fragments and artwork dating from that time period have been found east of Starkville at the Herman Mound and Village site, which is listed on the National Register of Historic Places. The village site can be accessed from the Indian Mound Campground. The earthwork mounds were made by early Native Americans of moundbuilder cultures as part of their religious and political cosmology.

Shortly before the American Revolutionary War period, the area was inhabited by the Choccuma (or Chakchiuma) tribe. They were annihilated about that time by a rare alliance between the Choctaw and Chickasaw peoples.

=== Early 19th century ===
The modern European-American settlement of the Starkville area was started after the Choctaw inhabitants of Oktibbeha County surrendered their claims to land in the area in the Treaty of Dancing Rabbit Creek in 1830. Most of the Native Americans of the Southeast were forced west of the Mississippi River during the 1830s and Indian Removal.

White settlers were drawn to the Starkville area because of two large springs near the old part of the town, which Native Americans had used for thousands of years. A mill on the Big Black River southwest of town produced clapboards, giving the town its original name, Boardtown in 1834. The first court met in 1834 under a large tree. In 1835, when Boardtown was established as the county seat of Oktibbeha County, it was renamed as Starkville in honor of Revolutionary War hero General John Stark. A log courthouse and a one-room jailhouse were constructed in 1835. The jailhouse was unusual in that it had no doors or windows. Prisoners were made to climb a ladder to the roof and then let down through a trap door using a rope.

The first newspaper was founded in 1847. Originally titled The Starkville Whig, it was later renamed The Broad Ax.

=== Reconstruction to the 20th century ===
In 1865, during reconstruction, the officer in charge of Starkville allowed a black man accused of raping a white girl to be lynched by running him down with hounds.

In 1875 a fire destroyed 52 buildings. The entire business district was destroyed.

A carpetbagger named McLaughlin, who served as the local head of the Freedmen's Bureau, assisted in the establishment of a black Methodist church and established a cooperative store for blacks in his home. This enraged the white citizens so the Klan attacked the store.

On May 5, 1879, two black men who had been accused of burning a barn, Nevlin Porter and Johnson Spencer, were taken from the jail by a mob of men and hanged from crossties of the Mobile and Ohio Railroad.

In 1888, a mob hanged an African-American man, Eli Bryant, for an alleged attack on a white woman.

Several newspapers were founded in this time period, including The Starkville News in 1891. Early banks included The Peoples Bank in 1889 and Security State Bank in 1896.

A yellow fever epidemic in 1898 resulted in a quarantine of Starkville's railroads by the towns of West Point, Columbus, Artesia and Kosciusko. This resulted in a depletion of medical and other supplies which ultimately resulted in intervention by the state.

=== 20th century ===
Before the Civil War, Colonel Montgomery imported cattle from the isle of Jersey, initiating the areas prominence as a dairy center. In 1912, the co-operative creamery was created, and in 1926 the Borden Condensary was established.

In April 1912, Gabe (sometimes reported as Abe) Coleman, an African-American man was accused of attacking a farmer's wife and was shot to death by a mob. Nine men were tried for the murder. In February 1912, another African-American man, Mann Hamilton, was murdered by a mob for allegedly attacking a woman. Following an incident in which whites fired into a Republican Meeting at a church in Chapel Hill, Mississippi, killing a black man, a group of black men planned a march in Starkville. They were met at a bridge near the A & M dairy barn by white men from Starkville and West Point armed with cannon loaded with buckshot and iron.

In 1915, two African-American men, Dit Seals and Peter Bolen, were hanged in a public execution while a crowd of 5,000, including blacks and whites, and children watched and sang There is a Land of Pure Delight. The crowd ate lunch while the execution was being conducted. Vendors were on hand selling popcorn, soda pop and sandwiches. The men had been convicted of killing Willie Taylor, an African-American porter on the Mobile and Ohio Railroad. The story was widely reported as a "gala hanging" sponsored by the merchants of Starkville by various newspapers including the New York World and Chicago Tribune, while the Detroit Times described it as little better than a lynching.

In 1922, Starkville was the site of a large rally of the Ku Klux Klan.

In 1926 the Borden Condensery was established, the first condensery in the southern U.S. At the time, Starkville was served by two railroads, the Illinois Central and the Mobile and Ohio.

In 1970, several Black organizations organized a boycott or selective buying campaign. This was met with firebombings, and a crowd of African-Americans assembled near Henderson High School was broken up by gunfire.

=== 21st century ===
On March 21, 2006, Starkville became the first city in Mississippi to adopt a smoking ban for indoor public places, including restaurants and bars. This ordinance went into effect on May 20, 2006.

In February 2018, Starkville denied a local LGBTQ organization a permit to host a pride parade. The organizers initiated legal action, after which the city reversed its decision. The parade was held in March 2018 with almost 3,000 attendees.

== Geography ==
According to the United States Census Bureau, the city has a total area of 25.8 square miles (66.9 km^{2}), of which 25.7 square miles (66.5 km^{2}) is land and 0.2 square miles (0.4 km^{2}) (0.58%) is water.

U.S. Route 82 and Mississippi Highways 12 and 25 are major roads through Starkville. US 82 runs east to west across the northern portion of the city as a bypass, leading east 25 mi (40 km) to Columbus and northwest 28 mi (45 km) to Eupora. Route 25 leads south 31 mi (50 km) to Louisville and Route 12 leads southwest 26 mi (42 km) to Ackerman. The nearest airport with scheduled service is Golden Triangle Regional Airport (GTR). George M. Bryan Field (KSTF) serves as Starkville's general aviation airport. There are multiple privately owned airstrips in the area.

=== Climate ===
Starkville has a humid subtropical climate (Köppen Cfa) with long, hot summers and short, mild winters.

Climate data for Starkville, Mississippi (Mississippi State University) 1991–2020 normals, extremes 1891–present
Month	Jan	Feb	Mar	Apr	May	Jun	Jul	Aug	Sep	Oct	Nov	Dec	Year
Record high °F (°C)	81 (27)	88 (31)	94 (34)	93 (34)	100 (38)	105 (41)	111 (44)	108 (42)	109 (43)	99 (37)	90 (32)	82 (28)	111 (44)
Mean maximum °F (°C)	73.0 (22.8)	76.4 (24.7)	82.8 (28.2)	86.8 (30.4)	91.9 (33.3)	95.8 (35.4)	98.4 (36.9)	98.8 (37.1)	95.9 (35.5)	89.1 (31.7)	80.9 (27.2)	74.7 (23.7)	100.5 (38.1)
Mean daily maximum °F (°C)	54.1 (12.3)	58.6 (14.8)	66.8 (19.3)	75.0 (23.9)	82.5 (28.1)	88.8 (31.6)	91.7 (33.2)	91.7 (33.2)	86.8 (30.4)	77.0 (25.0)	65.4 (18.6)	56.9 (13.8)	74.6 (23.7)
Daily mean °F (°C)	43.7 (6.5)	47.4 (8.6)	55.1 (12.8)	63.2 (17.3)	71.8 (22.1)	78.9 (26.1)	82.0 (27.8)	81.2 (27.3)	75.6 (24.2)	64.3 (17.9)	53.4 (11.9)	46.4 (8.0)	63.6 (17.6)
Mean daily minimum °F (°C)	33.2 (0.7)	36.2 (2.3)	43.3 (6.3)	51.3 (10.7)	61.0 (16.1)	69.0 (20.6)	72.2 (22.3)	70.7 (21.5)	64.3 (17.9)	51.7 (10.9)	41.5 (5.3)	35.9 (2.2)	52.5 (11.4)
Mean minimum °F (°C)	15.9 (−8.9)	20.5 (−6.4)	25.8 (−3.4)	34.1 (1.2)	44.6 (7.0)	57.7 (14.3)	64.2 (17.9)	61.5 (16.4)	49.2 (9.6)	34.5 (1.4)	25.3 (−3.7)	21.1 (−6.1)	14.3 (−9.8)
Record low °F (°C)	−6 (−21)	−12 (−24)	11 (−12)	20 (−7)	31 (−1)	41 (5)	52 (11)	52 (11)	37 (3)	26 (−3)	10 (−12)	−8 (−22)	−12 (−24)
Average precipitation inches (mm)	5.48 (139)	6.18 (157)	5.37 (136)	6.07 (154)	4.23 (107)	4.59 (117)	4.51 (115)	4.21 (107)	3.74 (95)	3.86 (98)	4.42 (112)	5.32 (135)	57.98 (1,473)
Average snowfall inches (cm)	0.3 (0.76)	0.2 (0.51)	0.0 (0.0)	0.0 (0.0)	0.0 (0.0)	0.0 (0.0)	0.0 (0.0)	0.0 (0.0)	0.0 (0.0)	0.0 (0.0)	0.0 (0.0)	0.0 (0.0)	0.5 (1.3)
Average precipitation days (≥ 0.01 in)	11.4	10.6	10.4	9.0	9.7	10.7	9.8	9.7	6.5	7.1	8.9	10.3	114.1
Average snowy days (≥ 0.1 in)	0.2	0.1	0.0	0.0	0.0	0.0	0.0	0.0	0.0	0.0	0.0	0.0	0.3
Source: NOAA

== Demographics ==
Historical population
Census	Pop.	Note	%±
1870	475		—
1880	1,500		215.8%
1890	1,725		15.0%
1900	1,986		15.1%
1910	2,698		35.9%
1920	2,596		−3.8%
1930	3,612		39.1%
1940	4,900		35.7%
1950	7,107		45.0%
1960	9,041		27.2%
1970	11,369		25.7%
1980	16,139		42.0%
1990	18,458		14.4%
2000	21,869		18.5%
2010	23,888		9.2%
2020	24,360		2.0%
U.S. Decennial Census

Downtown Starkville

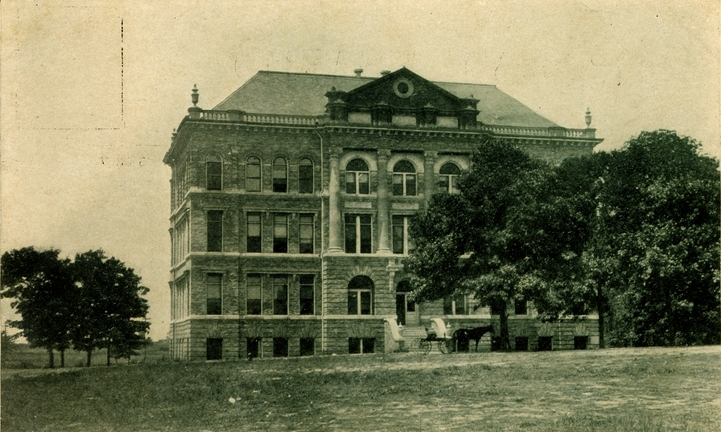
Montgomery Hall is one of 22 sites in Starkville listed on the National Register of Historic Places.

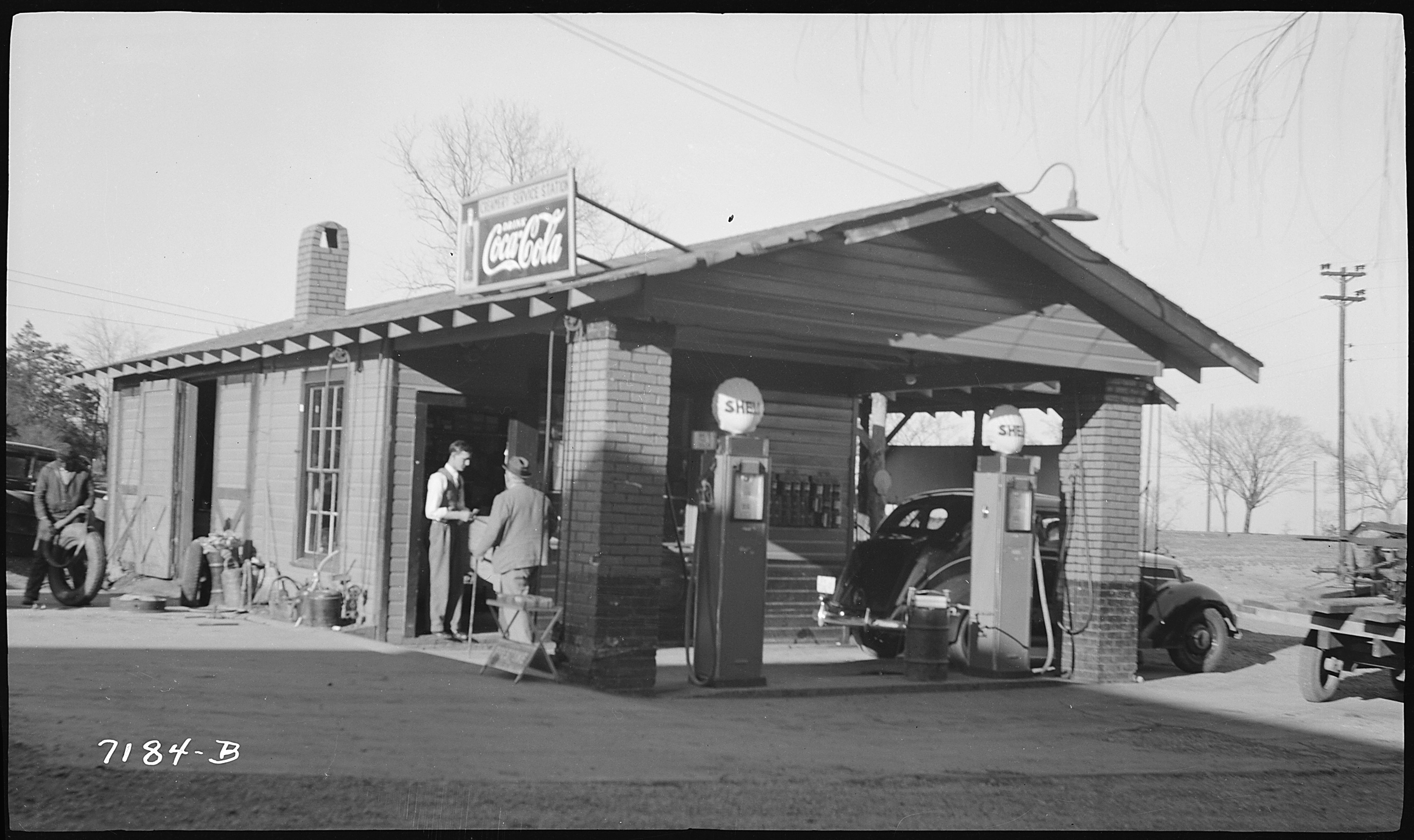
Cooperative Creamery Station in Starkville, 1939

=== 2020 census ===
As of the 2020 census, Starkville had a population of 24,360 and 4,895 families. The median age was 28.7 years. 18.3% of residents were under the age of 18 and 12.9% of residents were 65 years of age or older. For every 100 females there were 92.2 males, and for every 100 females age 18 and over there were 90.1 males age 18 and over.

95.8% of residents lived in urban areas, while 4.2% lived in rural areas.

There were 11,278 households in Starkville, of which 22.7% had children under the age of 18 living in them. Of all households, 28.2% were married-couple households, 27.0% were households with a male householder and no spouse or partner present, and 39.7% were households with a female householder and no spouse or partner present. About 40.8% of all households were made up of individuals and 8.4% had someone living alone who was 65 years of age or older.

There were 13,670 housing units, of which 17.5% were vacant. The homeowner vacancy rate was 2.7% and the rental vacancy rate was 15.9%.

Racial composition as of the 2020 census
Race	Number	Percent
White	13,691	56.2%
Black or African American	8,445	34.7%
American Indian and Alaska Native	41	0.2%
Asian	1,047	4.3%
Native Hawaiian and Other Pacific Islander	7	0.0%
Some other race	258	1.1%
Two or more races	871	3.6%
Hispanic or Latino (of any race)	671	2.8%

=== 2010 census ===
As of the 2010 United States census, there were 23,888 people, 9,845 households, and 4,800 families residing in the city. The population density was 936.4 inhabitants per square mile (361.5/km^{2}). There were 11,767 housing units at an average density of 396.7 per square mile (153.2/km^{2}). The racial makeup of the city was 58.5% white, 34.06% African American, 0.2% Native American, 3.75% Asian, 0.1% Pacific Islander, 0.64% from other races, and 1.3% from two or more races. Hispanics or Latinos of any race were 1.8% of the population.

There were 9,845 households, out of which 24.1% had children under the age of 18 living with them, 34.1% were married couples living together, 13.0% had a female householder with no husband present, and 50.1% were non-families. 32.1% of all households were made up of individuals, and 6.3% had someone living alone who was 65 years of age or older. The average household size was 2.35 and the average family size was 2.92.

The age distribution, strongly influenced by the presence of Mississippi State, was 18.8% under 18, 29.7% from 18 to 24, 26.6% from 25 to 44, 15.2% from 45 to 64, and 9.4% who were 65 years of age or older. The median age was 25 years. For every 100 females, there were 102.0 males. For every 100 females age 18 and over, there were 101.5 males.

The median income for a household in the city was $31,357, and the median income for a family was $40,557. Males had a median income of $35,782 versus $23,711 for females. The per capita income for the city was $22,787. About 19.1% of families and 33.6% of the population were below the poverty line, including 29.3% of those under age 18 and 17.8% of those age 65 or over.

=== Religion ===
Starkville has more than 80 places of worship, which serve most religious traditions. Faculty, staff and students at Mississippi State University, including those from other nations, have greatly increased the city's diversity. As of October 2007, approximately half (49.74%) of the residents of Starkville claim a religious affiliation; most are Christian. Of those claiming affiliation, 41.59% self-identify as Protestant, including 25% Baptist and 11% Methodist. Lower percentages identify as Catholic, Mormon, Hindu and Muslim.

== Arts and culture ==
=== Cotton District ===
The Cotton District is a neighborhood located in Starkville that was redeveloped as part of the new urbanism movement. It was founded in 1969 by Dan Camp, who was the developer, owner and property manager of much of the area. The architecture of the Cotton District has historical elements and scale, with Greek Revival mixed with Classical or Victorian. It is a compact, walkable neighborhood that contains many restaurants and bars, in addition to thousands of unique residential units.

=== Libraries ===
The Starkville-Oktibbeha County Public Library System is headquartered at its main branch in Downtown Starkville. In addition to the local public library, the Mississippi State University Library has the largest collection in Mississippi. The Mississippi State Mitchell Memorial Library also hosts the Ulysses S. Grant Presidential Library and the Frank and Virginia Williams Collection of Lincolniana.

=== Annual events ===
Starkville is home to the Starkville Derby, which is recognized as the world's largest charity wiener dog race. Held annually in the Cotton District, the event raises funds for local charities and features a variety of community-focused activities.

== Government ==
Executive and legislative authority in the city of Starkville is respectively vested in a mayor and seven-member board of aldermen concurrently elected to four-year terms. Since 2017 the mayor has been Lynn Spruill, a Democrat and the first female mayor elected in Starkville's history. Starkville has a strong-mayor government, with the mayor having the power to appoint city officials and veto decisions by the board of aldermen.

Starkville is split between Mississippi House districts 38 and 43, currently represented by Democrat Cheikh Taylor and Republican Rob Roberson. The city is similarly split between Mississippi Senate districts 15 and 16 represented by Republican Bart Williams and Democrat Angela Turner-Ford. Starkville and Oktibbeha County are in the northern districts of the Mississippi Transportation Commission and Public Service Commission, represented by Republican John Caldwell and Democrat Brandon Presley.

Starkville is in Mississippi's 3rd Congressional District, represented by Congressman Michael Guest.

== Education ==
=== Public schools ===
In 1927, the city and the Rosenwald Foundation opened a pair of schools, the Rosenwald School and the Oktibbeha County Training School, later known as Henderson High School, for its African-American residents. In 1970, integration caused the merger of these schools with the white schools. Henderson was repurposed as a junior high school, and the Rosenwald School was burned to the ground.

Until 2015, Starkville and much of the surrounding area was served by the Starkville School District (SSD) while Oktibbeha County was served by Oktibbeha County School District (OCSD). The two districts were realigned following integration in 1970 in a way that placed Starkville and majority-white, relatively affluent areas immediately outside of the city limits into SSD while the remaining portions of Oktibbeha County, which are over 90% Black, were placed into OCSD. As a result of this disparity in the racial demographics of the two districts, Oktibbeha County was placed under a Federal desegregation order. Previous attempts to consolidate the two districts during the 1990s and in 2010 had been unsuccessful, but following an act of the Mississippi Legislature the two were consolidated in 2015. Contrary to predictions, the public schools experienced an inflow of students from private schools when the predominantly white Starkville School district merged with the predominantly black Oktibbeha schools.

The schools continue to operate under a Federal desegregation order.

The following schools of the Starkville Oktibbeha Consolidated School District are located in Starkville:

- Sudduth Elementary (grades K–1)
- Henderson Ward Stewart Elementary (grades 2–4)
- Overstreet Elementary (grade 5)
- Partnership Middle School (grades 6–7)
- Armstrong Junior High School (grades 8–9)
- Starkville High School (grades 10–12)
- Emerson Preschool
- Millsaps Career & Technology Center

In 2015 it was announced that SOCSD and Mississippi State University would cooperate in establishing a partnership school. The school will be for all grade 6 and 7 students in Oktibbeha County and will be located on the Mississippi State University campus. The school will serve as an instructional site for students and faculty of Mississippi State University's College of Education, and as a one-of-a-kind rural education research center. Construction on the partnership school began in spring 2017. The school opened in August 2020.

Prior to integration, African-American students in Starkville attended the historic Henderson High School. The school was later re-purposed as Starkville School District's junior high school and is now an elementary school.

=== Private schools ===
Private schools in Starkville include:

- Starkville Academy, founded 1969
- Starkville Christian School, founded 1996

Starkville Academy has been described as a segregation academy. Despite fears that the consolidation of the Starkville and Oktibbeha County school districts in 2015 would lead to additional White flight to private schools, district consolidation actually resulted in decreased enrollment at area private schools as more white parents living in Oktibbeha County opted to enroll their children in the consolidated district.

=== Tertiary education and libraries ===
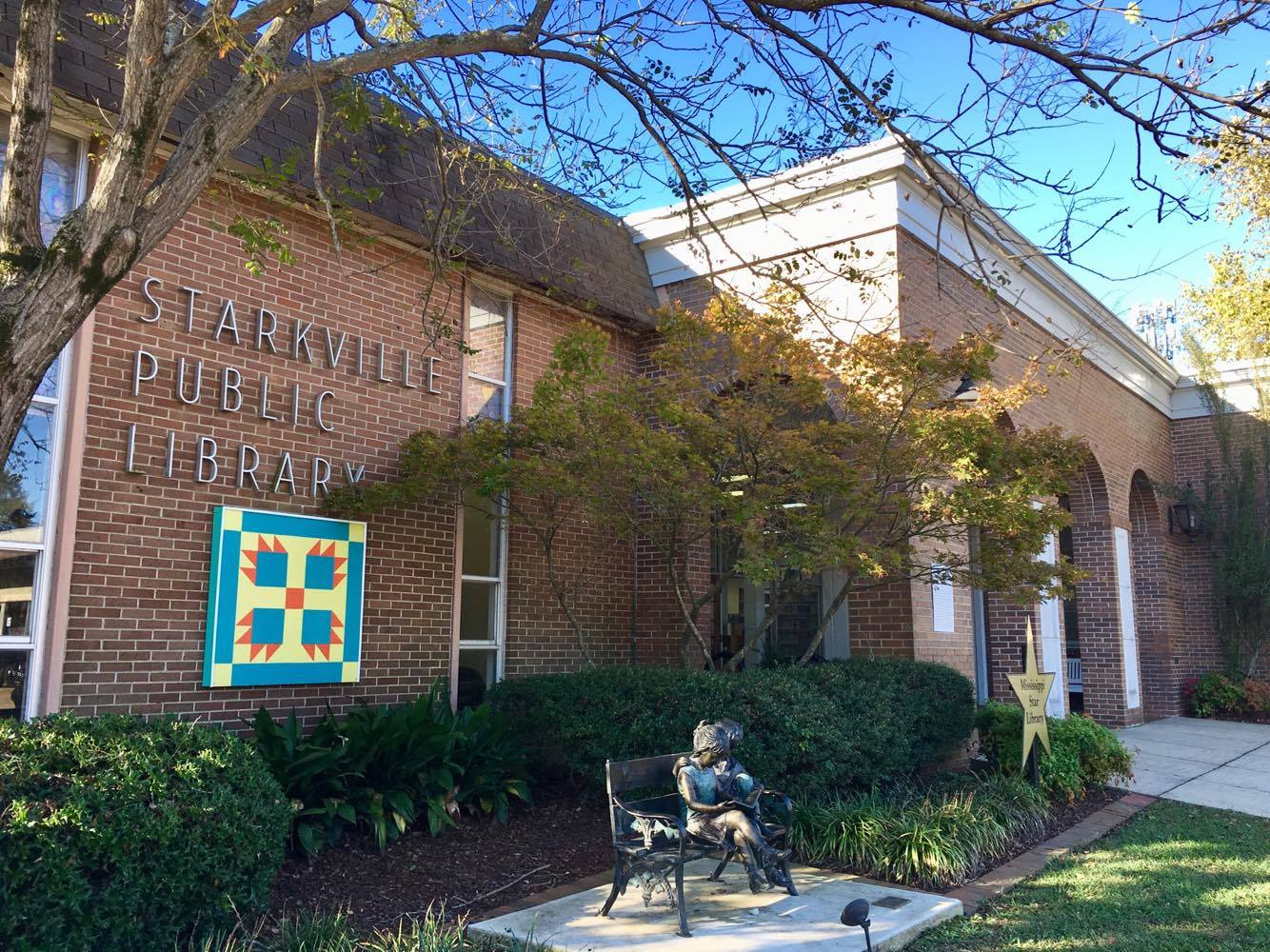
Starkville Library

Mississippi State University is partially in the Starkville city limits, and partially in the Mississippi State census-designated place.

East Mississippi Community College is the designated community college for the county, but does not operate facilities in it.

Starkville-Oktibbeha County Public Library System maintains the Starkville Library.

== Media ==
=== Newspapers ===
- The Starkville Daily News
- The Reflector (MSU Student Newspaper)
- The Starkville Dispatch (a localized edition of The Commercial Dispatch)

=== Radio ===
- WMSV (Mississippi State Radio Station)
- WMAB (Public Radio)
- WMSU
- WQJB
- WMXU
- WJZB
- WSMS
- WSSO (WSSO was Starkville's first radio station, first broadcasting in 1949 at 250W on 1230 AM)

=== Television ===
- WCBI
- WTVA
- WLOV-TV

=== Magazines ===
- Town and Gown Magazine

== Notable people ==
- Luqman Ali, musician
- Dee Barton, composer
- Cool Papa Bell, African-American baseball player; member of Baseball Hall of Fame
- Fred Bell, baseball player in the Negro leagues; brother of Cool Papa Bell
- Josh Booty, professional baseball and football player
- Julio Borbon, professional baseball player
- Marquez Branson, professional football player
- A. J. Brown, NFL wide receiver
- Harry Burgess, governor of the Panama Canal Zone, 1928–1932
- Cyril Edward Cain, preacher, professor, historian; lived in Starkville
- John Wilson Carpenter III, distinguished U.S. Air Force pilot and commander
- Jemmye Carroll, appeared on MTV's The Real World and The Challenge
- Joe Carter, professional football player
- Hughie Critz, professional baseball player
- Sylvester Croom, first black football coach in the Southeastern Conference
- Mohammad "Mo" Dakhlalla, convicted of offenses related to his attempts to join ISIS in Syria
- Willie Daniel, professional football player and businessman
- Kermit Davis, basketball player and coach
- Al Denson, musician and Christian radio and television show host
- Antuan Edwards, professional football player
- Drew Eubanks, basketball player
- Rockey Felker, football player and coach
- Willie Gay, NFL linebacker
- William L. Giles, former president of Mississippi State University; lived in Starkville
- Scott Tracy Griffin, author, actor, and pop culture historian
- Horace Harned, politician
- Helen Young Hayes, investment manager
- Kim Hill, Christian singer
- Shauntay Hinton, Miss District of Columbia USA 2002, Miss USA 2002
- Richard E. Holmes, medical doctor and one of the five young black Mississippians who pioneered the effort to desegregate the major universities of Mississippi; graduate of Henderson High School
- Bailey Howell, college and professional basketball player; lives in Starkville
- Gary Jackson, served in Mississippi Senate
- Paul Jackson, artist; spent childhood in Starkville
- Hayes Jones, gold medalist in 110-meter hurdles at Tokyo 1964 Olympics
- Martin F. Jue, amateur radio inventor, entrepreneur; founder of MFJ Enterprises
- Mark E. Keenum, president of Mississippi State University
- Harlan D. Logan, Rhodes Scholar, tennis coach, magazine editor, and politician
- Ray Mabus, former Mississippi governor
- Ben McGee, professional football player
- Jim McIngvale, businessman in Houston, Texas
- Shane McRae, actor
- William M. Miley, U.S. Army major general; professor of military science; lived in Starkville
- Freddie Milons, college and professional football player
- Leland Mitchell, professional basketball player
- Monroe Mitchell, professional baseball player
- William Bell Montgomery, agricultural publisher
- Jess Mowry, author of juvenile books
- Jasmine Murray, singer
- Travis Outlaw, professional basketball player
- Archie Pate, baseball player in the Negro leagues
- John Peoples, President of Jackson State University from 1967 to 1984
- Ron Polk, Olympic and college Baseball Coach.
- Del Rendon, musician; lived in Starkville
- Jerry Rice, professional football player; member of NFL Hall of Fame and College Football Hall of Fame
- Nannie Herndon Rice, suffragist and librarian, born and lived in Starkville
- Keith Riles, university physics professor
- Dero A. Saunders, journalist and author
- Bill Stacy, football player, mayor of Starkville
- Rick Stansbury, Basketball coach
- John Marshall Stone, longest-serving governor of Mississippi; second president of Mississippi State University; namesake of Stone County, Mississippi
- April Sykes, professional basketball player in the Women's National Basketball Association
- Amy Tuck, former Mississippi Lieutenant Governor; lives in Starkville
- Latavious Williams, professional basketball player
- Jaelyn Young, terrorist

== In popular culture ==
Pilot Charles Lindbergh, the first to fly solo across the Atlantic Ocean, made a successful landing on the outskirts of Starkville in 1927 during his Guggenheim Tour. He stayed overnight at a boarding house in the Maben community. Lindbergh later wrote about that landing in his autobiographical account of his barnstorming days, titled WE.

Starkville is one of several places in the United States that claims to have created Tee Ball. Tee Ball was popularized in Starkville in 1961 by W.W. Littlejohn and Dr. Clyde Muse, members of the Starkville Rotarians.

Johnny Cash was arrested for public drunkenness (though he described it as being picked up for picking flowers) in Starkville and held overnight at the city jail on May 11, 1965. This inspired his song "Starkville City Jail":

They're bound to get you,
Cause they got a curfew,
And you go to the Starkville city jail.

The song appears on the album At San Quentin.

From November 2 to 4, 2007, the Johnny Cash Flower Pickin' Festival was held in Starkville. At the festival, Cash was offered a symbolic posthumous pardon by the city. They honored Cash's life and music, and the festival was expected to become an annual event. The festival was started by Robbie Ward, who said: "Johnny Cash was arrested in seven places, but he only wrote a song about one of those places."

In 2021, a Mississippi Country Music Trail marker honoring Cash was installed in Starkville near the Oktibbeha County Jail.

In 2014, Gordon Ramsay visited the Hotel Chester in his series Hotel Hell in a successful attempt to help the struggling hotel remain in business.
