= Chueh =

Chueh may refer to:

- Wei Chueh (1928–2016), Chinese Buddhist monk in Taiwan
- Min Chueh Chang (1908–1991), Chinese American reproductive biologist
- Luke Chueh (born 1973), artist in lowbrow or pop surrealism art movement
- Chueh Ming-hui (born 1984), Taiwanese softball player
- T'u-chüeh; see Göktürks

== See also ==
- Jue (disambiguation)
