= William David McCain =

American academic

Fifth president The University of Southern Mississippi, 1955-75

National leader of the Sons of Confederate Veterans, 1953-93

Major General in the Mississippi National Guard

Personal details
- Born: March 29, 1907 Bellefontaine, Mississippi, U.S.
- Died: September 5, 1993 (aged 86) Hattiesburg, Mississippi, U.S.
- Party: Democrat, States' Rights Democratic Party (Dixiecrats)
- Spouse: Minnie Leicester Lenz
- Children: William D., Jr., John W., and Patricia
- Education: Delta State University, Ole Miss, and Duke University

William David McCain (March 29, 1907 – September 5, 1993) was an American educator, archivist and college president. He was a recognized leader of the Mississippi political establishment and a leader in its struggle in the 1950s and 1960s to maintain racial segregationism and what he considered the "southern way of life". He served as Mississippi state archivist, a Major General in the Mississippi National Guard, a longtime leader and promoter of the Sons of Confederate Veterans, and as the fifth president and a major architect of Mississippi Southern College (now the University of Southern Mississippi).

McCain married the former Minnie Leicester Lenz on October 3, 1931, and they were parents of three children: William D., Jr., John W., and Patricia.

== Military service ==
In 1924, McCain enlisted as a private in the Mississippi National Guard. He served with General Mark W. Clark in Italy during World War II, and also served during the Korean War. Remaining in the National Guard, he rose to the rank of Major General. As part of his military interest, McCain later very strongly promoted a large ROTC at the University of Southern Mississippi when he was president there. Over thirty officers were commissioned out of the 1970 class.

== Education ==
McCain attended Delta State University (then College), received an MA from The University of Mississippi, a Ph.D. from Duke, and an honorary Doctor of Letters from Mississippi College.

== Early career as archivist ==
After teaching at several junior colleges and both Ole Miss and Mississippi State University (then College), he became director of the Mississippi Department of Archives and History, serving from 1938 to 1955. In addition, he worked as a historian at Morristown National Historical Park in Morristown, New Jersey (1935) and served as Assistant Archivist at the US National Archives in Washington, D.C. (1935–1937).

From the late 1930s onward he enjoyed a growing reputation as an archivist and regional historian. He was a founding member of the Society of American Archivists and wrote several genealogical volumes, including histories of the McCain, Fox, Shaw, and Vance families. In addition, he wrote The Story of Jackson: A History of the Capital of Mississippi 1821-1851 (1953) and The United States and the Republic of Panama (1937).

== Sovereignty Commission ==
In the 1950s and 1960s he was also a staunch supporter of the Mississippi State Sovereignty Commission, a government agency created to undermine the civil rights movement and support segregation in the wake of the Brown v. Board of Education U. S. Supreme Court decision. He was involved in many activities and decisions which will become more fully known as the commission's archives are made available, especially his part in the Clyde Kennard affair, where Kennard’s application to University of Southern Mississippi was denied because McCain refused to provide Kennard with a list of alumini to refer him as a student. Due to Kennard being unable to meet the requirements of the application, he was ultimately denied access to further his education.

== Sons of Confederate Veterans ==
McCain re-founded the dormant Sons of Confederate Veterans organization and researched Confederate history. He un-apologetically revered the Confederacy and its policies. Today the SCV honors him in various ways. Founded in 1896, the Sons of Confederate Veterans had its first period of growth and success around and after 1900. By the late 1930s it was dying. When McCain took it over and re-founded it in 1953, it was down to 30 chapters, 1,000 members and $1,053 in assets.

After 1953, McCain threw himself into developing the moribund organization into an influential force in Mississippi and Southern politics, and a valuable personal political power base. He revived the group's abandoned publication, the Confederate Veteran, and began productive membership drives. Over the years of his stewardship from 1953 to the late 1980s membership rose to almost 20,000. He also obtained the current national headquarters facility in Columbia, TN, and a comfortable financial cushion.

=== Recognitions ===
The Sons of Confederate Veterans gives an annual literary award named for him, saying: "Dr. McCain was instrumental in reviving Sons of Confederate Veterans, an organization that thrived in post-war [Civil War] years but lost popularity during the early part of the [twentieth] century. Dr. McCain is remembered not only for his presidency at Mississippi Southern but also for his leadership in Sons of Confederate Veterans."

The library at the national headquarters in Columbia, TN, is named is his honor, and the grounds are referred to as "MAJ GEN WILLIAM D MCCAIN HQ CAMP".

Between 1951-1953 McCain served as the eighth president of the Society of American Archivists.

=== Split in organization ===
A split in the Sons of Confederate Veterans led to some Sons of Confederate Veterans local groups defining themselves as being "Dr. William D. McCain Old School" camps to indicate rejection of more racist and neo-Confederate nationalist elements. As late as 1991 they featured McCain in a recruiting video along with then Republican Senator Trent Lott of Mississippi.

== College presidency ==
On August 18, 1955, he became president of Mississippi Southern College, a minor teachers college in Hattiesburg. Here he entered on the great productive period of his career. When he took office, McCain promised to "keep the campus dusty or muddy with construction." During his tenure, twenty-five new academic and housing complexes were constructed. He built MSC into the regional educational powerhouse that became the University of Southern Mississippi.

From humble beginnings: The first five buildings erected on the University's Hattiesburg campus.

He developed an effective power base in Mississippi and was extremely persuasive with the state executive and legislative leaders of the period in promoting both the growth of Mississippi Southern and the pro-segregation cause. In the early 1970s faculty and administration at Ole Miss often heard complaints about McCain's unfair and sinister success with the state legislature in diverting resources from Ole Miss to Southern.

=== Leadership style ===
Because of his rank in the state National Guard, McCain was often addressed as "General" or, when he was absent, "the Generalissimo". He was often accused of being a tyrant who ran Mississippi Southern like a military base. Once, when testifying in a criminal proceeding in which one of his deans was charged with embezzlement, he was fined $500 and given a thirty-day suspended sentence for threatening to "beat the prosecutor's damned brains out."

When his behind the scenes influence proved insufficient, he was capable of vociferous attack. In a well publicized speech to a Hattiesburg civic club on March 15, 1969, he lashed out at the state legislature for being so paralyzed by the integration issue that they were causing higher education in Mississippi to "come to a grinding halt".

=== University status ===
In the early 1960s he obtained the support of fellow segregationist Governor Ross Barnett to elevate MSC to university status. This action paved the way for Mississippi Southern College to become a university, and on February 27, 1962, the school was officially renamed The University of Southern Mississippi (USM).

President McCain with Gov. Ross Barnett and Lt. Gov. Paul B. Johnson at signing of bill granting university status.

=== Promoter of segregation ===
He was a prominent and active supporter of the state political establishment's racial policies. McCain was a founder and led it as an authoritarian general leading his troops for decades.

He maintained that the Thirteenth Amendment was not legally part of the U.S. Constitution. As a leader of the pro-segregationist White Citizens' Council and a member of its speakers bureau, he made numerous trips north to present the pro-segregation case.

In a period when pressure was growing nationally to integrate the state's institutions of higher learning, he was well known to vehemently oppose the prospect of having any black students at Mississippi Southern. In recognition of this, in 1964 James Meredith made his attempt to enter Ole Miss rather than Southern, thinking success more likely there.

=== Clyde Kennard ===
When Clyde Kennard, a black Korean War veteran attempted to enroll at Mississippi Southern in the late 1950s, McCain made major efforts with local black leaders, the state political establishment and the Mississippi State Sovereignty Commission to prevent it. The Commission sent Zack J. Van Landingham, a "subversive investigator", to assist McCain. He handled Kennard's file personally and had John Reiter, the school security chief, look for any criminal record from Kennard's time in Chicago. On September 15, 1959, Kennard was falsely arrested by constables Charlie Ward and Lee Daniel for reckless driving upon returning to his car from a meeting with President McCain. After he was jailed, Lee and Daniels perjured themselves before racist Justice of the Peace T. C. Hobby, claiming to have found five half pints of whiskey, along with other liquor.

Kennard was twice arrested on trumped-up criminal charges and eventually sentenced to seven years in the state prison. McCain's direct involvement in this incident is unclear. He was certainly as aware as other intimate members of the state political establishment were that the charges were fraudulent but made no public objection.

=== Voice of southern conservatism ===
On September 9, 1960, at the very time McCain was so forcefully seeking to keep Clyde Kennard out of Mississippi Southern, he made a trip to Chicago sponsored by the Mississippi State Sovereignty Commission, where he explained to the Pro American Forum the reality of Mississippi life saying that those blacks who sought to desegregate Southern schools were "imports" from the North. (Kennard was, in fact, a native and resident of Hattiesburg.)

McCain said, "We insist that educationally and socially, we maintain a segregated society ... In all fairness, I admit that we are not encouraging Negro voting." "The Negroes prefer that control of the government remain in the white man's hands."

He was equally vocal in Mississippi, having become well practiced in the Cold War anti-communist rhetoric of the period. He closely echoed conservative Republican presidential candidate Barry Goldwater, who heavily carried the Mississippi white vote in 1964. On March 19, 1964, McCain gave the keynote speech at the annual convention of the Mississippi Education Association. He blamed Soviet leader Nikita Khrushchev, Communist China, and Fidel Castro for fomenting the civil rights movement in general and particularly the move to integrate public education in Mississippi. He labeled the movement un-Christian, quoting Jesus Christ: "For the poor always ye have with ye ..."

McCain engaged in verified homophobic acts of purges and witch hunts of faculty and students.

=== 1965 integration ===
By the fall of 1965 both Ole Miss and Mississippi State University had been integrated—the former violently, the latter peacefully. University of Southern Mississippi leaders, such as President McCain, had come to realize that the battle to maintain segregation was lost. Therefore, they made extensive confidential plans for the admission and attendance of their first black students. A faculty guardian and tutor was secretly appointed for each. The campus police department had very strict orders to prevent or quickly stop any incident involving the two black students. Student athletic, fraternity, and political leaders were recruited to keep the calm and protect the university from such bad publicity as Ole Miss had suffered from its reaction to James Meredith.

As a result, black students Gwendolyn Elaine Armstrong and Raylawni Branch were enrolled without incident in September 1965.

=== Struggles in the '60s ===
McCain had always run the university very much as the authoritarian commander of a military camp. This management style was challenged by the rebellious spirit of the 1960s on American university campuses. For example in 1966 and 1967 he attempted with economic pressure and slanted performance evaluations to silence several outspoken liberal faculty members. This led to a confrontation with various liberal groups, including the Young Democrats led by future Governor Bill Waller. This resulted in turmoil throughout April 1967, and finally to a riot on May 12, which required the intervention of the state police.

As the years passed after 1965, McCain gradually lost the iron disciplined control he had held over the university. After the Jackson State killings of student protesters on Thursday and Friday, May 14–15, 1970, some 75 black students staged a sit-down at his home and then his office. Their demands included the integration of the campus police, the establishment of black social sororities and fraternities, and the inclusion of blacks on the faculty. Preparing for a protracted process of negotiations, McCain asked the black students to elect a leadership group with which he would deal.

At this time he was also in a struggle to keep the ACLU off his campus. This culminated in January 1972, with a Federal District Court order to grant the ACLU a charter to operate on campus.

In the twenty years that McCain served as president, enrollment grew from 3000 in 1955 to more than 11,000 in 1975.

When he retired in 1975, a Chair of History and the university archival library were named in his honor. He then kept an office in the library as President Emeritus. He died on September 5, 1993, and is interred at Lakewood Memorial Park in Jackson, Mississippi.

== Later life ==
In the later decades of his life McCain was best known for his work in successfully—if highhandedly—building a small teachers college into the regional educational powerhouse that became the University of Southern Mississippi and for his anti-integration activities in the 1950s and 1960s. He was also recognized regionally as an author, lecturer, historian on the Confederacy and post-Civil War period, archivist and genealogist.

== Books ==
- Medgar Evers by Jennie Brown, Holloway House Publishing, 1994, 192 pages
