= MFJ Enterprises =

American radio equipment manufacturer

- Type: Private
- Industry: Electronics
- Founded: 1972
- Area served: Worldwide
- Key people: Martin F. Jue (founder)
- Products: Amateur radio equipment
- Revenue: $12,600,000 (2010)
- Number of employees: 150 (at main location)
- Subsidiaries: Vectronics
- Website: mfjenterprises.com

MFJ Enterprises is a American manufacturer specializing in a wide range of products for the amateur radio market. The company focuses on station accessories, including antenna tuners and antenna switching equipment. MFJ was founded in 1972 by Martin F. Jue. As of 2014, the company was recognized as the largest producer of amateur radio products worldwide.

Representative products have been described in QST Magazine and CQ Amateur Radio.

The initials "MFJ" in the company name are those of the founder, Martin F. Jue (ham radio callsign K5FLU).

On April 26, 2024, Martin F. Jue announced that as of May 17, 2024, the company will cease on-site production at their Starkville, Mississippi, facility. Ameritron, Hy-Gain, Cushcraft, Mirage, and Vectronics brand products will be affected by the shutdown.

On April 15, 2026, ITU Corporation of Linton, Indiana announced it is acquiring the world famous Hy-gain and Cushcraft antenna brands including all commercial and amateur communication equipment brands from MFJ. Including Ameritron amplifiers, tuners, analyzers and other devices, along with the premium Mirage HF, UHF and VHF amplifiers. This positions ITU as one of the largest manufacturers of radio communications equipment. Production should resume at the new 15 acre facility in Linton Indiana by the end of 2026.

== Subsidiaries ==
MFJ owned five subsidiary companies:

- Ameritron HF Amplifiers
- Hy-Gain Antennas and Rotators
- Mirage VHF/UHF Amplifiers
- Vectronics
- Cushcraft Amateur Antennas, an antenna manufacturer that has expanded outside amateur radio into RFID technology.
