= Mount Carmel, Mississippi =

- Ghost town
- Location within Mississippi Location within the United States
- Coordinates: 31°38′43″N 89°47′43″W
- Country: United States
- State: Mississippi
- County: Jefferson Davis
- Elevation: 490 ft (150 m)
- Time zone: UTC-6 (Central (CST))
  - Summer (DST): UTC-5 (CDT)
- GNIS feature ID: 673998

Mount Carmel is a ghost town in Jefferson Davis County, Mississippi, United States.

Once a thriving 19th-century community, little remains today of Mount Carmel but a museum located within a historic home.

== History ==
Mount Carmel is one of the oldest settlements in Jefferson Davis County.

Mt. Zion Methodist Church was established near Mount Carmel in 1817.

John Ragan, a Revolutionary soldier from Virginia, laid out the town in 1819, in what was then Covington County. The plan provided for lots, streets, and a large central square with two springs. Mount Carmel incorporated in 1835, and had two or three stores, and two churches.

The town also had a well-regarded co-educational school, Mount Carmel Academy, which opened prior to 1830. At one point it had 70 to 80 students. The school moved in 1845.

Benjamin L.C. Wailes traveled through the community in 1852 and wrote in his journal:

After crossing [the] Bouie over a bridge (passing through the bottom land in which there is a good deal of large oak & gum mixed with some Shortleaf pine) ascended a considerable eminence to a level table land of Oak and hickory, on which the village of Mount Carmel is situated. About 70 inhabitants. Two or three considerable Country Stores. More business [is] done [here] than at Williamsburg, and the situation is much handsomer, & the buildings (tho' plain frame) [are] better.

Around 1873, John Fielding Holloway built a large house in Mount Carmel, and it remains the community's only 19th-century structure.

Mount Carmel was by-passed during the construction of the Gulf and Ship Island Railroad in 1899, and the Mississippi Central Railroad in 1903. As a result, many businesses and residents moved to one of the nearby railway towns of Prentiss, Bassfield, or Collins. In 1904, Mount Carmel was officially unincorporated.

The nearly abandoned community began to grow again during the early 20th century, when African-Americans began purchasing land in the town and surrounding community. The new community began to prosper, and contained all the essential services, goods and farm products needed for self-sufficiency. In 1911, Robert Decatur "Cap" Polk, a leading African-American planter and businessmen, purchased the Holloway House, and installed a large and modern farm on the nearby property. Now called the John Fielding Holloway House, it remains one of the oldest continuously inhabited settlement in Jefferson Davis County. The home is a historical and cultural center, and tours are available.

== Notable people ==
- Raylawni Branch, Civil Rights leader and U.S. Air Force officer; grew up in Mount Carmel.
- Alexander Graves, U.S. Representative from Missouri.
