= The Cotton District =

Community in Starkville, Mississippi

Coordinates: 33.459972°N 88.802969°W

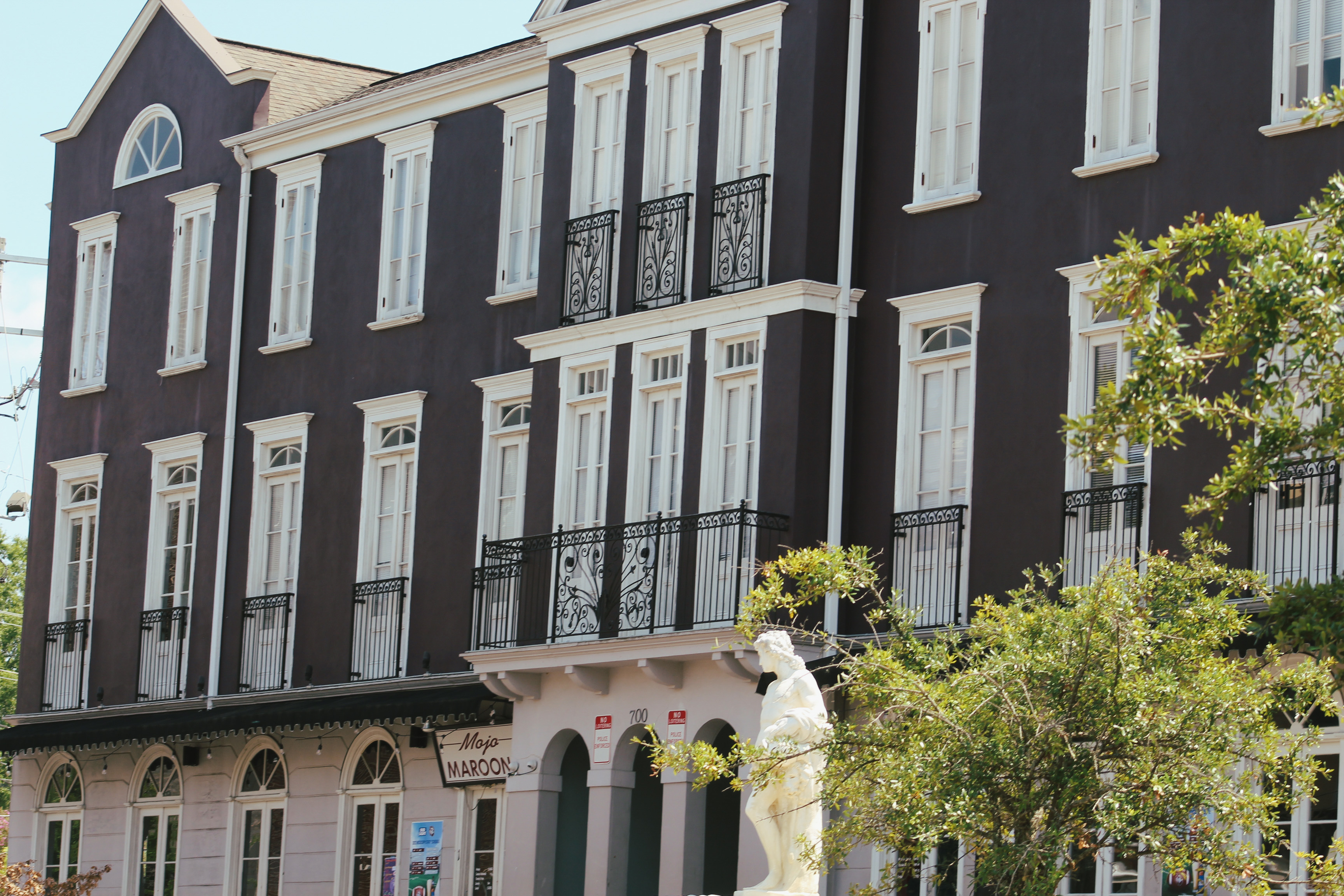
The Cotton District in August 2022

The Cotton District is a community located in Starkville, Mississippi. It was founded by Dan Camp, who was the developer, owner and property manager of much of the area. It is significant for its use of traditional architecture and as an example of traditional neighborhood development practices in the 1960s.

Video of the Cotton District in Starkville, Mississippi.

The Cotton District has elements of Greek Revival mixed with Classical or Victorian. Many of these ideas came from Camp's own travels to Europe and parts of the United States, like Charleston and New Orleans. The Cotton District is a walkable neighborhood that contains restaurants and bars such as Bin612, Two Brother's Smoked Meats, The Landing and more. It also has hundreds of unique residential units, many which are filled by college students and young professionals.

The area is home to the annual Cotton District Arts Festival which now boasts as many as 40,000 attendants each year. It also formerly hosted the annual Bulldog Bash, which draws over 20,000 people for the festival's free concerts and has featured artists such as Third Eye Blind, Gavin Degraw, Sister Hazel, Howie Day, Will Hoge, Hardy, and Edwin McCain among others.

Starkville is adjacent to the campus of Mississippi State University and is also a registered retirement community.
