= Henderson High School (Mississippi) =

Historically black school in Starkville, Mississippi

Location
- 200 Dr Martin Luther King Jr Dr W Starkville, Mississippi; United States
- Coordinates: 33.468°N 88.822°W

Information
- Former name: Oktibbeha County Training School
- Type: Public
- Opened: 1927
- Grades: 9–12
- Nickname: Tigers
- Last updated: 29 December 2017

Henderson High School was a public secondary school in Starkville, Mississippi. United States. It served as the high school for black students until the public schools were integrated in 1970. Grades k–8 were also located on the same property. After integration, the buildings served as a junior high school and later as an elementary school.

== History ==
Until 1910, a school existed for black children on Gillespie Street. In 1910 it was deemed completely unsuitable and a new school known as Public School Number 2 was built with money appropriated by the city, plus the $2 per student provided by the state and the $200 generated by the negro poll tax.

Prior to 1926, African American children in Starkville were able to get an education of sorts at what was known as Public School Number 2. In 1926, the city began construction on a new school, which was opened in 1927 as the Oktibbeha County Training School (OCTS) in a wooden frame building with the purpose of expanding educational opportunities for Starkville's black residents. Funding of $12,700 was provided by the city, the Rosenwald Fund, and by local African-American citizens. As "Training School" was a code word for prejudice, implying that black students could not be fully educated, but only trained, the school was renamed W.C. Henderson High School after local African-American educator Willie Chiles Henderson in the 1950s. Henderson had been a student at Public School Number 2 in 1918, and later returned as a teacher when it was a 10th grade institution. Henderson served as principal through the 1964 school year, after which he was replaced by Clell Ward. Many civil rights workers believed that the naming of schools after black principals was done to help perpetuate segregation.

=== Integration ===
Although the black schools were supposed to have been equal to the white schools, the black schools were in fact far inferior. Facilities were poorer, and the textbooks used were ones discarded from the white public schools. The teachers were less prepared as well; when the schools were integrated fewer than half of the teachers from the black school met the requirements to continue teaching. In 1970, the public schools finally integrated. White citizen's councils resisted, opening Starkville Academy as a segregation academy for white students and illegally providing utilities to the academy at public expense. Former Henderson High principal Fenton Peters, who remained principal of what was then known as Henderson Junior High, and who later became principal of Starkville High School received visits from the KKK, who burned a cross in his yard and exploded dynamite nearby. In 1970, the building which had been the original Rosenwald School, adjacent to Henderson, was burned to the ground.

The last senior class graduated in 1970. As with most black schools of the day, Henderson ceased to exist as a high school, but continued as a school for younger students.

In 2010 Henderson-Ward Stewart Elementary was renovated for a cost of $4.8 million.

== Campus ==
Prior to 1926, various citizens in cooperation with the Julius Rosenwald Fund had provided funding for a building known as the Rosenwald School. This school was burned to the ground in 1970, during federally mandated integration. In 1926, the OCTS was added. In 1954, the elementary school (later known as Stewart Elementary) was added at the top of the hill. In 1959, the two story brick building known as Henderson High School was opened. In 1963 the new Henderson Elementary (now known as Ward) was added. In 1966 a metal vocational building and football complex were added.

== Notable alumni ==
- Richard E. Holmes, First black student to enroll in Mississippi State University
- Ben McGee, NFL football player played 8 seasons with the Pittsburgh Steelers.
- John Peoples, President of Jackson State University from 1967-1984
