= James Shaw (American football coach) =

American football player and coach (1938–2018)

Biographical details
- Born: April 2, 1938; Fayette, Alabama, U.S.
- Died: 2018

Playing career
- 1959: Miles
- Position: Halfback

Coaching career (HC unless noted)
- c. 1961–1965: Carver HS (AL)
- 1966–1968: Alcorn A&M (off. backfield)
- c. 1970: Eastern Michigan (backfield)
- 1972–1975: Southern (OC)
- 1976–1979: Arkansas–Pine Bluff

Head coaching record
- Overall: 15–24–1 (college); 45–3–4 (high school)

James Edward Shaw (April 2, 1938 2018) was an American football coach. He served as the head football coach at the University of Arkansas at Pine Bluff for four seasons, from 1976 to 1979, compiling a record of 15–24–1. A graduated of Miles College in Birmingham, Alabama, Shaw began his coaching career at Carver High School in Bessemer, Alabama. He was assistant football coach at Alcorn Agricultural and Mechanical College—now known as Alcorn State University—from 1966 to 1968 and at Eastern Michigan University, where he earned a master's degree in health and physical education. Shaw was the offensive coordinator at Southern University for four seasons, from 1972 to 1975, prior to being hired at Arkansas–Pine Bluff in January 1976.

== Head coaching record ==
=== College ===
Year	Team	Overall	Conference	Standing	Bowl/playoffs
Arkansas–Pine Bluff Golden Lions (NCAA Division II independent) (1976–1979)
1976	Arkansas–Pine Bluff	5–5			
1977	Arkansas–Pine Bluff	4–5–1			
1978	Arkansas–Pine Bluff	4–6			
1979	Arkansas–Pine Bluff	2–8			
Arkansas–Pine Bluff:		15–24–1			
Total:		15–24–1			
