= Jason P Jue =

American computer scientist

- Scientific career
- Fields: optical networking, wireless networks
- Workplaces: University of Texas at Dallas
- Website: Dr. Jason P Jue

Jason P Jue is a professor of computer science and the director of the Advanced Networks Research Lab at the University of Texas at Dallas.

== Education ==
Jue received his B.Sc. in Electrical and Computer Science from University of California, Berkeley in 1990. He then received his M.Sc. in Electrical Engineering from University of California, Los Angeles in 1991. He earned his Ph.D. in Electrical and Computer Engineering from University of California, Davis in 1999.

== Career ==
Jue is Professor of Computer Science at the University of Texas at Dallas as well as being the director of the Advanced Networks Research Lab at the University of Texas at Dallas. During his research he has published over 30 journal articles and 90 conference and workshop papers.

== Awards and honors ==
- Senior Member, IEEE
- Best Paper Award, IEEE ICC 2011 Optical Networks and Systems Symposium, 2011.
- Best Paper Award, 14th International Conference of Optical Network Design and Modeling, 2010
- NSF Career Award, 2002

== Books published ==
- J. P. Jue and V. M. Vokkarane, Optical Burst Switched Networks, Springer, 2005.
- Lightpath Establishment in Wavelength-Routed WDM Optical Networks.
