= Raylawni Branch =

American activist (born 1941)

- Born: 1941 (age 84–85); Hattiesburg, Mississippi
- Political party: Republican

Raylawni Branch (born 1941) is a Black Mississippi pioneer of the Civil Rights Movement, a professional nursing educator and US Air Force Reserve officer. She is best known for her leading role in the integration of the University of Southern Mississippi (Hattiesburg) in 1965, which was peaceful as opposed to the violent riot triggered by white racism after the enrollment of James Meredith at the University of Mississippi (Oxford) in 1962.

== Early life ==
She was raised in Hattiesburg, Prentiss, and Mount Carmel, Mississippi, and in Chicago, Illinois. When her family moved from Hattiesburg to Chicago, they were homeless two or three times, living in a park. She does not have good memories about living in the North. She went to schools that were predominantly white where the teacher never spoke to her.

She was again homeless in Chicago after the family lost its home over her father's legal problems. After her father died in the Cook County Jail in 1955, the family returned to Mississippi.

By the time she was graduated from the eighth grade, she had moved eleven times and been in eight schools. Back in Mississippi, Branch attended Hattiesburg’s Royal Street (then Rowan) High School and graduated in 1959. There she learned political activism, pride, and how to work the system from Marjorie Chambers, her history teacher. She was also encouraged by listening to Dr. Martin Luther King Jr.'s speeches on the radio.

== Civil rights activism ==
As a teenager, she worked in a restaurant named Fat's Kitchen in Hattiesburg’s Mobile Street black business district. There she met a regular customer, Clyde Kennard, whose tragic attempt to integrate the University of Southern Mississippi had begun in 1956 and was to play out before Branch’s young eyes. In 1959 she saw Kennard on the morning of his appointment with arch-segregationist Dr. William David McCain, president of (then) Mississippi Southern College, to discuss his enrollment application. She found Kennard the kind of person who actually believed in the goodness of man. He even had a good opinion of Dr. McCain, who was a well known racist and segregationist. He thought that he did not need any protection. Branch and others asked him to "Let someone go with you." But Kennard saw no need.

The meeting with McCain resulted in his arrest on false criminal charges and the beginning of a notorious miscarriage of justice which led to Kennard's early death at 36 because of bungled cancer treatment in the Mississippi prison system. After a second false arrest, Branch attended the trial and was among those who tried to get Johnny Lee Roberts, the prosecution's suborned witness, to tell the truth or flee the state. Roberts refused, fearing that the KKK would harm his family left in Mississippi.

After high school graduation she tried the North again as a migrant worker on farms in Michigan, living in little shacks with no utilities, then again returned to Mississippi.

From 1959 to 1965 she was a homemaker, married and had three children. When northern civil rights activists became active in Mississippi in the early 1960s with the Delta Ministry and similar groups, she became very active, serving as secretary of the Forrest County NAACP and a member of the Council of Federated Organizations, the Student Nonviolent Coordinating Committee and the Southern Christian Leadership Conference. She participated in several activities, including the August 28, 1963 March on Washington for Jobs and Freedom at which she was one of the 250,000 to hear Dr. Martin Luther King Jr. gave his "I Have a Dream" speech. She integrated the Greyhound Lines and Trailways Transportation System bus stations in Hattiesburg, and was the first African American ever hired at the local Big Yank clothing factory. She also became the first African American ever offered a position as a switchboard operator at the local telephone company.

In the NAACP she knew well people such as Aaron Henry, Charles Evers, and Medgar Evers. The night Medgar Evers was assassinated, June 12, 1963, she went to Jackson and sat with the widow Myrlie Evers-Williams.

In 1965, at age twenty-four, Branch was Secretary of the Forrest County, Mississippi NAACP when it recruited her to integrate the last major holdout of the Mississippi university system, the University of Southern Mississippi. The NAACP offered to pay her tuition but not living expenses – a factor which led to her decision to withdraw after the first year. On September 6, 1965, she (then Raylawni Young) and eighteen-year-old Hattiesburg native Elaine Armstrong became the first African American students at Mississippi Southern.

By the fall of 1965 both Ole Miss and Mississippi State University had been integrated – the former violently, the latter peacefully. University of Southern Mississippi leaders, such as President William David McCain, had come to realize that the battle to maintain segregation was lost. Therefore, they made extensive confidential plans for the admission and attendance of Branch and Armstrong. A faculty guardian and tutor was secretly appointed for each. The same campus police department which had attempted to railroad Kennard to prison when he attempted to enroll, now had very strict orders to prevent or quickly stop any incident involving the two black students. Student athletic, fraternity, and political leaders were recruited to keep the calm and protect the university from such bad publicity Ole Miss had suffered from its reaction to James Meredith.

As a result, Branch had only one minor negative experience in her year at the university.

She majored in Pre-Medicine and had a work-study job on campus in the biology department. The two women attended classes accompanied by six bodyguards, one of them a local policeman who had once violently attacked her in a civil rights confrontation. The university administration appointed Dr. Geoffrey Fish, an oceanographer who taught biology as her guardian and tutor. Fish took a genuine interest in both women, gave them advice and jobs in work-study. He was very kind, listened to them, was like father figure to them.

Today, Branch says that she was treated just like everybody else, and that the poor grades she earned were because of her financial and family situation and that, because of the poor, substandard segregated high school education she had received, she spoke a substandard English.

Attending the university was very, very hard on her. At this time (September 1965) she had three young children, aged three, five, and six, to care for. Her first husband had mental illness and wouldn't allow her to study at night. The NAACP paid my tuition, but no money to live on. She did earn $80 weekly from the student job and received minimal help from the Delta Ministry, from Vernon Dahmer, and similar sources.

She was well acquainted with civil rights martyr Vernon Dahmer, working with him in the NAACP and voter registration.

From the early 1960s she often attended meetings at Dahmer's house where his wife Ellie would watch the road for danger from the KKK while they met. Dahmer had been active in defense of Kennard during his struggle with William David McCain and the Mississippi State Sovereignty Commission over Kennard's attempt to enter the University of Southern Mississippi and he was equally supportive of Branch's effort. In January 1966, on the evening before Dahmer's home was firebombed by the KKK, he had sent to her boxes of groceries to help feed her family.

After separating from her husband in 1966, Branch left Mississippi for New York, where she had a scholarship to study nursing at St. John's Episcopal School of Nursing. While in the North for school she was very active in the Anti-Vietnam War movement. October 21, 1967, she was among the 35,000 anti-war protesters organized by the National Mobilization Committee to End the War in Vietnam, gathered for a demonstration at the Defense Department, called the "March on The Pentagon".

She received her bachelor's degree in Nursing from the University of Miami in 1969.

Having joined the Air Force reserves in 1975, she rose to lieutenant colonel assigned to Keesler Air Force Base, and stationed at Lowry Air Force Base in Denver, Colorado. In the Air Force she has been on flying status, been a chief nurse, been the director of an operating room, and assistant director.

Branch returned to Hattiesburg in 1987, and is very glad that she did. The next year she enrolled in a Master's program at University of Southern Mississippi. She received her master's degree in Community Health Nursing, with a minor in Education, in 1993.

Branch was Instructor of associate degree Nursing at Pearl River Community College and Nurse Coordinator, American Red Cross of South Central Mississippi. In March 2004 she retired from Instructor of Nursing at the University of Southern Mississippi.

In 2003 she ran for the Mississippi State Senate as a Republican.
