= Martin F. Jue =

American inventor and entrepreneur

- Born: Vicksburg, Mississippi
- Citizenship: United States of America
- Education: Mississippi State University; Georgia Institute of Technology
- Occupations: Entrepreneur inventor amateur radio enthusiast
- Employer: MFJ Enterprises
- Title: President
- Call sign: K5FLU

Martin F. Jue is an American business personality, inventor and founder/owner of several companies, including MFJ Enterprises, Hy-Gain, Cushcraft, Ameritron, Vectronics and others, all of which manufacture products for the amateur radio industry. He holds numerous patents on specialized technology, especially in the area of T network field tuners.

== Early life ==
Martin F. Jue was born in Vicksburg to a Chinese American family and whose own great-grandfather helped build the transcontinental railroad across America in the late 1860s. He grew up in the small delta town of Hollandale, Mississippi.

Jue's father passed away when he was five years old, and he was raised in his extended family household that, at times, included 11 or more members. He spent much of his childhood living and working in the back of his family-owned grocery store. When he was a child, he developed an early interest in electronics and radio. He would build devices from scrap materials. For instance, he built his first crystal radio at age eight, which sparked his desire to become an engineer.

When he was in high school, he built a radio telemetry system for his science fair project, using improvised components to measure environmental conditions such as humidity, light, and wind. His project won both his school-level and the state-level science fair.

== Career ==
In 1966, Jue graduated from Mississippi State University's Bagley College of Engineering, which, in 2014, honored him as a Distinguished Fellow. He later earned a master's degree from Georgia Institute of Technology in 1971.

After graduating, Jue returned to temporarily run his family grocery store, gaining practical experience in business operations, marketing, and customer relations. This gave him the skills he used as he founded MFJ Enterprises. He later became an engineering professor at Mississippi State University.

In October, 1972, while still teaching, Jue began manufacturing a CW filter kit in a room of the now-defunct Stark Hotel in Starkville, Mississippi. In the early years of production, much of the work was done by his students for academic credit or compensation. Over the next forty years, MFJ would grow to become the largest manufacturer of amateur radio products in the world, and would garner numerous honors.

For a few years, Jue managed MFJ Enterprises and his teaching responsibilities simultaneously. He eventually left his teaching job once the company had grown to over 30 employees. MFJ Enterprises expanded its product line significantly, manufacturing between 1,000 and 2,000 products, and Jue had a hand in developing most of them. MFJ grew into one of the largest manufacturers of amateur radio products in the world and distributed to approximately 35 countries.

In 2012, the American Radio Relay League (ARRL) awarded Jue the ARRL Special Achievement Award, honoring him for innovation in the field of amateur radio. Jue also serves on the board of On2Locate and Magnolia Intertie Inc.

After more than five decades in operation, Jue began to slow down MFJ Enterprises's operations. Following the COVID-19 pandemic, he announced his decision to retire after roughly 52 years. Rather than closing the company down immediately, he continued company operations while employees transitioned to other roles, showing his leadership style and his care for his employees.

== Personal life ==
Jue lives in Starkville with his wife Betty Quong Jue, where he is a member of the Starkville Rotary Club, board president of the Boys and Girls Clubs of the Golden Triangle, and board member of the Mississippi Children’s Museum.

He has been inducted into the CQ Hall of Fame (2001) and the QRP (2009) Hall of Fame. In 2011, he was awarded the Ham Radio Outlet Certificate Of Honor. He is a member of the Alabama Historical Radio Society in Birmingham, Alabama.

== Legacy ==
Jue is recognized for shaping the accessibility and culture of the amateur radio industry through his "making quality affordable" philosophy. His approach placed the emphasis on designing practical and cost effective equipment that can be used by amateur radio operators.

He was committed to domestic manufacturing and local economic development, prioritizing job creation in Mississippi rather than outsourcing production overseas. MFJ Enterprises developed a reputation for being a stable and community-oriented workplace. The company is noted for its long employee retention. One of its notable employees is Phyliss Randle, who is a long time employee whose tenure spanned roughly 45 years and also included multiple generations of her family working at the company.
