= John A. Peoples =

American educator (born 1926)

John Arthur Peoples Jr. (born August 26, 1926) is an American former educator who was President of Jackson State University from 1967 to 1984.

== History ==
Peoples was born in August 1926 in Starkville, Mississippi. Unlike many African-Americans in the community, his family owned their home as well as rental property. He learned to read before attending school. He graduated from the segregated black school Oktibbeha County Training School in 1944. In 1945 he enlisted in the United States Marine Corps, where he served for three years. He studied mathematics at Jackson State, where he received a B.S. in 1950, then went to the University of Chicago, where he received an M.A. in Math in 1951. He taught math from 1951 through 1958 at Froebel School in Gary, Indiana, before taking an assistant principal position at Lincoln School in 1958 and becoming the principal of Banneker School in 1962. During this period, he earned a PhD in higher education from the University of Chicago, graduating in 1961. He returned to Jackson State as a mathematics professor in 1964, advancing to vice president in 1966 and president in 1967.

In 1970, police fired 150 rounds of ammunition into a women's dormitory on campus, killing two students and injuring 12 more. Peoples was instrumental in de-escalating the situation and preventing further bloodshed. He closed the school for the summer and mailed students their degrees.

During his career, Peoples was director of the American Association of Higher Education from 1971 to 1974, and served on the National Endowment for the Humanities committee. He was the American Council on Education's first African-American chairman and director. Peoples is a member of the Jackson State University Hall of Fame and the Southwestern Athletic Conference Hall of Fame. He received the National Black College Hall of Fame Lifetime Achievement Award in 1993. The John Peoples Science Building at JSU is named after him.

== Personal life ==
Peoples turned 100 on August 26, 2026.
