= Clyde Kennard =

American soldier and civil rights leader (1927–1963)

- Kennard, then terminally ill, meeting sister Sara Tarpley on arrival in Chicago after release in 1963.
- Born: June 12, 1927; Hattiesburg, Mississippi, U.S.
- Died: July 4, 1963 (aged 36); Chicago, Illinois, U.S.

Clyde Kennard (June 12, 1927 – July 4, 1963) was an American Korean War veteran and civil rights leader from Hattiesburg, Mississippi. In the 1950s, he attempted several times to enroll at the all-white Mississippi Southern College (now the University of Southern Mississippi) to complete his undergraduate degree started at the University of Chicago. Although the United States Supreme Court had ruled in 1954 that segregation of public schools was unconstitutional, the college rejected Kennard. He was among the thousands of local activists in the 1940s and 1950s who pressed for their rights.

After Kennard published a letter in the local paper about integrated education, the Mississippi State Sovereignty Commission, a state-supported agency, conspired to have him arrested on false charges. He was convicted and sentenced to seven years at Parchman Penitentiary, the state's notorious high-security prison. Kennard became terminally ill with cancer. The state governor refused to pardon him, but released Kennard on parole in January 1963. Kennard died six months later. After publication in 2005 of evidence that Kennard had been framed, supporters tried to secure a posthumous pardon for him, but Governor Haley Barbour refused. Supporters gained Barbour's cooperation in petitioning the court to review Kennard's case, and in 2006, his conviction was overturned completely.

== Early life and education ==
Kennard was born in Hattiesburg, Mississippi, in 1927. At age 12, he went to Chicago and lived with his older sister Sara, in order to go full-time to public school. Kennard graduated from Wendell Phillips High School. He enlisted in the US Army, serving for seven years: first in Germany after World War II, then during the Korean War serving as a paratrooper.

Kennard returned to Chicago after his service, starting college at the University of Chicago. In 1955, after completing his junior year, Kennard returned to Hattiesburg to help his mother after his stepfather died. Kennard had purchased land for her in nearby Eatonville, Mississippi, where he started a chicken farm. Kennard taught Sunday school at the Mary Magdalene Baptist Church he attended in Eatonville.

== Fight for education ==
Given his need to stay in Hattiesburg, Kennard sought to enroll at Mississippi Southern College, a state institution, in 1956, 1957, and 1959. It was still segregated despite the ruling by the US Supreme Court in Brown v. Board of Education (1954) that segregation of public schools was unconstitutional. Mississippi governor James P. Coleman offered to have the state pay Kennard's tuition elsewhere at a private college, but Kennard declined. He preferred that college as it was the closest to his home, a major factor given his family situation.

On December 6, 1958, Kennard published a letter in the Hattiesburg American newspaper. He wrote that he was a "segregationist by nature" but "integrationist by choice." Kennard gave a reasoned explanation as to why segregation in education was impractical and bound to be replaced by an integrated system.

Zack Van Landingham of the Mississippi State Sovereignty Commission, which ostensibly encouraged the state's public image but worked to suppress activists for civil rights, urged J. H. White, the African-American president of Mississippi Vocational College, to persuade Kennard to end his quest at Mississippi Southern College. When Kennard could not be dissuaded, Van Landingham and Dudley Connor, a Hattiesburg lawyer, collaborated to suppress his activism. Files from the Sovereignty Commission, which the state opened for public review in 1998, showed that its officials went to the extreme of considering forcing Kennard into an accident or bombing his car to stop his quest. Instead, they framed Kennard for a criminal offense.

== Framing, conviction and imprisonment ==
The Sovereignty Commission conspired to have Kennard framed for a crime. On September 15, 1959, he was arrested in Hattiesburg by constables Charlie Ward and Lee Daniels for reckless driving. After Kennard was jailed, Ward and Daniels claimed before Justice of the Peace T. C. Hobby to have found five half-pints of whiskey, along with other liquor, under the seat of his car. Mississippi was a "dry" state, and possession of liquor was illegal until 1966. Kennard was convicted and fined $600, but he soon became the victim of an unofficial local economic boycott (also a tactic of the Sovereignty Commission and White Citizens Councils), which cut off his credit.

Kennard was arrested again on September 25, 1961, with an alleged accomplice for the theft of $25 worth of chicken feed from the Forrest County Cooperative warehouse. Kennard was prosecuted and his illiterate "accomplice," Johnny Lee Roberts, testified against him. On November 21, 1960, an all-white jury deliberated 10 minutes and found Kennard guilty. At this time, because of having been disenfranchised under the 1890 constitution and unable to vote in Mississippi, blacks were also excluded from juries.

Kennard was sentenced to seven years in prison, to be served in Parchman Penitentiary, the state's high-security facility. This sentence prevented his ever applying again to any of Mississippi's all-white colleges. Roberts was given five years' probation and freed. In 2005, when an investigation was re-opened into the case, Roberts testified under oath that Kennard was innocent: "Kennard did not ask me to steal, Kennard did not ask me to break into the co-op, Kennard did not ask me to do anything illegal."

Just after the conclusion of the trial, Medgar Evers, president of the Mississippi chapter of the NAACP, was cited by the court for contempt after he issued a statement that Kennard's conviction was "a mockery of judicial justice." Evers was fined $100 and sentenced to 30 days in jail, but on June 12, 1961, the Mississippi Supreme Court overturned his conviction.

== Cancer and death ==
While imprisoned in 1961, Kennard was diagnosed with colon cancer and taken to the University of Mississippi hospital for surgery. The medical staff recommended that he be put in their custody or that they be allowed to make regular visits to check on his condition. Authorities sent him back to Parchman Prison, where he worked as a laborer.

Learning of his illness, civil rights leaders in Hattiesburg embarked on a campaign to secure Kennard's release. After the story gained national attention in 1963, as the Civil Rights Movement was growing across the Deep South, Mississippi Governor Ross Barnett gave Kennard an "indefinite suspended sentence" or parole.

Kennard was released on January 30, 1963. Comedian Dick Gregory paid for his flight to Chicago for medical treatment. Kennard twice underwent surgery at Billings Hospital on the University of Chicago campus over the next five months, but he died of cancer 10 days after the second procedure.

On July 7, a funeral service for Kennard was held at Metropolitan Funeral Parlor in Chicago. A poem he wrote on April 16, 1962, was read to the congregation. Kennard had titled the poem "Ode to the Death Angel":

Oh here you come again
Old chilly death of Ol'
To plot out life
And test immortal soul

I saw you fall against the raging sea
I cheated you then and now you'll not catch me

I know your face
It's known in every race
Your speed is fast
And along the way
Your shadow you cast

High in the sky
You thought you had me then
I landed safely
But here you are again

I see you paused upon that forward pew
When you think I'm asleep
I'm watching you
Why must you hound me so everywhere I go?

It's true my eyes are dim
My hands are growing cold
Well take me on then, that
I might at last become my soul

Kennard was buried three days later in his family's plot at Mary Magdelene Cemetery in Hattiesburg, Mississippi.

== Pardon efforts ==
On December 31, 2005, Jerry Mitchell, an award-winning investigative reporter, published an interview with the informant Johnny Lee Roberts. He asserted that his testimony in 1960 was false, and that Kennard had no connection to the crime. Mitchell, who had been investigating the case for many years, had previously aided investigations in some other infamous "cold cases" from the Civil Rights Era.

In 2006, the cause was joined by teacher Barry Bradford and three of his high school students from Illinois: Mona Ghadiri, Agnes Mazur, and Callie McCune, as well as Professor Steven A. Drizin of the Northwestern University School of Law, Center On Wrongful Convictions. They led a coalition to convince Mississippi Governor Haley Barbour to issue Kennard a full pardon. (Bradford had worked with other high school students to collect information that led to the successful 2002 prosecution of murderers of the three civil rights workers in 1964.)

Against the advice of leading Mississippi politicians, academics, and media, Barbour declined to give the pardon, concerned that it was for a deceased person. His spokesman said that Barbour had never pardoned anyone and would not do so for Kennard. He did acknowledge that Kennard was "entitled to have his rights restored." Barbour designated March 30 as Clyde Kennard Day in the state, to attract attention and to commemorate Kennard's "determination, the injustices he suffered, and his significant role in the history of the civil rights movement in Mississippi".

Students from the University of Southern Mississippi had previously joined the campaign to clear Kennard's name and collected more than 1,500 signatures in support of the pardon. They noted that in 2006, USM had more than 2,000 black students. Despite pleas from four former Mississippi governors, on May 10, 2006, the Mississippi State Parole Board refused to recommend a pardon. The Board's vote was split according to racial lines, with all of the white members voting to oppose a pardon recommendation.

Every major newspaper in Mississippi denounced the decisions of the Governor and the Board. Kennard's brother-in-law, Rev. Willie Grant, expressed disappointment over the Board's decision. He said the state appeared to be trying to avoid any potential litigation damages over wrongful imprisonment. The Kennard family had already said publicly that they had no interest in seeking damages.

== Resolution ==
Bradford and the students from Illinois shifted their efforts to using the courts to secure a reversal of the conviction. They contacted Charles Pickering, a former Federal judge, and William Winter, a former Mississippi governor, who fashioned precedent-setting legal strategy.

Using research by Bradford and the students, and the exhaustive legal research prepared by Drizin and Bobby Owens, a Northwestern University law student from Mississippi, Pickering and Winter finally succeeded in clearing Kennard's name. Judge Bob Helfrich accepted a petition from "Barbour, several former judges, a university president and others" to rehear the case. After arguments by Pickering and Winter, heading a blue-ribbon legal team, on May 17, 2006, Helfrich threw out Kennard's original burglary conviction, stating, "To me, this is not a black and white issue; it's a right and wrong issue. To correct that wrong, I am compelled to do the right thing." Barbour said that Helfrich's decision was the "appropriate, constitutional way for this innocent man to be exonerated."

Six days after Helfrich's decree, white supremacist Richard Barrett filed documents to overturn the decision. Barrett was a vocal supporter of Edgar Ray Killen, convicted in federal court in June 2005 of manslaughter in the murders of Chaney, Goodman, and Schwerner in 1964. Barrett's motion was summarily dismissed by Judge Helfrich. His appeal to the Mississippi State Supreme Court was likewise dismissed, ending the legal saga.

== Legacy and honors ==
- In February 1993, the University of Southern Mississippi renamed its campus Student Services Building as Kennard-Washington Hall in honor of Clyde Kennard and Dr. Walter Washington (then president of Alcorn State University, a historically black college).
- On November 14, 2013, the 50th anniversary of Clyde Kennard's death, a commemoration event with a portrait unveiling was held in Washington, D.C.
- On February 2, 2018, the University of Southern Mississippi unveiled a Freedom Trail marker in front of Kennard-Washington Hall commemorating Kennard's life and his role in the civil rights movement.
- On May 11, 2018, Clyde Kennard was awarded a Posthumous Honorary Doctoral degree by the University of Southern Mississippi.
- On May 27, 2021, the Clyde Kennard Memorial Highway was dedicated along U.S. Highway 49 in Hattiesburg, Mississippi.
