= Mississippi Highway 338 =

State Highway in Mississippi

Mississippi Highway 338

Route information
- Maintained by MDOT
- Length: 11.943 mi (19.220 km)
- Existed: 2007–present

Major junctions
- West end: US 278 / MS 6 near Thaxton
- MS 9 in Pontotoc; MS 15 in Pontotoc; MS 9 / MS 41 in Pontotoc
- East end: US 278 / MS 6 near Trace State Park

Location
- Country: United States
- State: Mississippi
- Counties: Pontotoc

Highway system
- Mississippi State Highway System; Interstate; US; State
← MS 336	→ MS 340

Mississippi Highway 338 (MS 338) is a 11.943-mile-long (19.220 km) east-west state Highway in Pontotoc County, Mississippi. It serves as a business loop of U.S. Route 278 (US 278)/MS 6 through the city of Pontotoc.

== Route description ==
MS 338 begins at an intersection with US 278/MS 6 about three miles (4.8 km) southeast of the town of Thaxton. It heads east through farmland for a few miles to enter the city of Pontotoc along West Oxford Street. The highway travels through neighborhoods before becoming concurrent with MS 9 in a business district, with the road continuing past this intersection as Spur Street (unsigned MS 770). MS 9/MS 338 head northeast (still on West Oxford Street) through the business district, having intersections with MS 15 and MS 336 (Turnpike Road), before curving eastward to travel through some neighborhoods on the north side of downtown, where it has an intersection with MS 41 (North Main Street). Here, MS 9 splits off and heads north while MS 338 continues east along East Oxford Street. MS 338 travels through more neighborhoods before leaving Pontotoc and winding its way through hilly woodlands for a couple of miles to come to an end at an interchange with US 278/MS 6 near Trace State Park. The road continues past this interchange as Longview Road.

The entire length of Mississippi Highway 338 is a two-lane state highway located entirely in Pontotoc County.

== History ==
MS 338 was designated and signed in 2007 when US 278/MS 6 was realigned onto the new northern bypass of Pontotoc, the Pontotoc Parkway, which until that time was signed as MS 76 (part of Corridor V of the Appalachian Development Highway System). MS 338 follows the old two-lane alignment of US 278/MS 6 through the city.

== Major intersections ==
The entire route is in Pontotoc County.

Location	mi	km	Destinations	Notes
	0.000	0.000	US 278 / MS 6 – Oxford, Tupelo	Western terminus
Pontotoc	6.423	10.337	MS 9 south – Bruce MS 770 east (Spur Street) to MS 15 south – Houston	Western end of MS 9 concurrency; western terminus of unsigned MS 770
Pontotoc	6.701	10.784	MS 15 – New Albany, Houston, Ecru	
Pontotoc	7.097	11.422	MS 336 west (Turnpike Road) – New Albany, Thaxton	Eastern terminus of MS 336
Pontotoc	7.784	12.527	MS 9 north (North Main Street) – Sherman MS 41 south (North Main Street) – Okolona, Downtown Pontotoc	Eastern end of MS 9 concurrency; northern terminus of MS 41
	11.667– 11.943	18.776– 19.220	US 278 / MS 6 – Oxford, Tupelo; Longview Road	Interchange; eastern terminus; road continues as Longview Road
1.000 mi = 1.609 km; 1.000 km = 0.621 mi: Concurrency terminus

== Original route ==
Mississippi Highway 338
- Location: Western Pontotoc County
- Length: 6.0 mi (9.7 km)
- Existed: 1960–1962

The original routing of MS 338 was a short-lived (between 1960 and 1962) state highway designation for Antioch Road in western Pontotoc County, Mississippi. It ran north–south for 6.0 miles (9.7 km), from MS 9 near Randolph to MS 334 in Toccopola. The entire route (as it still is today) was a narrow two-lane highway.

The entire route was in Pontotoc County.

Location	mi	km	Destinations	Notes
	0.0	0.0	MS 9 – Bruce, Pontotoc	Southern terminus
Toccopola	6.0	9.7	MS 334 – Oxford, Camp Yocona, Pontotoc	Northern terminus
1.000 mi = 1.609 km; 1.000 km = 0.621 mi
