= Mississippi Highway 41 =

Highway in Mississippi

Mississippi Highway 41
- MS 41 highlighted in red

Route information
- Maintained by MDOT
- Length: 31.378 mi (50.498 km)
- Existed: c. 1932–present

Major junctions
- South end: US 45 / US 278 north of Wren
- US 45 Alt. east of Okolona
- North end: MS 9 / MS 338 in Pontotoc

Location
- Country: United States
- State: Mississippi
- Counties: Monroe, Chickasaw, Pontotoc

Highway system
- Mississippi State Highway System; Interstate; US; State
← MS 39	→ MS 42

Mississippi Highway 41 (MS 41) is a state highway in northeastern Mississippi. The route starts at U.S. Route 45 (US 45) and US 278 north of Wren and travels westwards. It then intersects US 45 Alt. east of Okolona. The road enters Okolona, and intersects MS 32 and MS 245. MS 41 then turns northwest and travels toward Pontotoc. Once inside the city, the route turns north at MS 15 and travels through downtown Pontotoc. MS 41 ends at its intersection with MS 9 and MS 338. The route that became MS 41 was first used as an Indian trail. The route was designated by 1932 from Amory to Pontotoc, and it was truncated from Amory to US 45 by 1955. The entirety of MS 41 was paved by 1958.

== Route description ==
Traffic volume on Mississippi Highway 41
Location	Volume
East of US 45 Alt.	3,200
West of South Child Street	7,100
West of MS 245	6,100
North of Banner Street	1,700
Southeast of CR 134	1,200
North of Chickasaw Line Road	1,100
North of Weatherly Lane	2,300
South of Givhan Drive	3,900
South of Washington Street	3,500
North of Marion Street	7,400
Data was measured in 2017 in terms of AADT; Source:

MS 41 is located in Monroe, Chickasaw, and Pontotoc counties. The route is legally defined in Mississippi Code § 65-3-3, and all of it is maintained by the Mississippi Department of Transportation (MDOT), as part of the Mississippi State Highway System.

The route starts at a partial cloverleaf interchange with US 45 and US 278 north of Wren, and travels westward from the interchange. MS 41 intersects McAllister Road and Camargo Road within farmland, before entering a diamond interchange with US 45 Alt. The route enters Chickasaw County past the interchange, at Chickasaw County Road 139 (CR 139). The road enters Okolona west of CR 139, and passes through a residential area within the city as East Monroe Avenue. West of South Child Street, MS 41 crosses over a railroad operated by Kansas City Southern Railway and becomes West Monroe Avenue. The route continues westward and intersects MS 32 and MS 245 at the center of the city. West of the intersection, MS 32 and MS 41 are concurrent for two city blocks. At McDonnell Street, MS 41 turns north and ends the concurrency with MS 32. The road turns northwestwards at Main Street, and it leaves the city limits past Academy Street. The route continues traveling through farmland, intersecting CR 137 and smaller driveways. Southeast of CR 243, MS 41 enters the northeastern edge of the Tombigbee National Forest. On the forest boundary, the road enters Pontotoc County at Chickasaw Line Road.

Inside Pontotoc County, the road intersects the Natchez Trace Parkway at a quadrant roadway intersection on the northern end of the Tombigbee National Forest. MS 41 continues northwestwards and intersects CR 97 in Troy, which leads to Woodland. The route then meets CR 115, a road that ends at Chiwapa. Between CR 113, the road crosses Garrett Creek and Chiwapa Creek, and Calloway Creek north of CR 134. MS 41 then intersects the western terminus of MS 342 near Webster Creek. The route enters the city of Pontotoc east of Country Village Lane, and it turns north at MS 15. Past Tenth Street, the road crosses over the Mile Branch. As South Main Street, MS 41 enters downtown Pontotoc and intersects multiple city streets, the majority within the Pontotoc Historic District. The road becomes North Main Street at Reynolds Street, and it passes by schools that are part of the Pontotoc City School District, including Pontotoc High School. MS 41 ends at MS 9 and MS 338 at Oxford Street, and the road continues as MS 9.

== History ==
The road that became part of MS 41 first existed as an Indian trail, later used by both belligerents in the Civil War. By 1928, it was a gravel road from Amory to Pontotoc. Part of it was designated as MS 41 by 1932, from Okolona to Pontotoc. The remaining part of the road was added to the route by 1935. Around 1936, the section of MS 41 from Okolona to US 45 was rerouted southwards, creating a one mile (1.6 km) concurrency at US 45. The route from Amory to US 45 was paved by 1940, and a small part east of Okolona by 1945. By 1955, MS 41 was paved from Okolona to US 45. US 278 was designated during that time, and it replaced MS 41 east of US 45. One year later, half of MS 41 in Pontotoc County was paved, and the remaining parts of the route were paved by 1958. The eastern terminus at US 45 was also rerouted northwards to the US 45's intersection with US 278. By 1962, the Natchez Trace Parkway was connected to MS 41. Interchanges were added at US 45 and US 45 Alt. by 1999 and 2000 respectively.

== Major intersections ==
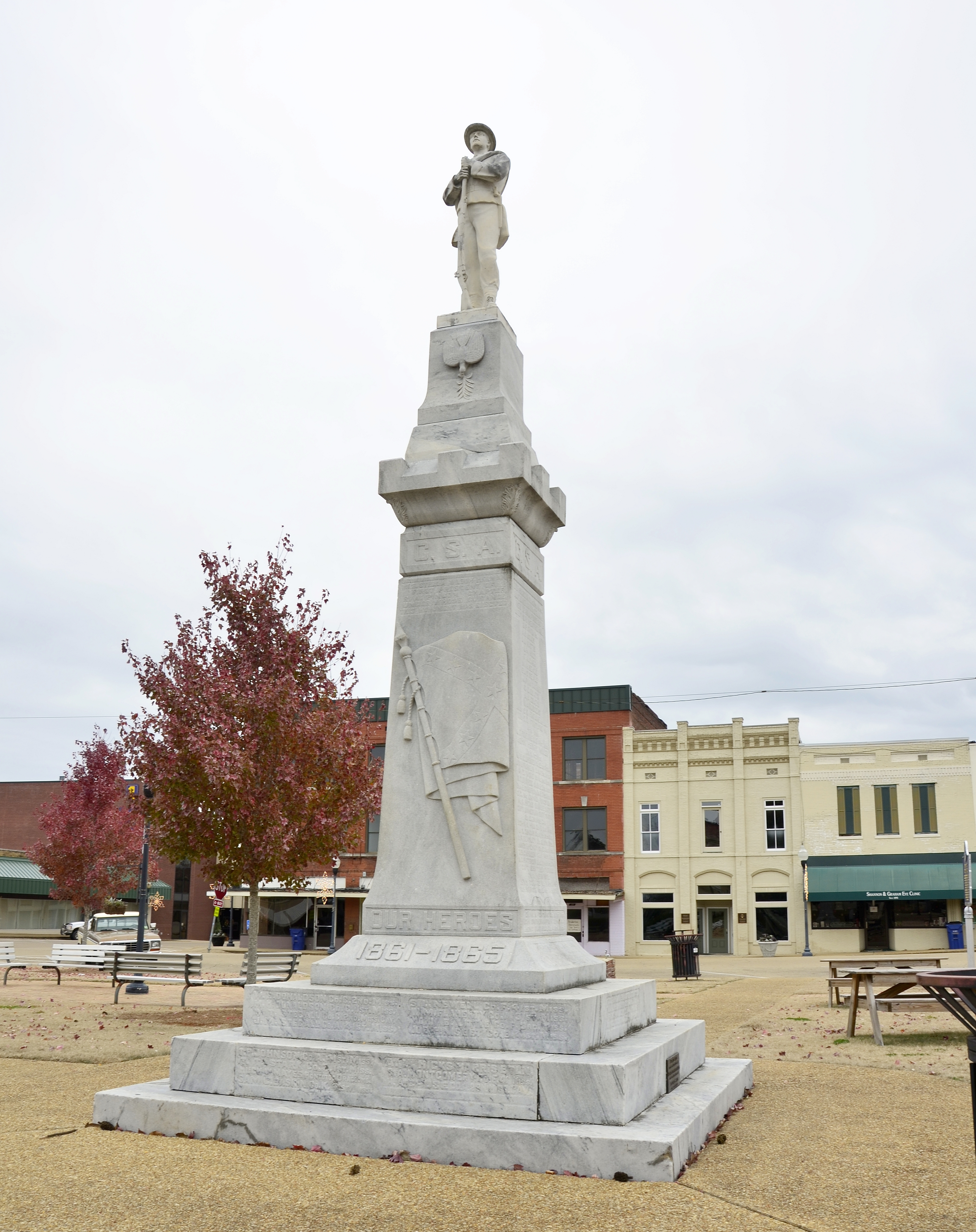
A Confederate monument located on MS 41 in Pontotoc

County	Location	mi	km	Destinations	Notes
Monroe		0.0– 0.3	0.0– 0.48	US 45 / US 278 – Aberdeen, Tupelo, Amory	Southern terminus; Partial cloverleaf interchange
Monroe		4.3– 4.6	6.9– 7.4	US 45 Alt. – West Point, Tupelo	Diamond interchange
Chickasaw	Okolona	7.5	12.1	MS 245 (Church Street) – Shannon	
Chickasaw	Okolona	7.5	12.1	MS 32 (West Monroe Avenue) – New Houlka, Van Vleet	Southern end of MS 32 concurrency; eastern terminus of MS 32
Chickasaw	Okolona	7.8	12.6	MS 32 (West Monroe Avenue) – New Houlka, Van Vleet	Northern end of MS 32 concurrency
Pontotoc		16.7	26.9	Natchez Trace Parkway	Quadrant roadway intersection
Pontotoc		28.2	45.4	MS 342 east (Black Zion Road) – Black Zion	Western terminus of MS 342
Pontotoc	Pontotoc	29.6	47.6	MS 15 – New Albany, Houston	
Pontotoc	Pontotoc	31.6	50.9	MS 9 / MS 338 (Oxford Street/Main Street) – Houston, Sherman	Northern terminus
1.000 mi = 1.609 km; 1.000 km = 0.621 mi: Concurrency terminus
