= Mississippi Highway 6 =

Highway in Mississippi

Mississippi Highway 6

Route information
- Maintained by MDOT
- Length: 138.8 mi (223.4 km) (25.295 mi excluding concurrencies)
- Existed: 1932–present

Major junctions
- West end: MS 161 in Clarksdale
- Future I-69 / US 49 / US 61 / US 278 in Clarksdale; US 51 in Batesville; I-55 in Batesville; US 45 / US 278 in Tupelo
- East end: MS 25 in Amory

Location
- Country: United States
- State: Mississippi
- Counties: Coahoma, Quitman, Panola, Lafayette, Pontotoc, Lee, Monroe

Highway system
- Mississippi State Highway System; Interstate; US; State
← MS 5	→ MS 7

Mississippi Highway 6 (MS 6) runs east–west from MS 161 in Lyon, east to MS 25 near Amory. It travels approximately 139 miles (224 km), serving Coahoma, Quitman, Panola, Lafayette, Pontotoc, Lee, and Monroe Counties. West of Tupelo, it is concurrent with US 278. Points of interest along the route include the University of Mississippi, Trace State Park, Natchez Trace Parkway, the Elvis Presley Birthplace, and Tombigbee State Park.

== Route description ==
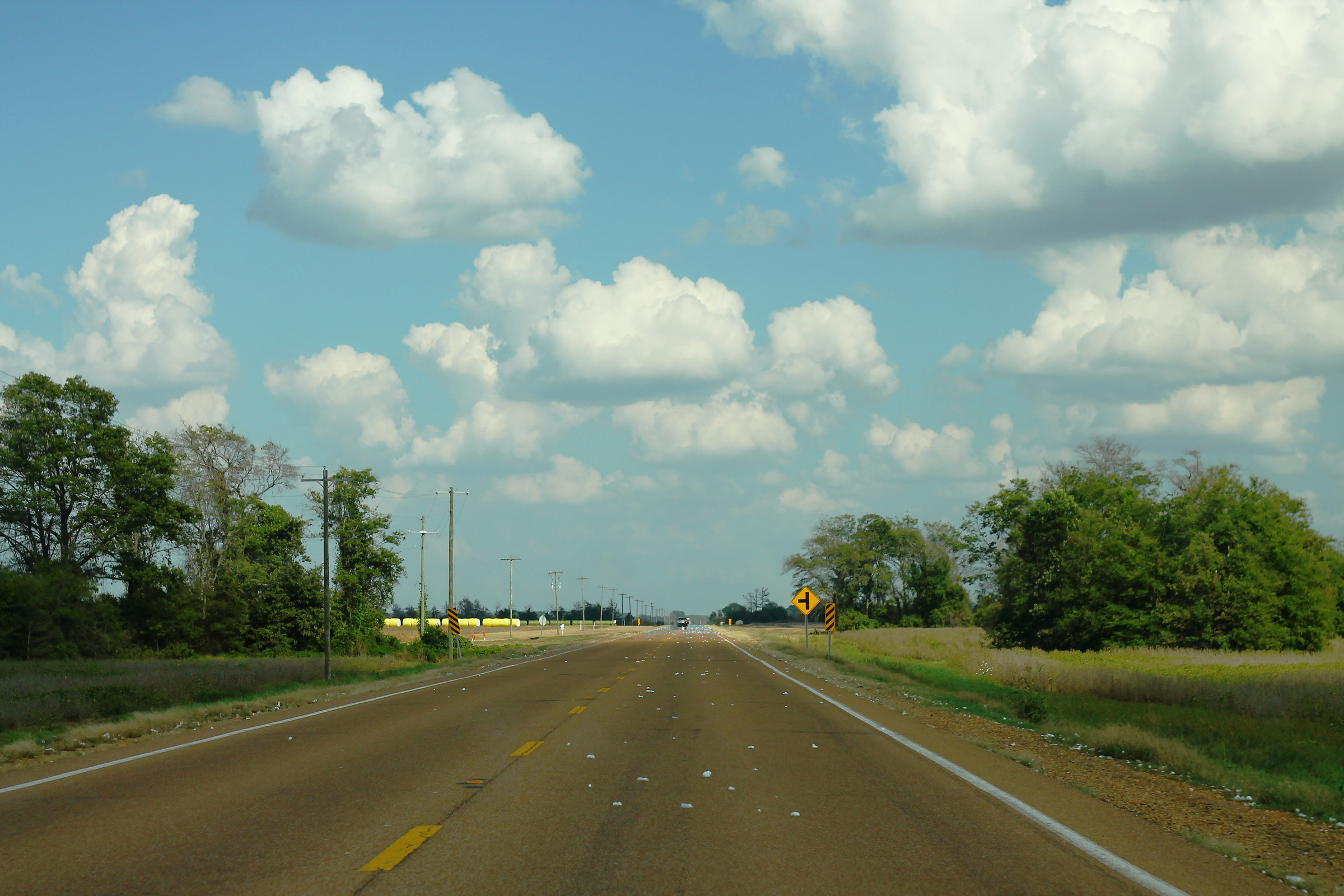
A stretch of Mississippi Highway 6/U.S. Highway 278 in the Mississippi Delta

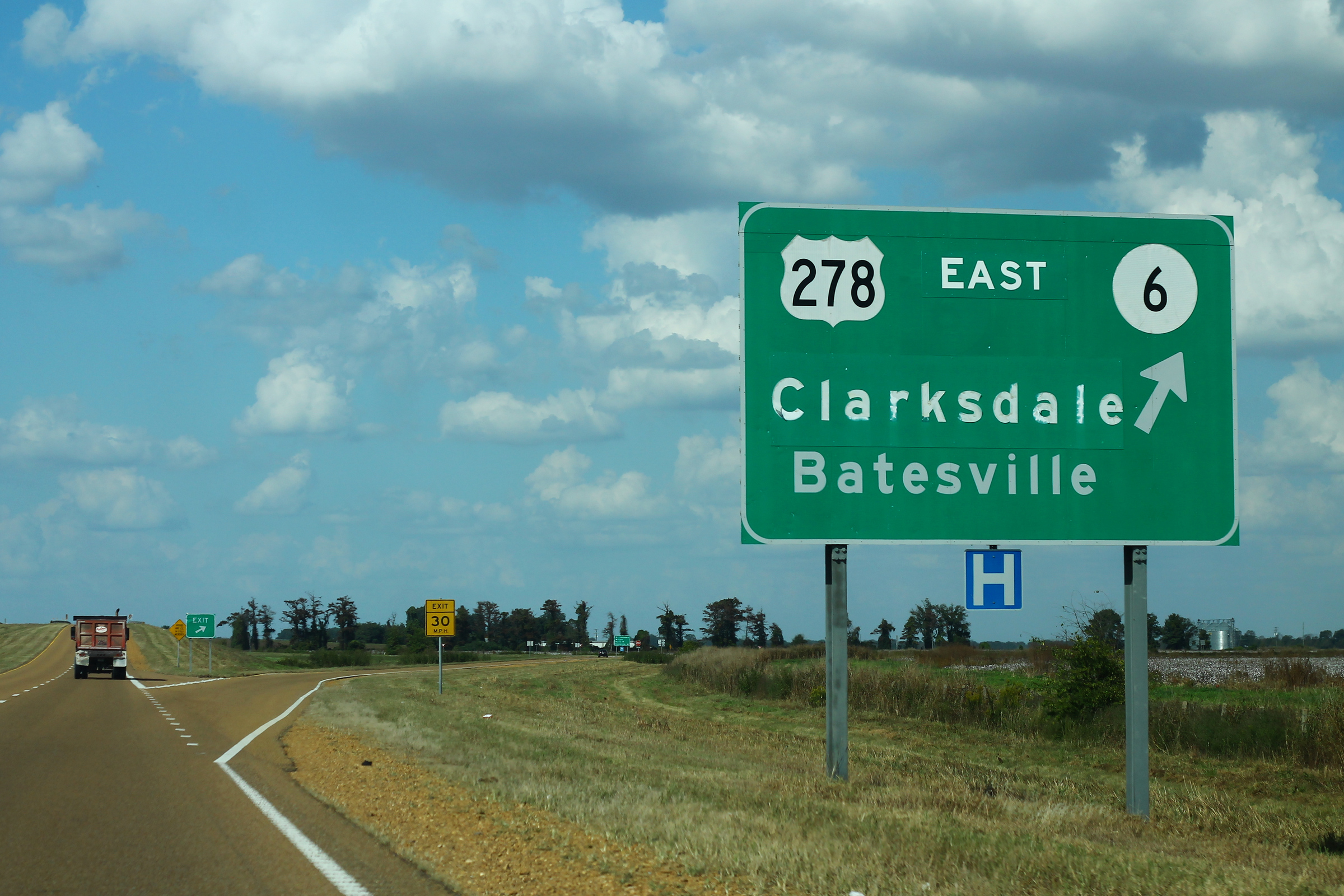
US 49/US 61 (Future I-69) northbound at their interchange with MS 6/US 278 in Clarksdale

MS 6 begins in the Mississippi Delta region in Coahoma County at an intersection with MS 161 near the Clarksdale-Lyon city line. It heads east as a two-lane highway for not even a mile to an interchange with US 49/US 61, where it becomes concurrent with US 278. MS 6/US 278 now leave the Clarksdale area and pass through farmland for several miles, where it crosses the same bayou three times, before entering Quitman County.

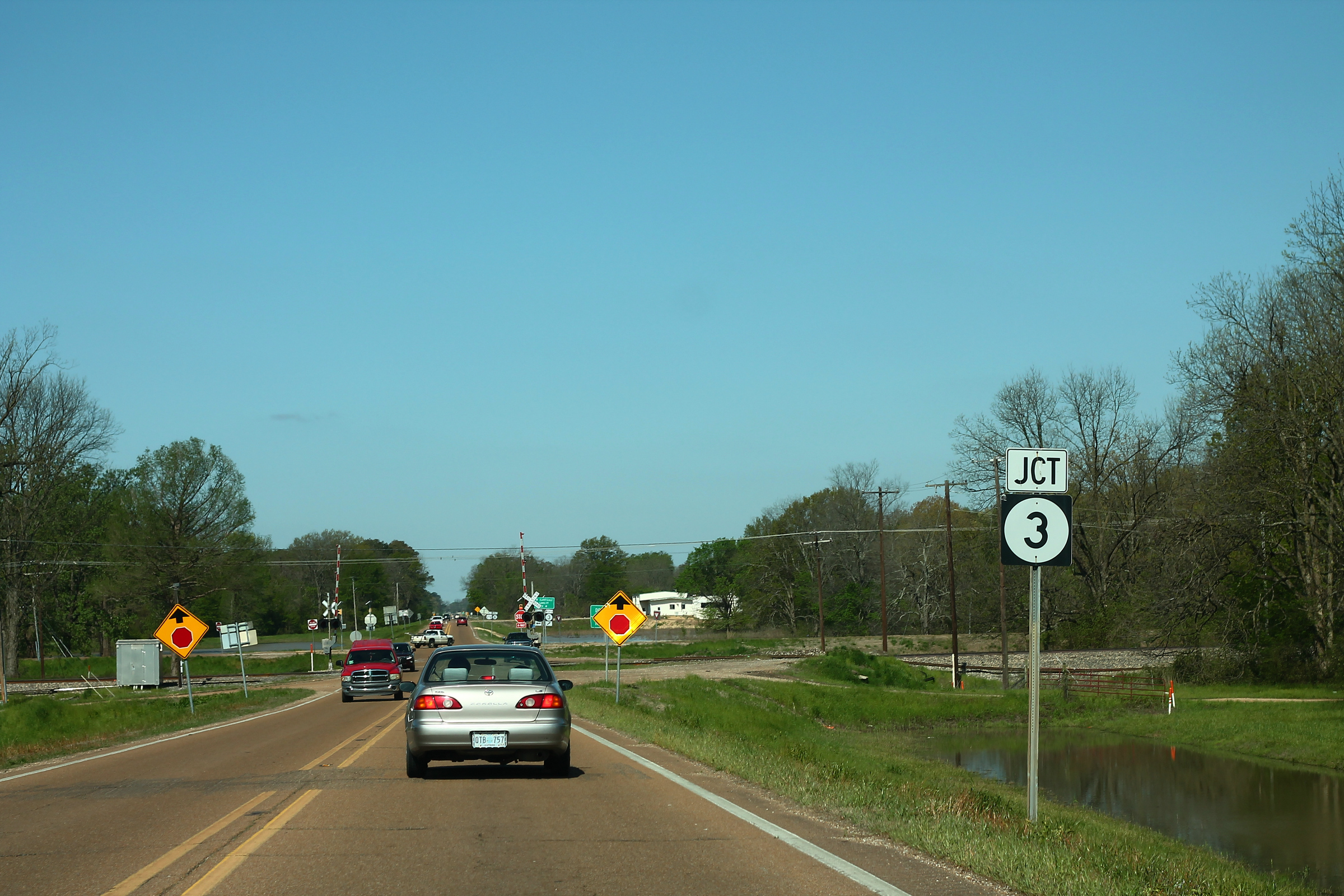
MS 6/US 278 at their intersection with MS 3 in Marks

MS 6/US 278 pass through Barksdale before having an intersection with MS 316 at West Marks and entering the town of Marks shortly thereafter. It mostly bypasses the town along its northern outskirts, where it has an intersection with MS 3 and crosses the Coldwater River. The highway now enters Panola County, after passing through Bobo and crossing the Peach Creek.

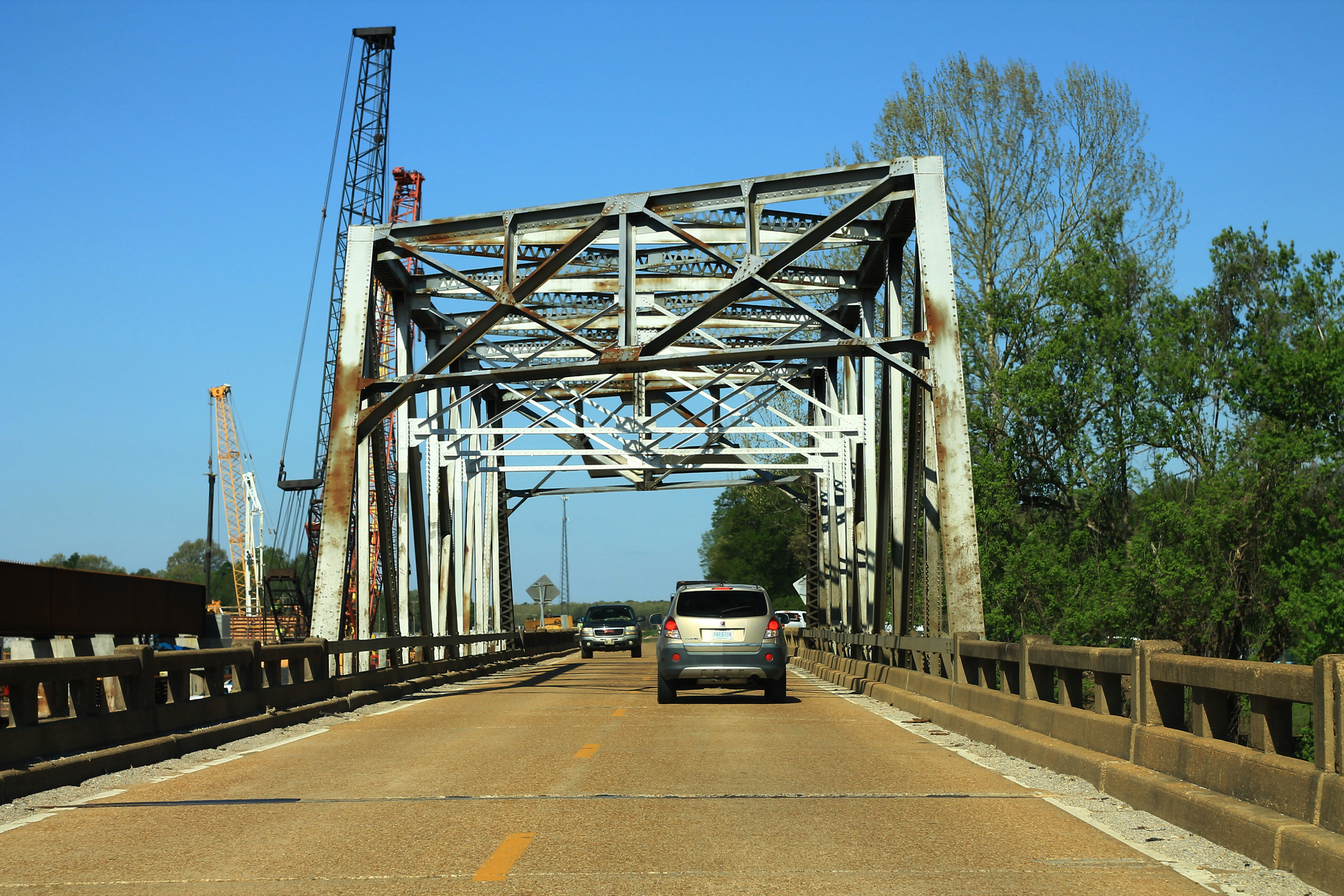
MS 6/US 278's former bridge over bridge over the Tallahatchie River. It has since been replaced with a new span.

MS 6/US 278 pass through Locke Station before crossing the Tallahatchie River and entering Batesville shortly thereafter. The highway passes through some neighborhoods and business districts as it bypasses downtown along its southern side and has a concurrency with MS 35. It widens to a four-lane undivided highway at an intersection with US 51, where MS 35 splits off, before passing through a major business district to come to an interchange with I-55 (Exit 243). MS 6/US 278 now widen to a divided highway as it leaves Batesville and enters the North Central Hills region. The highway now has an interchange and concurrency with MS 315, which splits off unsigned onto Black Jack Road, providing access to Sardis Lake and John W. Kyle State Park. MS 6/US 278 now cross into Lafayette County.

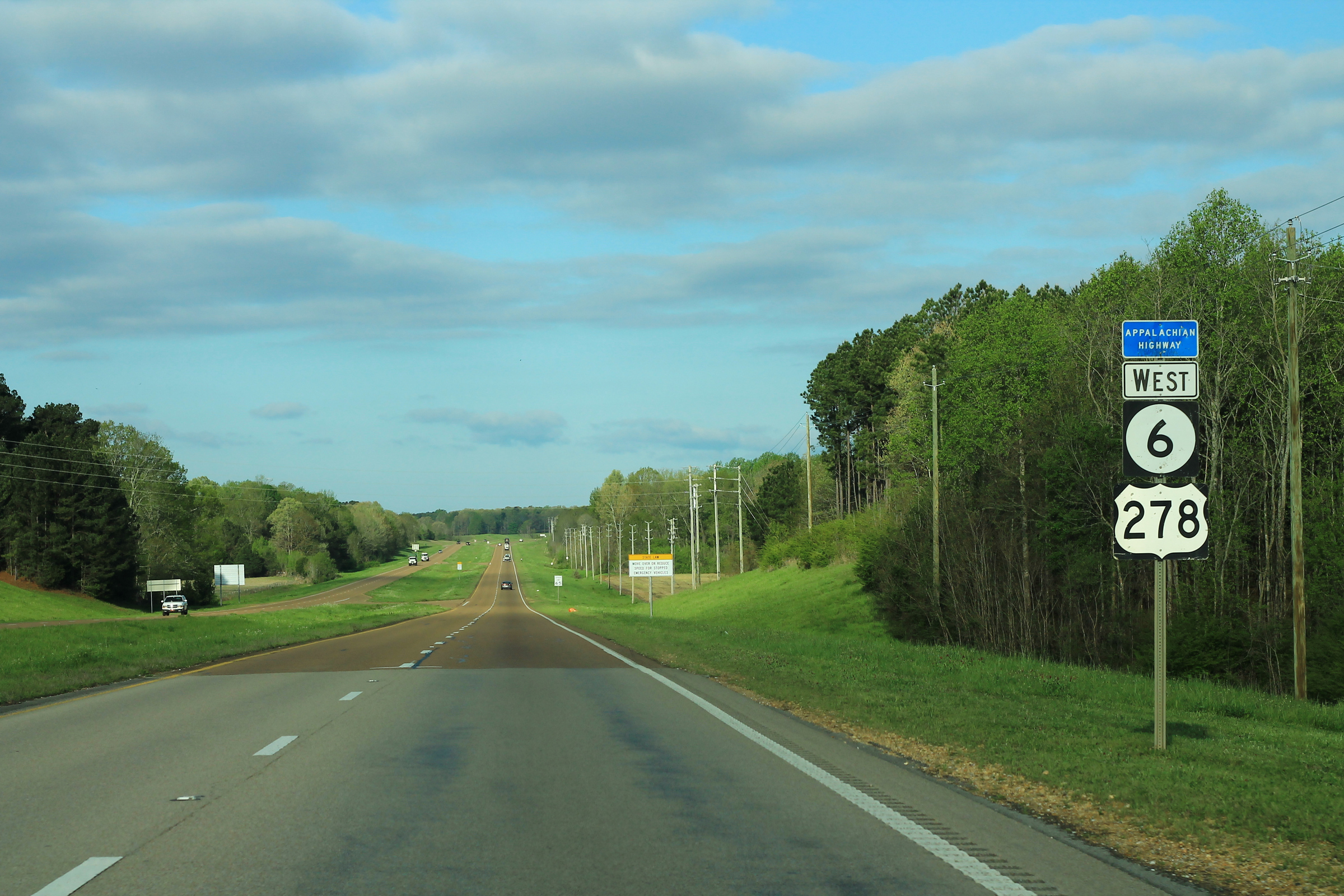
MS 6/US 278 eastbound near Oxford

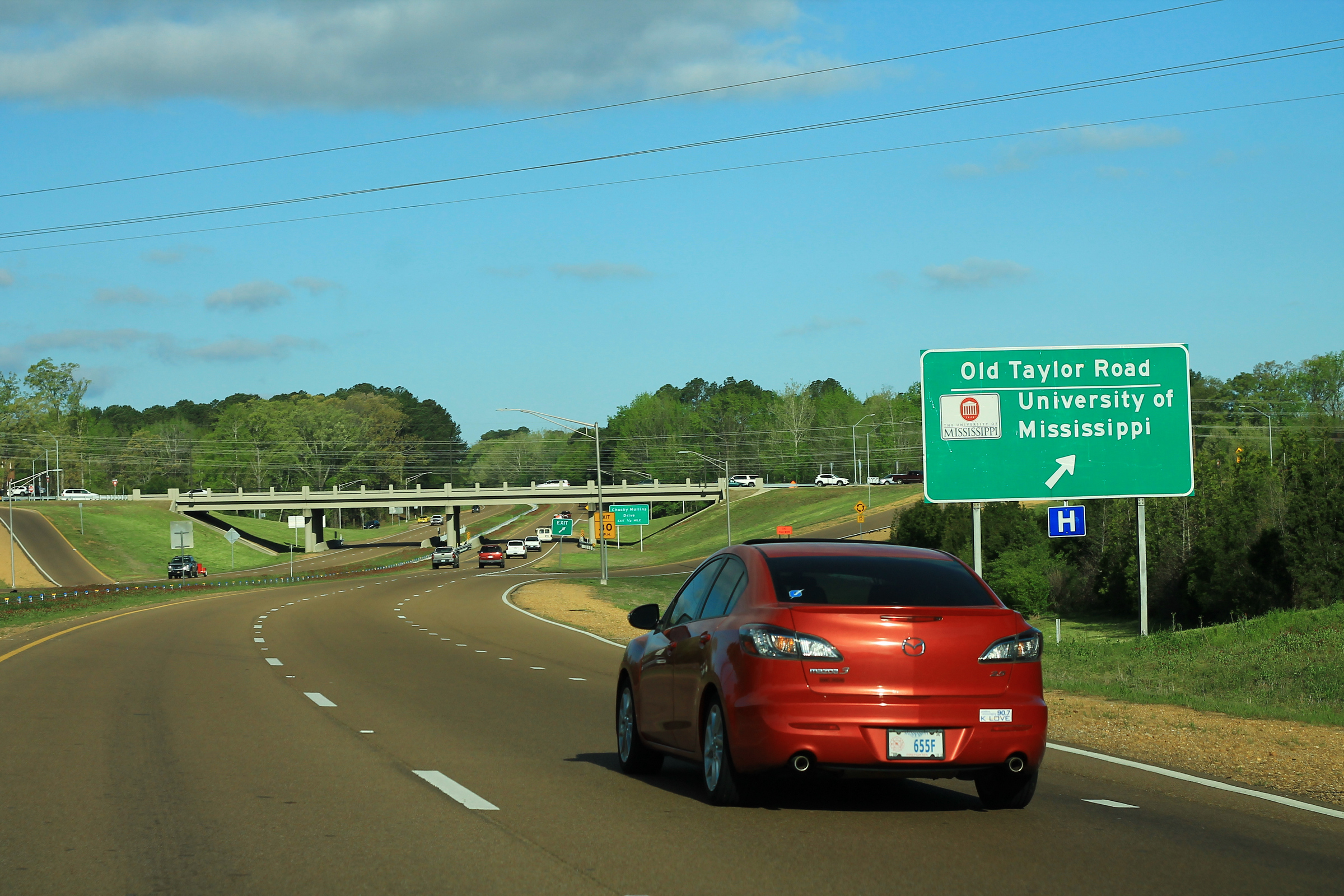
MS 6/US 278 westbound in Oxford

MS 6/US 278 now enter Oxford and bypass that city along a southern freeway bypass, where it passes by the main campus of the University of Mississippi (Ole Miss), as well as having interchanges with MS 7 and MS 334. It has an at-grade intersection with University Avenue (unsigned MS 738) before leaving Oxford. The highway now passes through Lafayette Springs, where it has an intersection with a county road connecting to MS 336 (Lafayette Springs Road/CR 251), before crossing into Pontotoc County.

MS 334 represents the former alignment of MS 6 between Oxford and Pontotoc.

MS 6/US 278 now pass through Thaxton before having an intersection with MS 338, and a short concurrency with MS 336, to enter Pontotoc. It bypasses the city along its northern edge as an expressway, with an interchange at MS 15, at-grade intersection at MS 345, and interchanges with MS 9 and MS 338. MS 6/US 278 pass by Trace State Park before crossing into Lee County.

MS 338 represents the former alignment of MS 6 through downtown Pontotoc.

MS 6/US 278 continue through farmland as an expressway to have an interchange with the Natchez Trace Parkway before entering Tupelo, traveling along the southern city limits to have interchanges with small city streets, as well as having an intersection with MS 145 and an interchange with US 45 along the city line with Verona. At this interchange, MS 6 splits off from US 278 and heads north along the US 45 freeway through the eastern side of the city of Tupelo for several miles. They come to the eastern edge of downtown, where MS 6 splits from US 45 at an interchange and heads east along MS 178 (E Main Street). They immediately cross Town Creek before entering some neighborhoods as a four-lane undivided highway, where MS 6 splits off and heads south along its own path near the Elvis Presley Birthplace. MS 6 now leaves Tupelo as a two-lane (Briar Ridge Road) and heads south through Plantersville, where MS 6 has an intersection with State Park Road, which leads to Tombigbee State Park. The highway winds its way southeast to Nettleton, where MS 6 crosses into Monroe County at the center of downtown at an intersection with Main Street (unsigned MS 774).

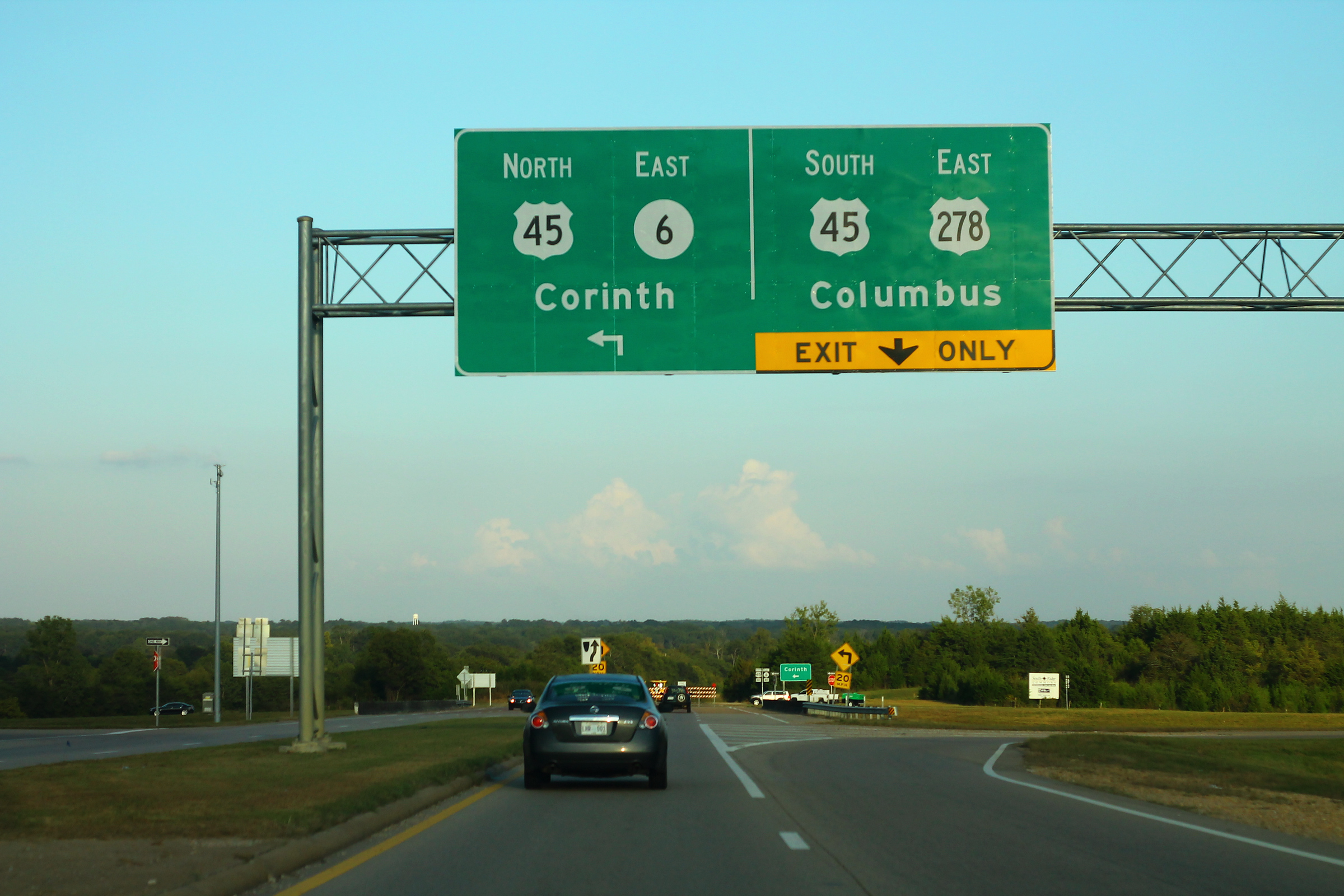
MS 6/US 278 at their interchange with US 45 in Tupelo

MS 6 turns left along Main Street to leave Nettleton and head southeast through wooded areas (as it enters the Appalachian Mountains foothills) for several miles, where it has intersections with Old Highway 6 (unsigned MS 776) and MS 371, to pass through Bigbee. The highway now crosses the Tennessee Tombigbee Waterway (Tombigbee River) into Amory, with MS 6 coming to an end at the northern edge of downtown at an intersection with MS 25 (Main Street).

== History ==
The entire route, from 1997 and prior, was signed solely as MS 6. In early 1998, US 278 was extended from Tupelo, across northern Mississippi, to Arkansas, with the majority of the route being placed along MS 6. US 278 went unsigned for many years, well into the 2000s, and when it finally was signed, MS 6 signs were never removed.

The entire route of MS 6/US 278 between Batesville and Tupelo has been upgraded to a four-lane divided highway as part of Corridor V of the Appalachian Development Highway System.

MS 6 previously continued east of Amory, through the town of Hatley, the communities of Wise Gap (where it had an intersection with MS 8) and Greenwood Springs, to the Alabama state line at the village of Gattman. This section of MS 6 was decommissioned when US 278 was originally commissioned through the area in 1951 (signed 1952).

=== Controversy over parking on the highway shoulder ===
On September 4, 2004, a 19-year-old University of Mississippi student named Dustin Dill from Orlando, Florida struck and killed a fellow student, 23-year-old pharmacy major and Oxford native Amie Ewing, on this highway. Dill had a 0.12 percent blood-alcohol level when his Honda Accord struck Ewing and sent her into a parked Oldsmobile Achieva. Ewing had parked along the shoulder of Highway 6, then walked to Vaught–Hemingway Stadium to watch the Ole Miss Rebels football team play the University of Memphis Tigers and was killed when she crossed the westbound lane of the highway approximately 1,000 feet (300 m) east of Old Taylor Road while returning to her car.

Mississippi state and Oxford city laws prohibit the use of state highway shoulders as parking lots; however, this law went unenforced in Oxford on Saturdays when the Rebels played home games. Since this event, the 'no parking' laws along this highway have been enforced. This highway is now also known as "Amie Ewing Memorial Highway".

== Major intersections ==
County	Location	mi	km	Destinations	Notes
Coahoma	Clarksdale	0.0	0.0	MS 161 – Clarksdale, Lyon	Western terminus
Coahoma	Clarksdale	0.5– 0.7	0.80– 1.1	Future I-69 / US 49 / US 61 / US 278 west – Memphis, Greenwood	Interchange; west end of US 278 overlap
Quitman		13.6	21.9	MS 316 west – Belen, Jonestown	Eastern terminus of MS 316
Quitman	Marks	15.9	25.6	MS 3 – Sledge, Lambert	
Panola	Batesville	34.4	55.4	MS 35 south – Charleston	West end of MS 35 overlap
Panola	Batesville	35.1	56.5	MS 725 north (Eureka Street) – Downtown Batesville	Southern terminus of MS 725
Panola	Batesville	35.5	57.1	US 51 / MS 35 north – Sardis Dam	East end of MS 35 overlap
Panola	Batesville	36.7– 37.1	59.1– 59.7	I-55 – Memphis, Grenada	I-55 exit 243
Panola		44.3– 44.8	71.3– 72.1	MS 315 south – Water Valley	Interchange; western end of unsigned MS 315 overlap
Panola		47.2	76.0	Black Jack Road (MS 315 north) / Shady Grove Road - Coles Point, Shady Grove, John W. Kyle State Park	Eastern end of unsigned MS 315 overlap
Lafayette	Oxford	57.5	92.5	West Jackson Avenue - West Oxford, Clear Creek Recreation Area	Former MS 6 east; at-grade intersection; west end of freeway
Lafayette	Oxford	59.0– 59.2	95.0– 95.3	Chucky Mullins Drive	Former Coliseum Drive
Lafayette	Oxford	59.6– 59.9	95.9– 96.4	Old Taylor Road - University of Mississippi	
Lafayette	Oxford	60.3– 60.6	97.0– 97.5	Lamar Boulevard - Downtown Oxford	
Lafayette	Oxford	61.0– 61.3	98.2– 98.7	MS 7 – Holly Springs, Water Valley, Bruce, New Albany	
Lafayette		61.8– 62.1	99.5– 99.9	MS 334 – East Oxford	
Lafayette		62.4	100.4	University Avenue (MS 738 west)	Former MS 6 west; at-grade intersection; eastern terminus of unsigned MS 738; east end of freeway
Lafayette		75.8	122.0	CR 251 / CR 431 – Lafayette Springs	Proposed MS 336 east
Pontotoc		83.9	135.0	MS 338 east (Veterans Highway West) – West Pontotoc	Western terminus of MS 338; former MS 6/US 278 east
Pontotoc		85.1	137.0	MS 336 west – Thaxton	West end of MS 336 overlap
Pontotoc		85.4	137.4	MS 336 east	East end of MS 336 overlap
Pontotoc	Pontotoc	89.4– 90.0	143.9– 144.8	MS 15 – Pontotoc, New Albany	Interchange
Pontotoc		91.5	147.3	MS 345 – Ecru, Pontotoc, Town Square Museum	
Pontotoc		92.6– 93.3	149.0– 150.2	MS 9 – Sherman, Pontotoc	Interchange
Pontotoc		95.9– 96.5	154.3– 155.3	MS 338 – Longview, East Pontotoc	Interchange; former MS 6/US 278 west
Pontotoc		98.3	158.2	Trace State Park	Interchange; eastbound exit and westbound entrance; former MS 6/US 278 east
Pontotoc		99.8	160.6	MS 342 – Black Zion	Westbound entry to Trace State Park
Lee		105.7	170.1	Bissell Road	Interchange
Lee		106.1	170.8	Natchez Trace Parkway	Interchange
Lee		106.9– 107.3	172.0– 172.7	Graham Drive	Interchange
Lee	Tupelo	109.5	176.2	MS 145 (South Gloster Street)	
Lee	Tupelo	110.1– 110.3	177.2– 177.5	US 45 south / US 278 east – Columbus	Interchange; west end of freeway; east end of US 278 overlap; west end of US 45 overlap
Lee	Tupelo	111.9– 112.5	180.1– 181.1	Eason Boulevard	
Lee	Tupelo	113.4	182.5	US 45 north / MS 178 west / Main Street – Corinth, Downtown Tupelo	Interchange; east end of freeway; east end of US 45 overlap; west end of MS 178 overlap; former MS 6/US 278 west
Lee	Tupelo	114.3	183.9	To US 78 / Veterans Memorial Boulevard – Elvis Presley Birth Place and Lake	
Lee	Tupelo	114.5	184.3	MS 178 east (East Main Street) – Fulton	East end of MS 178 overlap
Lee	Tupelo	116.2	187.0	Eason Boulevard - alternate truck route to MS 6 west / US 45	
Lee	Plantersville	117.6	189.3	State Park Road - Tombigbee State Park	Access road into park
Lee–Monroe county line	Nettleton	128.1	206.2	To Main Street (MS 774 west) / MS 145	Eastern terminus of unsigned MS 774
Monroe		132.3	212.9	Old Highway 6 (MS 776 east)	Western terminus of unsigned MS 776
Monroe	Bigbee	136.4	219.5	MS 371 north – Mooreville	Southern terminus of MS 371
Monroe	Amory	138.8	223.4	MS 25 – Smithville, Fulton, Amory	Eastern terminus
1.000 mi = 1.609 km; 1.000 km = 0.621 mi: Concurrency terminus; Incomplete access
