= Mississippi Highway 336 =

Highway in Mississippi

Mississippi Highway 336

Route information
- Maintained by MDOT
- Length: 15.778 mi (25.392 km)
- Existed: 1958–present

Major junctions
- West end: CR 251 (Lafayette Springs Road) in Lafayette Springs
- US 278 / MS 6 near Thaxton; MS 15 in Pontotoc
- East end: MS 9 / MS 338 in Pontotoc

Location
- Country: United States
- State: Mississippi
- Counties: Lafayette, Pontotoc

Highway system
- Mississippi State Highway System; Interstate; US; State
← MS 335	→ MS 338

Mississippi Highway 336 (MS 336) is a 15.778-mile-long (25.392 km) west–east state highway in the North Central Hills region of northern Mississippi, connecting Lafayette Springs, through Thaxton, to Pontotoc. It is generally a narrow two-lane route.

== Route description ==
MS 336 begins in Lafayette County at an intersection with Lafayette County Road 251 (CR 251 / Lafayette Springs Road) in the small community of Lafayette Springs, just a little over one mile (1.6 km) north of MS 6/U.S. Route 278 (US 278). Within Lafayette County, it is county-maintained as County Route 272 (CR 272). It heads east to leave Lafayette Springs and travel through some woodlands, crossing into Pontotoc County where state maintenance begins. The highway has an intersection with Hurricane Road (a county maintained eastern extension of MS 346) before winding its way through hilly woodlands for the next several miles to pass through the town of Thaxton. MS 336 then has an extremely short 1,700-foot-long (520 m) concurrency with US 278/MS 6 before entering Pontotoc along Turnpike Road. The highway travels through a neighborhood before passing through a major business district, where it has an intersection with MS 15, before coming to an end shortly thereafter at an intersection MS 9/MS 338 (West Oxford Street) on the north side of downtown.

The entire length of Mississippi Highway 336 is a two-lane state highway.

== Major intersections ==
County	Location	mi	km	Destinations	Notes
Lafayette	Lafayette Springs	0.000	0.000	CR 251 (Lafayette Springs Road) to US 278 / MS 6	Western terminus
Pontotoc		0.596	0.959	Hurricane Road to MS 346	
Pontotoc		9.941	15.998	US 278 / MS 6 – New Albany, Pontotoc, Oxford	Short 1700 feet concurrency with US 278 / MS 6
Pontotoc	Pontotoc	14.285– 14.389	22.989– 23.157	MS 15 – New Albany, Houston	
Pontotoc	Pontotoc	15.778	25.392	MS 9 / MS 338 (W Oxford Street) – Tupelo, Bruce, Sherman	Eastern terminus
1.000 mi = 1.609 km; 1.000 km = 0.621 mi
