= Mississippi Highway 345 =

Highway in Mississippi

Mississippi Highway 345

Route information
- Maintained by MDOT
- Length: 9.272 mi (14.922 km)
- Existed: 1958–present

Major junctions
- South end: MS 9 in Pontotoc
- US 278 / MS 6 in Pontotoc
- North end: MS 15 in Ecru

Location
- Country: United States
- State: Mississippi
- Counties: Pontotoc

Highway system
- Mississippi State Highway System; Interstate; US; State
← MS 342	→ MS 346

Mississippi Highway 345 (MS 345) is a 9.272-mile-long (14.922 km) north–south state highway in Pontotoc County, Mississippi, connecting the city of Pontotoc with the town of Ecru.

== Route description ==
MS 345 begins in the city of Pontotoc at an intersection with MS 9 (North Main Street) at the northern edge of downtown. It heads north, along North Main Street, through neighborhoods for two miles (3.2 km) to an intersection with U.S. Route 278 (US 278)/MS 6 (Pontotoc Parkway), where it leaves Pontotoc. The highway winds its way through a mix of farmland and wooded hills for the next several miles, where it crosses Cherry Creek (one of two creeks forming the Little Tallahatchie River) before passing through the community of Cherry Creek, where it makes a sharp left turn. MS 345 now enters the town of Ecru along Main Street and passes through neighborhoods, then straight through downtown before coming to an end at an intersection with MS 15.

The entire length of Mississippi Highway 345 is a two-lane highway, lying entirely in Pontotoc County.

== Major intersections ==
The entire route is in Pontotoc County.

Location	mi	km	Destinations	Notes
Pontotoc	0.000	0.000	MS 9 (North Main Street) – Pontotoc, Sherman	Southern terminus
	2.237	3.600	US 278 / MS 6 (Pontotoc Parkway) to MS 9 – Oxford	
Ecru	9.272	14.922	MS 15 – New Albany, Pontotoc	Northern terminus
1.000 mi = 1.609 km; 1.000 km = 0.621 mi
