= Mississippi Highway 342 =

Highway in Mississippi

Mississippi Highway 342
- Black Zion Road

Route information
- Maintained by MDOT
- Length: 7.793 mi (12.542 km)
- Existed: 1956–present

Major junctions
- West end: MS 41 near Pontotoc
- US 278 / MS 6 near Pontotoc
- East end: West Main Street near Trace State Park

Location
- Country: United States
- State: Mississippi
- Counties: Pontotoc

Highway system
- Mississippi State Highway System; Interstate; US; State
← MS 341	→ MS 345

Mississippi Highway 342 (MS 342), also known as Black Zion Road, is a 7.793-mile-long (12.542 km) west–east state highway in eastern Pontotoc County, Mississippi, connecting MS 41 near Pontotoc to West Main Street east of Pontotoc. It is generally a narrow two-lane route.

== Route description ==
MS 342 begins at an intersection with MS 41 just southeast of the Pontotoc city limits. It winds its way east up the Chiwapa Creek valley (on the creek's northern banks) for about six miles (9.7 km) to make a sharp left turn at an intersection with Valley Road at the community of Zion (also known as Black Zion). The highway heads north for about one mile (1.6 km) before coming to an intersection with U.S. Route 278 (US 278)/MS 6 just outside of Trace State Park. The road continues for another 0.65 miles (1.05 km) to end at West Main Street and Faulkner Road.

The entire length of Mississippi Highway 342 is a rural, two-lane, state highway.

== Major intersections ==
The entire route is in Pontotoc County.

Location	mi	km	Destinations	Notes
	0.000	0.000	MS 41	Western terminus
	7.144	11.497	US 278 / MS 6 (Pontotoc Parkway) – Pontotoc, Tupelo	
	7.793	12.542	West Main Street / Faulkner Road – Trace State Park	Eastern terminus
1.000 mi = 1.609 km; 1.000 km = 0.621 mi
