= Cherry Creek, Mississippi =

Unincorporated community in Mississippi, US

- Unincorporated community
- Location within Mississippi Location within the United States
- Coordinates: 34°21′02″N 88°59′15″W
- Country: United States
- State: Mississippi
- County: Pontotoc
- Elevation: 433 ft (132 m)
- Time zone: UTC-6 (Central (CST))
  - Summer (DST): UTC-5 (CDT)
- GNIS feature ID: 668366

Cherry Creek is an unincorporated community in Pontotoc County, Mississippi.

Cherry Creek is located east of Ecru and north of Pontotoc on Mississippi Highway 345.

Cherry Creek was founded in the 1840s by settlers from South Carolina.

A post office operated under the name Cherry Creek from 1851 to 1904.

Cherry Creek Baptist Church, which is one of the oldest churches in the area, was founded in May 1843.
