= National Register of Historic Places listings in Pontotoc County, Mississippi =

Location of Pontotoc County in Mississippi

This is a list of the National Register of Historic Places listings in Pontotoc County, Mississippi.

This is intended to be a complete list of the properties and districts on the National Register of Historic Places in Pontotoc County, Mississippi, United States. Latitude and longitude coordinates are provided for many National Register properties and districts; these locations may be seen together in a map.

There are 3 properties and districts listed on the National Register in the county.

This National Park Service list is complete through NPS recent listings posted October 23, 2026.

== Current listings ==
	Name on the Register	Image	Date listed	Location	City or town	Description
1	Lochinvar	Lochinvar	March 13, 1986 (#86000331)	Mississippi Highway 15 south of Pontotoc; 34°12′56″N 89°00′22″W	Pontotoc	A plantation
2	Pontotoc Historic District	Pontotoc Historic District	October 29, 1993 (#93001164)	Roughly, along Main and Liberty Sts. between Reynolds and 8th Sts. 34°14′44″N 88°59′53″W	Pontotoc	
3	Treaty of Pontotoc Site	Treaty of Pontotoc Site	July 27, 1973 (#73001025)	Address restricted	Pontotoc	

== See also ==
- List of National Historic Landmarks in Mississippi
- National Register of Historic Places listings in Mississippi
