= Rough Edge =

Rough Edge(s) may refer to:

- Rough Edge, Mississippi, an unincorporated community in Pontotoc County, Mississippi
- Rough Edges (album), a 1970 album by Ben E. King
- "Rough Edges" (Big Love), an episode of the American TV series Big Love
