= Pontotoc County School District =

School district in Mississippi

Coordinates: 34.235577°N 89.012452°W

The Pontotoc County School District is a public school district based in Pontotoc County, Mississippi (USA). The district serves the towns of: Algoma, Ecru, Thaxton, Toccopola, most of Sherman (the Pontotoc County portion), the communities of Randolph, and Springville, and most rural areas in Pontotoc County. It also covers a small portion of Pontotoc. The headquarters are in Pontotoc.

== Schools ==
- North Pontotoc High School (Ecru; Grades 9-12)
  - 2004 National Blue Ribbon School
- South Pontotoc High School (Springville; Grades 9-12)
  - 2011 5 Star School Mississippi's Highest Rating
- North Pontotoc Middle School (Ecru; Grades 6-8)
- South Pontotoc Middle School (Springville; Grades 6-8)
- North Pontotoc Elementary School (Ecru; Grades K-5)
- South Pontotoc Elementary School (Springville; Grades K-5)

== Demographics ==
=== 2006-07 school year ===
There were a total of 3,251 students enrolled in the Pontotoc County School District during the 2006–2007 school year. The gender makeup of the district was 50% female and 50% male. The racial makeup of the district was 10.43% African American, 84.68% White, 4.80% Hispanic, 0.06% Asian, and 0.03% Native American. 39.9% of the district's students were eligible to receive free lunch.

=== Previous school years ===
School Year	Enrollment	Gender Makeup		Racial Makeup				
School Year	Enrollment	Female	Male	Asian	African American	Hispanic	Native American	White
2005-06	3,219	50%	50%	0.06%	10.53%	4.22%	0.03%	85.15%
2004-05	3,134	49%	51%	0.10%	10.56%	3.61%	0.06%	85.67%
2003-04	3,125	49%	51%	0.10%	10.27%	2.98%	0.10%	86.56%
2002-03	3,035	48%	52%	0.10%	10.35%	2.34%	0.16%	87.05%

== Accountability statistics ==
	2006-07	2005-06	2004-05	2003-04	2002-03
District Accreditation Status	Accredited	Accredited	Accredited	Accredited	Accredited
School Performance Classifications
Level 5 (Superior Performing) Schools	4	5	6	6	5
Level 4 (Exemplary) Schools	2	1	0	0	1
Level 3 (Successful) Schools	0	0	0	0	0
Level 2 (Under Performing) Schools	0	0	0	0	0
Level 1 (Low Performing) Schools	0	0	0	0	0
Not Assigned	0	0	0	0	0

== See also ==
- List of school districts in Mississippi
