= Mississippi Highway 15 =

Highway in Mississippi

Mississippi Highway 15

Route information
- Maintained by MDOT
- Length: 323.949 mi (521.345 km)
- Existed: 1932–present

Southern segment
- South end: I-10 / I-110 in D'Iberville
- North end: MS 26 near Wiggins

Northern segment
- South end: US 98 near Beaumont
- Major intersections: I-59 / US 11 / US 84 in Laurel; US 80 in Newton; I-20 in Newton; US 82 in Mathiston; US 278 in Pontotoc; I-22 / US 78 in New Albany; US 72 in Walnut
- North end: SR 125 near Walnut

Location
- Country: United States
- State: Mississippi
- Counties: Harrison, Stone, Perry, Jones, Jasper, Newton, Neshoba, Winston, Choctaw, Webster, Oktibbeha, Chickasaw, Pontotoc, Union, Tippah

Highway system
- Mississippi State Highway System; Interstate; US; State
← MS 14	→ MS 16

Mississippi Highway 15 (MS 15) is a state highway in Mississippi. At almost 324 miles (521 km), it is the longest highway in the Mississippi Highway System. MS 15 is divided into two sections due to a large gap between Stone County and Perry County. The southern section begins at Interstate 10 (I-10) and I-110 in Biloxi and ends at a junction with MS 26 near Wiggins, and the northern section begins at a junction with U.S. Route 98 (US 98) near Beaumont and ends as a continuation as SR 125 near Walnut. It serves a total of 15 counties (Harrison, Stone, Perry, Jones, Jasper, Newton, Neshoba, Winston, Choctaw, Webster, Oktibbeha, Chickasaw, Pontotoc, Union, and Tippah).

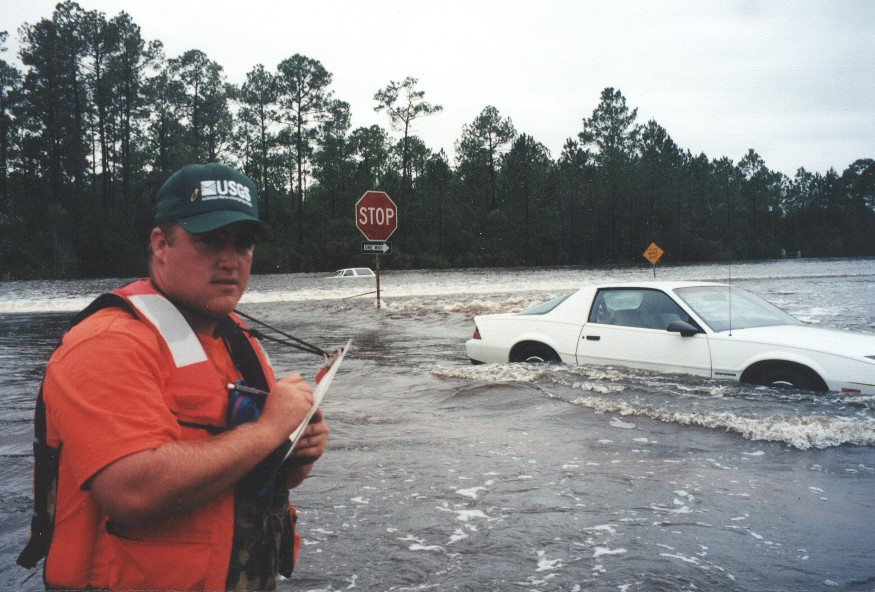
Water flowing over Old Hwy 67 and Mississippi Highway 15 near their intersection in Harrison County on September 29, 1998 during the September 1998 flooding caused on the Tchoutacabouffa River by Hurricane Georges.

== History ==
Prior to 1966, MS 15 was one continuous route through the entire state of Mississippi. The route formerly continued past I-10 and ran concurrent with I-110 to terminate at US 90.

== Major intersections ==
County	Location	mi	km	Destinations	Notes
Harrison	D'Iberville	0.0	0.0	I-10 – Pascagoula, Mobile, Gulfport, New Orleans I-110 south – Biloxi	Southern terminus of southern segment; I-10 exits 46A-B; south end of MS 67 overlap; signed as exits 4A (east) and 4B (west); cloverleaf interchange.
Harrison	D'Iberville	0.4	0.64	Sangani Boulevard / Promenade Parkway	Interchange
Harrison		2.5	4.0	MS 67 north – Hattiesburg	Interchange; north end of MS 67 overlap
Stone	Moore Crossing	32.8	52.8	MS 26 – Wiggins, Lucedale	Northern terminus of southern segment
Gap in route
Perry		32.8	52.8	US 98 / MS 198 begins – Lucedale, New Augusta	Southern terminus of northern segment; interchange; eastern terminus of Beaumont segment of MS 198; south end of MS 198 overlap
Perry	Beaumont	34.6	55.7	MS 198 west – New Augusta	North end of MS 198 overlap
Perry	Richton	47.3	76.1	MS 42 west – Hattiesburg	South end of MS 42 overlap
Perry	Richton	47.7	76.8	MS 42 east – State Line	North end of MS 42 overlap
Perry		66.3	106.7	George Boutwell Road (MS 536)	
Jones	Laurel	74.1	119.3	I-59 north / US 84 east / Cook Avenue – Meridian, Waynesboro	South end of I-59 / US 84 overlap; MS 15 south follows exit 96B
Jones	Laurel	74.3	119.6	4th Avenue / Masonite Road	I-59 exit 96A
Jones	Laurel	74.8	120.4	Beacon Street	I-59 exit 95C
Jones	Laurel	75.6	121.7	I-59 south / 16th Avenue south – Hattiesburg, Hattiesburg-Laurel Regional Airport	North end of I-59 overlap; MS 15 north follows exit 95B
Jones	Laurel	76.4	123.0	US 84 west / 5th Street – Collins, Downtown Laurel, Veterans Memorial Museum	North end of US 84 overlap
Jones		84.9	136.6	MS 537 south – Moss	Northern terminus of MS 537
Jasper		90.2	145.2	MS 533 south – Soso	Northern terminus of MS 533
Jasper	Bay Springs	99.3	159.8	MS 528 east – Heidelberg	Western terminus of MS 528
Jasper	Bay Springs	99.4	160.0	MS 18 – Raleigh, Pachuta	
Newton		121.1	194.9	MS 504 east – Hero	Western terminus of MS 504
Newton	Newton	126.7	203.9	US 80 – Newton, Hickory, Mississippi Veterans Memorial Cemetery	
Newton	Newton	127.3	204.9	I-20 – Jackson, Meridian	I-20 exit 109
Newton	Decatur	135.4	217.9	MS 503 south – Hickory	Northern terminus of MS 503
Newton	Union	144.2	232.1	MS 494 east – Little Rock, Meridian	Western terminus of MS 494
Newton	Union	145.0	233.4	MS 492 – Sebastopol, House, Downtown Union	
Neshoba	Good Hope	156.5	251.9	MS 485 south	Northern terminus of MS 485
Neshoba	Philadelphia	158.4	254.9	MS 21 south to MS 488 – Sebastopol, Forest, Neshoba County Fairgrounds	South end of MS 21 overlap
Neshoba	Philadelphia	158.6	255.2	MS 16 west – Carthage, Casinos	South end of MS 16 overlap
Neshoba	Philadelphia	159.4	256.5	MS 16 east / MS 19 south / MS 21 north – Philadelphia, De Kalb, Meridian	North end of MS 16 / MS 21 overlap; south end of MS 19 overlap
Neshoba	Philadelphia	159.7	257.0	MS 885	
Neshoba	Philadelphia	162.9	262.2	MS 19 north – Kosciusko, Airport	Interchange; north end of MS 19 overlap
Winston	Noxapater	177.1	285.0	MS 395 south / MS 490 east – Plattsburg, De Kalb, Nanih Waiya State Park	Northern terminus of MS 395; western terminus of MS 490
Winston	Louisville	185.3	298.2	MS 25 south – Carthage	Interchange; south end of MS 25 overlap
Winston	Louisville	186.7	300.5	MS 14 – Kosciusko, Downtown Louisville, Macon	
Winston		189.0	304.2	MS 25 north / MS 758 west – Starkville, Mississippi State University	Interchange; north end of MS 25 overlap
Choctaw		198.7	319.8	FR 967 (Choctaw Lake Road) – Choctaw Lake Wildlife Management	Proposed MS 768
Choctaw	Ackerman	201.4	324.1	W Main Street/MS 759 south	Northern terminus of unsigned MS 759
Choctaw	Ackerman	202.0	325.1	MS 12 to MS 9 – Kosciusko, Starkville	
Choctaw	Williams	207.2	333.5	MS 790 west	Eastern terminus of MS 790
Webster	Mathiston	217.7	350.4	US 82 west / MS 403 north – Eupora, Winona, Wood Institute	South end of US 82 overlap
Webster		218.5	351.6	US 82 east – Starkville, Columbus	Interchange; north end of US 82 overlap
Webster		223.5	359.7	MS 50 east – West Point	South end of MS 50 overlap
Webster		225.1	362.3	MS 50 west – Cumberland	North end of MS 50 overlap
Webster		228.1	367.1	Natchez Trace Parkway	Interchange
Webster	Mantee	233.1	375.1	MS 46 – Mantee, Montpelier	
Chickasaw	Woodland	236.3	380.3	MS 340 west – Atlanta, Woodland	Eastern terminus of MS 340
Chickasaw	Houston	244.7	393.8	MS 8 to MS 389 – Grenada, Houston	Interchange
Chickasaw		251.3	404.4	MS 32 east – Okolona	South end of MS 32 overlap
Chickasaw	Old Houlka	255.9	411.8	MS 32 west – Houlka, Davis Lake	North end of MS 32 overlap
Pontotoc	Algoma	265.7	427.6	MS 772 west (Algoma Road) – Algoma, Tanglefoot Trail	Eastern terminus of MS 772
Pontotoc	Pontotoc	269.1	433.1	MS 41 – Downtown Pontotoc, Troy, Okolona	
Pontotoc	Pontotoc	271.1	436.3	To MS 9 south (Spur Road (MS 770)) – Oxford	
Pontotoc	Pontotoc	271.4	436.8	MS 9 / MS 338 – Oxford, Tupelo	
Pontotoc	Pontotoc	271.8	437.4	MS 336 – Tupelo, Airport	
Pontotoc	Pontotoc	273.9	440.8	US 278 / MS 6 to MS 9 – Oxford, truck to MS 9 north	Interchange
Pontotoc	Ecru	277.9	447.2	MS 346 west – Hurricane	Eastern terminus of MS 346
Pontotoc	Ecru	278.6	448.4	MS 345 south – Ecru	Northern terminus of MS 345
Union		282.7	455.0	MS 762 west – Ingomar, Tanglefoot Trail	Eastern terminus of MS 762
Union	New Albany	287.0	461.9	I-22 / US 78 / MS 30 west – Memphis, Tupelo	Interchange; south end of MS 30 overlap; I-22 exit 64
Union	New Albany	287.9	463.3	MS 178 – Downtown New Albany	
Union	New Albany	288.1	463.7	MS 348 east – Center, Ellistown	Western terminus of MS 348
Union	New Albany	288.6	464.5	MS 30 east – Booneville, Union County Museum, Northeast Mississippi Community College	North end of MS 30 overlap
Tippah	Blue Mountain	301.2	484.7	MS 2 west to MS 368 – Hickory Flat	Eastern terminus of MS 2
Tippah	Ripley	307.7	495.2	MS 4 / MS 370 east to MS 2 – Booneville	South end of MS 370 overlap; Eastern terminus of MS 370
Tippah		315.7	508.1	MS 370 west – Ashland	North end of MS 370 overlap
Tippah		322.8	519.5	CR 302	Proposed MS 369
Tippah		323.0	519.8	Main Street (MS 777 north) - Downtown Walnut	Southern terminus of unsigned MS 777
Tippah	Walnut	323.7	520.9	MS 354 east (Commerce Street) – Walnut Business District, Chalybeate	Western terminus of MS 354
Tippah	Walnut	324.1	521.6	US 72 – Memphis, Corinth	
Tippah		327.2	526.6	SR 125 north – Middleton	Tennessee state line; northern terminus of northern segment
1.000 mi = 1.609 km; 1.000 km = 0.621 mi: Concurrency terminus
