= Furrs, Mississippi =

- Unincorporated community
- Location within Mississippi Location within the United States
- Coordinates: 34°14′06″N 88°51′36″W
- Country: United States
- State: Mississippi
- County: Pontotoc
- Elevation: 341 ft (104 m)
- Time zone: UTC-6 (Central (CST))
  - Summer (DST): UTC-5 (CDT)
- GNIS feature ID: 670275

Furrs (also called Hoyle) is an unincorporated community in Pontotoc County, Mississippi, United States.

== History ==
A school was noted in Furrs in 1885. Furrs had a post office, and a population of 66 in 1900.
