= Tombigbee State Park =

State park in Mississippi, United States

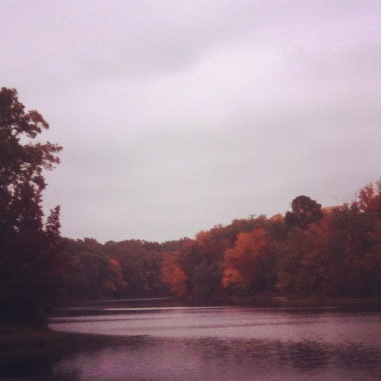

- Location within Mississippi
- Location: Lee County, Mississippi, United States
- Coordinates: 34°13′56″N 88°37′35″W
- Area: 480 acres (190 ha)
- Elevation: 390 ft (120 m)
- Established: 1934
- Administrator: Mississippi Department of Wildlife, Fisheries, and Parks
- Designation: Mississippi state park
- Named for: The Tombigbee River
- Website: Official website
- Tombigbee State Park
- U.S. National Register of Historic Places
- U.S. Historic district
- Nearest city: Tupelo, Mississippi
- Area: 40 acres (16 ha)
- Built: 1934
- Built by: Civilian Conservation Corps
- Architectural style: Rustic
- MPS: State Parks in Mississippi built by the CCC between 1934 - 1942
- NRHP reference No.: 99000382
- Added to NRHP: March 25, 1999

Tombigbee State Park is a public recreation area located off Mississippi Highway 6 five miles (8.0 km) east of Tupelo, Mississippi. The state park surrounds 90-acre (36 ha) Lake Lee and is named for the nearby Tombigbee River.

== History ==
The state park was among the first state parks built in Mississippi in the 1930s by the Civilian Conservation Corps. The CCC began work on June 1, 1934; the park was opened to the public in 1936. The Tombigbee State Park Historic District was named to the National Register of Historic Places in 1999.

== Activities and amenities ==
The park features lake fishing, primitive and developed campsites, cabins and cottage, picnicking area, and two disc golf courses.
