= Chiwapa, Mississippi =

Unincorporated community in Mississippi, US

- Unincorporated community
- Location within Mississippi Location within the United States
- Coordinates: 34°10′53″N 88°55′51″W
- Country: United States
- State: Mississippi
- County: Pontotoc
- Elevation: 443 ft (135 m)
- Time zone: UTC-6 (Central (CST))
  - Summer (DST): UTC-5 (CDT)
- GNIS feature ID: 668404

Chiwapa is an unincorporated community in Pontotoc County, in the U.S. state of Mississippi.

== History ==
The community takes its name from Chiwapa Creek, which flows near the town site. A post office called Chiwapa was established in 1883, and remained in operation until 1906.
