= Wren, Mississippi =

- Unincorporated community
- Location within Mississippi Location within the United States
- Coordinates: 33°58′18″N 88°35′59″W
- Country: United States
- State: Mississippi
- County: Monroe
- Elevation: 279 ft (85 m)
- Time zone: UTC-6 (Central (CST))
  - Summer (DST): UTC-5 (CDT)
- GNIS feature ID: 679885

Wren (also known as Wrens) is an unincorporated community in Monroe County, Mississippi.

Wren is located between Amory and Okolona. The nearby community of New Wren is located on U.S. Route 45 (US 45), near its intersection with US 278.

== History ==
In 1900, Wren had three stores and a high school.

A post office operated under the name Wren from 1900 to 1904.

The Wren Lookout Tower is listed on the National Historic Lookout Register.

The community is served by two volunteer fire departments.

Wren was hit by a large, and violent EF3 tornado on April 27, 2011. This tornado had devastated areas to the southwest in the towns of Houston, and Okolona, before moving through the communities of Wren, and New Wren. A total of 7 fatalities occurred from this tornado. The same supercell that produced this tornado, would later produce an EF5 rated tornado that would devastate the towns of Smithville, and Shottsville

Wren was hit by a fast-moving EF3 tornado on March 24, 2023. Prior to impacting Wren, the tornado struck Amory. A 172-year-old church was demolished during the storms. There were two fatalities, along with a serious injury that occurred during the tornadic event.

The Wren Field is a natural gas field located in Wren.

== Notable person ==
- John Johnson, former member of the Mississippi House of Representatives and the Mississippi Senate
