= Randolph, Mississippi =

CDP in Mississippi, US

- Census-designated place
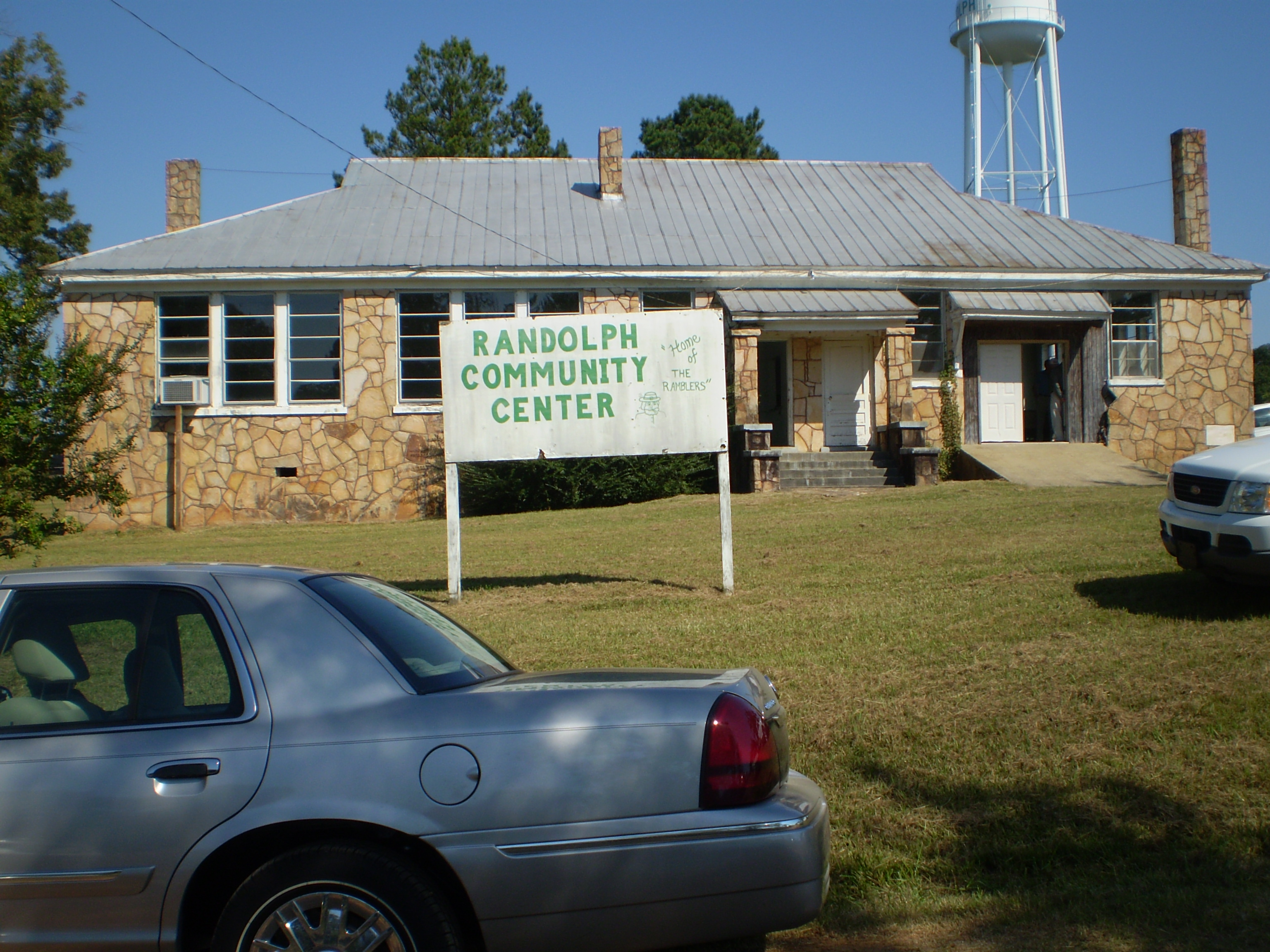
- Randolph Community Center and water tower

- Location within Mississippi
- Coordinates: 34°10′52″N 89°10′04″W
- Country: United States
- State: Mississippi
- County: Pontotoc

Area
  - Total: 1.60 sq mi (4.1 km^{2})
  - Land: 1.58 sq mi (4.1 km^{2})
  - Water: 0.02 sq mi (0.052 km^{2})
- Elevation: 518 ft (158 m)

Population (2020)
  - Total: 197
  - Density: 123.13/sq mi (47.54/km^{2})
- Time zone: UTC-6 (Central (CST))
  - Summer (DST): UTC-5 (CDT)
- Postal code: 38864
- Area code: 662
- FIPS code: 28-60880
- GNIS feature ID: 2812738

Randolph is a census-designated place (CDP) and unincorporated community in Pontotoc County, Mississippi. Randolph is located along Mississippi Highway 9. It was first named as a CDP in the 2020 Census. As of the 2020 census, Randolph had a population of 197.

== History ==
Randolph is named for John Randolph, a settler who moved to the area from Kentucky and operated a store in the area.

In 1900, Randolph had a population of 162 and two churches.

A school opened in Randolph in the 1840s. By 1935, this school had consolidated with several other schools and was known as Randolph High School. Randolph High School closed in 1972.

A post office first opened under the name Randolph in 1854.

Randolph is home to the only remaining Amish community in the Deep South. In 1995, a group of Swartzentruber Amish from Ethridge, Tennessee founded a community on the outskirts of Randolph.

== Demographics ==
Historical population
Census	Pop.	Note	%±
2020	197		—
U.S. Decennial Census; 2020

Randolph was first listed as a census designated place in the 2020 U.S. census.

=== 2020 census ===
Randolph CDP, Mississippi – Racial and ethnic composition Note: the US Census treats Hispanic/Latino as an ethnic category. This table excludes Latinos from the racial categories and assigns them to a separate category. Hispanics/Latinos may be of any race.
Race / Ethnicity (NH = Non-Hispanic)	Pop 2020	% 2020
White alone (NH)	174	88.32%
Black or African American alone (NH)	0	0.00%
Native American or Alaska Native alone (NH)	0	0.00%
Asian alone (NH)	0	0.00%
Pacific Islander alone (NH)	0	0.00%
Some Other Race alone (NH)	0	0.00%
Mixed Race or Multi-Racial (NH)	12	6.09%
Hispanic or Latino (any race)	11	5.58%
Total	197	100.00%

== Education ==
It is in the Pontotoc County School District.
