= Trace State Park =

State park in Mississippi, United States

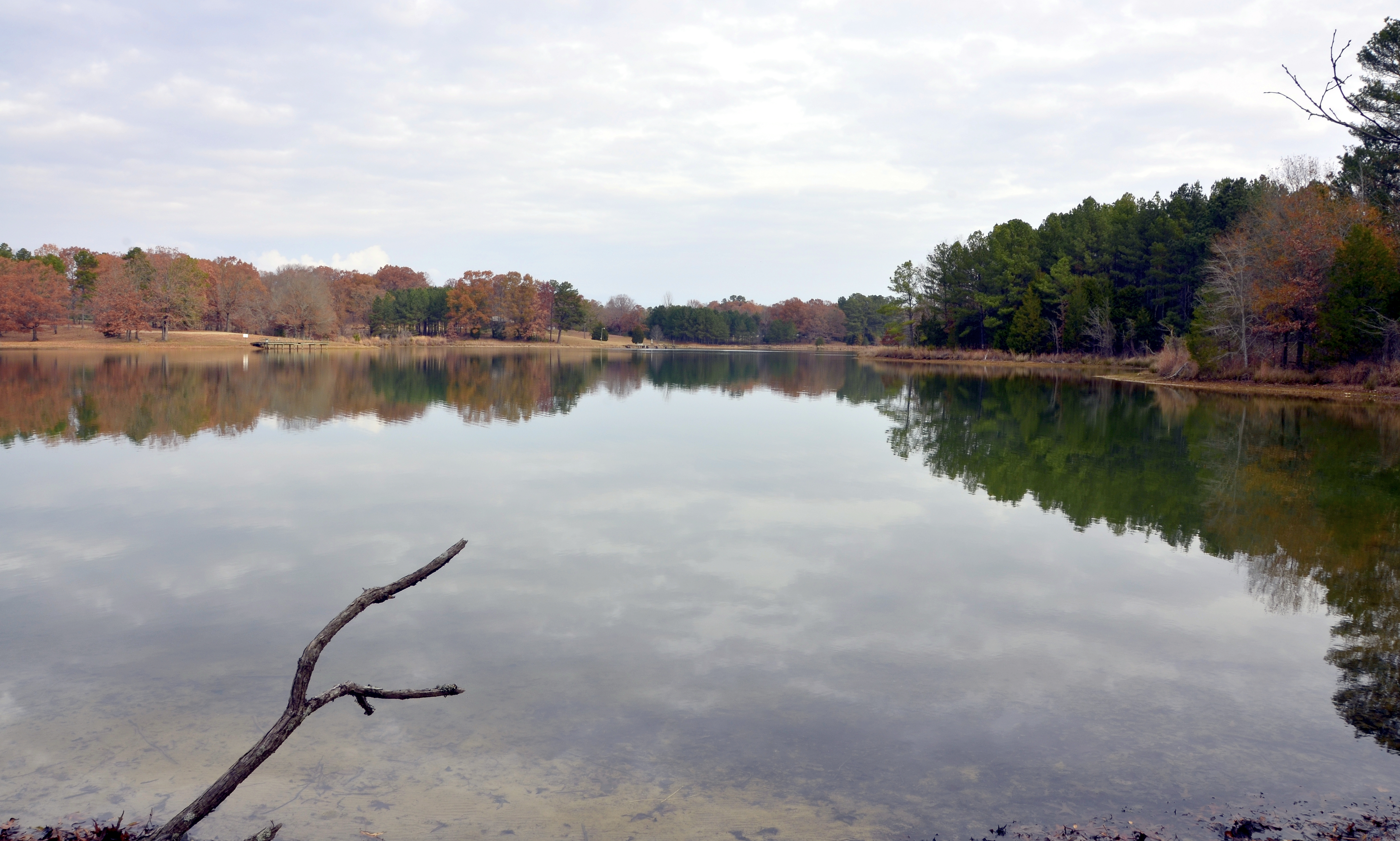

- Location within Mississippi
- Location: Pontotoc County, Mississippi, United States
- Coordinates: 34°15′37″N 88°57′23″W
- Elevation: 400 ft (120 m)
- Administrator: Mississippi Department of Wildlife, Fisheries and Parks
- Designation: Mississippi state park
- Named for: The Natchez Trace
- Website: Official website

Trace State Park (formerly Old Natchez Trace Park) is a public recreation area located off Mississippi Highway 6, seven miles (11 km) east of Pontotoc and seven miles (11 km) west of Tupelo in the U.S. state of Mississippi. The state park surrounds 565-acre (229 ha) Trace Lake and is named for the nearby Natchez Trace trail. Famed frontiersman Davy Crockett once lived within the area bounded by the park.

== Activities and amenities ==
The park features boating, waterskiing and fishing, primitive and developed campsites, cabins and cottages, the Jason M. Stewart Nature Trail, 35 miles (56 km) of trails for mountain biking, horseback riding and off-road vehicles, picnic area, and two 18-hole disc golf courses.
