= Pontotoc High School =

Location
- 123 North Main Street; Pontotoc, Mississippi 38863; United States
- Coordinates: 34.251152°N 88.999873°W

Information
- Type: Public
- School district: Pontotoc City School District
- Principal: Kenneth McGaha
- Staff: 45.26 (FTE)
- Grades: 9 to 12
- Gender: Co-ed
- Enrollment: 713 (2023-2024)
- Student to teacher ratio: 15.75
- Colors: Black and Gold
- Mascot: Warriors
- Newspaper: Tomahawk Talk
- Yearbook: The Warrior
- Website: phs.pontotoc.school

Pontotoc High School is a secondary school in Pontotoc, Mississippi. Its boundary covers almost all of Pontotoc and some unincorporated areas.

== Sports ==
Pontotoc High School is active in 15 varsity sports and play as "The Warriors." Varsity sports include Baseball, Basketball, Bowling, Cross Country Running, Football, Golf, Powerlifting, Soccer, Softball, Tennis, Track and Field, and Volleyball.

=== Basketball ===
The Warriors and Lady Warriors have a history of success at division, North Half, and state levels of competition.

The 2009-2010 Warriors were the first boys team in Pontotoc history to make it to the 3rd round of the North Half tournament, the first to win North Half, and the first to go to the State Tournament in Jackson, Mississippi. The Warriors' historic run was ended when St. Stanislaus beat them 65–39 in the first round of State.

=== Football ===
The Warrior football team competes in Mississippi's Division 1-4A.

=== Tennis ===
The 2008 Pontotoc Warriors qualified two girls for the state tournament — Katherine Downing and Frankie Turner. They subsequently won the State Championship.

=== Bowling ===
Pontotoc's bowling team, a relatively new sport at PHS, is already garnering attention around the state as the boys bowling team won Mississippi's Class I title in 2009. The Boys Bowling Team came in 4th at the 2010 State Championship, and they were the only 4A team that made it to State.

=== Cross Country ===
The girls and boys cross country teams, coached by Mike Bain, a Mississippi coaching legend, have a long history of success at the division and state level. The Lady Warrior cross country team won the 2007 4A state championship. And the girls and boys teams won the 2009 State Champions.

== Extracurriculars ==
The school participates in Band, Cheerleading, and Dance competitions.

=== Cheerleading ===
Pontotoc High School's cheerleading squad consists of 16 girls who compete for the spots each year in an extremely competitive tryout week. In 2008, the Warrior Cheerleaders won the State 4A Small Division state championship. They took home the Academic Award, stating that they had the highest GPA of all squads in Mississippi from 1A-5A.

=== Bands ===
Though the sports at Pontotoc High School garner attention and praise from around the state, Pontotoc High School's most respected and successful program is the Pontotoc Warrior Band Program.

==== Marching Band ====
The Pontotoc Warrior Marching band consists of around 145 members, including drum majors, color guard members, marching percussion, marching winds, and a pit. The Warrior Marching Band is known throughout the state for its outstanding musical and marching abilities.

Year	Theme	Repertoire	State Result
2018	Fahrenheit 451		2
2017	The Odyssey	The Storm / The Lotus Eaters / The Cyclops / The Sirens and Charybdis / Return to Ithaca	1
2016	Life on Mars	Separation / Survival / Salvation // Featuring the music of David Bowie: Space Oddity, Life on Mars, and Starman	5
2015	Mercury Rising	Cool / Red Red Red / Fire / Mercury Rising	2
2014	Distorted Images	Featuring the music of Michael Daugherty	3
2013	The Killer Bees	Bach / Beethoven / Bon Jovie / ???	3

Year	Theme	Repertoire	State Result
2009	"Black and Blue: A Symphonic Jazz Suite"	Awayday / Rhapsody in Blue / Sevens / Blue Shades	4
2008	"West Side Story"	Prologue / Overture / Mambo / Somewhere / America / Tonight	2
2007	"Spanish Dreamscapes: Fire, Passion, and Fury"	La Mezquita de Cordoba	3
2006	"Sunset Boulevard"	Sunset Boulevard film score	6
2005	"Gladiator"		7

==== Concert Bands ====
The Pontotoc High School band consists of four concert bands: the Symphonic Band, the Concert Band, the Varsity Band, and the Jazz Band.
