= Elvis Presley Birthplace =

Historic museum at the birthplace of Elvis Presley

Coordinates: 34.259971°N 88.679963°W

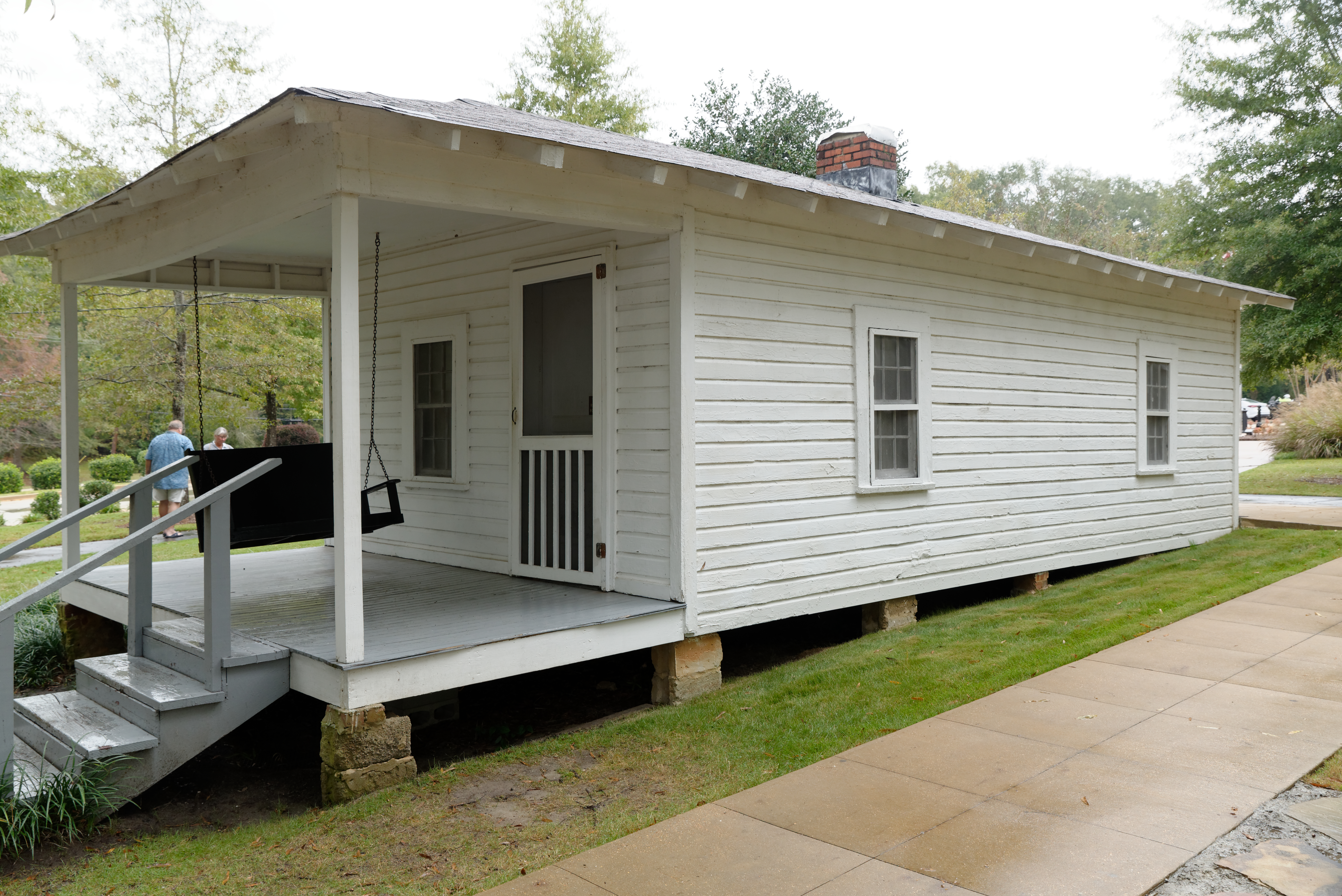
Presley's birthplace in Tupelo, Mississippi

The Elvis Presley Birthplace is a historic museum site in Tupelo, Mississippi, dedicated to the preservation of the birthplace of American musician Elvis Presley. It is listed on the Mississippi Blues Trail.

The museum site includes Presley's shotgun house birthplace, a museum, a chapel, and the Assembly of God Church building where the Presley family worshiped. Elvis' parents, Vernon and Gladys, experienced financial hardship and had to move from the home when Elvis was a few years old for lack of payment. Vernon and Gladys worked various jobs while in Tupelo and moved several times during the thirteen years they resided in Mississippi.

In 1936, a catastrophic tornado struck eight miles (13 km) outside the city, killing hundreds but sparing the Presleys' house, and the family was unharmed.

== See also ==
- List of music museums
- List of Mississippi Landmarks (Under Lee County)
