= Rough Edge, Mississippi =

- Unincorporated community
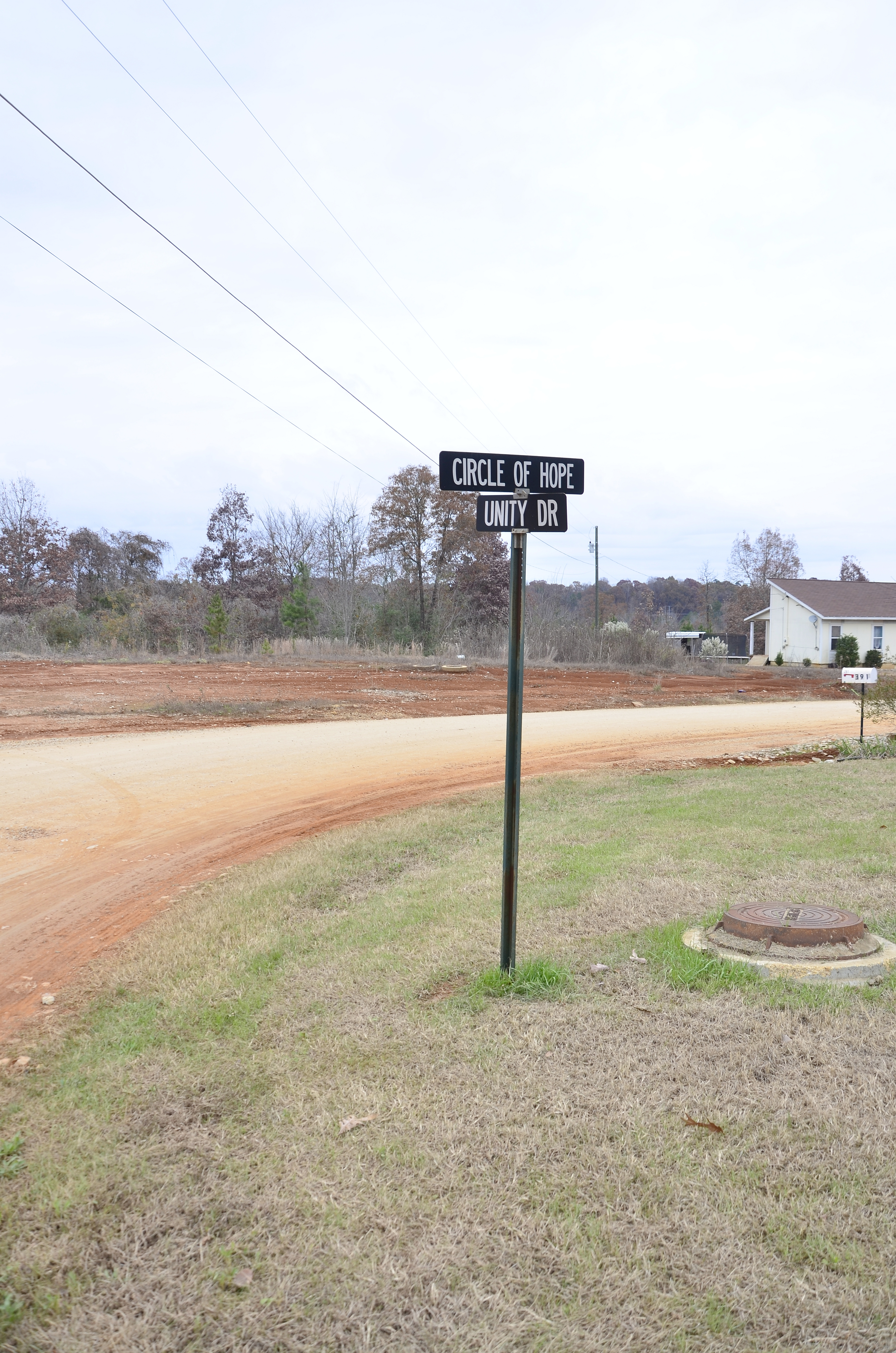
- Circle of Hope and Unity Drive in Rough Edge

- Location within Mississippi Location within the United States
- Coordinates: 34°15′21″N 88°58′32″W
- Country: United States
- State: Mississippi
- County: Pontotoc
- Elevation: 541 ft (165 m)
- Time zone: UTC-6 (Central (CST))
  - Summer (DST): UTC-5 (CDT)
- GNIS feature ID: 676895

Rough Edge is an unincorporated community in Pontotoc County, Mississippi.

The settlement is located approximately 1 mi (1.6 km) northeast of Pontotoc.

Rough Edge is mentioned in A Piece of My Heart, a novel by Mississippi writer Richard Ford.
