= Pontotoc City School District =

School district in Mississippi

Coordinates: 34.251712°N 88.997710°W

The Pontotoc City School District is a public school district based in Pontotoc, Mississippi (USA). It covers almost all of Pontotoc and some unincorporated areas.

== Schools ==
- Pontotoc High School
  - In the 2011–2012 school year, the Pontotoc High School Lady Warriors basketball team was 34–0 and were State Champions.
  - 2003 National Blue Ribbon School
- Pontotoc Junior High School
  - 1992–1993 National Blue Ribbon School
- Pontotoc Middle School
- D.T. Cox Elementary School
  - 1989–1990 and 1998–1999 National Blue Ribbon School
- Pontotoc Elementary School

== Demographics ==
=== 2006-07 school year ===
There were a total of 2,298 students enrolled in the Pontotoc City School District during the 2006–2007 school year. The gender makeup of the district was 48% female and 52% male. The racial makeup of the district was 27.72% African American, 66.80% White, 5.00% Hispanic, and 0.48% Asian. 41.1% of the district's students were eligible to receive free lunch.

=== Previous school years ===
School Year	Enrollment	Gender Makeup		Racial Makeup				
School Year	Enrollment	Female	Male	Asian	African American	Hispanic	Native American	White
2005-06	2,328	48%	52%	0.39%	27.88%	3.82%	–	67.91%
2004-05	2,272	48%	52%	0.40%	27.16%	3.57%	–	68.88%
2003-04	2,275	50%	50%	0.31%	27.47%	2.59%	–	69.69%
2002-03	2,266	49%	51%	0.35%	27.10%	1.90%	0.04%	70.61%

== Accountability statistics ==
	2006-07	2005-06	2004-05	2003-04	2002-03
District Accreditation Status	Accredited	Accredited	Accredited	Accredited	Accredited
School Performance Classifications
Level 5 (Superior Performing) Schools	2	3	3	3	1
Level 4 (Exemplary) Schools	1	0	0	0	2
Level 3 (Successful) Schools	0	0	0	0	0
Level 2 (Under Performing) Schools	0	0	0	0	0
Level 1 (Low Performing) Schools	0	0	0	0	0
Not Assigned	1	1	1	1	1

== See also ==
- List of school districts in Mississippi
