= Thaxton, Mississippi =

- Town
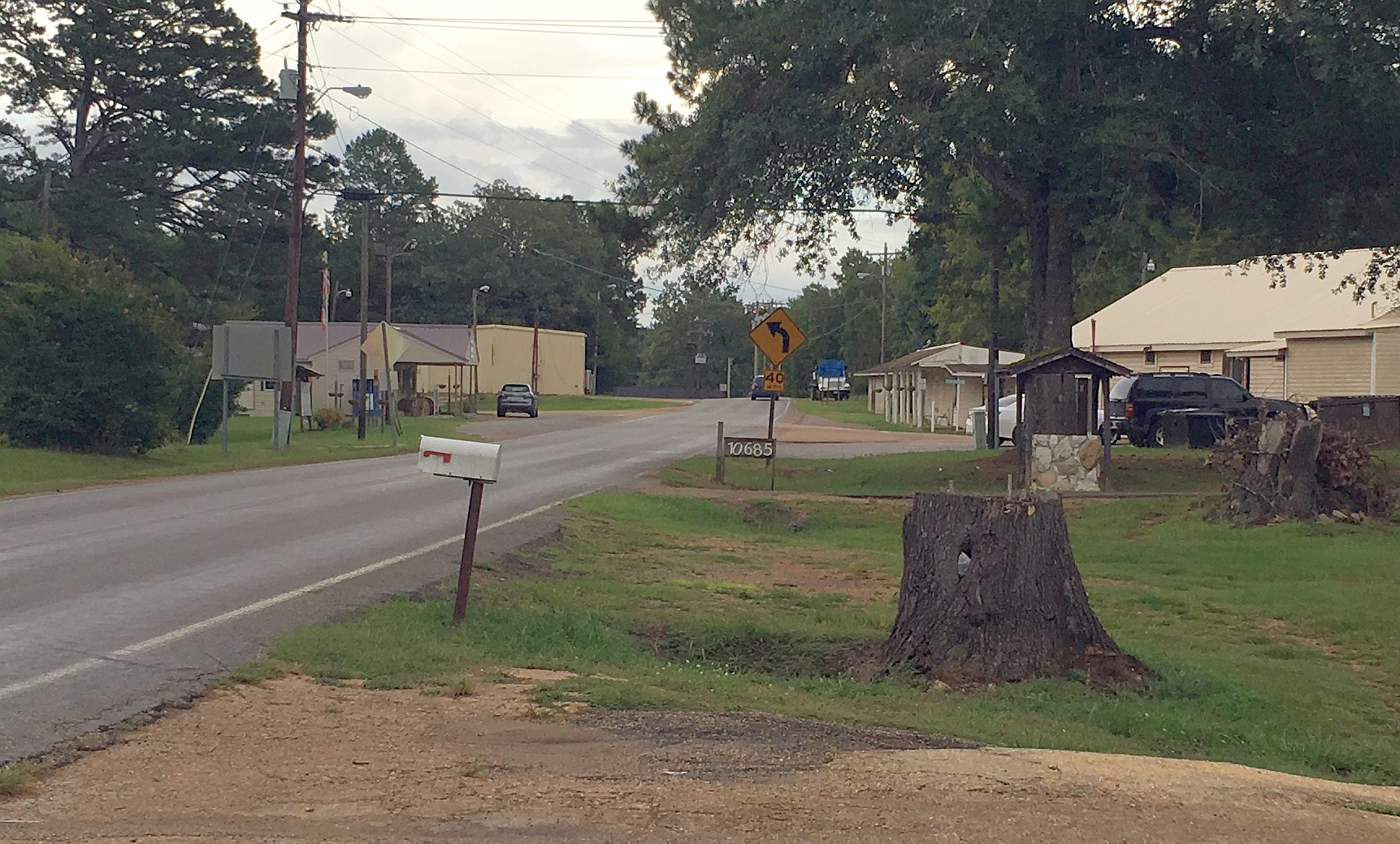
- Looking east on Mississippi Highway 336 in downtown Thaxton just west of the intersection with Pontotoc County Road 836.

- Location of Thaxton, Mississippi

- Location in the United States
- Coordinates: 34°18′26″N 89°10′28″W
- Country: United States
- State: Mississippi
- County: Pontotoc

Area
  - Total: 10.47 sq mi (27.12 km^{2})
  - Land: 10.37 sq mi (26.87 km^{2})
  - Water: 0.097 sq mi (0.25 km^{2})
- Elevation: 430 ft (130 m)

Population (2020)
  - Total: 692
  - Density: 66.7/sq mi (25.75/km^{2})
- Time zone: UTC-6 (Central (CST))
  - Summer (DST): UTC-5 (CDT)
- ZIP code: 38871
- Area code: 662
- FIPS code: 28-72760
- GNIS feature ID: 2406728

Thaxton is a town in Pontotoc County, Mississippi, United States. As of the 2020 census, Thaxton had a population of 692.

== Geography ==
According to the United States Census Bureau, the town has a total area of 8.5 square miles (22 km^{2}), of which 8.5 square miles (22 km^{2}) is land and 0.04 square miles (0.10 km^{2}) (0.47%) is water.

== Demographics ==
Historical population
| Census | Pop. | Note | %± |
|---|---|---|---|
| 1910 | 143 | | — |
| 1980 | 404 | | — |
| 1990 | 431 | | 6.7% |
| 2000 | 513 | | 19.0% |
| 2010 | 643 | | 25.3% |
| 2020 | 692 | | 7.6% |
U.S. Decennial Census

As of the census of 2000, there were 513 people, 173 households, and 146 families residing in the town. The population density was 60.4 inhabitants per square mile (23.3/km^{2}). There were 192 housing units at an average density of 22.6 per square mile (8.7/km^{2}). The racial makeup of the town was 99.22% White and 0.78% African American. Hispanic or Latino of any race were 1.17% of the population.

There were 173 households, out of which 49.7% had children under the age of 18 living with them, 72.8% were married couples living together, 8.1% had a female householder with no husband present, and 15.6% were non-families. 12.1% of all households were made up of individuals, and 7.5% had someone living alone who was 65 years of age or older. The average household size was 2.97 and the average family size was 3.22.

In the town, the population was spread out, with 29.4% under the age of 18, 12.3% from 18 to 24, 29.6% from 25 to 44, 19.7% from 45 to 64, and 9.0% who were 65 years of age or older. The median age was 34 years. For every 100 females there were 98.1 males. For every 100 females age 18 and over, there were 94.6 males.

The median income for a household in the town was $41,750, and the median income for a family was $42,250. Males had a median income of $31,528 versus $20,536 for females. The per capita income for the town was $15,941. About 8.2% of families and 9.2% of the population were below the poverty line, including 13.7% of those under age 18 and 6.7% of those age 65 or over.

== Education ==
The town of Thaxton is served by the Pontotoc County School District.
