= Ecru, Mississippi =

- Town
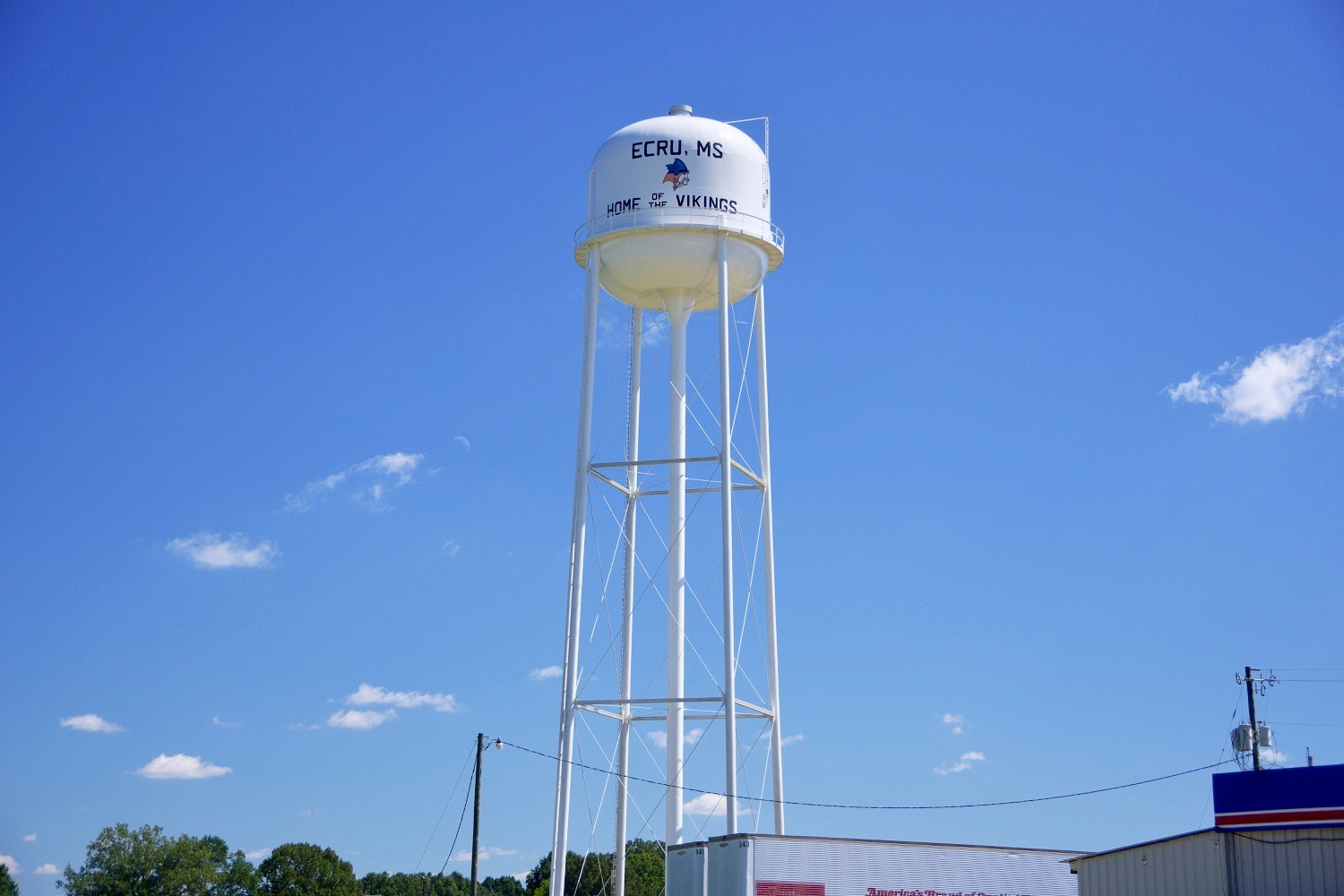
- Water tower in Ecru

- Location of Ecru, Mississippi

- Location in the United States
- Coordinates: 34°21′30″N 89°01′32″W
- Country: United States
- State: Mississippi
- County: Pontotoc

Area
  - Total: 4.72 sq mi (12.22 km^{2})
  - Land: 4.71 sq mi (12.21 km^{2})
  - Water: 0.0039 sq mi (0.01 km^{2})
- Elevation: 387 ft (118 m)

Population (2020)
  - Total: 901
  - Density: 191.1/sq mi (73.78/km^{2})
- Time zone: UTC-6 (Central (CST))
  - Summer (DST): UTC-5 (CDT)
- ZIP code: 38841
- Area code: 662
- FIPS code: 28-21340
- GNIS feature ID: 2406421

Ecru is a town in Pontotoc County, Mississippi. As of the 2020 census, Ecru had a population of 901. Ecru is home to the largest upholstered furniture plant in the world which manufactures Ashley Furniture.

== History ==
Ecru was established by Colonel William Clark Falkner, a prominent post-Civil War businessman. The name of the town comes from the color of its first railroad depot.

== Geography ==
Ecru is located in northern Pontotoc County along Mississippi Highway 15, with the older parts of town stretching eastward along Mississippi Highway 345. The Ashley Furniture plant lies in the southwestern part of town along Mississippi Highway 346. MS 15 connects Ecru to Interstate 22 and New Albany to the north, and Pontotoc to the south. The Little Tallahatchie River, a tributary of the Tallahatchie River, flows through southern Ecru. A rail trail, the Tanglefoot Trail, passes through the town.

According to the United States Census Bureau, the town has a total area of 4.1 square miles (11 km^{2}), of which 4.1 square miles (11 km^{2}) is land and 0.24% is water.

== Demographics ==
Historical population
Census	Pop.	Note	%±
1910	475		—
1920	642		35.2%
1930	560		−12.8%
1940	601		7.3%
1950	494		−17.8%
1960	442		−10.5%
1970	417		−5.7%
1980	687		64.7%
1990	696		1.3%
2000	947		36.1%
2010	895		−5.5%
2020	901		0.7%
U.S. Decennial Census

As of the census of 2000, there were 947 people, 374 households, and 259 families residing in the town. The population density was 231.3 inhabitants per square mile (89.3/km^{2}). There were 411 housing units at an average density of 100.4 per square mile (38.8/km^{2}). The racial makeup of the town was 82.37% White, 14.36% African American, 0.32% Native American, 1.80% from other races, and 1.16% from two or more races. Hispanic or Latino of any race were 2.64% of the population.

There were 374 households, out of which 32.4% had children under the age of 18 living with them, 54.3% were married couples living together, 11.8% had a female householder with no husband present, and 30.5% were non-families. 28.1% of all households were made up of individuals, and 12.3% had someone living alone who was 65 years of age or older. The average household size was 2.46 and the average family size was 3.05.

In the town, the population was spread out, with 24.9% under the age of 18, 8.4% from 18 to 24, 28.1% from 25 to 44, 21.3% from 45 to 64, and 17.2% who were 65 years of age or older. The median age was 37 years. For every 100 females, there were 95.3 males. For every 100 females age 18 and over, there were 91.6 males.

The median income for a household in the town was $30,815, and the median income for a family was $38,571. Males had a median income of $27,961 versus $20,263 for females. The per capita income for the town was $15,447. About 6.5% of families and 11.4% of the population were below the poverty line, including 10.4% of those under age 18 and 21.8% of those age 65 or over.

== Education ==
The town of Ecru is served by the Pontotoc County School District.

== Notable person ==
- W. Kenneth Holditch, English professor and Tennessee Williams scholar
