= Pontotoc County, Mississippi =

County in Mississippi, United States

- County
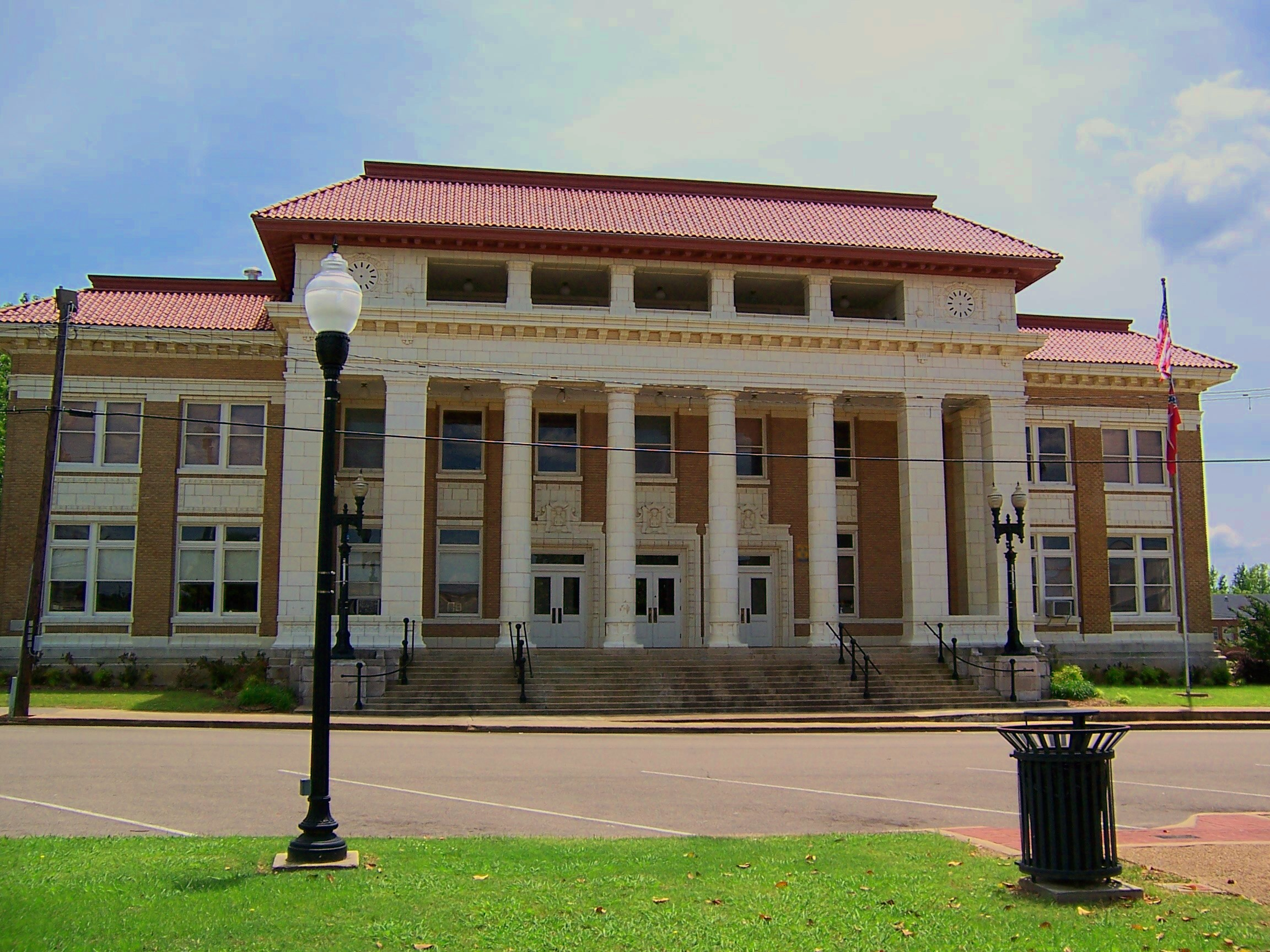
- Pontotoc County Courthouse in Pontotoc

- Flag

- Location within the U.S. state of Mississippi
- Coordinates: 34°14′N 89°02′W
- Country: United States
- State: Mississippi
- Founded: 1836
- Named for: Chickasaw word for the region meaning either "cattail prairie" "land of hanging grapes"
- Seat: Pontotoc
- Largest city: Pontotoc

Area
  - Total: 501 sq mi (1,300 km^{2})
  - Land: 498 sq mi (1,290 km^{2})
  - Water: 3.3 sq mi (8.5 km^{2}) 0.7%

Population (2020)
  - Total: 31,184
  - Estimate (2025): 32,096 ▲
  - Density: 62.6/sq mi (24.2/km^{2})
- Time zone: UTC−6 (Central)
  - Summer (DST): UTC−5 (CDT)
- Congressional district: 1st
- Website: pontotoccoms.com

Pontotoc County is a county located in the U.S. state of Mississippi. As of the 2020 census, the population was 31,184. Its county seat is Pontotoc. It was created on February 9, 1836, from lands ceded to the United States under the Chickasaw Cession. Pontotoc is a Chickasaw word meaning "land of hanging grapes". The original Natchez Trace and the current-day Natchez Trace Parkway both pass through the southeast corner of Pontotoc County.

Pontotoc County is part of the Tupelo, MS Micropolitan Statistical Area.

== Geography ==
According to the U.S. Census Bureau, the county has a total area of 501 square miles (1,300 km^{2}), of which 498 square miles (1,290 km^{2}) is land and 3.3 square miles (8.5 km^{2}) (0.7%) is water.

=== Major highways ===
- Interstate 22
- U.S. Route 78
- U.S. Route 278
- Mississippi Highway 6
- Mississippi Highway 9
- Mississippi Highway 15
- Mississippi Highway 41
- Natchez Trace Parkway

=== Adjacent counties ===
- Union County (north)
- Lee County (east)
- Chickasaw County (south)
- Calhoun County (southwest)
- Lafayette County (west)

=== National protected area ===
- Natchez Trace Parkway (part)
- Tombigbee National Forest (part)

== Demographics ==
Historical population
| Census | Pop. | Note | %± |
|---|---|---|---|
| 1840 | 4,491 | | — |
| 1850 | 17,112 | | 281.0% |
| 1860 | 22,113 | | 29.2% |
| 1870 | 12,525 | | −43.4% |
| 1880 | 13,858 | | 10.6% |
| 1890 | 14,940 | | 7.8% |
| 1900 | 18,274 | | 22.3% |
| 1910 | 19,688 | | 7.7% |
| 1920 | 19,962 | | 1.4% |
| 1930 | 22,034 | | 10.4% |
| 1940 | 22,904 | | 3.9% |
| 1950 | 19,994 | | −12.7% |
| 1960 | 17,232 | | −13.8% |
| 1970 | 17,363 | | 0.8% |
| 1980 | 20,918 | | 20.5% |
| 1990 | 22,237 | | 6.3% |
| 2000 | 26,726 | | 20.2% |
| 2010 | 29,957 | | 12.1% |
| 2020 | 31,184 | | 4.1% |
| 2025 (est.) | 32,096 | ▲ | 2.9% |
U.S. Decennial Census; 1790-1960 1900-1990; 1990-2000 2010-2013

=== Racial and ethnic composition ===
Pontotoc County, Mississippi – Racial and ethnic composition Note: the US Census treats Hispanic/Latino as an ethnic category. This table excludes Latinos from the racial categories and assigns them to a separate category. Hispanics/Latinos may be of any race.
| Race / Ethnicity (NH = Non-Hispanic) | Pop 1980 | Pop 1990 | Pop 2000 | Pop 2010 | Pop 2020 | % 1980 | % 1990 | % 2000 | % 2010 | % 2020 |
|---|---|---|---|---|---|---|---|---|---|---|
| White alone (NH) | 17,509 | 18,873 | 22,336 | 23,531 | 23,859 | 83.70% | 84.87% | 83.57% | 78.55% | 76.51% |
| Black or African American alone (NH) | 3,203 | 3,235 | 3,711 | 4,096 | 4,208 | 15.31% | 14.55% | 13.89% | 13.67% | 13.49% |
| Native American or Alaska Native alone (NH) | 2 | 32 | 55 | 47 | 56 | 0.01% | 0.14% | 0.21% | 0.16% | 0.18% |
| Asian alone (NH) | 28 | 32 | 26 | 56 | 55 | 0.13% | 0.14% | 0.10% | 0.19% | 0.18% |
| Native Hawaiian or Pacific Islander alone (NH) | x | x | 1 | 7 | 5 | x | x | 0.00% | 0.02% | 0.02% |
| Other race alone (NH) | 6 | 0 | 3 | 29 | 67 | 0.03% | 0.00% | 0.01% | 0.10% | 0.21% |
| Mixed race or Multiracial (NH) | x | x | 113 | 342 | 886 | x | x | 0.42% | 1.14% | 2.84% |
| Hispanic or Latino (any race) | 170 | 65 | 481 | 1,849 | 2,048 | 0.81% | 0.29% | 1.80% | 6.17% | 6.57% |
| Total | 20,918 | 22,237 | 26,726 | 29,957 | 31,184 | 100.00% | 100.00% | 100.00% | 100.00% | 100.00% |

=== 2020 census ===
As of the 2020 United States census, the county had a population of 31,184. The median age was 38.4 years. 25.3% of residents were under the age of 18 and 16.3% of residents were 65 years of age or older. For every 100 females there were 95.3 males, and for every 100 females age 18 and over there were 92.7 males age 18 and over.

The racial makeup of the county was 77.4% White, 13.6% Black or African American, 0.5% American Indian and Alaska Native, 0.2% Asian, <0.1% Native Hawaiian and Pacific Islander, 4.5% from some other race, and 4.0% from two or more races. Hispanic or Latino residents of any race comprised 6.6% of the population.

<0.1% of residents lived in urban areas, while 100.0% lived in rural areas.

There were 12,042 households in the county, of which 33.4% had children under the age of 18 living in them. Of all households, 49.3% were married-couple households, 18.2% were households with a male householder and no spouse or partner present, and 27.5% were households with a female householder and no spouse or partner present. About 27.9% of all households were made up of individuals and 12.4% had someone living alone who was 65 years of age or older.

There were 13,928 housing units, of which 13.5% were vacant. Among occupied housing units, 72.3% were owner-occupied and 27.7% were renter-occupied. The homeowner vacancy rate was 1.1% and the rental vacancy rate was 23.2%.

=== 2000 census ===
As of the census of 2000, there were 26,726 people, 10,097 households, and 7,562 families residing in the county. The population density was 54 inhabitants per square mile (21/km^{2}). There were 10,816 housing units at an average density of 22 per square mile (8.5/km^{2}). The racial makeup of the county was 84.40% White, 13.98% Black or African American, 0.27% Native American, 0.10% Asian, 0.01% Pacific Islander, 0.71% from other races, and 0.54% from two or more races. 1.80% of the population were Hispanic or Latino of any race.

According to the census of 2000, the largest ancestry groups in Pontotoc County were English 61.92%, Scots-Irish 15.1%, African 13.98% and Scottish 3%

There were 10,097 households, out of which 37.10% had children under the age of 18 living with them, 59.20% were married couples living together, 11.90% had a female householder with no husband present, and 25.10% were non-families. 22.70% of all households were made up of individuals, and 10.40% had someone living alone who was 65 years of age or older. The average household size was 2.62 and the average family size was 3.08.

In the county, the population was spread out, with 27.60% under the age of 18, 8.70% from 18 to 24, 29.50% from 25 to 44, 21.40% from 45 to 64, and 12.80% who were 65 years of age or older. The median age was 35 years. For every 100 females, there were 94.50 males. For every 100 females age 18 and over, there were 90.80 males.

The median income for a household in the county was $32,055, and the median income for a family was $39,845. Males had a median income of $29,074 versus $21,350 for females. The per capita income for the county was $15,658. About 10.20% of families and 13.80% of the population were below the poverty line, including 15.00% of those under age 18 and 23.30% of those age 65 or over.

== Communities ==
=== City ===
- Pontotoc (county seat)

=== Towns ===
- Algoma
- Ecru
- Sherman (partly in Union County and Lee County)
- Thaxton
- Toccopola

=== Census-designated place ===
- Randolph

=== Unincorporated communities ===
- Cherry Creek
- Chiwapa
- Endville
- Esperanza
- Furrs
- Hurricane
- Rough Edge
- Springville
- Troy

== Politics ==
Pontotoc County is a heavily Republican stronghold, having not voted for a Democratic presidential candidate since 1980.

United States presidential election results for Pontotoc County, Mississippi
| Year | Republican | | Democratic | | Third party(ies) | |
| Year | No. | % | No. | % | No. | % |
|---|---|---|---|---|---|---|
| 1912 | 47 | 3.98% | 1,009 | 85.44% | 125 | 10.58% |
| 1916 | 110 | 7.71% | 1,314 | 92.08% | 3 | 0.21% |
| 1920 | 439 | 30.32% | 992 | 68.51% | 17 | 1.17% |
| 1924 | 86 | 6.66% | 1,206 | 93.34% | 0 | 0.00% |
| 1928 | 261 | 14.52% | 1,537 | 85.48% | 0 | 0.00% |
| 1932 | 31 | 1.63% | 1,862 | 98.00% | 7 | 0.37% |
| 1936 | 93 | 3.89% | 2,286 | 95.73% | 9 | 0.38% |
| 1940 | 70 | 3.12% | 2,171 | 96.75% | 3 | 0.13% |
| 1944 | 87 | 4.83% | 1,716 | 95.17% | 0 | 0.00% |
| 1948 | 28 | 1.46% | 348 | 18.17% | 1,539 | 80.37% |
| 1952 | 648 | 22.12% | 2,281 | 77.88% | 0 | 0.00% |
| 1956 | 335 | 11.91% | 2,320 | 82.50% | 157 | 5.58% |
| 1960 | 328 | 12.13% | 1,584 | 58.58% | 792 | 29.29% |
| 1964 | 2,699 | 79.36% | 702 | 20.64% | 0 | 0.00% |
| 1968 | 733 | 11.96% | 599 | 9.77% | 4,798 | 78.27% |
| 1972 | 4,476 | 89.45% | 488 | 9.75% | 40 | 0.80% |
| 1976 | 2,245 | 34.59% | 4,066 | 62.64% | 180 | 2.77% |
| 1980 | 3,198 | 40.99% | 4,499 | 57.66% | 105 | 1.35% |
| 1984 | 5,182 | 67.80% | 2,434 | 31.85% | 27 | 0.35% |
| 1988 | 4,939 | 63.81% | 2,772 | 35.81% | 29 | 0.37% |
| 1992 | 4,595 | 54.92% | 2,965 | 35.44% | 806 | 9.63% |
| 1996 | 4,289 | 55.64% | 2,597 | 33.69% | 823 | 10.68% |
| 2000 | 6,601 | 69.41% | 2,771 | 29.14% | 138 | 1.45% |
| 2004 | 8,480 | 75.44% | 2,660 | 23.67% | 100 | 0.89% |
| 2008 | 9,727 | 75.59% | 2,982 | 23.17% | 159 | 1.24% |
| 2012 | 9,448 | 76.13% | 2,804 | 22.59% | 159 | 1.28% |
| 2016 | 10,336 | 79.61% | 2,386 | 18.38% | 262 | 2.02% |
| 2020 | 11,550 | 80.43% | 2,614 | 18.20% | 197 | 1.37% |
| 2024 | 11,740 | 83.45% | 2,214 | 15.74% | 114 | 0.81% |

== Education ==
There are two school districts: Pontotoc County Schools and Pontotoc City Schools.

== See also ==
- Dry counties
- List of counties in Mississippi
- National Register of Historic Places listings in Pontotoc County, Mississippi
