= U.S. Route 278 =

Highway in the United States

U.S. Route 278
- US 278 highlighted in red

Route information
- Auxiliary route of US 78
- Length: 1,074 mi (1,728 km)
- Existed: 1952–present

Major junctions
- West end: US 59 / US 71 in Wickes, AR
- I-30 in Hope, AR; I-55 in Batesville, MS; I-22 in Hamilton, AL; I-65 in Cullman, AL; I-59 in Gadsden, AL; I-285 near Atlanta, GA (twice); I-75 / I-85 in Atlanta, GA; I-20 in various locations; I-520 in Augusta, GA and North Augusta, SC; I-95 in Hardeeville, SC
- East end: US 278 Bus. on Hilton Head Island, SC

Location
- Country: United States
- States: Arkansas, Mississippi, Alabama, Georgia, South Carolina

Highway system
- United States Numbered Highway System; List; Special; Divided

U.S. Route 278 (US 278) is a parallel route of US 78. It currently runs for 1,074 miles (1,728 km) from US 71/US 59 in Wickes, Arkansas to Hilton Head Island, South Carolina, passing through five states in the process. Landmarks along its route include the Department of Energy's Savannah River Site in South Carolina and the Tennessee-Tombigbee Waterway in eastern Mississippi. There are several universities located along the highway including the Georgia Institute of Technology, the University of Mississippi, Delta State University, and the University of Arkansas at Monticello.

== Route description ==
=== Arkansas ===
US 278 begins at an intersection with US 59/US 71 in the town of Wickes in southwestern Arkansas. From Wickes, US 278 continues eastward near Gillham Lake to an overlap with US 70 through Dierks. Continuing south, US 278 overlaps Highway 26 for 0.09 miles (0.14 km) at Center Point. Further south the route continues into Nashville. The route overlaps US 371 and later Highway 27 upon entering Nashville.

Entering Hempstead County, the highway winds through rural areas to Ozan and Washington, before meeting US 278 Business (US 278B) outside Hope. The highway crosses over Interstate 30 (I-30) shortly after entering the city limits and overlaps Highway 29 and Highway 32. US 278/AR 29/AR 32 intersect US 67 in east Hope. South of this junction AR 29 splits and US 278/AR 32 continues southeast. Further along this route, AR 32 turns southeast to Willisville and US 278 runs toward Camden.

The route intersects Highway 53 in rural Nevada County, overlaps US 371 in Rosston, and has a junction with Highway 57 upon entering Ouachita County. In Camden, US 278 intersects Highway 24 before it meets US 278B and US 79B prior to overlapping US 79. US 278 breaks from US 79 near Harrell Field shortly before entering East Camden. US 278 continues into Calhoun County and Hampton and a junction with US 371. The east edge of town brings an intersection with Highway 274 as US 278 continues to Harrell and Highway 160 before entering Bradley County. Aside from Banks, where US 278 has a junction with Highway 275, the route runs through rural country until Warren, where US 278 almost entirely bypasses the city to the south while US 278B runs downtown, including a brief overlap with US 63B. US 278 has an intersection with US 63/AR 8 along the southern edge of Warren before serving as the eastern terminus for US 278B. Further east the highway intersects Highway 172, which gives access to the Warren Prairie Natural Area just east of the Drew County line.

The route continues to Monticello to McGehee, where it meets US 65. US 278 overlaps US 65 southward for 16 miles (26 km) until they separate in Lake Village. There, US 65 splits off and US 278 overlaps US 82 east to the Mississippi River, where US 82/US 278 crosses into Mississippi.

Long-term plans are to move US 278 to the Charles W. Dean Bridge, which is part of the proposed extension of I-69.

=== Mississippi ===
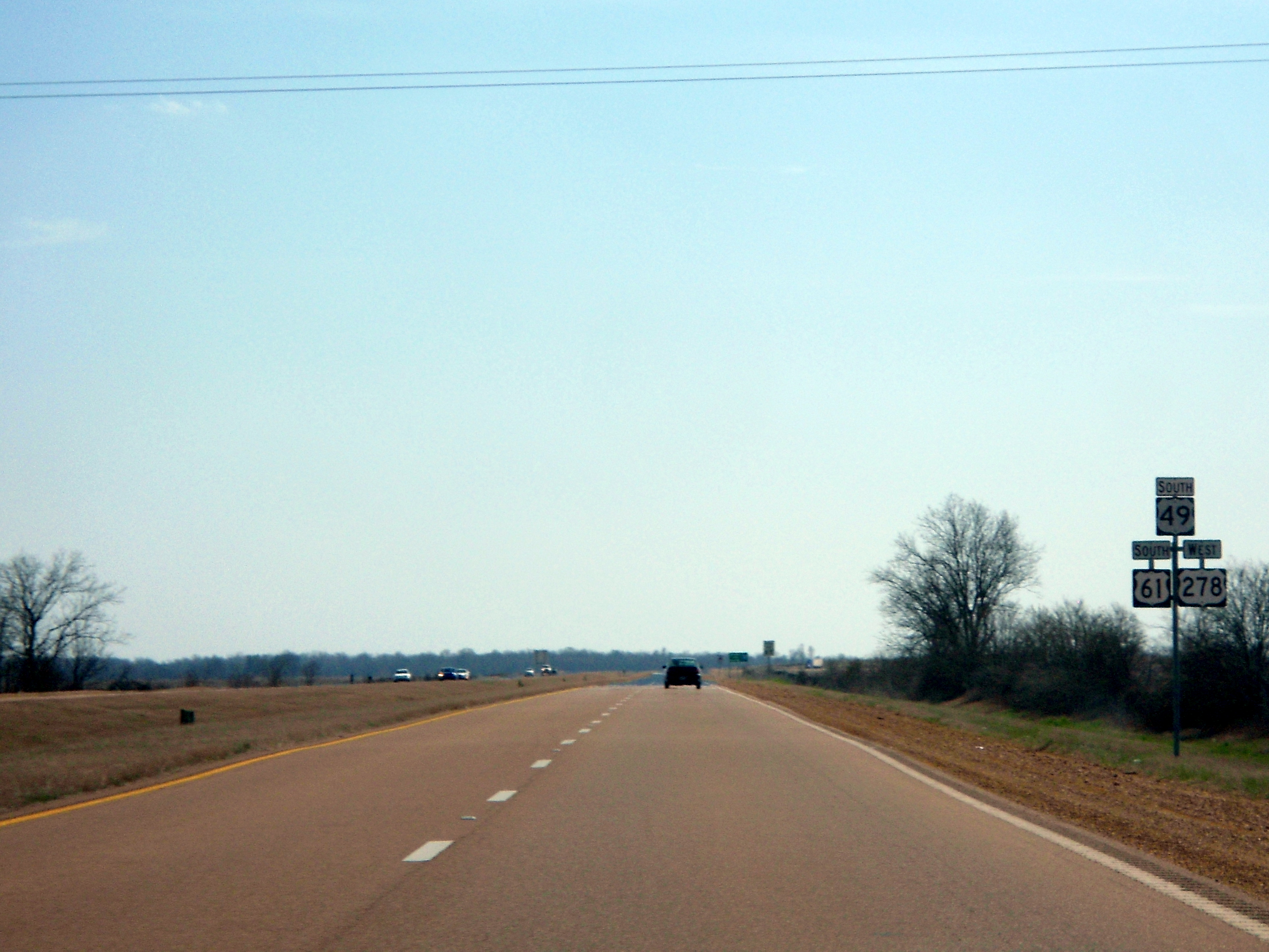
US 49 and US 61 run with US 278 near Clarksdale, MS

US 82/US 278 goes through Greenville to Leland, where US 278 separates from US 82 at US 61. US 278 then joins US 61 northward through Cleveland before splitting in Clarksdale. East of Clarksdale, it overlaps Mississippi Highway 6 through Batesville, Oxford, and Pontotoc before reaching Tupelo. At Tupelo, MS 6 separates from US 278 while US 278 overlaps US 45 south to New Wren. From New Wren, US 278 continues east through Amory before entering Alabama in the village of Gattman.

=== Alabama ===
US 278 enters Alabama between Greenwood Springs, Mississippi, and Sulligent, Alabama. As in Georgia, this and all U.S routes are partnered with state routes; however, there are few instances throughout the state where the state route number is posted. From the Mississippi state line to Guin, US 278 is paired with State Route 118. From Hamilton to the Georgia state line, US 278 is paired with State Route 74.

US 278 junctions with US 431 at Gadsden. The two routes overlap until they split at Attalla. US 278 overlaps US 43 between Hamilton and Guin. Prior to the completion of Corridor X (Future I-22), these two routes also overlapped US 78 between these two towns; eastbound US 78 traveled in the same direction as westbound US 278.

=== Georgia ===
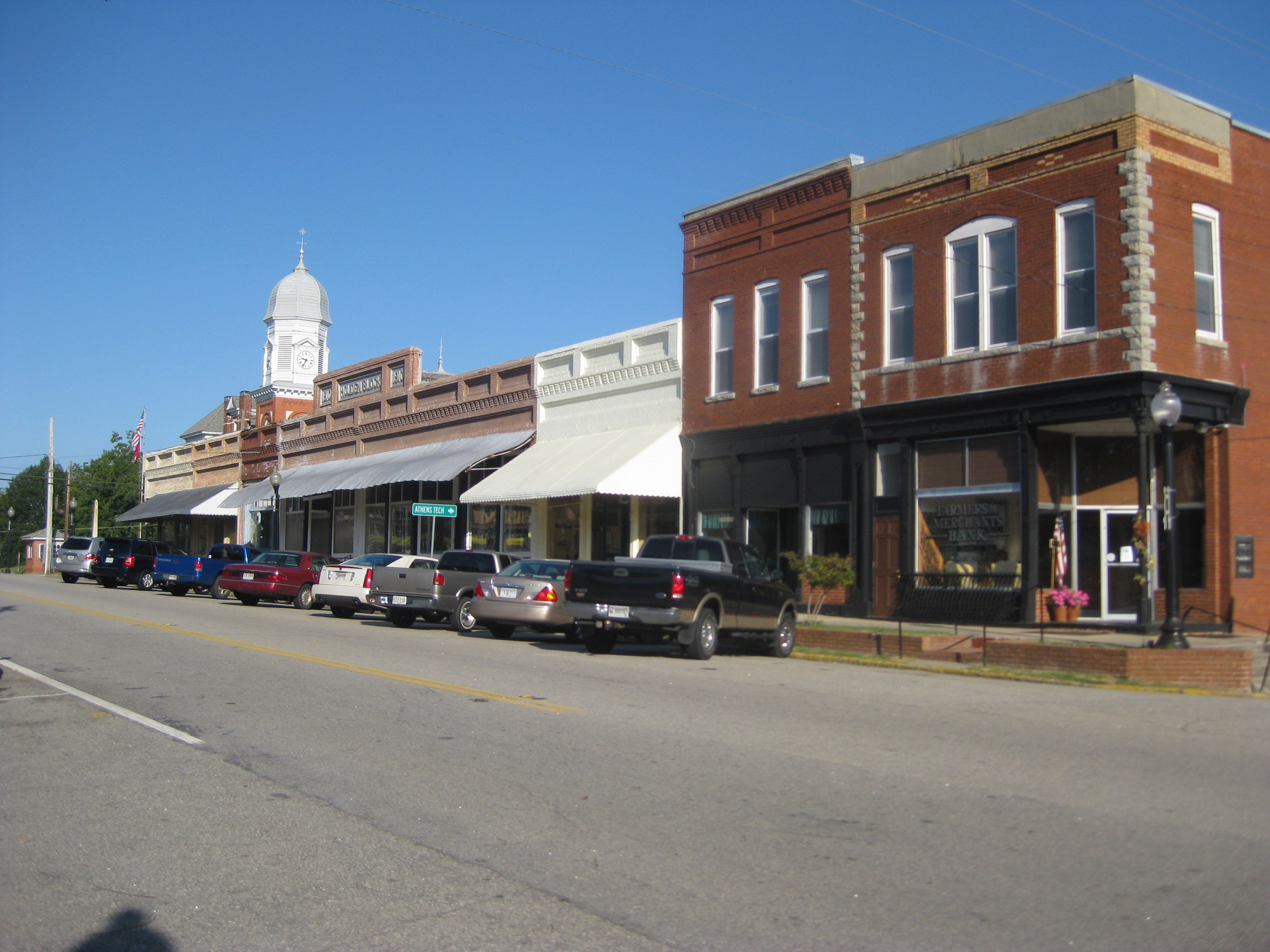
U.S. Route 278 (and S.R. 12) in downtown Crawfordville, GA.

In Atlanta, US 278 runs along Donald Lee Hollowell Parkway (Bankhead Highway), North Avenue, briefly along Piedmont Road and Ponce de Leon Avenue. Outside the Perimeter, US 278 runs along Covington Highway. In Lithonia, Georgia, at the intersection with Turner Hill Road (SR 124), US 278 merges with I-20 for 15 miles (24 km). It leaves I-20 at exit 90, in Covington, Georgia.

US 278 is co-signed with a state route for its entire length in Georgia, as are all U.S. Highways in the state. From the Alabama line into Lithia Springs, it is co-signed with SR 6. From Lithia Springs through Atlanta, it is merged with US 78/SR 8. In Atlanta, US 278 merges further with other highways including SR 10 and US 23 before splitting off at Ponce de Leon Ave. and East Lake Road near Decatur. In Avondale Estates, SR 12 is paired with US 278, all the way into Thomson. There, US 278 merges with US 78/SR 10 to the South Carolina line.

=== South Carolina ===
After crossing the Savannah River, US 278 bypasses North Augusta, South Carolina, en route to Beech Island and Johnson Crossroads. It then winds through a corner of the Savannah River Site. The route then continues onward through the towns of Allendale, Fairfax, Hampton, Varnville, Ridgeland, and Hardeeville where it meets I-95. US 278 shares the route between Ridgeland and Hardeeville with US 17.

Upon reaching Hardeeville, the route heads eastward toward the Atlantic with major new developments lining the spine of the road from Hardeeville through Sun City and Bluffton before crossing over the bridge to Hilton Head Island. US 278 ends at US 278 Business on the southern portion of Hilton Head Island, just outside Sea Pines Plantation.

== History ==
In 1954, US 278 was extended from Guin, Alabama, to Augusta, Georgia. The extension was routed along US 43 from Guin to Hamilton, Alabama, then over SR 74 to the Georgia state line. In Georgia, US 278 was routed over SR 6 to Atlanta and SR 12 to Augusta. A further extension from Augusta to Jacksonboro, South Carolina, in 1955 was denied by AASHO.

In 1989, US 278 was rerouted through Dallas, Georgia; the former route through town was redesignated US 278 Byp. AASHTO approved another relocation through Rockmart, Georgia, in 1990; the former route through town became US 278 Bus. A third relocation the following year in Cedartown, Georgia, was also approved.

Alabama rerouted a section of US 278 in Guin over a section of SR 118 in 1995. At the same time, South Carolina rerouted the highway in Ridgeland over US 17 and SC 88.

Mississippi and Arkansas extended US 278 westward in 1997 from US 45 in Nettleton, Mississippi, to US 71 in Wickes, Arkansas. The following year, the highway was relocated on Hilton Head Island, South Carolina; the former routing became US 278 Bus.

Alabama relocated US 278 in Gadsden in 2000. Until early 2005, US 278 was only signed in Mississippi from the Alabama state line to US 45 west of Amory. US 278 in western Alabama was formerly routed through Haleyville via current SR 195 and SR 129. In 2014, Alabama relocated US 278 in Cullman.

== Major intersections ==
Arkansas
US 59 / US 71 in Wickes
US 70 north-northeast of Dierks. The highways travel concurrently to Dierks.
US 371 west of Nashville. The highways travel concurrently to Nashville.
I-30 in Hope
US 67 in Hope
US 371 in Rosston. The highways travel concurrently through Rosston.
US 79 in Camden. The highways travel concurrently to west-northwest of East Camden.
US 167 in Hampton
US 63 in Warren
Future I-69 east of Warren
US 425 in Monticello
Future I-69 west of Monticello
Future I-69 northwest of McGehee. The highways will travel concurrently to Clarksdale, Mississippi.
US 65 / US 165 in McGehee. US 65/US 278 travels concurrently to south-southeast of Lake Village. US 165/US 278 travels concurrently to Dermott.
US 82 in Lake Village. The highways travel concurrently to east of Leland, Mississippi.
Mississippi
US 61 / US 82 east of Leland. US 61/US 278 travels concurrently to Clarksdale.
US 49 in Clarksdale. The highways travel concurrently through Clarksdale.
Future I-69 in Clarksdale
US 51 in Batesville
I-55 in Batesville
US 45 on the Verona–Tupelo city line. The highways travel concurrently to north-northwest of New Wren.
Alabama
US 43 in Guin. The highways travel concurrently to Hamilton.
I-22 / US 78 in Hamilton
I-65 in Cullman
US 31 in Cullman
US 231 south-southwest of Summit
US 431 northwest of Attalla. The highways travel concurrently to Gadsden.
US 11 in Attalla. The highways travel concurrently through Attalla.
I-59 in Attalla
US 411 in Gadsden
Georgia
US 27 in Cedartown. The highways travel concurrently through Cedartown.
US 78 in Lithia Springs. The highways travel concurrently to Druid Hills.
I-285 in Atlanta
US 19 / US 41 in Atlanta. The highways travel concurrently through Atlanta.
US 19 / US 29 / US 41 in Atlanta. US 29/US 278 travels concurrently to Druid Hills.
US 23 in Atlanta. The highways travel concurrently to Druid Hills.
I-285 in Belvedere Park
I-20 southeast of Lithonia. The highways travel concurrently to Covington.
I-20 south of Social Circle
US 129 / US 441 in Madison. The highways travel concurrently to northeast of Madison.
I-20 in Barnett
US 78 southeast of Thomson. The highways travel concurrently to Clearwater, South Carolina.
US 221 in Harlem
I-520 in Augusta
US 1 in Augusta. The highways travel concurrently to Clearwater, South Carolina.
US 25 in Augusta. The highways travel concurrently to North Augusta, South Carolina.
South Carolina
I-520 in North Augusta
US 301 in Allendale. The highways travel concurrently through Allendale.
US 321 in Fairfax
US 601 in Hampton. The highways travel concurrently through Hampton.
US 17 in Ridgeland. The highways travel concurrently to Hardeeville.
I-95 in Hardeeville
US 278 Bus. on Hilton Head Island.

== See also ==
- U.S. Route 78
- Special routes of U.S. Route 278
