= Mississippi Highway 8 =

State Highway in Mississippi

Mississippi Highway 8
- MS 8 in red, unsigned but designated portion of MS 8 in Aberdeen in blue

Route information
- Maintained by MDOT
- Length: 168.1 mi (270.5 km) (160.932 mi excluding concurrencies)
- Existed: 1932–present

Major junctions
- West end: MS 1 in Rosedale
- US 61 / US 278 in Cleveland; US 49W in Ruleville; US 49E in Minter City; I-55 in Grenada; US 51 in Grenada; US 45 Alt. in Gibson; US 45 in Aberdeen
- East end: US 278 in Wise Gap

Location
- Country: United States
- State: Mississippi
- Counties: Bolivar, Sunflower, Leflore, Tallahatchie, Grenada, Calhoun, Chickasaw, Monroe

Highway system
- Mississippi State Highway System; Interstate; US; State
← MS 7	→ MS 9

Mississippi Highway 8 (MS 8) is an east–west state highway in northern Mississippi, running 168.1 miles (270.5 km) from MS 1 in Rosedale to U.S. Route 278 (US 278) northeast of Aberdeen. Points of interest along the route include Great River Road State Park, Delta State University, Grenada Lake, Hugh White State Park, and the Natchez Trace Parkway.

== Route description ==
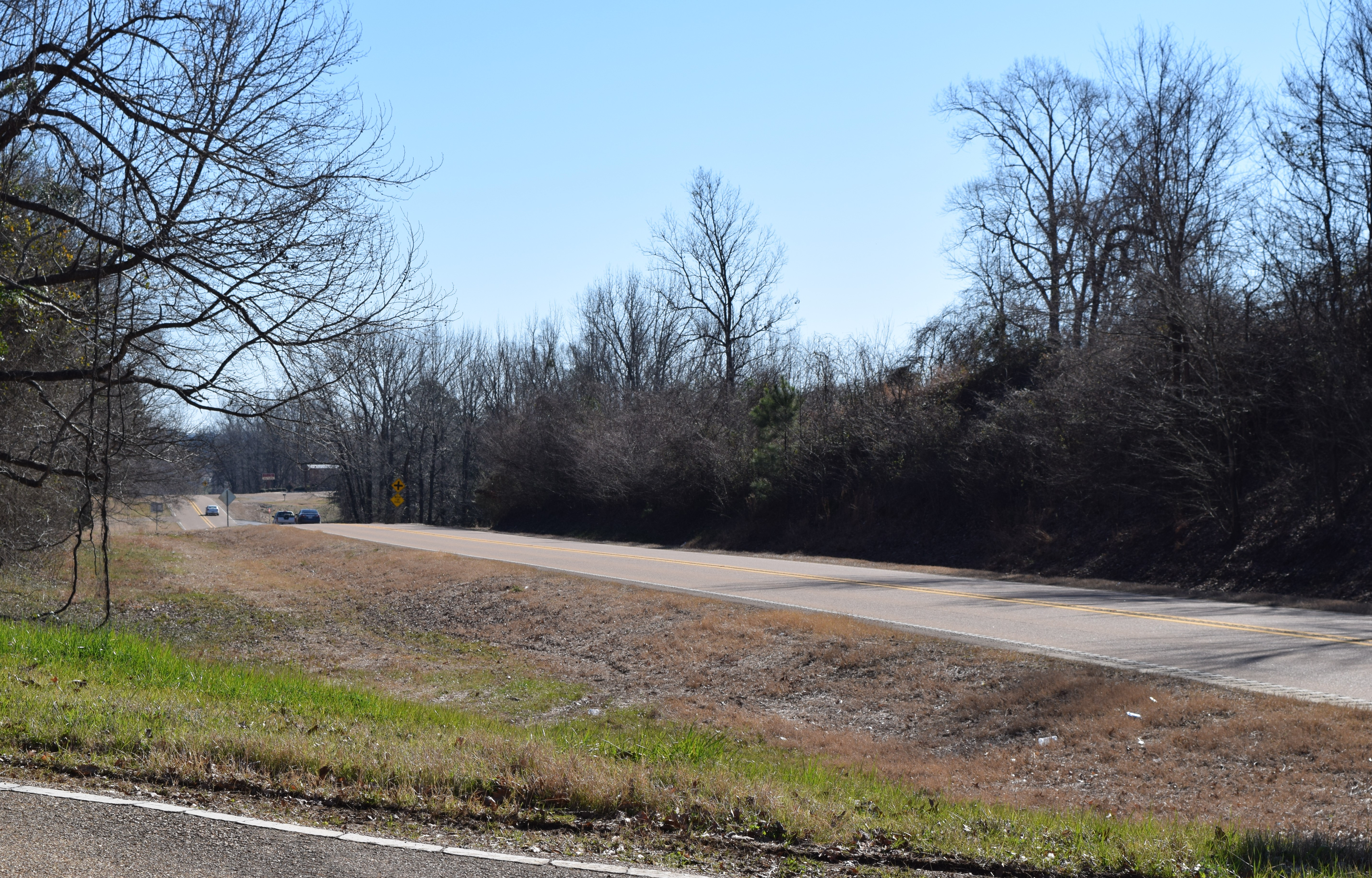
Highway 8 in Grenada County

MS 8 begins in the Mississippi Delta region in Bolivar County at an intersection with MS 1 (which is part of the Great River Road) in Rosedale, just south of downtown, directly across the street from Great River Road State Park, and only two miles west of the banks of the mighty Mississippi River. MS 8 heads east as a two-lane highway to leave Rosedale and pass through farmland for several miles, where it passes just to the south of Malvina, and just to the north of Mound City. It crosses Bogue Phalia as it travels through Pace, where it has an intersection with MS 817, before continuing east for several miles to enter Cleveland. The highway passes by Delta State University as it travels through neighborhoods along W Sunflower Road. MS 8 now enters downtown and comes to an intersection with US 61/US 278 (Davis Avenue). The highway now widens to a four-lane undivided highway and passes through more neighborhoods along E Sunflower Road before leaving Cleveland, widening to a divided highway, and heading southeast to cross into Sunflower County.

MS 8 now curves to the east as it passes through Dockery, where it travels past the Dockery Plantation and crosses the Sunflower River, and Ruleville, where it narrows to two-lanes and has an intersection with US 49W (unsigned MS 3). The highway now crosses the Quiver River before entering Leflore County.

MS 8 continues east through farmland to pass through Minter City, where it has an intersection with US 49E and crosses an Oxbow of the Tallahatchie River, before entering Tallahatchie County. The highway now crosses the Tallahatchie and travels through Philipp and the Tallahatchie National Wildlife Refuge, where it passes through Wetlands and crosses another former alignment of the Tallahatchie, to enter Grenada County.

MS 8 travels through Oxberry, where it becomes concurrent with MS 35, and they now climb into the North Central Hills region as they cross the Yalobusha River. The highway now travels through Holcomb, which MS 8 bypasses town on its north side as it splits from MS 35 and follows MS 7 towards Grenada. MS 7/MS 8 follow along the south bank of the Yalobusha for several to enter Grenada, where they widen to a four-lane undivided boulevard and pass through an industrial area. The highway now comes to an interchange with I-55 (Exit 206), which MS 7 splits off and follows north, and MS 8 heads southeast into central Grenada, passing through a business district and neighborhoods to come to an intersection with US 51 (Commerce Street/Dr. Martin Luther King Jr. Boulevard). MS 8 now crosses Batupan Bogue into the Futheyville neighborhood, where it has an intersection with MS 333 Scenic (which provides access to Grenada Lake and Grenada Dam) and Old Highway 8 (which provides access to Hugh White State Park). The highway narrows to two-lanes and leaves Grenada to pass along the south shore of Grenada Lake for several miles to pass through Gore Springs, where it has an intersection with former MS 335 (Graysport Crossing Road). It crosses into Calhoun County.

MS 8 passes through Sabougla, bypassing Dentontown just to the north, to have a Y-Intersection and become concurrent with MS 9 and they immediately head northeast to cross Topashaw Creek. The highway then crosses the Yalobusha for the final time to enter Calhoun City, where MS 8 splits off to pass through Derma at a traffic circle in downtown (which is also where it meets the other end of Old Highway 8 (Veterans Avenue), which leads to the village of Big Creek). MS 8 heads east to pass straight through downtown Derma before leaving the Calhoun City-Derma area and passing northeast through farmland for several miles. It now passes through Vardaman, where it has an intersection with MS 341, before entering Chickasaw County.

MS 8 passes through Pyland before having an interchange with MS 15 and passing straight through downtown Houston, where it has an intersection with MS 389. The highway now leaves Houston and jogs southeast for a few miles to have an interchange with the Natchez Trace Parkway. MS 8 turns east again and passes through Trebloc, where it has an intersection with MS 47, before passing through a wooded as it crosses Tibbee Creek. The roadway enters Monroe County shortly thereafter.

MS 8 immediately has an interchange with US 45 Alternate before heading east to pass through Gibson before entering Aberdeen at an interchange with US 45. MS 8 becomes concurrent with four-lane US 45, bypassing downtown along its western and southern sides, while becoming concurrent with MS 25 and having an intersection with MS 145. US 45/MS 8/MS 25 now cross the Tombigbee River (Tennessee Tombigbee Waterway) to leave Aberdeen and MS 8/MS 25 split from US 45 immediately thereafter at an interchange just north of Lackey, with MS 8 splitting off on its own not to far after. MS 8 passes northeast through farmland for a few miles before entering the wooded Appalachian Foothills, bypassing Athens to the south before coming to an end at an intersection with US 278 (former MS 6) at the community of Wise Gap, near the Alabama state line.

== History ==
Prior to the construction of Grenada Dam, which created Grenada Lake, in 1954, MS 8 ran farther north than it does today between Grenada and Calhoun City. It split off the current alignment at Futheyville at the intersection with MS 333 Scenic, headed east to pass through what is now Hugh White State Park, and followed the Yalobusha River to pass through Big Creek before entering downtown Calhoun City along Veterans Avenue. The majority of this route is now underwater, though some sections of the highway can be seen at low tide.

== Major intersections ==
County	Location	mi	km	Destinations	Notes
Bolivar	Rosedale	0.0	0.0	MS 1 / Great River Road (Main Street) – Greenville, Clarksdale; State Park Road - Great River Road State Park	Western terminus; access road into park
Bolivar		6.2	10.0	Malvina Road - Malvina	
Bolivar	Pace	9.5	15.3	Symonds Road - Symonds	
Bolivar	Pace	10.7	17.2	MS 817 south (Jenny Washington Street) – Pace	Northern terminus of MS 817
Bolivar		14.6	23.5	Shaw-Skene Road - Skene, Shaw	
Bolivar	Cleveland	19.5	31.4	US 61 / US 278 (Davis Avenue) – Clarksdale, Leland	
Sunflower	Ruleville	29.5	47.5	US 49W (MS 3) – Drew, Indianola	
Leflore	Minter City	43.1	69.4	US 49E – Clarksdale, Greenwood	
Tallahatchie	Philipp	51.6	83.0	Tippo Road – Macel, Tippo, Effie, Cowart	Former MS 325
Grenada	Oxberry	60.0	96.6	MS 35 north – Charleston	West end of MS 35 overlap
Grenada	Holcomb	63.7	102.5	MS 7 south – Greenwood	West end of MS 7 overlap
Grenada	Holcomb	63.9	102.8	MS 35 south – Carrollton	East end of MS 35 overlap
Grenada	Grenada	71.7– 72.0	115.4– 115.9	I-55 / MS 7 north – Grenada, Jackson MS 333 Scenic begins	East end of MS 7 overlap; I-55 exit 206; southern terminus of MS 333 Scenic; west end of MS 333 Scenic overlap
Grenada	Grenada	74.2	119.4	US 51 (Commerce Street) – Duck Hill, Downtown Grenada, Airport	
Grenada	Grenada	76.4	123.0	MS 333 Scenic north (MS 333 north/Old Highway 8) – North Grenada Lake, Grenada Dam, State Park	East end of MS 333 Scenic overlap; southern terminus of unsigned MS 333; former MS 8 east
Calhoun		102.9	165.6	MS 9 south – Slate Springs, Eupora	West end of MS 9 overlap
Calhoun	Calhoun City	106.5	171.4	MS 9 north (Main Street) – Pittsboro, Bruce, Oxford; Veterans Avenue - Big Creek	East end of MS 9 overlap; traffic circle around city park; Veterans Avenue is Old MS 8 west
Calhoun	Vardaman	114.0	183.5	MS 341 (Main Street) – Atlanta	
Chickasaw	Houston	122.2– 122.5	196.7– 197.1	MS 15 – Pontotoc, Ackerman	Interchange
Chickasaw	Houston	124.3	200.0	MS 389 south (S Jackson Street) – Starkville	Northern terminus of MS 389
Chickasaw		128.3	206.5	Natchez Trace Parkway	Interchange
Chickasaw	Trebloc	135.9	218.7	MS 47 – Buena Vista, McCondy	
Monroe		142.6– 142.9	229.5– 230.0	US 45 Alt. – Okolona, West Point	Interchange
Monroe	Aberdeen	149.5	240.6	US 45 north – Tupelo	Interchange; west end of US 45 overlap
Monroe	Aberdeen	152.1	244.8	MS 25 south – West Point	West end of MS 25 overlap
Monroe	Aberdeen	154.3	248.3	MS 145 north (E Commerce Street) – Aberdeen	Southern terminus of MS 145
Monroe	Aberdeen	156.2	251.4	US 45 south – Columbus	Interchange; east end of US 45 overlap
Monroe		157.8	254.0	MS 25 north – Amory	East end of MS 25 overlap
Monroe	Wise Gap	168.1	270.5	US 278 – Amory, Gattman, Sulligent	Eastern terminus
1.000 mi = 1.609 km; 1.000 km = 0.621 mi: Concurrency terminus
