= Mississippi Highway 333 =

State Highway in Mississippi

Mississippi Highway 333 Scenic
- MS 333 Scenic in red, official designated segment of MS 333 in blue

Route information
- Maintained by MDOT
- Length: 17.206 mi (27.690 km)
- Existed: 1958–present

Major junctions
- South end: I-55 / MS 7 / MS 8 in Grenada
- US 51 in Grenada; MS 8 in Grenada; MS 7 near Grenada; I-55 near Grenada
- North end: US 51 near Grenada

Location
- Country: United States
- State: Mississippi

Highway system
- Mississippi State Highway System; Interstate; US; State
| ← MS 332 | → MS 334 |

Mississippi Highway 333 (MS 333), signed as Mississippi Highway 333 Scenic (MS 333 Scenic), is a 17.2-mile-long (27.7 km) north-south state highway located entirely in Grenada County, Mississippi. It connects Grenada Dam and Hugh White State Park with the city of Grenada and Interstate 55 (I-55).

Mainline MS 333 covers only the portion of the highway between MS 8 to Old Highway 8 (near Hugh White State Park). The MS 333 Scenic designation covers the entire route, entirely overlapping its parent route, with this being the only instance in Mississippi where a scenic route not only overlaps the entire length of its parent route, but its parent route also being entirely unsigned.

== Route description ==
Mississippi Highway 333
- Location: Grenada County
- Length: 0.454 mi (731 m)
- Existed: 1958–present

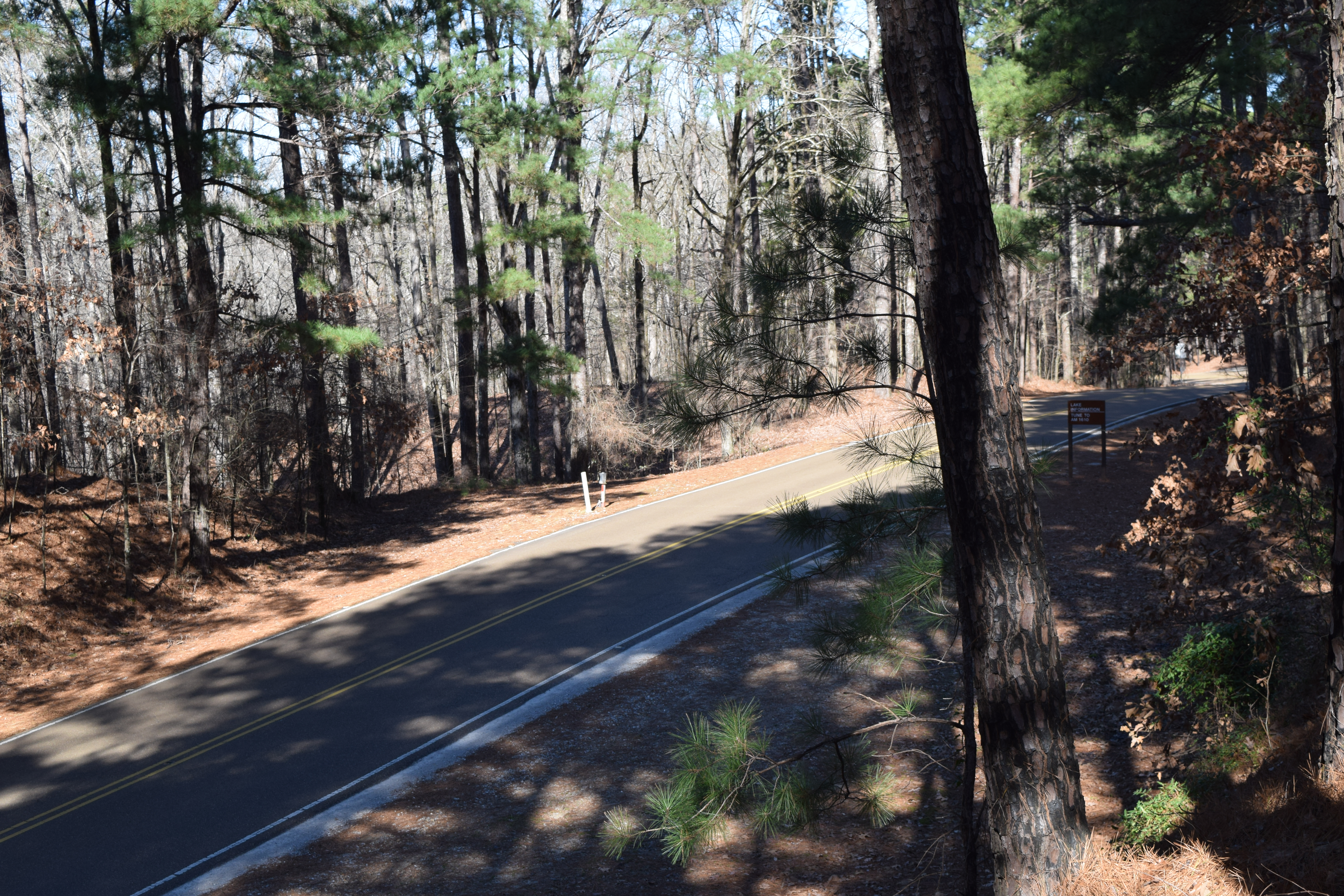
MS 333 Scenic passing by a Civil War era Confederate fort just south of Grenada Dam

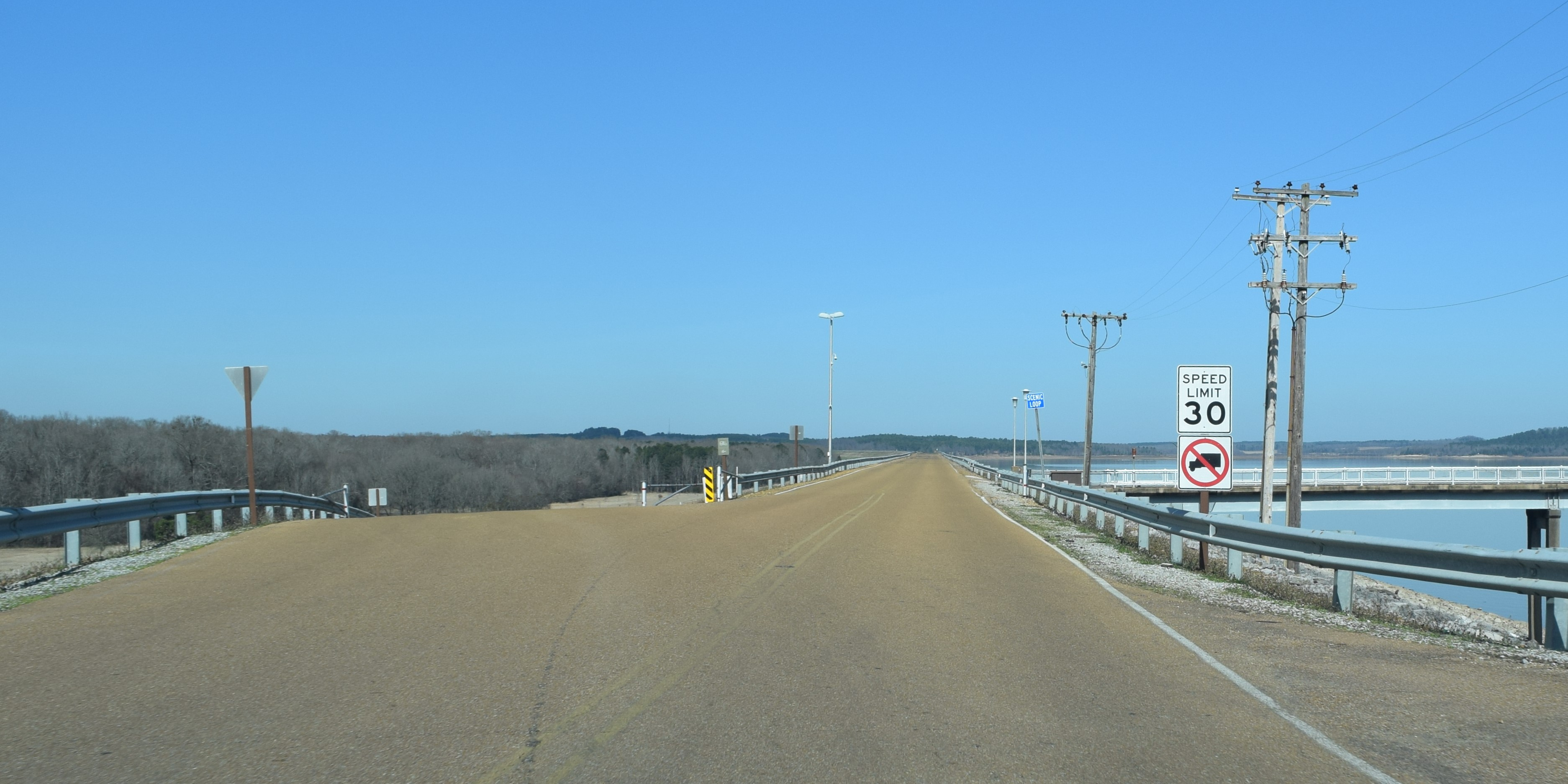
MS 333 Scenic northbound atop Grenada Dam

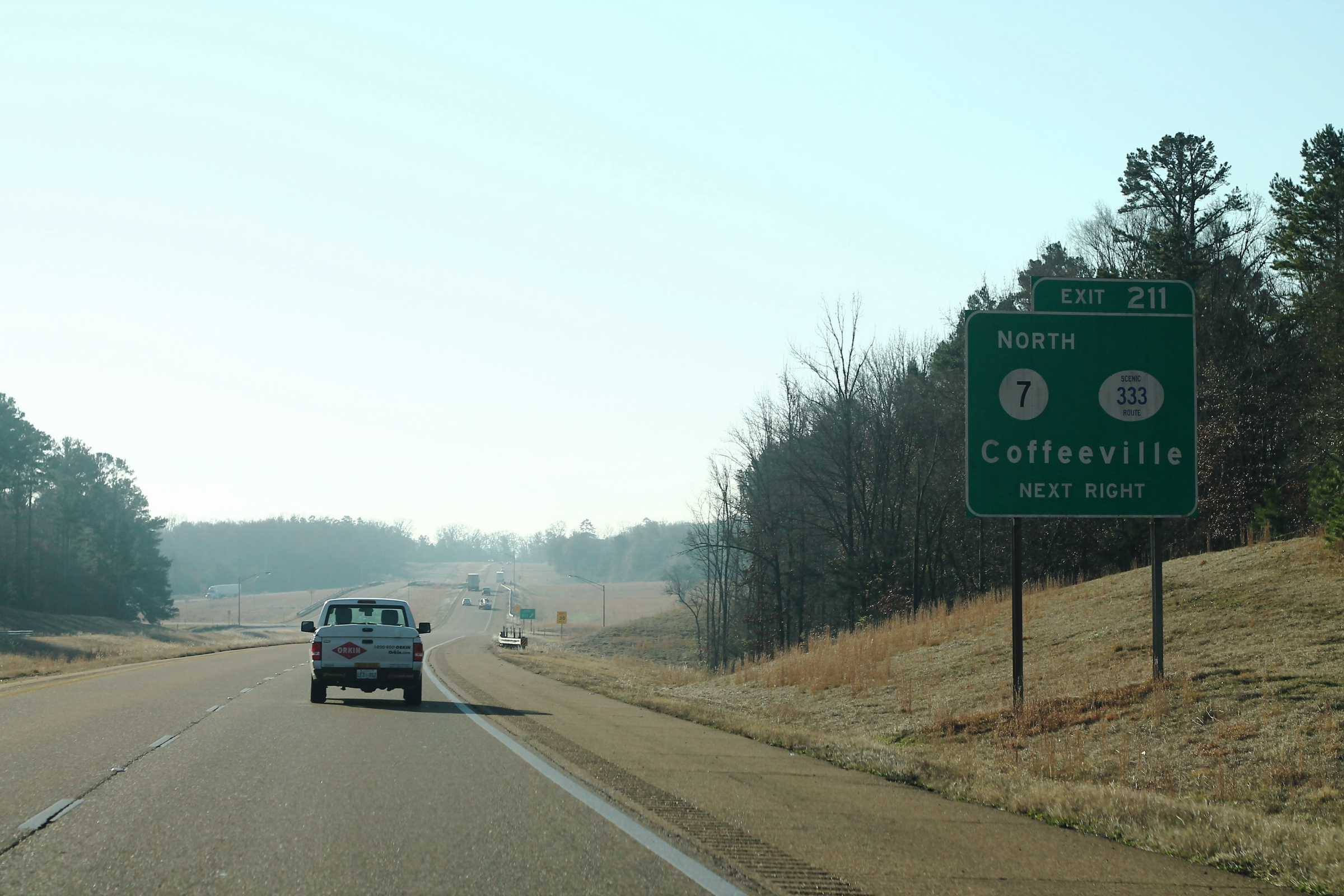
I-55 southbound at exit 211

MS 333 Scenic begins in the city of Grenada at an interchange with Interstate 55 (I-55)/MS 7 (exit 206). It heads southeast, concurrent with MS 8, as a four-lane divided highway through a major business district, where it has an intersection with South Street, before narrowing to an undivided highway to curve eastward and pass through neighborhoods. The highway has an intersection with U.S. Route 51 (US 51) before traveling along the southern side of downtown for several blocks to cross a bridge over Batupan Bogue. They now pass through the neighborhood of Futheyville, where MS 333 Scenic splits off and heads north as a two-lane road. Here, this is the officially designated section of MS 333. It almost immediately has an intersection with Old Highway 8 (which provides access to nearby Hugh White State Park) where MS 333 ends, and MS 333 Scenic leaves the Grenada city limits winding its way north through some hilly woodlands for a few miles (passing by a civil war era confederate fort) to cross the dam's spillway (inadvertently also crossing the Yalobusha River) before having its first intersection with Toe Road (provides access to MS 332) before passing directly over top of Grenada Dam. The highway has another intersection with Toe Road as it passes by the North Abutment Campground before leaving the dam area and winding its way through hilly, wooded terrain for the next several miles. MS 333 Scenic comes to an intersection with MS 7, which lies not even 500 feet from the Yalobusha County, and they head southwest through farmland for several miles to have another interchange with I-55 (exit 211) just south of the community of Hardy. MS 333 Scenic ends here, MS 7 splits off to head south along I-555, and the road ahead is unsigned MS 729 which travels for 0.3 miles (0.48 km) to come to an end at an intersection with US 51.

== History ==
MS 333 Scenic originated in 1958 as MS 333, a new highway to connect MS 7 and MS 8, as well as the city of Grenada and surrounding areas, with the then new constructed Grenada Dam, built in 1954. It also served as a replacement for a nearby highway that was flooded out due to the newly formed lake, Mississippi Highway 335 (MS 335). When Scenic routes were being designated across northern Mississippi in the 1960s, MS 333 was resigned entirely as MS 333 Scenic (though the designation is still technically active). The highway is still referred to by locals as simply Highway 333.

== Major intersections ==
The entire route is in Grenada County.

| Location | mi | km | Destinations | Notes |
|---|---|---|---|---|
| Grenada | 0.000 | 0.000 | I-55 / MS 7 north – Jackson, Memphis MS 7 south (Sunset Drive) / MS 8 west – Greenwood, Cleveland, Holcomb | Southern end of MS 8 concurrency; southern terminus; I-55 exit 206 |
| Grenada | 2.185 | 3.516 | US 51 (Dr. Martin Luther King Jr. Boulevard/Commerce Street) – Duck Hill, Tillatoba, Oakland | |
| Grenada | 4.370 | 7.033 | MS 8 east – Calhoun City; MS 333 begins | Northern end of MS 8 concurrency; southern terminus of unsigned mainline MS 333 |
| Grenada | 4.824 | 7.763 | Old Highway 8 – Hugh White State Park; MS 333 ends | Former MS 8 east; access road into park; northern terminus of unsigned mainline MS 333 |
| | 6.588 | 10.602 | Toe Road to MS 332 – Grenada Municipal Airport, Grenada, Outlet Channel Campground | Access road to MS 332 |
| | 9.141 | 14.711 | Toe Road to MS 332 – Grenada Municipal Airport, Grenada, Outlet Channel Campground | Access road to MS 332 |
| | 13.000 | 20.921 | MS 7 north – Coffeeville, Water Valley, Oxford | Southern end of wrong-way MS 7 concurrency |
| | 16.505– 17.206 | 26.562– 27.690 | I-55 / MS 7 south – Grenada, Memphis MS 729 begins | Northern end of wrong-way MS 7 concurrency; I-55 exit 211; western terminus of unsigned MS 729 |
1.000 mi = 1.609 km; 1.000 km = 0.621 mi: Concurrency terminus
