= Mississippi Highway 330 =

Highway in Mississippi

Mississippi Highway 330

Route information
- Maintained by MDOT
- Length: 33.271 mi (53.544 km)
- Existed: 1950–present

Major junctions
- West end: US 51 near Tillatoba
- I-55 near Tillatoba
- East end: MS 32 near Bruce

Location
- Country: United States
- State: Mississippi
- Counties: Yalobusha, Calhoun

Highway system
- Mississippi State Highway System; Interstate; US; State
| ← MS 328 | → MS 331 |

Mississippi Highway 330 (MS 330) is a 33.271-mile-long (53.544 km) east-west state highway in the North Central Hills region of northern Mississippi, connecting U.S. Route 51 (US 51) just outside of Tillatoba to MS 32 west of Bruce, Mississippi. It is generally a two-lane road.

Along its way, the highway intersects Interstate 55 (I-55) east of Tillatoba and MS 7 in Coffeeville.

== Route description ==
MS 330 begins in Yalobusha County at an intersection with US 51 on the western outskirts of Tillatoba. It heads east to pass directly through the center of the small town, where it makes an odd sharp left turn before crossing a railroad track, only to leave Tillatoba shortly thereafter at an interchange with I-55 (Exit 220). The highway now winds its way through a hilly, remote, and wooded tract of the Holly Springs National Forest for the next several miles, passing through the Tillatoba Lake Recreation Area (and along the coastline of the lake itself).

MS 330 leaves the National Forest and travels through farmland for a few miles to enter the town of Coffeeville at an intersection with MS 7. It enters town along Depot Street, passing through some neighborhoods before making a left onto Oklahoma Street (Old MS 7). It heads north along Oklahoma Street for a block before making a right onto Main Street and passing through downtown. The highway leaves Coffeeville, after crossing two bridges over two very large creeks, and heads southeast across some hilly woodlands to enter the Skuna River valley at the eastern end of the northern arm of Grenada Lake, where it has an intersection Elam South Road (former MS 335) in the community of Gums. It heads along the northern banks of the river for a couple miles to enter Calhoun County.

MS 330 continues up the Skuna River valley for a few more miles, through farmland, before coming to an end at an intersection with MS 32, just two miles west of Bruce.

The entire length of Mississippi Highway 330 is a rural, two-lane, state highway.

== Major intersections ==
| County | Location | mi | km | Destinations | Notes |
|---|---|---|---|---|---|
| Yalobusha | | 0.000 | 0.000 | US 51 – Grenada, Oakland | Western terminus |
| Yalobusha | | 2.376– 2.481 | 3.824– 3.993 | I-55 – Grenada, Memphis | Exit 220 (I-55) |
| Yalobusha | | 13.339 | 21.467 | MS 7 – Water Valley, Oxford, Grenada | |
| Yalobusha | Gums | 18.3 | 29.5 | Elam South Road – Gore Springs, Grenada Lake Recreation Area | Former MS 335 |
| Calhoun | | 33.271 | 53.544 | MS 32 – Water Valley, Bruce | Eastern terminus |
1.000 mi = 1.609 km; 1.000 km = 0.621 mi
