= Mississippi Highway 332 =

Highway in Mississippi

Mississippi Highway 332
- MS 332 highlighted in pink

Route information
- Maintained by MDOT & USACE
- Length: 3.344 mi (5.382 km)
- Existed: c. 1958–present

Major junctions
- West end: US 51 in Grenada
- East end: Toe Road near Grenada Lake

Location
- Country: United States
- State: Mississippi
- Counties: Grenada

Highway system
- Mississippi State Highway System; Interstate; US; State
← MS 331	→ MS 333

Mississippi Highway 332 (MS 332) is a highway in central Mississippi. Its western terminus is at U.S. Route 51 (US 51) in Grenada. The route travels northeastward through farmland to Grenada Municipal Airport. The road continues to its eastern terminus at Toe Road, southwest of the Grenada Lake. The designation was created in 1958 for a former segment of MS 7, which was rerouted north of the lake.

== Route description ==
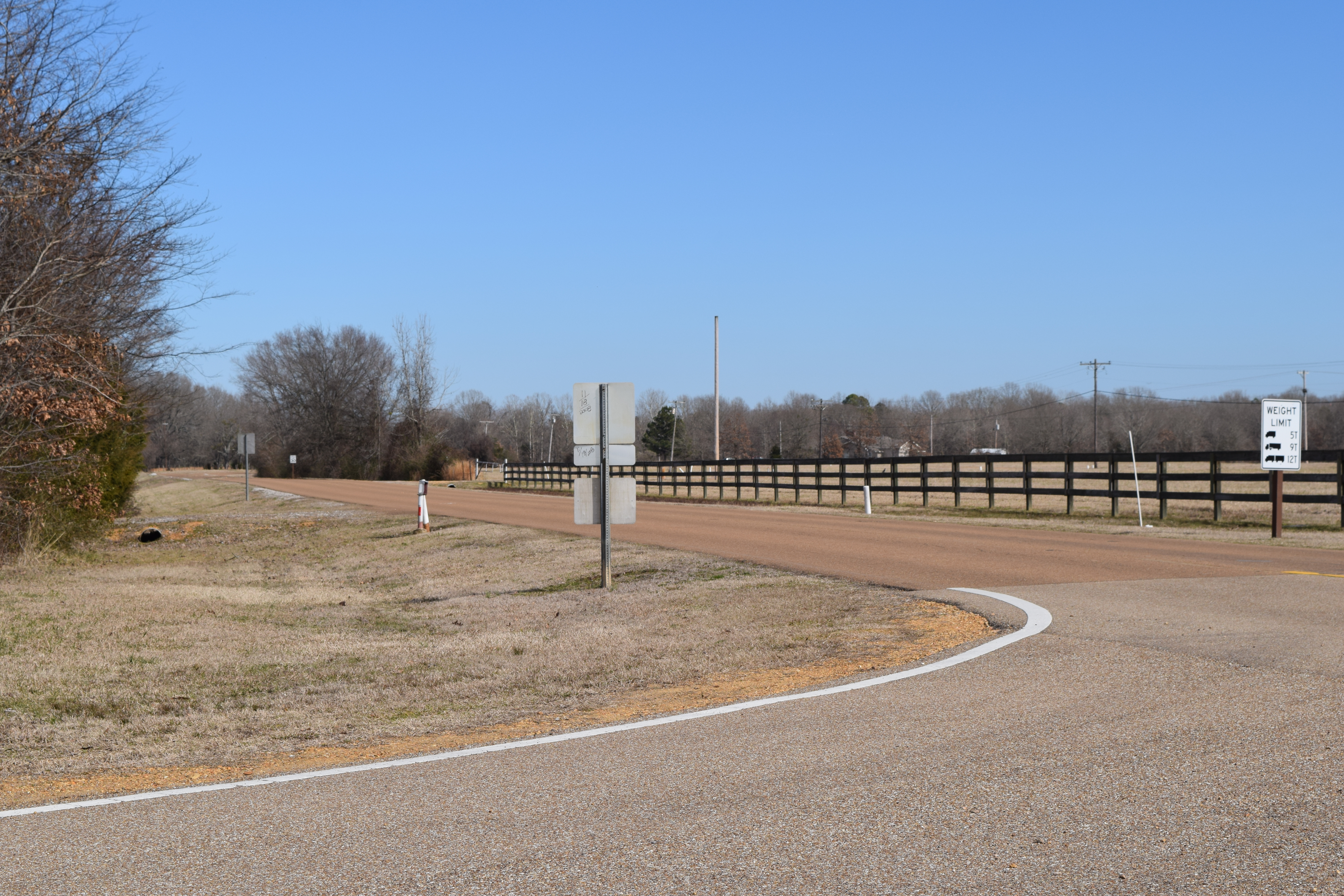
MS 332 near the Grenada Airport

All of the road is located within Grenada County. The route starts at its intersection with US 51, north of downtown Grenada. MS 332 then travels northeastward through a forested area and intersects Main Street. After crossing a Grenada Railroad line (notable for being the location of the Billups Neon Crossing Signal before it was dismantled), it passes by a small residential area. MS 332 travels north through farmland and turns northeast south of Airport Circle. The route then intersects Heatcraft Drive and Air Industrial Park Road south of Grenada Municipal Airport. State maintenance ends past the airport entrance at Mayor Boone Airport Road. The road continues northeast to its eastern terminus at Toe Road, near the Grenada Dam. Toe Road provides access to MS 333 Scenic from both termini.

MS 332 is legally defined in Mississippi Code § 65-3-3, and it is maintained by the Mississippi Department of Transportation (MDOT) and the United States Army Corps of Engineers (USACE). In 2015, MDOT calculated as many as 2,900 vehicles traveling east of US 51, and as few as 930 vehicles traveling east of Mayor Boone Airport Road.

== History ==
The short road that became MS 332 existed since 1928, from north of Grenada to south of the Grenada–Yalobusha county line as a gravel road. It later became part of MS 7 in 1932, and it was paved in 1939. Between 1946 and 1948, the Grenada Lake was constructed, and its northwest side bordered MS 7. By 1955, MS 7 was rerouted further north of the lake, with one section near Grenada remaining. The section was signed as MS 332 by 1958. The route has not been changed significantly since.

== Major intersections ==
The entire route is in Grenada County.

Location	mi	km	Destinations	Notes
Grenada	0.0	0.0	US 51 – Grenada, Batesville	Western terminus
Grenada	2.5	4.0	Mayor Boone Airport Road – Grenada Municipal Airport	End state maintenance
	3.4	5.5	Toe Road to MS 333 Scenic	Eastern terminus
1.000 mi = 1.609 km; 1.000 km = 0.621 mi

== See also ==
- Billups Neon Crossing Signal
- Mississippi Highway 335
