= Larry Stewart (disambiguation) =

Larry Stewart (born 1959) is an American singer.

Larry Stewart may also refer to:

- Larry Stewart (basketball) (born 1968), retired American basketball player
- Larry Stewart (philanthropist) (1948–2007), American philanthropist from Kansas City

== See also ==
- Larry Stuart (disambiguation)
