= Big Creek, Mississippi =

- Village
- Location of Big Creek, Mississippi
- Coordinates: 33°50′49″N 89°24′45″W
- Country: United States
- State: Mississippi
- County: Calhoun

Area
  - Total: 1.14 sq mi (2.94 km^{2})
  - Land: 1.14 sq mi (2.94 km^{2})
  - Water: 0 sq mi (0.00 km^{2})
- Elevation: 276 ft (84 m)

Population (2020)
  - Total: 133
  - Density: 117.2/sq mi (45.24/km^{2})
- Time zone: UTC-6 (Central (CST))
  - Summer (DST): UTC-5 (CDT)
- ZIP code: 38914
- Area code: 662
- FIPS code: 28-06060
- GNIS feature ID: 0667093

Big Creek is a village in Calhoun County, Mississippi, United States. As of the 2020 census, Big Creek had a population of 133.

== Geography ==
Big Creek is located in southwestern Calhoun County at 33°50′49″N 89°24′45″W (33.847075, -89.412573), 6 miles (10 km) west of Calhoun City and slightly over a mile west of Big Creek, a tributary of the Yalobusha River, which in turn is a tributary of the Yazoo River.

According to the United States Census Bureau, the village has a total area of 1.1 square miles (2.9 km^{2}), all land.

== Demographics ==
Historical population
Census	Pop.	Note	%±
1920	107		—
1930	140		30.8%
1940	147		5.0%
1950	147		0.0%
1960	100		−32.0%
1970	148		48.0%
1980	146		−1.4%
1990	123		−15.8%
2000	127		3.3%
2010	154		21.3%
2020	133		−13.6%
U.S. Decennial Census

As of the census of 2000, there were 127 people, 58 households, and 33 families residing in the village. The population density was 111.8 inhabitants per square mile (43.2/km^{2}). There were 69 housing units at an average density of 60.8 per square mile (23.5/km^{2}). The racial makeup of the village was 92.13% White, 6.30% African American, and 1.57% from two or more races.

There were 58 households, out of which 20.7% had children under the age of 18 living with them, 51.7% were married couples living together, 5.2% had a female householder with no husband present, and 41.4% were non-families. 36.2% of all households were made up of individuals, and 19.0% had someone living alone who was 65 years of age or older. The average household size was 2.19 and the average family size was 2.79.

In the village, the population was spread out, with 16.5% under the age of 18, 12.6% from 18 to 24, 26.0% from 25 to 44, 28.3% from 45 to 64, and 16.5% who were 65 years of age or older. The median age was 42 years. For every 100 females, there were 86.8 males. For every 100 females age 18 and over, there were 96.3 males.

The median income for a household in the village was $29,583, and the median income for a family was $31,875. Males had a median income of $30,625 versus $21,250 for females. The per capita income for the village was $12,745. There were 15.4% of families and 20.7% of the population living below the poverty line, including 38.1% of under eighteens and 20.0% of those over 64.

== Education ==
Big Creek is served by the Calhoun County School District.
