= Derma =

Derma may refer to:

- Dermis
- Derma, Mississippi
- Intestine, for use in cooking
- Kishke (Jewish food), or stuffed derma
