= Gibson, Mississippi =

- Unincorporated community
- Location within Mississippi Location within the United States
- Coordinates: 33°50′24″N 88°41′04″W
- Country: United States
- State: Mississippi
- County: Monroe
- Elevation: 259 ft (79 m)
- Time zone: UTC-6 (Central (CST))
  - Summer (DST): UTC-5 (CDT)
- Area code: 662
- GNIS feature ID: 670375

Gibson is an unincorporated community in Monroe County, Mississippi. Gibson is located west of Aberdeen on Mississippi Highway 8.

== History ==
Gibson is located along the CPKC Railway ex Kansas City Southern Railway and in 1924 had two general stores and a drugstore.

In 1900, Gibson had a population of 27.

A post office operated under the name Gibson from 1889 to 1979.
