= Duck Hill, Mississippi =

- Town
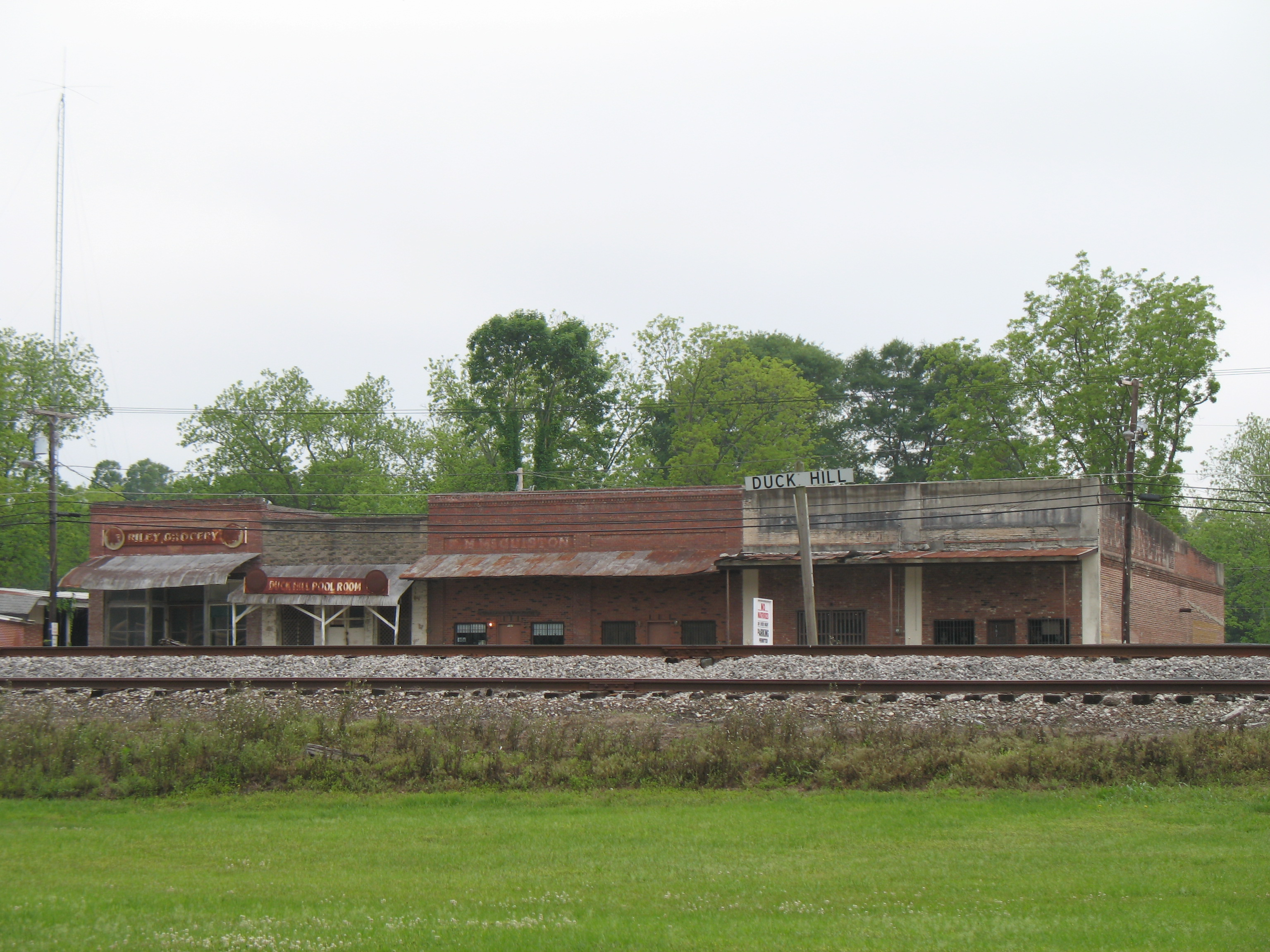
- Duck Hill from across the tracks

- Flag
- Motto: "The place called home"
- Location in Montgomery County and the state of Mississippi

- Location in the United States
- Coordinates: 33°37′55″N 89°42′53″W
- Country: United States
- State: Mississippi
- County: Montgomery

Government
  - Type: Mayor-Council

Area
  - Total: 1.03 sq mi (2.68 km^{2})
  - Land: 1.03 sq mi (2.68 km^{2})
  - Water: 0 sq mi (0.00 km^{2})
- Elevation: 253 ft (77 m)

Population (2020)
  - Total: 619
  - Density: 598.6/sq mi (231.12/km^{2})
- Time zone: UTC-6 (Central (CST))
  - Summer (DST): UTC-5 (CDT)
- ZIP code: 38925
- Area code: 662
- FIPS code: 28-20260
- GNIS feature ID: 0669470
- Website: cityofduckhill.com

Duck Hill is a town in Montgomery County, Mississippi, United States. The population was 619 at the 2020 census, down from 732 in 2010.

Duck Hill is located on U.S. Route 51, midway between Grenada and Winona. Big Bogue Creek flows east and north of the town.

The Lucie E. Campbell Gospel and Heritage Festival takes place each summer in Duck Hill.

== History ==
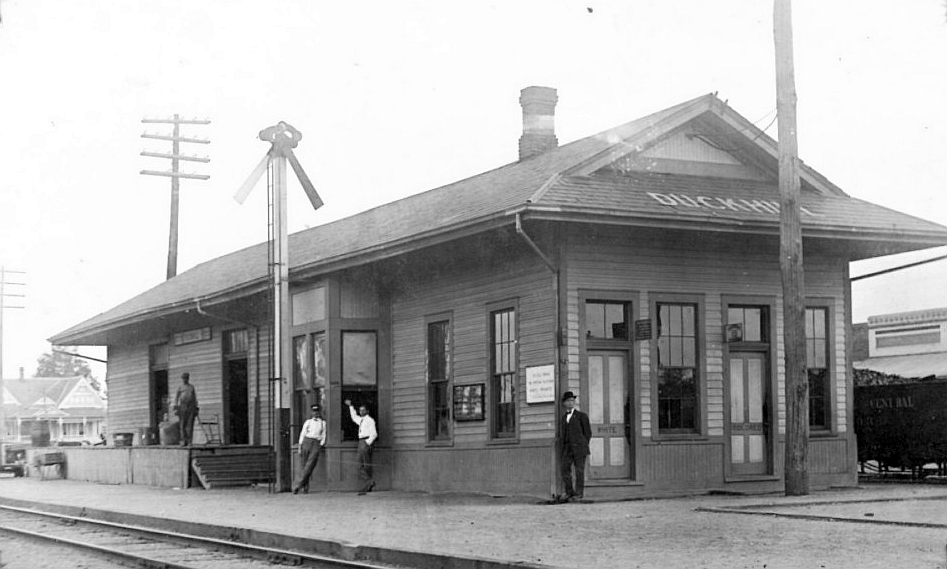
Illinois Central Depot in Duck Hill, c. 1910

Duck Hill is named for a large hill northeast of the town, where "Duck", a Choctaw chief, held war councils. Chief Duck was also a medicine man or shaman who treated his people. A statue of Chief Duck was located on U.S. Route 51 in Duck Hill, next to an old Illinois Central caboose.

The first European-American settler in the area was John A. Binford in 1834, who acquired land following Indian Removal of the Choctaw, who were forced to cede their lands to the United States. He built the first home in the area, and developed his property as a cotton plantation, based on enslaved African American workers. He became one of the region's most successful planters and large slaveholders. Binford was elected to the Mississippi Legislature. Duck Hill was a trading center for the cotton planters.

In 1856 the Illinois Central Railroad completed a line from Chicago to New Orleans, and it built a depot at Duck Hill. This stimulated its businesses. The line is now used for freight operation by the Grenada Railway.

A train wreck occurred at Duck Hill on October 19, 1862, during the American Civil War, when in the early morning hours two trains collided head-on, killing 34 men. Most of the dead were Confederate soldiers. It was the South's worst loss of life in a train accident to that time.

During the Civil War, Binford's sons, James R. and John A. Jr., helped lead the Confederate "Company E" of the 15th Mississippi Infantry Regiment from Duck Hill, known as the "McClung Rifles". James R. Binford later was elected to the Mississippi State Senate. After white Democrats regained control of the state legislature following the Reconstruction era, Binford wrote the notorious Jim Crow laws for Mississippi.

In 1887, regional businessmen hoped that Duck Hill would become a thriving mill town after iron ore was found nearby. Financial speculation followed. Tour of our Southern Correspondent reported in The New York Times:

Duck Hill is the euphonious appellation of a straggling wee bit of a hamlet down in the depths of Mississippi, a dozen miles or so from Grenada, on the Illinois Central Railroad, known to the world and to history in something less than a wholesale way.

Duck Hill was the site of a railroad robbery in 1888. Two armed men, Rube Burrow and Joe Jackson, clung to the outside of a train as it left the station, then climbed to the engine cab. They ordered the engineer to stop the train about a mile north of town. The robbers plundered the express car's safe of $3,000, killing one man who tried to intervene.

=== 20th century to present ===
In 1930, the Lloyd T. Binford High School opened in Duck Hill. It was named for noted white supremacist Lloyd T. Binford, a Memphis insurance executive and film censor, and the son of state senator James R. Binford. The city also built a segregated agriculture education facility for its African-American students.

A new elementary school was constructed in 1963. The schools have since been closed because of declining population in the town.

The high school's gymnasium is used as a community center. In 2012, a committee of volunteers was established to preserve the high school, which has suffered from vandalism.

During World War II, African Americans from across the country were among soldiers trained and stationed in the South. Many resented the segregation of public facilities they were forced to observe. In 1943, fifteen armed black soldiers from nearby Camp McCain came to Duck Hill during the night and began firing into the town. There were no injuries. The soldiers were upset about a recent white assault against a group of black soldiers at nearby Starkville.

Senator Trent Lott, whose father sharecropped a stretch of cotton field in Duck Hill during the 1940s, said in 1999 while supporting a bill for public education:

I am a product of public education from the first grade through the second, third, and fourth grades where I went to school at Duck Hill, Mississippi, and I had better teachers in the second, third, and fourth grades in Duck Hill, Mississippi, than I had the rest of my life.

=== Duck Hill lynchings of 1937 ===
The brutal lynching of two black men, Roosevelt Townes and Robert "Bootjack" McDaniels, in Duck Hill mid-day on April 13, 1937, gained national publicity. These were among nine lynchings of African Americans by whites in Montgomery County, Mississippi, from the post-Reconstruction period into the 20th century. Most occurred in the decades near the turn of the 20th century.

The men had been arraigned in the Montgomery County Courthouse in the county seat of Winona, charged with murdering George Windham, a grocer in Duck Hill, in December 1936. Both men pleaded not guilty. Outside the courthouse a crowd had gathered, and then a group of 12 white men abducted the two accused men from the courthouse.

Townes and McDaniels were loaded into a school bus and driven to a wooded area near Duck Hill. Hundreds of white people followed, and a crowd estimated at 300-500 looked on as Townes and McDaniels were each chained to a tree. A blowtorch was used to torture them, until each confessed to Windham's murder. Gasoline was doused on Townes, and on brush around him, and he was burned to death. McDaniels was riddled with bullets, and fatally shot through the head.

The police officers who had been guarding the two defendants said they were unable to identify any members of the mob. As was typical in lynching cases, no one was charged in the abduction or murders.

Newspapers carried a photograph of McDaniels' burned and tortured body chained to a tree, and the lynchings were nationally condemned. German newspapers at the time used the murders for propaganda, contrasting the lynchings to controls in Nazi Germany under the "humane" Nuremberg racial laws.

Such publicity enabled Joseph A. Gavagan (D-New York) to gain support for anti-lynching legislation he had put forward in the House of Representatives; it was supported in the Senate by Democrats Robert F. Wagner (New York) and Frederick Van Nuys (Indiana). The legislation eventually passed in the House, but the white Democrats of the Solid South (most blacks in the region were disenfranchised) blocked it in the Senate, with Senator Allen Ellender even proclaiming, "We shall at all cost preserve the white supremacy of America." Their colleagues had similarly defeated anti-lynching legislation in the 1920s that was passed overwhelmingly by the House.

== Geography ==
Duck Hill is in northwestern Montgomery County. U.S. Route 51 passes through the center of town, leading south 12 miles (19 km) to Winona, the county seat, and northwest 11 miles (18 km) to Grenada. Mississippi Highway 404 passes through the town as well, leading east 14 miles (23 km) to Alva and west 5 miles (8 km) to Interstate 55.

According to the U.S. Census Bureau, the town of Duck Hill has a total area of 1.0 square mile (2.6 km^{2}), all land. Big Bogue Creek forms part of the northern border of the town and flows northward to Batupan Bogue, a north-flowing tributary of the Yalobusha River, part of the Yazoo River watershed.

== Demographics ==
Historical population
Census	Pop.	Note	%±
1880	151		—
1890	332		119.9%
1900	242		−27.1%
1910	499		106.2%
1920	528		5.8%
1930	553		4.7%
1940	537		−2.9%
1950	537		0.0%
1960	674		25.5%
1970	809		20.0%
1980	706		−12.7%
1990	586		−17.0%
2000	746		27.3%
2010	732		−1.9%
2020	619		−15.4%
U.S. Decennial Census; 2010 2020

=== Racial and ethnic composition ===
Duck Hill town, Mississippi – Racial and ethnic composition Note: the US Census treats Hispanic/Latino as an ethnic category. This table excludes Latinos from the racial categories and assigns them to a separate category. Hispanics/Latinos may be of any race.
Race / Ethnicity (NH = Non-Hispanic)	Pop 2000	Pop 2010	Pop 2020	% 2000	% 2010	% 2020
White alone (NH)	264	222	169	35.39%	30.33%	27.30%
Black or African American alone (NH)	471	493	439	63.14%	67.35%	70.92%
Native American or Alaska Native alone (NH)	0	3	2	0.00%	0.41%	0.32%
Asian alone (NH)	0	0	0	0.00%	0.00%	0.00%
Native Hawaiian or Pacific Islander alone (NH)	0	0	0	0.00%	0.00%	0.00%
Other race alone (NH)	0	0	0	0.00%	0.00%	0.00%
Mixed race or Multiracial (NH)	5	9	8	0.67%	1.23%	1.29%
Hispanic or Latino (any race)	6	5	1	0.80%	0.68%	0.16%
Total	746	732	619	100.00%	100.00%	100.00%

=== 2000 Census ===
As of the census of 2000, there were 746 people, 307 households, and 201 families residing in the town. The population density was 720.8 inhabitants per square mile (278.3/km^{2}). There were 331 housing units at an average density of 319.8 per square mile (123.5/km^{2}). The racial makeup of the town was 63.27% African American, 36.06% White and 0.67% from two or more races. Hispanic or Latino of any race were 0.80% of the population.

There were 307 households, out of which 36.8% had children under the age of 18 living with them, 44.3% were married couples living together, 16.6% had a female householder with no husband present, and 34.5% were non-families. 33.2% of all households were made up of individuals, and 16.9% had someone living alone who was 65 years of age or older. The average household size was 2.43 and the average family size was 3.11.

In the town, the population was spread out, with 30.3% under the age of 18, 7.0% from 18 to 24, 26.5% from 25 to 44, 20.4% from 45 to 64, and 15.8% who were 65 years of age or older. The median age was 34 years. For every 100 females, there were 81.5 males. For every 100 females aged 18 and over, there were 69.9 males.

The median income for a household in the town was $24,118, and the median income for a family was $29,375. Males had a median income of $26,731 versus $15,639 for females. The per capita income for the town was $11,550. About 18.9% of families and 21.4% of the population were below the poverty line, including 21.3% of those under age 18 and 32.6% of those age 65 or over.

== Economy ==
There are several small businesses within the town limits. Of those include a small Jiffy Mart gas station where U.S. Route 51 and Main Street intersect and a Regions Bank. In September 2009, a Dollar General was opened adjacent to U.S. Route 51 in the north part of town.

== Arts and culture ==
Lucie Campbell, a singer and composer of gospel music, was born in Duck Hill and a small memorial recounting her achievements in the music industry is located near the statue of Chief Duck.

=== Churches ===
The following is a list of churches in Duck Hill:

- Duck Hill Missionary Baptist Church
- Duck Hill Baptist Church
- MT Pleasant Missionary Baptist Church
- Wilkin Chapel Baptist Church
- Unity Baptist Church
- Sweet Home MB Church
- St. Mark MB Church
- Binford Chapel United Methodist
- Duck Hill Church of God In Christ
- Victory Apostolic Church of Duck Hill

== Education ==
Winona-Montgomery Consolidated School District serves Duck Hill and operates its schools in Winona.

Duck Hill was formerly served by the Montgomery County School District, which operated Montgomery County High School and Montgomery County Elementary School. The aforementioned schools were located in Kilmichael. The Duck Hill Head Start Center is a preschool located at 620 Carrollton St.

At one time Duck Hill had its own elementary school, Duck Hill Elementary School; circa 2001 it had around 100 students. At that time school district officials were considering closing it and moving the students to Kilmichael Elementary. The district also, at one time, operated Duck Hill High School.

Effective July 1, 2018, the Montgomery County and Winona Separate School District consolidated into the Winona-Montgomery district.

== Notable people ==
- Lloyd Binford, insurance executive and head of the Memphis Censor Board for 28 years
- Roxcy Bolton, women's rights activist
- Lucie Campbell, composer of hymns
- Little Willie Farmer (born June 2, 1956), blues singer, guitarist, and songwriter
- Trent Lott, former member of the United States House of Representatives and the United States Senate
- Clyde E. Wood, member of the Mississippi House of Representatives from 1968 to 1976
