= Billups Neon Crossing Signal =

Prototypical grade crossing signal formerly located in Grenada, Mississippi

Coordinates: 33.80555°N 89.80159°W

Photographs of the signal
- Photographed in 1940
- Photographed in 1970

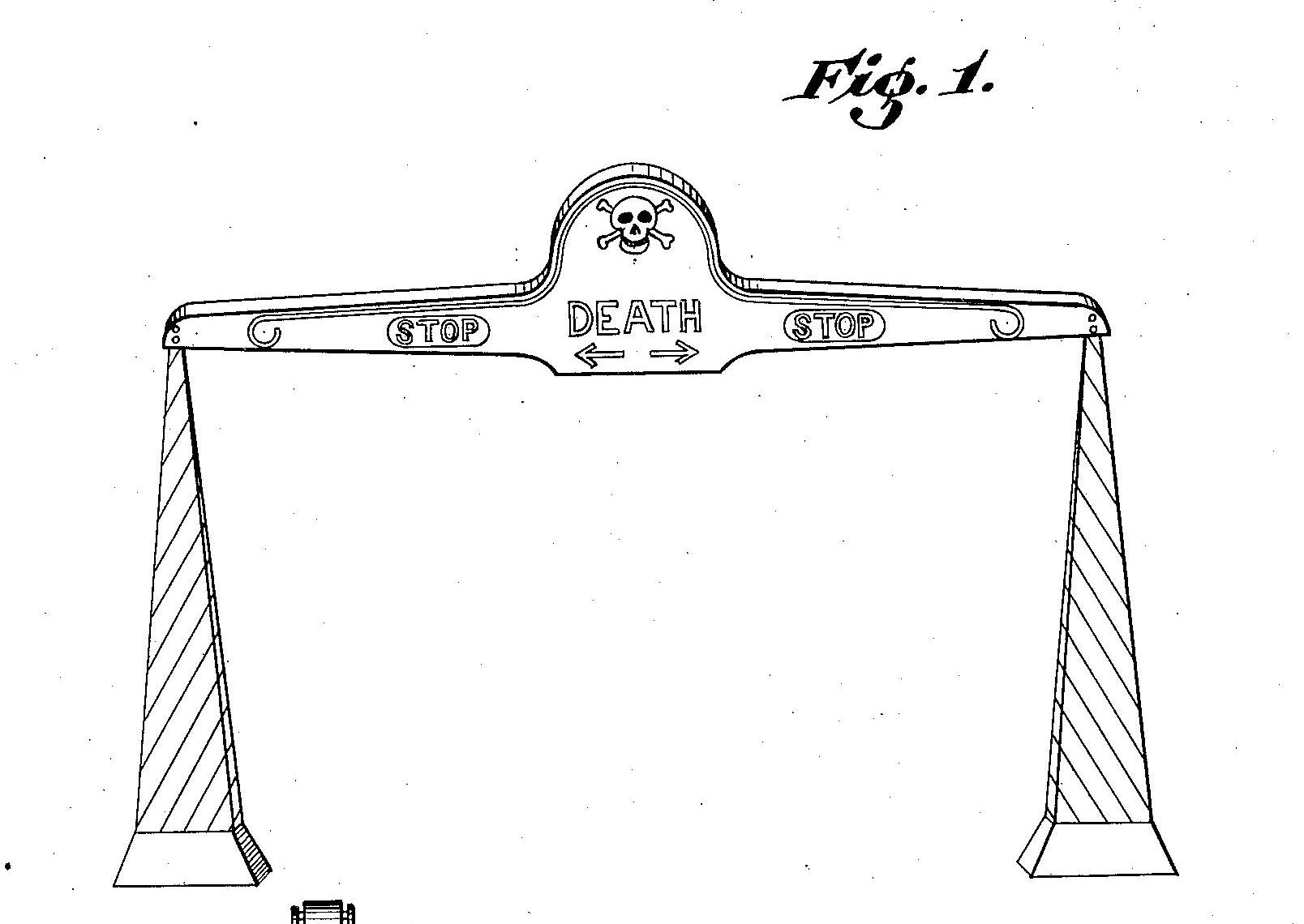
Illustration of the signal from its patent

The Billups Neon Crossing Signal was an experimental grade crossing signal installed at a dangerous Illinois Central crossing on Mississippi Highway 7 (now Mississippi Highway 332) in Grenada, Mississippi.

The signal was installed in the mid-1930s by inventor Alonzo Billups over growing concern due to numerous collisions at the crossing involving trains and motor vehicles. Unlike anything likely seen around the country at the time, the Billups signal was a large gantry spanning the highway and was likely the first such use of a gantry-style crossing of the type now in relatively common use. Upon approach of a train, a large alternating blue and red neon sign lit up with the words "STOP - DEATH - STOP" beneath a skull and crossbones. Flashing neon arrows indicated the direction that oncoming trains were traveling and an air raid siren (civil defense siren) in lieu of bells provided aural warning. As a backup, standard railway flashers were mounted below the neon sign. The signal was known locally as the "Skull and Crossbones."

The crossing photographed in 2026, using standard signals. The concrete foundations of the Billups signal are visible on the bottom right.

The onset of World War II brought about a scarcity of neon, which, when coupled with maintenance problems with the signal (often manifesting themselves in the siren sounding continuously until a crew arrived to stop it), meant that no further signals were produced. The prototype later had standard railway crossing signals installed alongside it until it was removed entirely around 1970, in which the standard signals replaced it entirely.
