= Wise Gap, Mississippi =

- Unincorporated community
- Location within Mississippi Location within the United States
- Coordinates: 33°53′56″N 88°19′54″W
- Country: United States
- State: Mississippi
- County: Monroe
- Elevation: 400 ft (120 m)
- Time zone: UTC-6 (Central (CST))
  - Summer (DST): UTC-5 (CDT)
- Area code: 662
- GNIS feature ID: 692328

Wise Gap, (also known as Wise's Gap), is an unincorporated community in Monroe County, Mississippi, United States.

Wise Gap is located east of Amory. It is located near the intersection of U.S. Route 278 and Mississippi Highway 8.

== History ==
The community is named for the Wise family, who were early settlers of the area. It was one of the first settled communities in North Mississippi and was once home to a church, camp ground, multiple stores, and blacksmith shop.

Wise Gap is located along the BNSF Railway.

The Wise Gap Field is a natural gas field located in Wise Gap.

== Notable person ==
- Tilghman Tucker, governor of Mississippi from 1842 to 1844. Worked as a blacksmith in Wise Gap.
