= Derma, Mississippi =

- Town
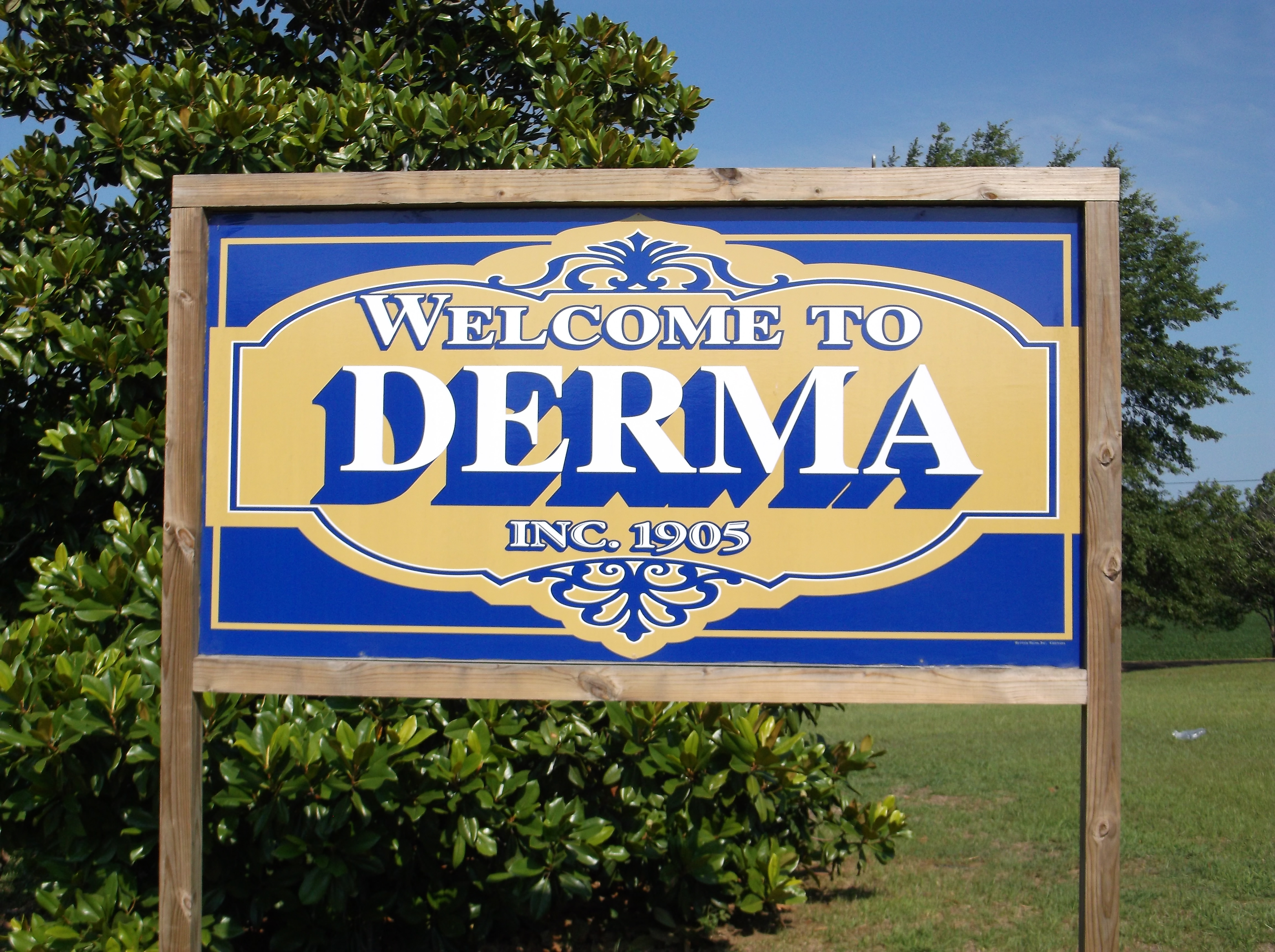
- Welcome sign in Derma

- Flag

- Location of Derma, Mississippi

- Location in the United States
- Coordinates: 33°51′24″N 89°17′11″W
- Country: United States
- State: Mississippi
- County: Calhoun

Area
  - Total: 1.77 sq mi (4.59 km^{2})
  - Land: 1.77 sq mi (4.59 km^{2})
  - Water: 0 sq mi (0.00 km^{2})
- Elevation: 292 ft (89 m)

Population (2020)
  - Total: 957
  - Density: 540.4/sq mi (208.65/km^{2})
- Time zone: UTC-6 (Central (CST))
  - Summer (DST): UTC-5 (CDT)
- ZIP code: 38839
- Area code: 662
- FIPS code: 28-18940
- GNIS feature ID: 0669237

Derma is a town in Calhoun County, Mississippi, United States. As of the 2020 census, Derma had a population of 957.

== History ==
In September 1906, The Southern Railway built a branch line operated by the Mobile and Ohio Railroad through Derma. Due to the speculative development of the neighboring city of Calhoun City, Mississippi, Derma did not receive a station when the railroad opened, but a station was later built around 1909.

== Geography ==
Derma is located in south-central Calhoun County at 33°51′24″N 89°17′11″W (33.856531, -89.286384). It is bordered to the west by Calhoun City. Mississippi Highway 8 runs through the center of town, leading west into Calhoun City and east 6 miles (10 km) to Vardaman.

According to the United States Census Bureau, the town has a total area of 1.8 square miles (4.6 km^{2}), all land. The Yalobusha River, a tributary of the Yazoo River, passes about one mile south of the town.

== Demographics ==
Historical population
Census	Pop.	Note	%±
1910	383		—
1920	317		−17.2%
1930	456		43.8%
1940	477		4.6%
1950	494		3.6%
1960	578		17.0%
1970	660		14.2%
1980	793		20.2%
1990	959		20.9%
2000	1,023		6.7%
2010	1,025		0.2%
2020	957		−6.6%
U.S. Decennial Census

=== Racial and ethnic composition ===
Derma town, Mississippi – Racial and ethnic composition Note: the US Census treats Hispanic/Latino as an ethnic category. This table excludes Latinos from the racial categories and assigns them to a separate category. Hispanics/Latinos may be of any race.
Race / Ethnicity (NH = Non-Hispanic)	Pop 2000	Pop 2010	Pop 2020	% 2000	% 2010	% 2020
White alone (NH)	424	378	313	41.45%	36.88%	32.71%
Black or African American alone (NH)	590	625	560	57.67%	60.98%	58.52%
Native American or Alaska Native alone (NH)	1	1	4	0.10%	0.10%	0.42%
Asian alone (NH)	0	0	0	0.00%	0.00%	0.00%
Native Hawaiian or Pacific Islander alone (NH)	0	0	0	0.00%	0.00%	0.00%
Other race alone (NH)	1	0	0	0.10%	0.00%	0.00%
Mixed race or Multiracial (NH)	3	7	29	0.29%	0.68%	3.03%
Hispanic or Latino (any race)	4	14	51	0.39%	1.37%	5.33%
Total	1,023	1,025	957	100.00%	100.00%	100.00%

=== 2020 census ===
As of the 2020 United States census, there were 957 people, 465 households, and 297 families residing in the town.

=== 2000 census ===
As of the census of 2000, there were 1,023 people, 374 households, and 287 families residing in the town. The population density was 909.3 inhabitants per square mile (351.1/km^{2}). There were 397 housing units at an average density of 352.9 per square mile (136.3/km^{2}). The racial makeup of the town was 57.67% African American, 41.45% White, 0.10% Native American, 0.10% Pacific Islander, 0.10% from other races, and 0.59% from two or more races. Hispanic or Latino of any race were 0.39% of the population.

There were 374 households, out of which 40.6% had children under the age of 18 living with them, 47.1% were married couples living together, 24.6% had a female householder with no husband present, and 23.0% were non-families. 22.2% of all households were made up of individuals, and 10.4% had someone living alone who was 65 years of age or older. The average household size was 2.74 and the average family size was 3.20.

In the town, the population was spread out, with 31.3% under the age of 18, 8.8% from 18 to 24, 28.8% from 25 to 44, 19.5% from 45 to 64, and 11.6% who were 65 years of age or older. The median age was 32 years. For every 100 females, there were 80.1 males. For every 100 females age 18 and over, there were 74.0 males.

The median income for a household in the town was $22,344, and the median income for a family was $31,000. Males had a median income of $22,130 versus $16,364 for females. The per capita income for the town was $14,274. About 17.6% of families and 18.6% of the population were below the poverty line, including 23.8% of those under age 18 and 20.3% of those age 65 or over.

== Education ==
Derma is served by the Calhoun County School District.

== Notable natives ==
- Glenn Hardin, Olympic gold medalist
