= Mississippi Highway 335 =

Former highway in Mississippi

Mississippi Highway 335
- MS 335 highlighted in pink

Route information
- Maintained by MSHC and Grenada County
- Length: 13.3 mi (21.4 km)
- Existed: c. 1958–c. 1967

Major junctions
- South end: MS 8 near Gore Springs
- North end: MS 330 near Gums

Location
- Country: United States
- State: Mississippi
- Counties: Grenada, Yalobusha

Highway system
- Mississippi State Highway System; Interstate; US; State
← MS 334	→ MS 336

Mississippi Highway 335 (MS 335) was a state highway in central Mississippi. The route started at MS 8 near Gore Springs, and it traveled northward over eastern Grenada County. MS 335 then crossed over the Grenada Lake and entered Yalobusha County. The route continued northward and ended at MS 330 near Gums. MS 335 was designated around 1958, from the Grenada–Yalobusha county line to MS 330. It was extended southwards in 1960 to MS 8, before being removed from the state highway system by 1967.

== Route description ==
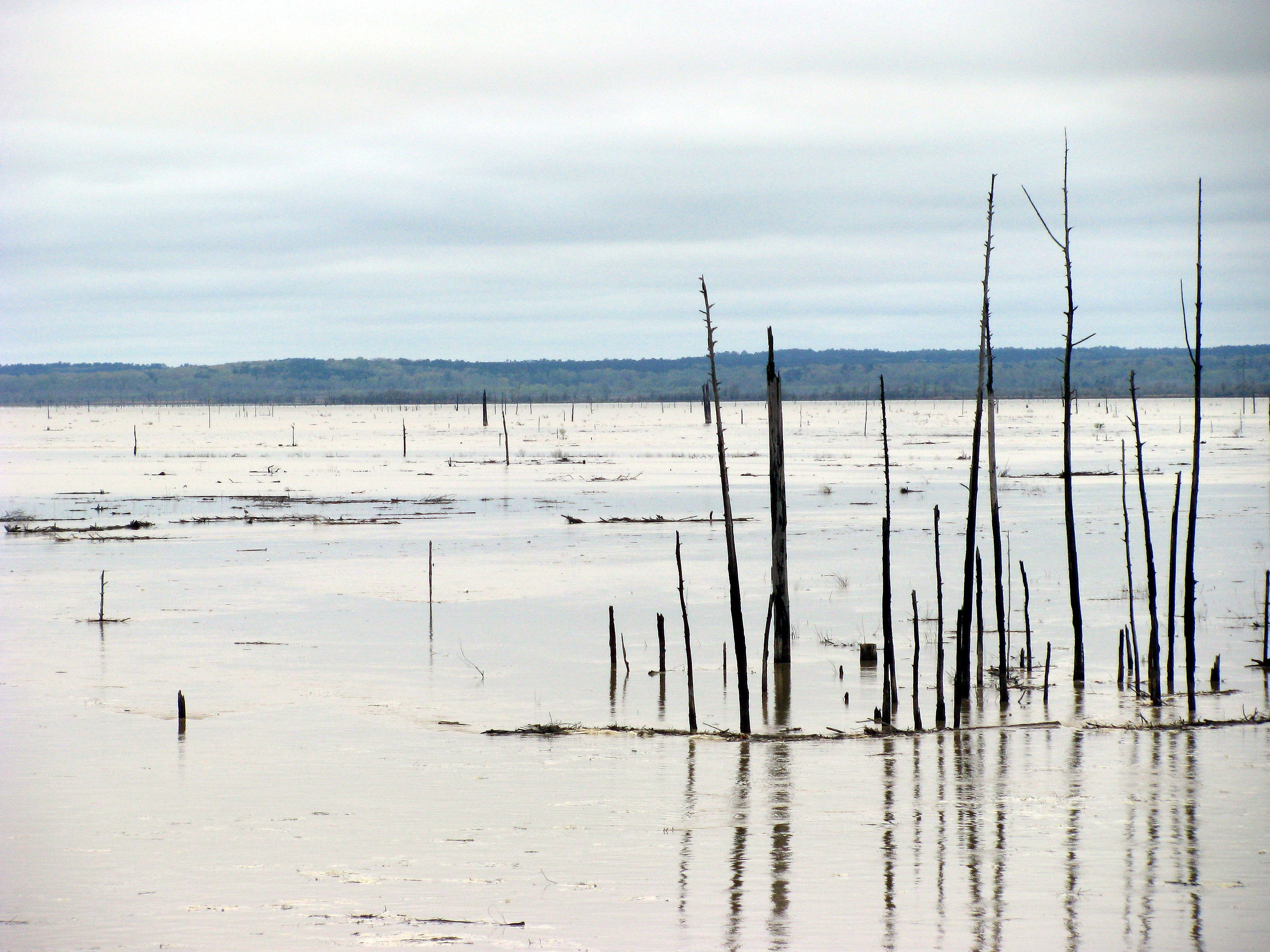
Grenada Lake

The route was located in eastern Grenada County and southern Yalobusha County. MS 335 started at MS 8 near Gore Springs, and it traveled north towards the Grenada Lake. The route traveled along Graysport Crossing Road, crossed the lake via a causeway after intersecting minor county routes. North of the lake, MS 335 continued north as Gums Crossing Road, as Graysport Crossing Road turned eastward. The route entered Yalobusha County north of Hendrix Road. In Yalobusha County, the road is now known as County Road 221 (CO 221) and Elam South Road. North of CO 186, the route crossed over Skuna River and the Mississippi and Skuna railroad. MS 335 ended at MS 330 near Gums, north of the railroad intersection. The road was maintained by the Mississippi State Highway Commission (MSHC) and Grenada County, as part of the state highway system.

== History ==
Around 1958, MS 335 was designated along an asphalt road from the Grenada–Yalobusha county line to MS 330 southeast of Coffeeville. The route was extended southwards to MS 8 by 1960, and it was maintained by Grenada County south of the county line. MS 335 was then removed from the state highway system by 1967. The route is now known as Graysport Crossing Road and Gums Crossing Road in Grenada County, and CO 221 in Yalobusha County.

== Major intersections ==
County	Location	mi	km	Destinations	Notes
Grenada	Gore Springs	0.0	0.0	MS 8	Southern terminus
Yalobusha	Gums	13.3	21.4	MS 330	Northern terminus
1.000 mi = 1.609 km; 1.000 km = 0.621 mi
