= Cornelius Wortham =

American football player (born 1982)

No. 50
- Position: Linebacker

Personal information
- Born: January 25, 1982 (age 44); Calhoun City, Mississippi, U.S.
- Listed height: 6 ft 1 in (1.85 m)
- Listed weight: 236 lb (107 kg)

Career information
- High school: Calhoun City
- College: Alabama
- NFL draft: 2005: 7th round, 235th overall pick

Career history
- Seattle Seahawks (2005); New Orleans Saints (2007)*
- * Offseason or practice squad member only

Awards and highlights
- First-team All-SEC (2004)
- Stats at Pro Football Reference

Cornelius Wortham (born January 25, 1982) is an American former professional football player who was a linebacker in the National Football League (NFL). He played college football for the Alabama Crimson Tide and was selected by the Seattle Seahawks in the seventh round of the 2005 NFL draft with the 235th overall pick.

== Football career ==
Wortham attended the University of Alabama.

He played for Seattle Seahawks of the NFL before getting cut prior the 2006 season. In February 2007, Cornelius was signed as a free agent by the New Orleans Saints. He was released on April 6, 2007.

== Personal life ==
Wortham currently resides in Indiana.
