= Larry Stuart =

Larry Stuart may refer to:

- Enzo Stuarti (1919–2005), Italian American tenor and musical theater performer, who used the stage name Larry Stuart
- Larry Stuart (javelin thrower) (1937–2015), American track and field athlete

== See also ==
- Larry Stewart (disambiguation)
