= Little Willie Farmer =

- Birth name: Willie Cris Farmer
- Born: June 2, 1956 (age 68); Duck Hill, Mississippi, United States
- Genres: Blues
- Occupation(s): Singer, guitarist, songwriter
- Instrument(s): Vocals, guitar
- Years active: 1970s–present

Willie Cris Farmer, known professionally as Little Willie Farmer (born June 2, 1956) is an American blues singer, guitarist, and songwriter. One reviewer described Farmer as "the best traditional Mississippi Blues artist today". He has released two albums and performed at various events and festivals.

== Life and career ==
He was born in Duck Hill, Mississippi, United States. From a family of ten, Farmer spent time as a child on his family's smallholding eight miles outside of Duck Hill, doing menial farm chores. A dose of whooping cough meant that Farmer graduated from high school in 1976, a year later than his contemporaries. From a musical family, Farmer first played guitar at the age of 13, and was given his first guitar by an elder brother. Eventually Farmer earned sufficient funds from picking cotton that he bought his own guitar, and later still an electric model and amplifier, purchased from his cousin. His father installed in Farmer the importance of correctly tuning guitars, self-tuning practices that Farmer keeps to this day.

He initially played the guitar for home audiences and at schoolday events, having learned blues and R&B songs through listening to a radio station based out of Nashville, Tennessee. Farmer was drawn to the work of B.B. King, Little Milton, Howlin' Wolf and Lightnin' Hopkins. By the age of 15, Farmer was proficient enough to expand his musical horizons and by his early 20s he had joined a loose knit ensemble that played at local juke joints. He grew disconnected when at the rough venues "people liked to fight like crazy". By this time Farmer was a self-taught auto mechanic, and he eventually opened his own business in Duck Hill, next to a property he built on family land. Alongside his regular work, Farmer performed regularly on evenings and weekends with local semi-professional gospel music groups, including the Rising Sun Singers, the Angelettes, and, for a period of nine years, the Silvertone Gospel Singers. The pull of playing blues music, and removing the hassle of maintaining a group, saw Farmer develop his own solo act. He first played gospel music and then performed blues with artists such as Johnnie Billington, Bobby Rush, and Lynn White. Farmer worked for more than 30 years at his own auto repair business in his hometown, but helped to arrange a local blues festival in 2003. The Grassroots Blues Festival was staged in a meadow outside Duck Hill and, through this event, Farmer became acquainted and befriended other blues musicians including Willie King and Leo "Bud" Welch.

In 2016, Farmer's abilities came to the attention, via YouTube, of Wolf Records owner, Hannes Folterbauer. He promised to fly to the United States and record Farmer, which took place in Farmer's home in 2017. Farmer quickly composed "I'm Coming Back Home" on the spot and Folterbauer was impressed enough with the song to use it as the title of Farmer's debut album, I'm Coming Back Home. It was released on July 14, 2017. The recording was a blend of his own material, plus a number of Farmer's own versions of older material such as "Goin to Louisiana", "Little Red Rooster", "Boogie Chillum", Little Schoolgirl", and "Rock Me Baby". On the recording, Farmer alternated between electric and acoustic guitar playing in a style reminiscent of Lightnin' Hopkins. Farmer was one of several artists then supported by the Music Maker Relief Foundation. The MMRF assisted his career with video production and getting him a passport so he could travel internationally. In 2019, Farmer's next album was The Man From the Hill. It was the first time that Farmer had spent any time in a recording studio, working as he was at the Delta-Sonic Sound Studio in Memphis, Tennessee. Farmer moved between Hill country blues and gospel on the recording, which was released by Big Legal Mess Records, a subsidiary of Fat Possum Records. Farmer hoped that takings from the album would enable him to retire from his auto repair business. Farmer stated "I'm trying to get out of that shop, I'm tried of messing with those cars. It's been a long time".

On October 31, 2021, Farmer entered the Solo Blues Challenge Competition at the Blue Biscuit in Indianola, Mississippi. Farmer explained "It was the best solo. They looked for clarity, it had to be your own song, they listened to the sound of the voice, how you performed, how it all comes together". Although the competition only had four entrants, Farmer was pleased to win, and said he was the youngest among the competitors. On February 2, 2022, Farmer performed at the Florida Gulf Coast University Blues Concert in Fort Myers, Florida. Farmer then played at the 2022 King Biscuit Blues Festival, and at the 2022 Telluride Blues & Brews Festival.

== Discography ==
=== Albums ===
Year	Title	Record label
2017	I'm Coming Back Home	Wolf Records
2019	The Man from the Hill	Big Legal Mess Records
