= Calhoun City, Mississippi =

- Town
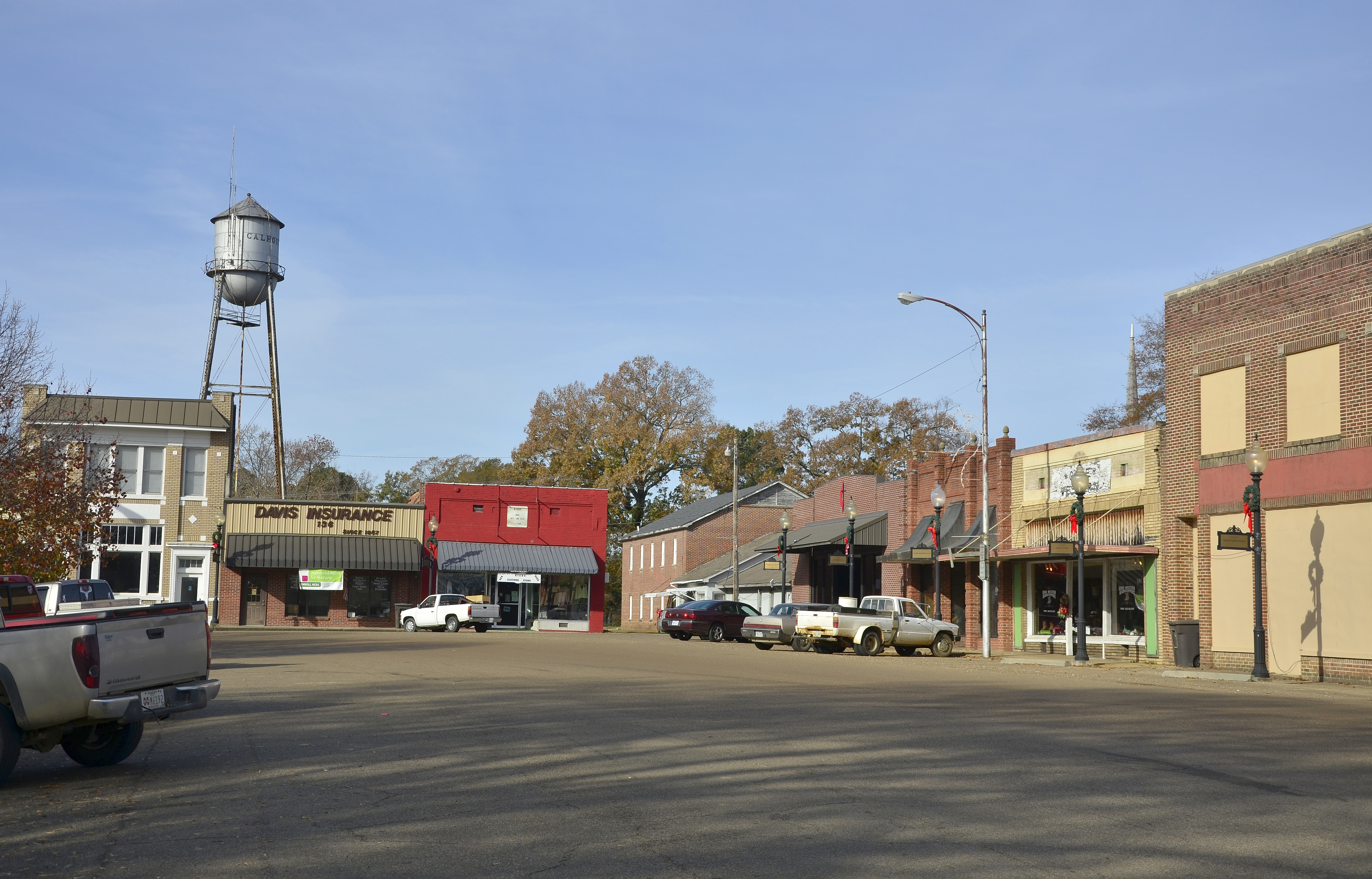
- Water tower in downtown Calhoun City

- Flag

- Location of Calhoun City, Mississippi

- Location in the United States Calhoun City, Mississippi (the United States)
- Coordinates: 33°51′25″N 89°18′48″W
- Country: United States
- State: Mississippi
- County: Calhoun

Area
  - Total: 2.37 sq mi (6.15 km^{2})
  - Land: 2.36 sq mi (6.11 km^{2})
  - Water: 0.015 sq mi (0.04 km^{2})
- Elevation: 282 ft (86 m)

Population (2020)
  - Total: 1,533
  - Density: 650.3/sq mi (251.09/km^{2})
- Time zone: UTC-6 (Central (CST))
  - Summer (DST): UTC-5 (CDT)
- ZIP codes: 38916, 38955
- Area code: 662
- FIPS code: 28-10580
- GNIS feature ID: 0667920
- Website: www.calhouncityms.gov

Calhoun City is a town in Calhoun County, Mississippi, United States. As of the 2020 census, Calhoun City had a population of 1,533.

== History ==
The site of Calhoun City was part of the Chickasaw nation before the earliest settlers.

The first person to settle in the area was Thomas T. Gore, who settled the area around 1840.

On July 25, 1905, The state granted a charter for the town of Burkett. Developed by Frank Burkitt, a Confederate veteran from Lawrenceburg, Tennessee in anticipation of the Southern Railway's branch line extending into the county.

A post office was established in 1905 with the name Burkett.

In September 1905, the railroad branch reached Calhoun City.

In 1906, the town was renamed from Burkett to Calhoun City, named after John C. Calhoun. The state incorporated the town July 25, 1906.

== Geography ==
Calhoun City is located in south-central Calhoun County, and is bordered on the east by the town of Derma. Mississippi Highway 9 runs through the center of the town, leading north 6 miles (10 km) to Pittsboro, the county seat, and 10 miles (16 km) north to Bruce. Mississippi Highway 8 leads east from the center of town 8 miles (13 km) to Vardaman and 18 miles (29 km) to Houston. The two highways head south from the town together, Highway 9 leading 9 miles (14 km) south to Slate Springs and Highway 8 leading 31 miles (50 km) south then west to Grenada.

According to the United States Census Bureau, the town has a total area of 2.37 square miles (6.15 km^{2}), of which 2.36 square miles (6.11 km^{2}) is land and 0.02 square miles (0.04 km^{2}), or 0.69%, is water. The Yalobusha River, a tributary of the Yazoo River, passes a mile south of the center of town.

=== Climate ===
Climate data for Calhoun City, Mississippi (1991–2020 normals, extremes 1915–1918, 1927, 1955–present)
Month	Jan	Feb	Mar	Apr	May	Jun	Jul	Aug	Sep	Oct	Nov	Dec	Year
Record high °F (°C)	81 (27)	86 (30)	91 (33)	93 (34)	96 (36)	105 (41)	104 (40)	106 (41)	104 (40)	98 (37)	90 (32)	81 (27)	106 (41)
Mean daily maximum °F (°C)	53.8 (12.1)	58.6 (14.8)	67.0 (19.4)	74.8 (23.8)	81.9 (27.7)	88.1 (31.2)	91.1 (32.8)	91.1 (32.8)	86.4 (30.2)	76.8 (24.9)	64.8 (18.2)	56.4 (13.6)	74.2 (23.4)
Daily mean °F (°C)	42.9 (6.1)	46.9 (8.3)	54.8 (12.7)	62.7 (17.1)	70.8 (21.6)	77.9 (25.5)	81.0 (27.2)	80.4 (26.9)	74.7 (23.7)	63.8 (17.7)	52.5 (11.4)	45.6 (7.6)	62.8 (17.1)
Mean daily minimum °F (°C)	31.9 (−0.1)	35.2 (1.8)	42.6 (5.9)	50.7 (10.4)	59.7 (15.4)	67.6 (19.8)	71.0 (21.7)	69.8 (21.0)	63.0 (17.2)	50.9 (10.5)	40.2 (4.6)	34.8 (1.6)	51.4 (10.8)
Record low °F (°C)	−14 (−26)	3 (−16)	10 (−12)	26 (−3)	33 (1)	42 (6)	50 (10)	47 (8)	34 (1)	24 (−4)	11 (−12)	−8 (−22)	−14 (−26)
Average precipitation inches (mm)	5.26 (134)	5.16 (131)	5.30 (135)	6.20 (157)	5.53 (140)	5.43 (138)	4.27 (108)	3.67 (93)	3.62 (92)	3.62 (92)	3.88 (99)	5.96 (151)	57.90 (1,471)
Average snowfall inches (cm)	0.4 (1.0)	0.3 (0.76)	0.0 (0.0)	0.0 (0.0)	0.0 (0.0)	0.0 (0.0)	0.0 (0.0)	0.0 (0.0)	0.0 (0.0)	0.0 (0.0)	0.0 (0.0)	0.1 (0.25)	0.8 (2.0)
Average precipitation days (≥ 0.01 in)	8.8	8.5	9.7	8.2	8.4	8.2	8.0	7.5	5.4	5.9	7.3	8.8	94.7
Average snowy days (≥ 0.1 in)	0.5	0.2	0.0	0.0	0.0	0.0	0.0	0.0	0.0	0.0	0.0	0.2	0.9
Source: NOAA

== Demographics ==
Historical population
Census	Pop.	Note	%±
1910	477		—
1920	502		5.2%
1930	1,012		101.6%
1940	1,171		15.7%
1950	1,319		12.6%
1960	1,714		29.9%
1970	1,847		7.8%
1980	2,033		10.1%
1990	1,838		−9.6%
2000	1,872		1.8%
2010	1,774		−5.2%
2020	1,533		−13.6%
U.S. Decennial Census

=== 2020 census ===
As of the 2020 census, Calhoun City had a population of 1,533. The median age was 41.6 years. 22.7% of residents were under the age of 18 and 23.4% of residents were 65 years of age or older. For every 100 females there were 84.0 males, and for every 100 females age 18 and over there were 73.2 males age 18 and over.

0.0% of residents lived in urban areas, while 100.0% lived in rural areas.

There were 631 households in Calhoun City, of which 32.6% had children under the age of 18 living in them. Of all households, 33.9% were married-couple households, 19.3% were households with a male householder and no spouse or partner present, and 42.2% were households with a female householder and no spouse or partner present. About 33.9% of all households were made up of individuals and 13.2% had someone living alone who was 65 years of age or older.

There were 764 housing units, of which 17.4% were vacant. The homeowner vacancy rate was 2.0% and the rental vacancy rate was 25.1%.

Racial composition as of the 2020 census
Race	Number	Percent
White	803	52.4%
Black or African American	638	41.6%
American Indian and Alaska Native	0	0.0%
Asian	1	0.1%
Native Hawaiian and Other Pacific Islander	0	0.0%
Some other race	26	1.7%
Two or more races	65	4.2%
Hispanic or Latino (of any race)	40	2.6%

=== 2000 census ===
As of the census of 2000, there were 1,872 people, 736 households, and 530 families residing in the town. The population density was 789.1 inhabitants per square mile (304.7/km^{2}). There were 827 housing units at an average density of 348.6 per square mile (134.6/km^{2}). The racial makeup of the town was 66.72% Caucasian, 32.00% African American, 0.11% Native American, 0.05% Asian, 0.16% from other races, and 0.96% from two or more races. Hispanic or Latino of any race were 0.69% of the population.

There were 736 households, out of which 34.5% had children under the age of 18 living with them, 44.3% were married couples living together, 23.6% had a female householder with no husband present, and 27.9% were non-families. 26.4% of all households were made up of individuals, and 15.6% had someone living alone who was 65 years of age or older. The average household size was 2.38 and the average family size was 2.84.

In the town, the population was spread out, with 25.1% under the age of 18, 8.1% from 18 to 24, 23.2% from 25 to 44, 21.6% from 45 to 64, and 22.0% who were 65 years of age or older. The median age was 39 years. For every 100 females, there were 73.0 males. For every 100 females age 18 and over, there were 66.4 males.

The median income for a household in the town was $23,983, and the median income for a family was $28,047. Males had a median income of $27,917 versus $20,292 for females. The per capita income for the town was $14,294. About 23.2% of families and 25.2% of the population were below the poverty line, including 41.1% of those under age 18 and 16.9% of those age 65 or over.

== Education ==
Calhoun City is served by the Calhoun County School District. Calhoun City High School's athletic teams are known as the Wildcats.

In 1968, Calhoun Academy was formed as a segregation academy by white parents seeking to avoid sending their children to racially integrated public schools. Its sports teams are known as the Cougars.

== Notable people ==
- Ace Cannon, saxophone player and Mississippi Musicians Hall of Fame inductee
- Billy Cowan, former Major League Baseball player
- M. D. Jennings, defensive back for the Green Bay Packers
- Vester Newcomb, former National Football League player and head football coach of University of Tennessee at Martin from 1978 to 1979
- Dave Parker, former Major League Baseball player
- Scott Suber, former Mississippi State first-team All-American
- Cornelius Wortham, former National Football League and Alabama Crimson Tide player
