= Skuna River =

Tributary of the Yalobusha River in north-central Mississippi

Coordinates: 33.8751°N 89.7112°W

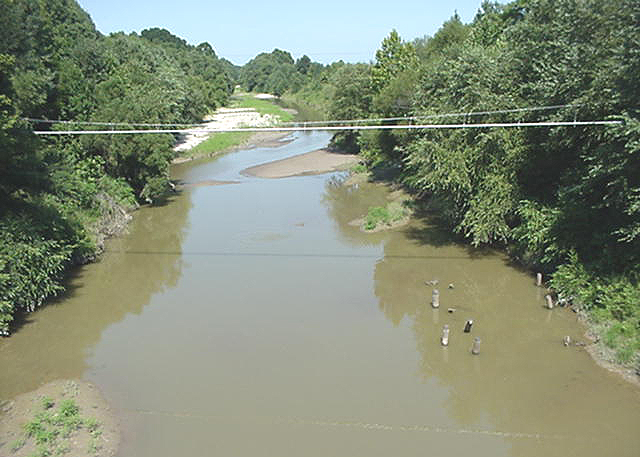
The Skuna River at Bruce

The Skuna River is a tributary of the Yalobusha River, about 75 mi (121 km) long, in north-central Mississippi in the United States. Via the Yalobusha and Yazoo Rivers, it is part of the watershed of the Mississippi River.

== Course ==
The Skuna River rises about 4 mi (6.4 km) west of Pontotoc in Pontotoc County and flows generally southwestwardly through Chickasaw and Calhoun Counties, past the town of Bruce. Most of the river's course has been channelized, and it is also known as the "Skuna River Canal." It joins the Yalobusha River 6 mi (9.7 km) east of Grenada, as the north arm of Grenada Lake, which is formed by a U.S. Army Corps of Engineers dam on the Yalobusha. The Skuna has an average discharge of 620 cubic feet per second at Coffeeville, MS.

== Name ==
Skuna is a name derived from the Choctaw language purported to mean "entrails, guts".

The United States Board on Geographic Names settled on "Skuna River" as the stream's name on February 3, 1926. According to the Geographic Names Information System, it has also been known as:

- Loosa Schoona
- Loosa Shooner Creek
- Schoona
- Schooner
- Scoona Creek
- Scoopa Creek
- Scuna
- Shooner

Henry S. Tanner's 1848 map of Mississippi has the waterway labeled "Lussascoona R."

Thomas B. Ives's hand-drawn 1845 map of the waterways between the Mississippi River and Grenada, Mississippi has it labeled "Lussascona."

== See also ==
- List of Mississippi rivers

== Sources ==
- Columbia Gazetteer of North America entry
- DeLorme (1998). Mississippi Atlas & Gazetteer. Yarmouth, Maine: DeLorme. ISBN 0-89933-346-X.
- U.S. Geological Survey Geographic Names Information System: Skuna River
- U.S. Geological Survey Geographic Names Information System: Skuna River Canal
