= Larry Stewart (philanthropist) =

American philanthropist

- Born: April 1, 1948; Bruce, Mississippi, U.S.
- Died: January 12, 2007 (aged 58); Missouri, U.S.

Larry Stewart (April 1, 1948 – January 12, 2007) was an American philanthropist from Kansas City better known as "Kansas City's Secret Santa". After poor beginnings, Stewart – from 1979 through 2006 – made a practice of anonymously handing out small amounts of cash, typically in the form of hundred-dollar bills, to needy people.

== Background ==
Stewart was given a free breakfast from owner Ted Horn at Dixie Diner in Houston, Mississippi, in 1971 when he was down on his luck, allegedly inspiring Stewart's personal tradition. The whole story is that Larry intended to "dine and dash" because he had no money. Mr. Horn noticed his anxious demeanor and figured out that Larry had no money. Ted walked up behind Larry and said "I believe you dropped this sir" as he handed him a $20 bill that he pretended to pick up off the floor behind him. This in turn began with an impromptu act of kindness by Stewart. He was fired just before Christmas two years in a row, both in 1978 and 1979. Around Christmas of 1979, while nursing his wounds at a drive-in restaurant during a very cold day, he noticed a carhop working the cars outside. He recalled, "It was cold and this carhop didn't have on a very big jacket, and I thought to myself, 'I think I got it bad. She's out there in this cold making nickels and dimes.'" He gave her $20 and told her to keep the change. "And suddenly I saw her lips begin to tremble and tears begin to flow down her cheeks. She said, 'Sir, you have no idea what this means to me.'"

Although he had also donated money to community charities in Kansas City and his hometown of Bruce, Mississippi, he believed in handing out cash directly to people in need because it is something people do not have to, as he said, "beg for, get in line for, or apply for".

== Philanthropy ==
Stewart made his fortune through cable television and long-distance calling. He kept his identity hidden until 2006, when he was diagnosed with esophageal cancer, which later claimed his life. Many suspected that his illness was the reason he decided to "out" himself, but according to Stewart, this is untrue. In an interview on The Dave Ramsey Show, Stewart said he came out because a tabloid was about to reveal his identity, and he wanted to tell his own story before they did.

Stewart's acts of kindness were not restricted to the Kansas City area. He has traveled to other metropolitan areas during times of local tragedy. He went to New York City in 2001 after September 11, and to Mississippi in 2005 after Hurricane Katrina devastated the area. After his illness, he began "training" other secret Santas, who were scheduled to give out $65,000 during the 2006 holiday season, in addition to the money Stewart gave out.

His philanthropy has been supported and recognized by a number of well-known people, including Buck O'Neil, George Brett, Oprah Winfrey, and, in 2006 in Chicago, Dick Butkus (who had helped Larry as an "elf" since 2003).

== Death and legacy ==
Stewart died on January 12, 2007, from esophageal cancer, aged 58. Since Stewart's death, his example has inspired others to continue his mission of philanthropy and of being a "secret Santa". On Saturday, January 13, 2007, the day after he died, Stewart was given (posthumously) the 2006 John "Buck" O'Neil Award, which is one of several "Legacy Awards" presented by the Negro Leagues Baseball Museum (NLBM). The "Buck O'Neil Award" is presented to a local or national corporate/private philanthropist for Outstanding Support of the NLBM.

In 2014, an anonymous wealthy businessman, carrying on Stewart's tradition, deputized officers in the Jackson County sheriff’s office to hand out $100 to "deserving suspects": people they identified as likely to especially benefit, for example driving with dented cars. Another goal was helping to heal a rift opening up between the public and the police in the wake of the 2014 shooting of Michael Brown.

== See also ==
- Random act of kindness
