= Bruce, Mississippi =

- Town
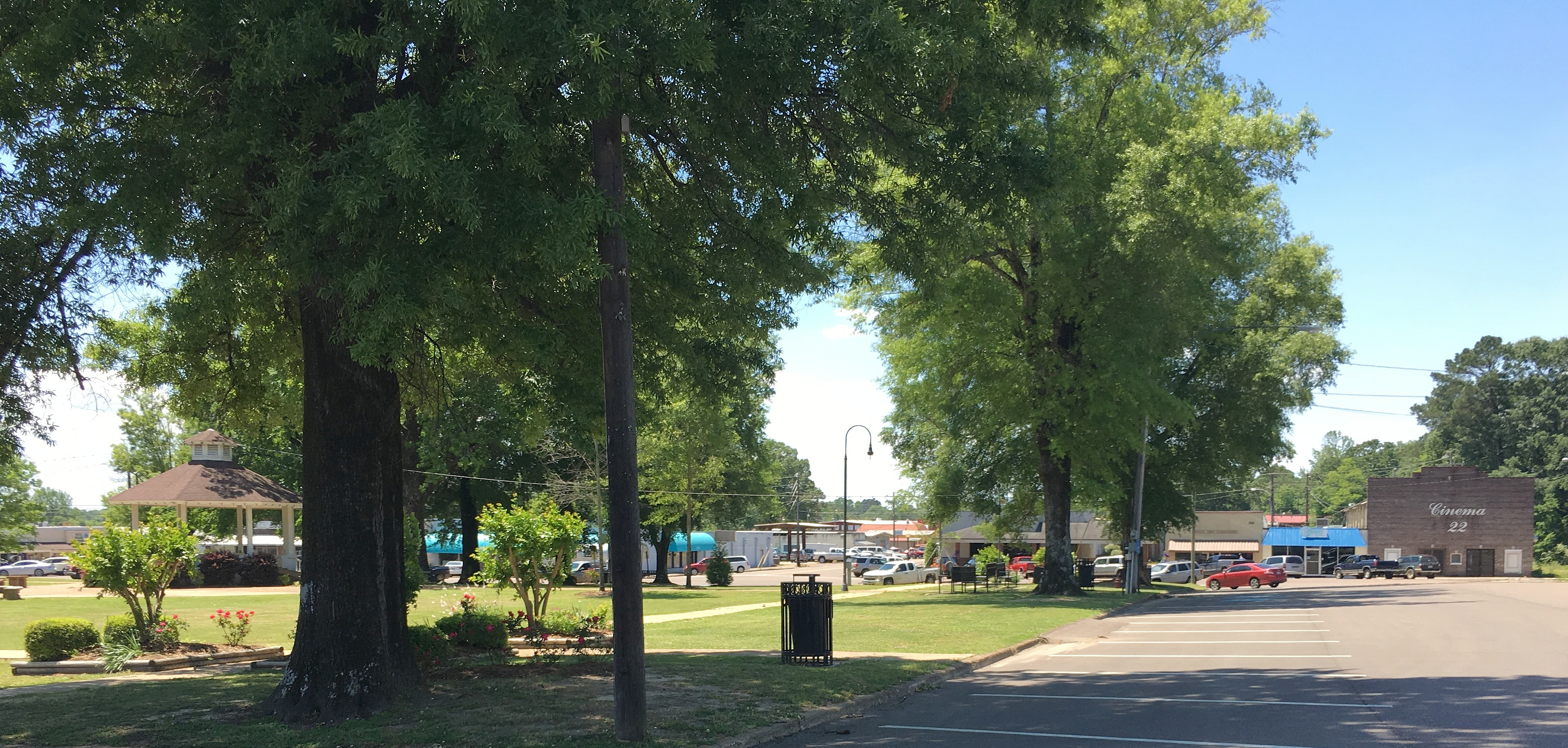
- Public square in downtown Bruce

- Flag

- Location of Bruce, Mississippi

- Location in the United States
- Coordinates: 33°59′31″N 89°20′32″W
- Country: United States
- State: Mississippi
- County: Calhoun

Area
  - Total: 2.44 sq mi (6.31 km^{2})
  - Land: 2.44 sq mi (6.31 km^{2})
  - Water: 0 sq mi (0.00 km^{2})
- Elevation: 276 ft (84 m)

Population (2020)
  - Total: 1,707
  - Density: 700.7/sq mi (270.53/km^{2})
- Time zone: UTC-6 (Central (CST))
  - Summer (DST): UTC-5 (CDT)
- ZIP code: 38915
- Area code: 662
- FIPS code: 28-09180
- GNIS feature ID: 0667656
- Website: www.cityofbruce.org

Bruce is a town situated along the Skuna River in Calhoun County, Mississippi, United States. As of the 2020 census, it had a population of 1,707. Currently, Jimmy Hubbard is the mayor.

== History ==
The town was named for E. L. Bruce, founder of the E. L. Bruce Company, a sawmill operation. The sawmill industry is still vital in the town, with Weyerhaeuser operating a mill. Bruce is also home to other timber-related businesses.

== Geography ==
Bruce is located in north-central Calhoun County. Mississippi Highway 9 runs through the center of town, leading south 4 miles (6 km) to Pittsboro, the county seat, 10 miles (16 km) south to Calhoun City, and northeast 31 miles (50 km) to Pontotoc. Mississippi Highway 32 crosses Highway 9 in the center of Bruce and leads east 21 miles (34 km) to New Houlka and northwest 26 miles (42 km) to Water Valley.

According to the United States Census Bureau, Bruce has a total area of 2.4 square miles (6.3 km^{2}), all land. The Skuna River, a tributary of the Yalobusha River and then the Yazoo River, passes south of the town.

== Demographics ==
Historical population
Census	Pop.	Note	%±
1930	946		—
1940	1,385		46.4%
1950	1,719		24.1%
1960	1,698		−1.2%
1970	2,033		19.7%
1980	2,208		8.6%
1990	2,127		−3.7%
2000	2,097		−1.4%
2010	1,939		−7.5%
2020	1,707		−12.0%
U.S. Decennial Census

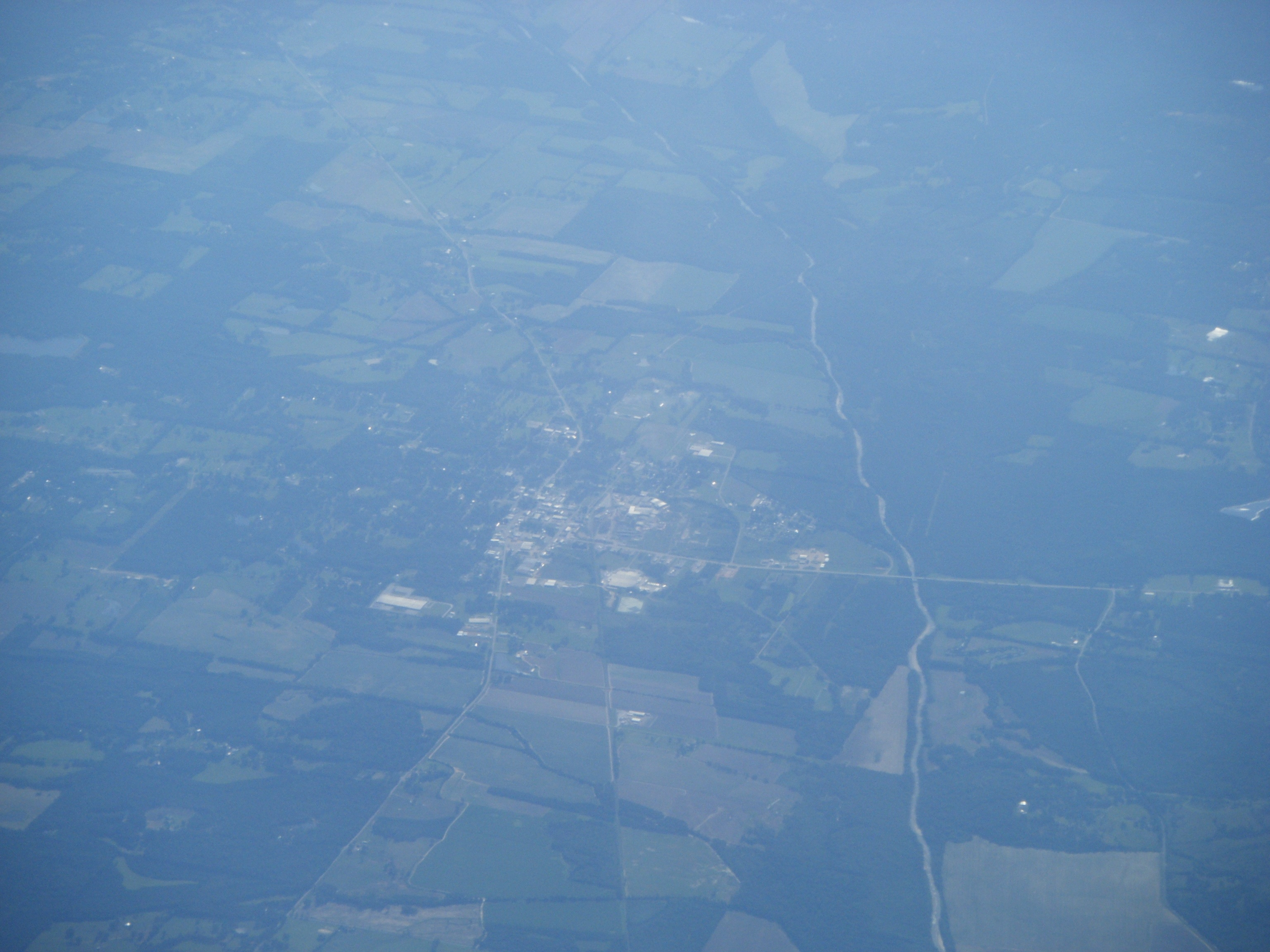
Aerial view of Bruce

=== 2020 census ===
As of the 2020 census, Bruce had a population of 1,707. The median age was 45.1 years. 21.1% of residents were under the age of 18 and 21.0% of residents were 65 years of age or older. For every 100 females there were 88.4 males, and for every 100 females age 18 and over there were 86.4 males age 18 and over.

0.0% of residents lived in urban areas, while 100.0% lived in rural areas.

There were 795 households in Bruce, including 335 family households. Of all households, 25.4% had children under the age of 18 living in them. Of all households, 27.4% were married-couple households, 25.0% were households with a male householder and no spouse or partner present, and 42.6% were households with a female householder and no spouse or partner present. About 45.5% of all households were made up of individuals and 21.4% had someone living alone who was 65 years of age or older.

There were 921 housing units, of which 13.7% were vacant. The homeowner vacancy rate was 2.0% and the rental vacancy rate was 10.3%.

Racial composition as of the 2020 census
Race	Number	Percent
White	890	52.1%
Black or African American	719	42.1%
American Indian and Alaska Native	6	0.4%
Asian	1	0.1%
Native Hawaiian and Other Pacific Islander	0	0.0%
Some other race	26	1.5%
Two or more races	65	3.8%
Hispanic or Latino (of any race)	59	3.5%

=== 2000 census ===
As of the census of 2000, there were 2,097 people, 889 households, and 562 families residing in the town. The population density was 818.8 inhabitants per square mile (316.1/km^{2}). There were 1,005 housing units at an average density of 392.4 per square mile (151.5/km^{2}). The racial makeup of the town was 53.27% White, 44.35% African American, 0.52% Native American, 0.86% from other races, and 1.00% from two or more races. Hispanic or Latino of any race were 1.19% of the population.

There were 889 households, out of which 28.9% had children under the age of 18 living with them, 37.3% were married couples living together, 22.2% had a female householder with no husband present, and 36.7% were non-families. 34.9% of all households were made up of individuals, and 17.3% had someone living alone who was 65 years of age or older. The average household size was 2.32 and the average family size was 2.98.

In the town, the population was spread out, with 27.8% under the age of 18, 8.2% from 18 to 24, 25.1% from 25 to 44, 21.7% from 45 to 64, and 17.2% who were 65 years of age or older. The median age was 36 years. For every 100 females, there were 86.7 males. For every 100 females age 18 and over, there were 79.0 males.

The median income for a household in the town was $20,417, and the median income for a family was $31,806. Males had a median income of $34,063 versus $21,380 for females. The per capita income for the town was $14,233. About 20.1% of families and 29.3% of the population were below the poverty line, including 46.6% of those under age 18 and 26.6% of those age 65 or over.

== Education ==
The town of Bruce is served by the Calhoun County School District. There are three public schools in the district: Bruce, Calhoun City, and Vardaman. Bruce is a Level 5 High School, which is the highest academic ranking in Mississippi. Calhoun City is slightly smaller than Bruce High School. Bruce and Calhoun City High are both District 2A schools, and Vardaman High is a District 1A school.

The Bruce Trojan High School baseball team were 2A State Champions in 2012, the Bruce Lady Trojan High basketball team were 2A State Champions in 1998 and 2002, and the Bruce Trojan High School football team were 2A State Champions in 1996.

== Notable people ==
- Charles Beckett, former member of the Mississippi House of Representatives
- Ron Lundy, former WABC-AM and WCBS-FM disc jockey
- Armegis Spearman, former National Football League player and former Ole Miss (University of Mississippi) linebacker
- Larry Stewart, philanthropist known for being the original Secret Santa
- Frederick Thomas, former National Football League player
- Leo Welch, blues musician
