= Great River Road State Park =

State park in Mississippi, United States

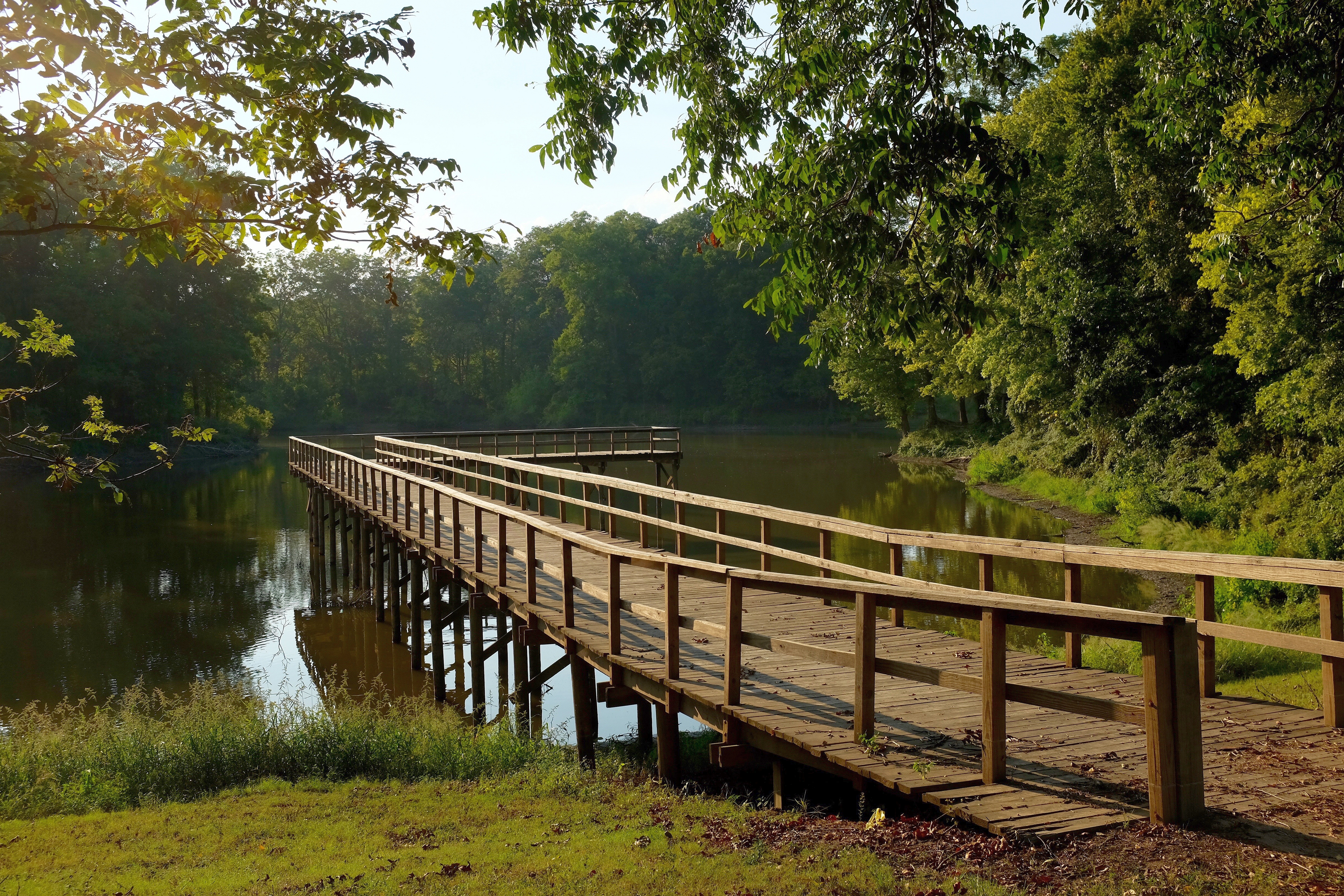

- Location within Mississippi
- Location: Rosedale, Mississippi, United States
- Coordinates: 33°50′34″N 91°02′08″W
- Administrator: City of Rosedale
- Designation: Mississippi state park
- Named for: The Great River Road
- Website: Official website

Great River Road State Park is a public recreation area in the U.S. state of Mississippi located off Mississippi Highway 1 in the southwest corner of the city of Rosedale. The day-use state park is managed by the city of Rosedale.

== Activities and amenities ==
The state park features boating and fishing on 25-acre (10 ha) Perry Martin Lake as well as picnicking facilities and a playground. The park's 75-foot (23 m) lookout tower which offered views of the Mississippi River was taken down following the damaging floods of 2011.
