= Hugh White State Park =

State park in Mississippi, United States

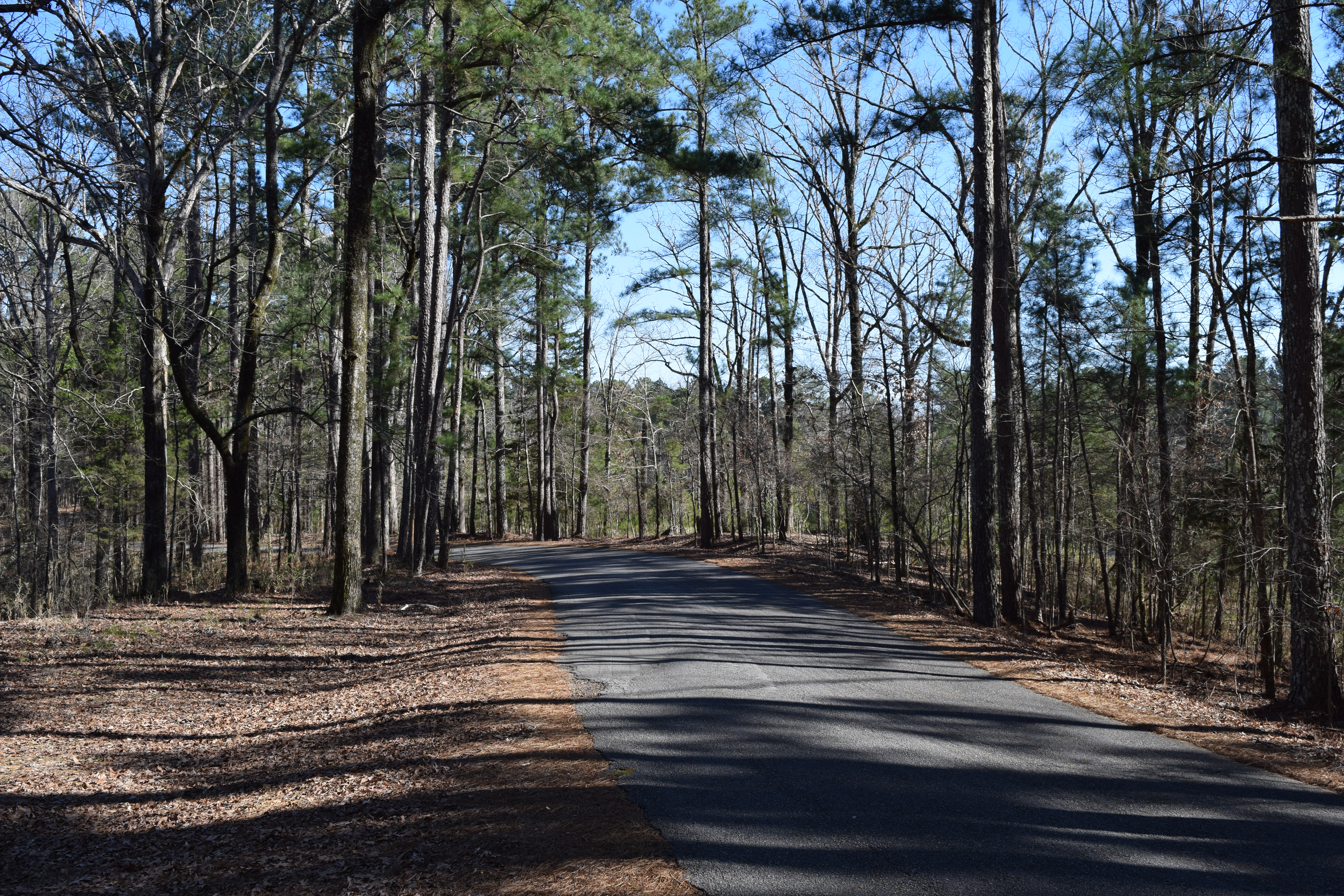

- Location within Mississippi
- Location: Grenada County, Mississippi, United States
- Coordinates: 33°48′00″N 89°44′00″W
- Elevation: 312 ft (95 m)
- Administrator: Mississippi Department of Wildlife, Fisheries, and Parks
- Designation: Mississippi state park
- Named for: Governor Hugh L. White
- Website: Official website

Hugh White State Park is a public recreation area in the U.S. state of Mississippi. The state park is located off Mississippi Highway 8, five miles (8.0 km) east of Grenada. It is named after Hugh L. White, a former governor of Mississippi.

== Activities and amenities ==
The park features boating, waterskiing and fishing on 64,000-acre (26,000 ha) Grenada Lake, 158 developed campsites, 12 duplex cabins, visitors center, picnic area, and an 18-hole regulation golf course, The Dogwoods.
