= Topashaw Creek =

Stream in Mississippi, United States

Coordinates: 33.8390032°N 89.3275727°W

Topashaw Creek is a stream in the U.S. state of Mississippi. It is a tributary to the Yalobusha River.

Topashaw is a name derived from the Choctaw language purported to mean either (sources vary) "little chestnut tree" or named after the Taposa people. Variant names are "Tapashaw Creek", "Topasaw Creek", "Topisaw Creek", "Toposhaw Creek", and "Tupashaw Creek".
