= Batupan Bogue =

Stream in Mississippi, U.S.

Coordinates: 33°47′13″N 89°47′38″W

Batupan Bogue is a stream in the U.S. state of Mississippi. It is a tributary to the Yalobusha River. It has an average discharge of 409 cubic feet per second near Grenada, MS.

== Name ==
Batupan Bogue is a name derived from the Choctaw language.

Its many variant names include:

- Bataupan River Bogue
- Batawpan Bogue
- Batupan Bogue Creek
- Batupan River
- Batupon Bogue
- Beacapon Bogue Creek
- Big Bogue Creek
- Bogue Creek
- Worsham Creek
