= Grenada Municipal Airport =

Airport in Mississippi, US

Grenada Municipal Airport (former Grenada Army Airfield)
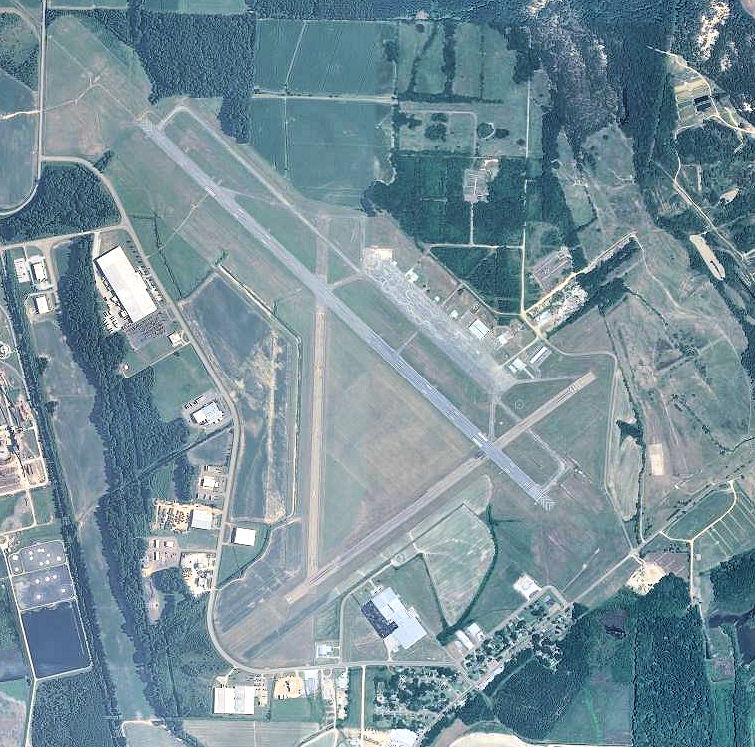
- USGS 2006 orthophoto
- IATA: none; ICAO: KGNF; FAA LID: GNF

Summary
- Airport type: Public
- Owner: City of Grenada
- Serves: Grenada, Mississippi
- Elevation AMSL: 208 ft (63 m)
- Coordinates: 33°49′57″N 89°47′53″W
- Website: GrenadaAirport.net

Map
- Location of airport in Mississippi KGNF (the United States)

Runways
Direction	Length		Surface
Direction	ft	m	Surface
13/31	7,000	2,134	Asphalt
4/22	4,998	1,523	Asphalt

Statistics (2012)
- Aircraft operations: 5,000
- Based aircraft: 10
- Source: Federal Aviation Administration

Grenada Municipal Airport (ICAO: KGNF, FAA LID: GNF) is a public use airport in Grenada County, Mississippi, United States. It is owned by the City of Grenada and located three nautical miles (6 km) north of the central business district. This airport is included in the National Plan of Integrated Airport Systems for 2011–2015, which categorized it as a general aviation facility. There is no scheduled commercial airline service.

Although many U.S. airports use the same three-letter location identifier for the FAA and IATA, this airport is assigned GNF by the FAA but has no designation from the IATA (which assigned GNF to Gansner Field in Quincy, California).

== History ==
Built during 1943 and opened in February 1944, the airport was known as the Grenada Army Airfield during World War II, the United States Army Air Forces Army Air Forces Training Command.

Grenada Army Airfield's primary mission was described as follows: A. The deliver Army ground force combat teams at strategic points by: a. Parachute troops and equipment b. Delivering gliders with troops and equipment B. The field's secondary mission was: a. Reinforcement and re-supply of ground troops b. Evacuation of wounded

The field consisted of three runways - all of which were approximately 5,000 feet (1,500 m) long. The ramp and taxi strips were concrete-ramp being 500 feet (150 m) by 3,000 feet (910 m) long. By the time the program was completed, fifty C-47 airplanes and 25 CG-4A gliders were brought to Grenada field to be serviced and prepared for use.

Troop Carrier Command assigned the following groups to the airfield for the purpose of training replacement crews.

- 63d Troop Carrier Group, 3 June 1943-10 January 1944
- 10th Troop Carrier Group, 21 January-8 March 1944

The headquarters unit on the airfield was the 443d Base Headquarters Squadron. In 1945 Troop Carrier Command moved out and the airfield was turned over to Air Technical Service Command. Initially it was used as a prisoner of war camp, the last POWs being released at the end of 1945. ATSC then used the base for surplus aircraft storage and as a military air freight transshipment point for many years.

In 1953 the airfield was turned over to John Mason Boyd (Boyd Construction Company) and became known as the Grenada Municipal Airport. The military has since made improvements to the field and jointly uses it with civil aviation.

== Facilities and aircraft ==
Grenada Municipal Airport covers an area of 656 acres (265 ha) at an elevation of 208 feet (63 m) above mean sea level. It has two runways with asphalt surfaces: 13/31 is 7,000 by 150 feet (2,134 x 46 m) and 4/22 is 4,998 by 99 feet (1,523 x 30 m).

For the 12-month period ending January 5, 2012, the airport had 5,000 aircraft operations, an average of 13 per day: 68% general aviation and 32% military. At that time there were 10 single-engine aircraft based at this airport.

== See also ==
- Mississippi World War II Army Airfields
- I Troop Carrier Command
- List of airports in Mississippi
