= Grenada Lake =

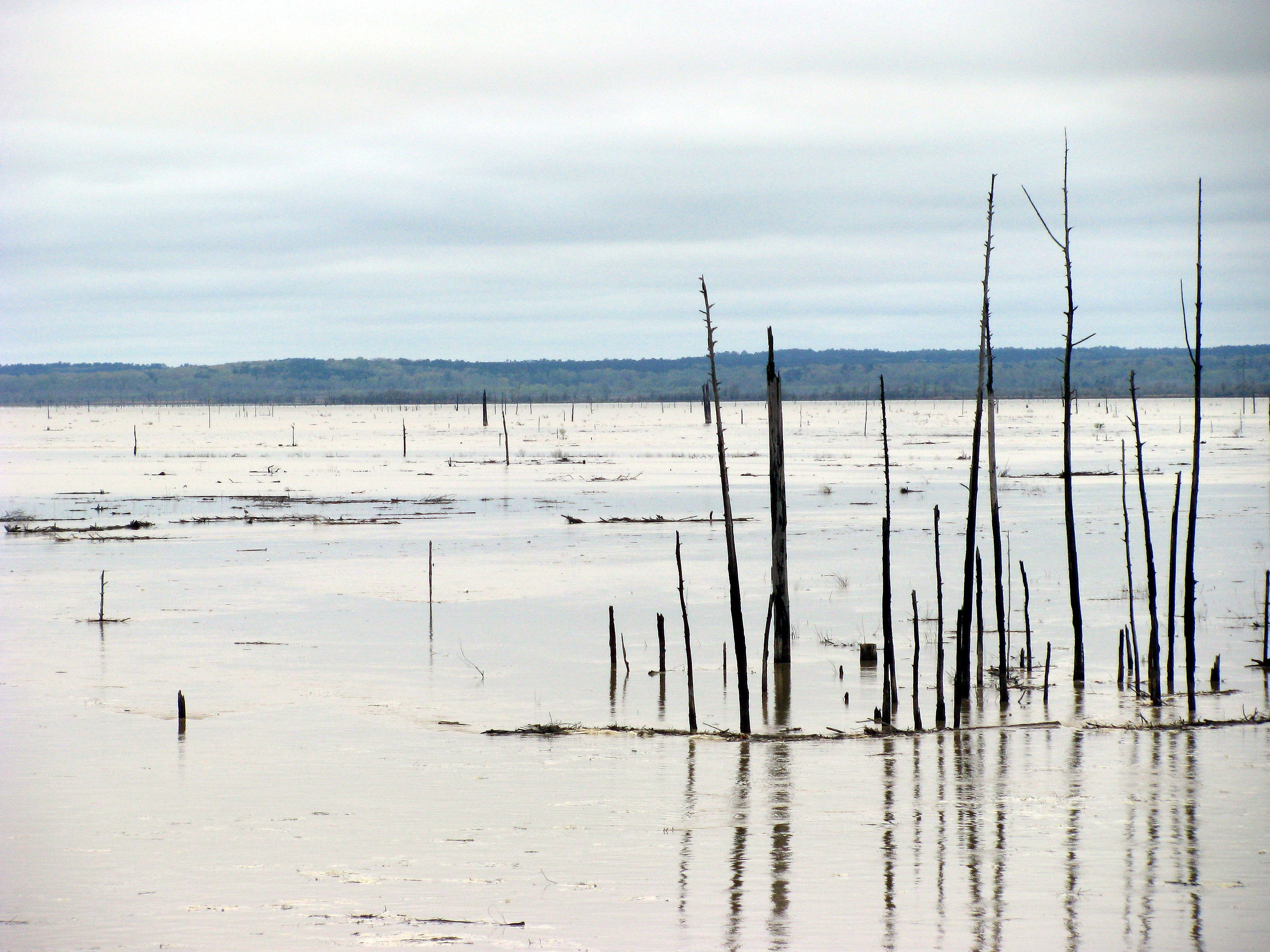
- The northern end of Grenada Lake

- Location within Mississippi Location within the United States
- Location: Grenada / Yalobusha counties, Mississippi, United States
- Coordinates: 33°49′10″N 89°46′25″W
- Type: reservoir
- Primary inflows: Yalobusha River
- Primary outflows: Yalobusha River
- Basin countries: United States
- First flooded: 1954
- Surface area: 35,000 acres (140 km^{2})
- Shore length^{1}: 148 miles (238 km)
- Surface elevation: 217 ft (66 m)
- ^{1} Shore length is not a well-defined measure.

Grenada Lake is a reservoir on the Yalobusha River in the U.S. state of Mississippi. It is one of four flood control lakes in North Mississippi constructed by the U.S. Army Corps of Engineers. Grenada Lake was constructed to help control flooding along the Yazoo River Basin. The dam is located on the Yalobusha River approximately 3 miles (5 km) northeast of Grenada, Mississippi.

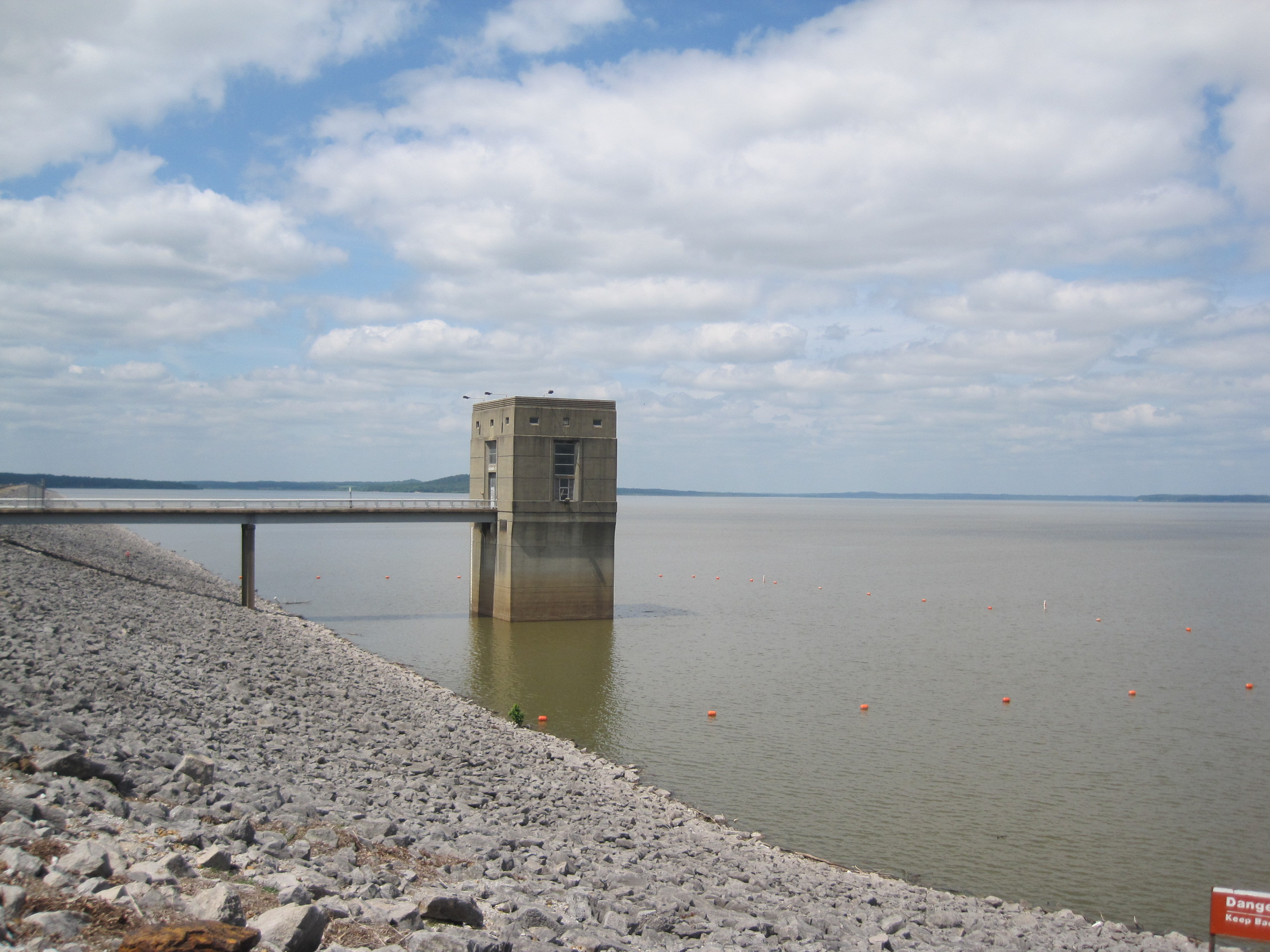
Grenada Dam intake structure

The operation of Grenada Lake began in 1954 after a cost of $32 million to construct. The elevation of the top of the earthen-filled dam is 256 feet (78 m) NGVD. The Grenada Project encompasses 90,427 acres (366 km^{2}) with 35,000 acres (140 km^{2}) of this in water during the recreation season (215 NGVD). At this elevation the lake has approximately 48 mi (77 km) of shoreline.

Flood control is the primary purpose of the Grenada Lake Project. The Mississippi River Basin Flood Control Project was the direct result of the Great Flood of 1927. The levees which were the only protection against flooding at the time, broke along the Mississippi and Arkansas Rivers, literally swamping thousands of acres of land in Mississippi, Louisiana, and Arkansas.

Even though the Corps of Engineers main objective is flood control, Federal Legislation calls for other activities on Corps of Engineers Lands. Since its impoundment, Grenada Lake has attracted an ever-increasing number of visitors who enjoy water-based and other outdoor recreational activities and is host to several fishing tournaments annually as well.

Grenada Lake is the home to Hugh White State Park and its associated Carver Point Group Camp. Many other campgrounds are located around the lake.
