= Yalobusha River =

Coordinates: 33°33′9″N 90°10′51″W

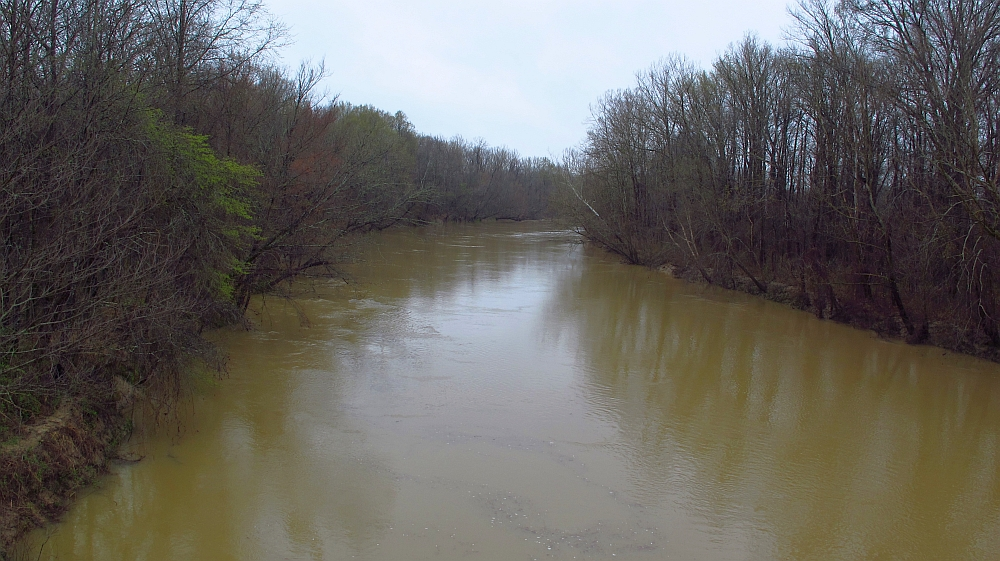
Yalobusha River at Robinson Bayou Road in Leflore County, Mississippi.

The Yalobusha River is a river, 165 miles (266 km) long, in north-central Mississippi in the United States. It is a principal tributary of the Yazoo River, via which it is part of the watershed of the Mississippi River.

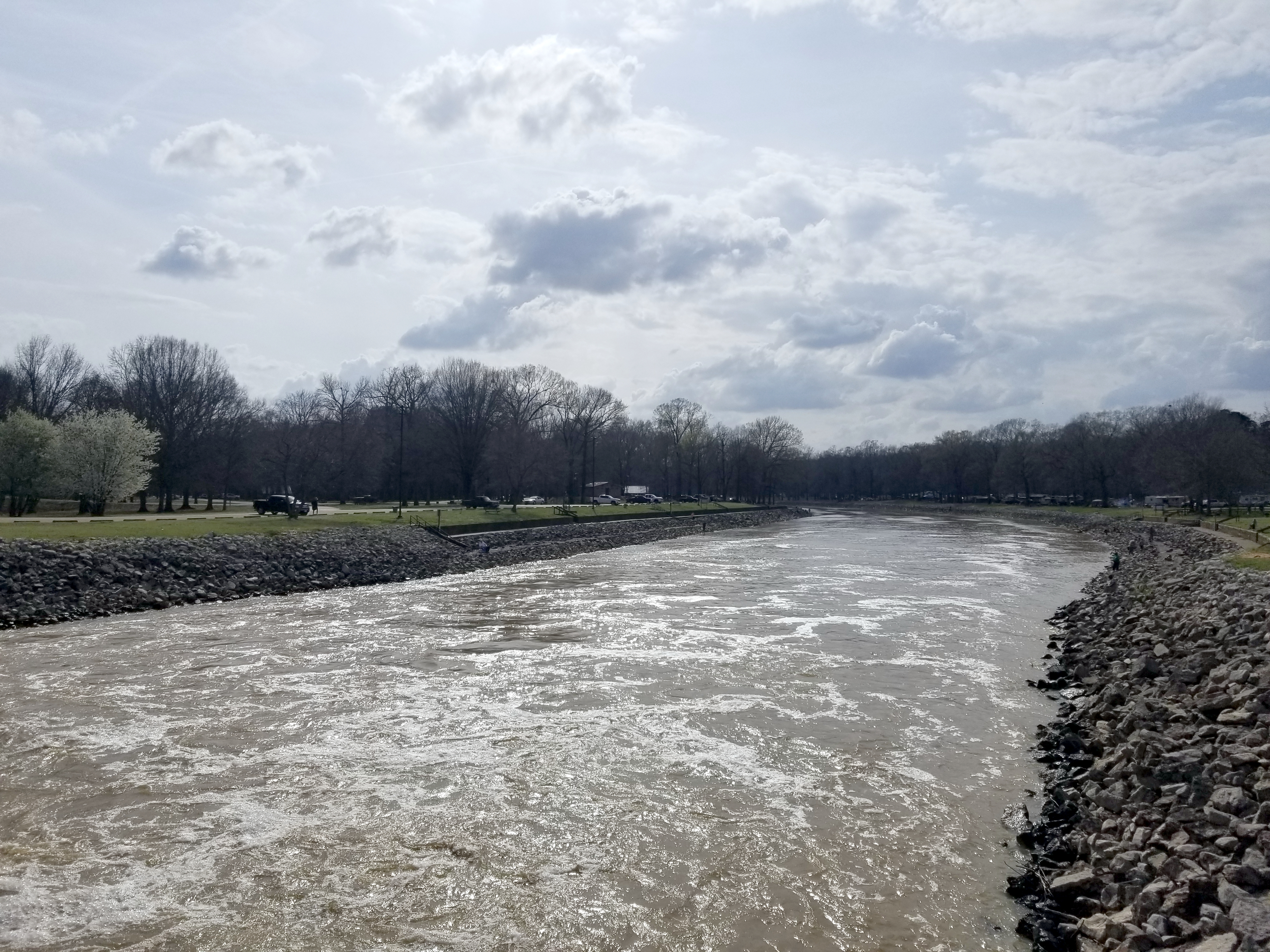
Yalobusha River outlet channel at Grenada Lake in Grenada County, Mississippi

The name "Yalobusha" comes from the Choctaw word yalooboshi, meaning "little tadpole", from yalooba, "tadpole", and -ushi, "diminutive". The United States Board on Geographic Names settled on the river's name in 1892. According to the Geographic Names Information System, it has also been known as "Yallabusha" and as the "Yellowbushy River."

== Course ==
The Yalobusha River rises in Chickasaw County, northwest of the town of Houston, and flows generally west-southwestwardly through Calhoun, Grenada and Leflore Counties, past the town of Grenada. At Greenwood it joins the Tallahatchie River to form the Yazoo River.

Much of the Yalobusha's course through Calhoun County has been straightened and channelized; this section of the river is also known as the "Yalobusha River Canal." In Grenada County, the river is impounded by a U.S. Army Corps of Engineers dam to form Grenada Lake, which collects the Yalobusha's largest tributary, the Skuna River. The Yalobusha at Grenada, MS averages a discharge of 2,436 cubic feet per second.

== Major tributaries ==
- Big Sand Creek
- Skuna River
- Batupan Bogue
- Topashaw Creek

== See also ==
- List of Mississippi rivers

== Sources ==
- Columbia Gazetter of North America entry
- DeLorme (1998). Mississippi Atlas & Gazetteer. Yarmouth, Maine: DeLorme. ISBN 0-89933-346-X.
- U.S. Geological Survey Geographic Names Information System: Yalobusha River Canal
