= Mississippi Highway 341 =

Highway in Mississippi

Mississippi Highway 341

Route information
- Maintained by MDOT
- Length: 44.871 mi (72.213 km)
- Existed: 1956–present

Major junctions
- South end: Hohenlinden Road at the Webster-Chickasaw county line
- MS 8 in Vardaman; MS 32 near Buckhorn
- North end: MS 9 near Pontotoc

Location
- Country: United States
- State: Mississippi
- Counties: Calhoun, Chickasaw, Pontotoc

Highway system
- Mississippi State Highway System; Interstate; US; State
| ← MS 340 | → MS 342 |

Mississippi Highway 341 (MS 341) is a 44.871-mile-long (72.213 km) north–south state highway in the North Central Hills region of northern Mississippi, connecting Hohenlinden (via Atlanta and Vardaman) with MS 9 near Pontotoc.

== Route description ==
MS 341 begins in Chickasaw County at the Webster County line (located at bridge over Dry Creek), where the road continues south into the community of Hohenlinden as Hohenlinden Road. It travels northeast through farmland for a few miles before climbing up some wooded hills, where it becomes concurrent (overlapped) with MS 340. The highway winds its way north through these wooded hills for a couple miles, where MS 340 splits off along an unmarked dirt road (County Road 407, CR 407), and MS 341 descends into a narrow valley just long enough to pass through the community of Atlanta (where it makes a sharp left turn). MS 341 now climbs some more hills to cross into Calhoun County.

MS 341 descends into another valley and heads north through farmland for several miles, where it crosses the Yalobusha River, before entering the town of Vardaman, immediately having an intersection with MS 8. The highway travels straight through the center of downtown (via a one way pair), then neighborhoods, along Main Street before leaving Vardaman and traveling north through farmland for several more miles to cross a wooded ridge, where it passes through the community of Reid, before crossing the Skuna River and having a short concurrency with MS 32. MS 341 climbs up some more wooded hills before entering Pontotoc County.

MS 341 lowers back down into a valley (the same one as last time) and meanders its way northeast through farmland for several miles, where it makes a sharp left in the community of Buckhorn, before coming to an end at an intersection with MS 9, just a half mile west of the Pontotoc city limits.

The entire length of Mississippi Highway 341 is a rural, two-lane, state highway.

== Major intersections ==
| County | Location | mi | km | Destinations | Notes |
|---|---|---|---|---|---|
| Chickasaw | | 0.0 | 0.0 | Hohenlinden Road – Hohenlinden | Southern terminus; south end of state maintenance |
| Chickasaw | | 2.2 | 3.5 | MS 340 east – Woodland | Southern end of unsigned MS 340 concurrency |
| Chickasaw | | 2.9 | 4.7 | CR 407 (MS 340 west) – Derma | Northern end of unsigned MS 340 concurrency |
| Calhoun | Vardaman | 11.6 | 18.7 | MS 8 – Calhoun City, Derma, Houston | |
| Calhoun | | 24.9 | 40.1 | MS 32 east – New Houlka | Southern end of MS 32 concurrency |
| Calhoun | | 26.6 | 42.8 | MS 32 west – Bruce | Northern terminus of MS 32 concurrency |
| Pontotoc | | 44.9 | 72.3 | MS 9 – Bruce, Pontotoc | Northern terminus |
1.000 mi = 1.609 km; 1.000 km = 0.621 mi: Concurrency terminus
