= Mississippi Highway 340 =

Highway in Mississippi

Mississippi Highway 340

Route information
- Maintained by Chickasaw County and MDOT
- Length: 10.144 mi (16.325 km)
- Existed: 1960–present

Major junctions
- West end: CR 418 at the Calhoun–Chickasaw county line near Riley Ball Home
- MS 341 near Atlanta
- East end: MS 15 in Woodland

Location
- Country: United States
- State: Mississippi
- Counties: Chickasaw

Highway system
- Mississippi State Highway System; Interstate; US; State
← MS 338	→ MS 341

Mississippi Highway 340 (MS 340) is a west–east state highway in Chickasaw County, Mississippi, running from the Calhoun County line to MS 15 in Woodland.

== Route description ==
MS 340 begins at the Calhoun County line, directly beside a small reservoir. It heads east as an unsigned, locally maintained dirt road (County Road 407, CR 407) for nearly four miles (6.4 km) through rural farmland to an intersection with MS 341, which it becomes concurrent with MS 341 and state maintenance begins. The two wind their way south as a paved two-lane highway through some wooded hills before MS 341 splits off and heads south toward Hohenlinden, with MS 340 becoming signed as it heads east. MS 340 travels northeastward through a mix of farmland and wooded areas for several miles to enter the village of Woodland along Market Street. It makes a sharp right onto Logan Street at the center of town, continuing 0.4 miles before coming to an end at an intersection with MS 15 at the eastern edge of the village.

== Major intersections ==
The entire route is in Chickasaw County.

Location	mi	km	Destinations	Notes
	0.000	0.000	CR 418 west	Western terminus; continuation into Calhoun County; Locally-maintained section begins
	3.797	6.111	MS 341 north	Locally-maintained section ends; western end of MS 341 overlap; begin state maintenance
	4.535	7.298	MS 341 south	Eastern end of MS 341 overlap
Woodland	10.144	16.325	MS 15 – Houston, Mathiston	Eastern terminus
1.000 mi = 1.609 km; 1.000 km = 0.621 mi: Concurrency terminus
