= National Register of Historic Places listings in Chickasaw County, Mississippi =

Location of Chickasaw County in Mississippi

This is a list of the National Register of Historic Places listings in Chickasaw County, Mississippi.

This is intended to be a complete list of the properties and districts on the National Register of Historic Places in Chickasaw County, Mississippi, United States. Latitude and longitude coordinates are provided for many National Register properties and districts; these locations may be seen together in a map.

There are 10 properties and districts listed on the National Register in the county.

This National Park Service list is complete through NPS recent listings posted May 23, 2025.

== Current listings ==
	Name on the Register	Image	Date listed	Location	City or town	Description
1	Bynum Mound and Village Site (22CS501)	Bynum Mound and Village Site (22CS501)	July 16, 1989 (#89000783)	Mile 232.4 on the Natchez Trace Parkway; 33°53′53″N 88°56′53″W	Houston	
2	Elliott-Donaldson House	Elliott-Donaldson House	September 15, 1980 (#80002203)	109 N. Church Street; 34°00′24″N 88°45′24″W	Okolona	Constructed c. 1850
3	Houston Carnegie Library	Houston Carnegie Library	December 22, 1978 (#78001593)	105 W. Madison; 33°53′47″N 89°00′03″W	Houston	Constructed in 1909
4	Houston Historic District	Houston Historic District	May 14, 2013 (#13000300)	Depot, Monroe, Madison & Pontotoc Sts. 33°53′49″N 89°00′00″W	Houston	
5	Judge Bates House	Judge Bates House	May 6, 1982 (#82003097)	330 South Monroe Street; 33°53′46″N 89°00′01″W	Houston	Constructed c. 1845
6	Merchants and Farmers Bank Building		May 14, 1987 (#87000733)	423 Main Street; 34°00′15″N 88°44′56″W	Okolona	Demolished
7	Okolona College	Okolona College	August 9, 2002 (#02000853)	654 MS-245; 34°01′04″N 88°45′27″W	Okolona	A former college for African-Americans
8	Okolona Historic District	Okolona Historic District	February 5, 2002 (#01001561)	Roughly bounded by Fleming, Monroe, Buchanan, and Washington Sts. 34°00′18″N 88°45′03″W	Okolona	
9	Owl Creek Site	Owl Creek Site	August 1, 1975 (#75001042)	1184 CR-413; 34°03′23″N 88°55′28″W	Old Houlka	
10	Thelma Mound Archaeological Site	Thelma Mound Archaeological Site	November 3, 1994 (#94001222)	Address restricted	Houston	

== See also ==
- List of National Historic Landmarks in Mississippi
- National Register of Historic Places listings in Mississippi
