= Vardaman, Mississippi =

- Town
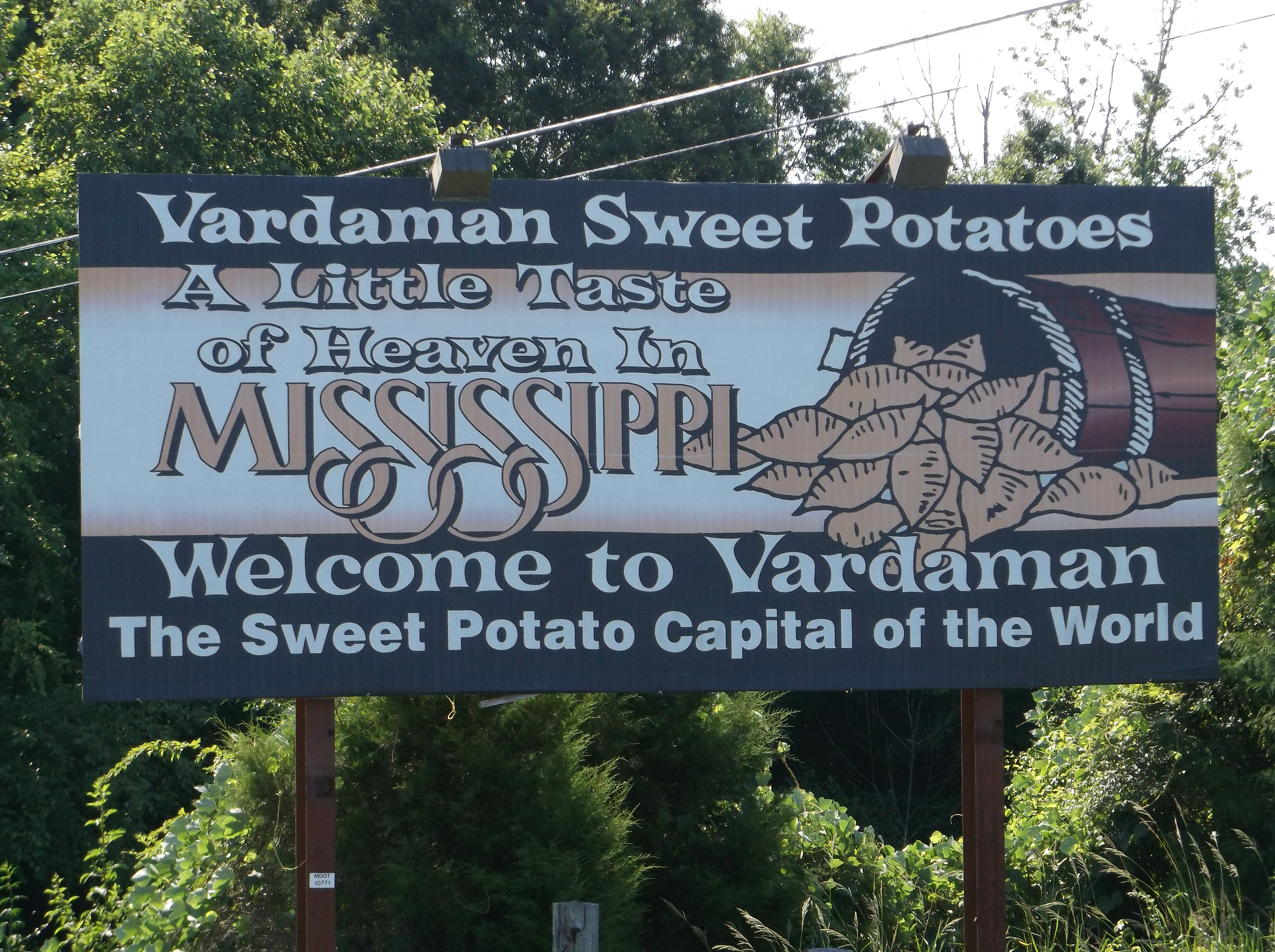
- Sign located along Mississippi Highway 8
- Nickname: The Sweet Potato Capital of the World
- Motto: "A Little Taste of Heaven in Mississippi."
- Location of Vardaman, Mississippi

- Location in the United States
- Coordinates: 33°52′47″N 89°10′37″W
- Country: United States
- State: Mississippi
- County: Calhoun
- Established: 1904

Government
  - Mayor: James M. Casey

Area
  - Total: 1.36 sq mi (3.51 km^{2})
  - Land: 1.36 sq mi (3.51 km^{2})
  - Water: 0 sq mi (0.00 km^{2})
- Elevation: 289 ft (88 m)

Population (2020)
  - Total: 1,110
  - Density: 818/sq mi (315.8/km^{2})
- Time zone: UTC-6 (Central (CST))
  - Summer (DST): UTC-5 (CDT)
- ZIP code: 38878
- Area code: 662
- FIPS code: 28-76320
- GNIS feature ID: 0679189
- Website: www.townofvardaman.com

Vardaman is a town in Calhoun County, Mississippi. As of the 2020 census, Vardaman had a population of 1,110.

== History ==
The town is named after James Kimble Vardaman, Mississippi governor from 1904 to 1908. Vardaman was a Democrat and white supremacist who later became a member of the United States Senate.

In the early days of the town, its post office was named "Timberville" while the town was still known as "Vardaman," leading to confusion in various letterheads. Postmaster Henry Clay Payne refused to name a post office after James K. Vardaman, who had attacked Theodore Roosevelt in newspaper editorials published in the Greenwood Commonwealth.

The town's post office was officially named "Vardaman" in 1912.

By 1906, Southern Railway built a rail branch through Vardaman, connecting it to the Mobile and Ohio Railroad. The line was sold in 1933 to form the Okolona, Houston and Calhoun City Railway, which operated a stop at Vardaman until 1940, when the company was dissolved.

== Geography ==
Vardaman is located in eastern Calhoun County. Mississippi Highway 8 passes through the town, leading west 8 miles (13 km) to Calhoun City and east 10 miles (16 km) to Houston, as well as Mississippi Highway 341, leading north 33 miles (53 km) to Pontotoc and south 11 miles (18 km) to Atlanta and Woodland.

According to the United States Census Bureau, the town has a total area of 1.4 square miles (3.5 km^{2}), all land. The Yalobusha River, a tributary of the Yazoo River, flows past the town less than one mile to the south.

Vardaman is located in one of Mississippi's top five sweet potato-producing counties. The Vardaman Sweet Potato Festival, also known as the National Sweet Potato Festival, is held there annually the entire first week in November. Vardaman has been proclaimed as the "Sweet Potato Capital of the World".

== Demographics ==
Historical population
Census	Pop.	Note	%±
1910	430		—
1920	599		39.3%
1930	627		4.7%
1940	626		−0.2%
1950	686		9.6%
1960	637		−7.1%
1970	777		22.0%
1980	1,009		29.9%
1990	920		−8.8%
2000	1,065		15.8%
2010	1,316		23.6%
2020	1,110		−15.7%
U.S. Decennial Census

=== 2020 census ===
Vardaman Racial Composition
Race	Num.	Perc.
White	437	39.37%
Black or African American	289	26.04%
Asian	1	0.09%
Other/Mixed	20	1.8%
Hispanic or Latino	363	32.7%

As of the 2020 United States census, there were 1,110 people, 440 households, and 318 families residing in the town.

=== 2000 census ===
As of the census of 2000, there were 1,065 people, 426 households, and 276 families residing in the town. The population density was 785.3 inhabitants per square mile (303.2/km^{2}). There were 471 housing units at an average density of 347.3 units per square mile (134.1 units/km^{2}). The racial makeup of the town was 58.69% White, 33.90% African American, 0.19% Native American, 0.09% Pacific Islander, 6.38% from other races, and 0.75% from two or more races. Hispanic or Latino of any race were 9.77% of the population.

There were 426 households, out of which 31.2% had children under the age of 18 living with them, 42.3% were married couples living together, 18.3% had a female householder with no husband present, and 35.0% were non-families. 31.0% of all households were made up of individuals, and 15.5% had someone living alone who was 65 years of age or older. The average household size was 2.50 and the average family size was 3.16.

In the town, the population was spread out, with 26.2% under the age of 18, 10.3% from 18 to 24, 27.0% from 25 to 44, 22.1% from 45 to 64, and 14.4% who were 65 years of age or older. The median age was 34 years. For every 100 females, there were 86.8 males. For every 100 females age 18 and over, there were 84.1 males.

The median income for a household in the town was $21,518, and the median income for a family was $29,205. Males had a median income of $25,000 versus $17,750 for females. The per capita income for the town was $13,530. About 22.0% of families and 24.1% of the population were below the poverty line, including 25.8% of those under age 18 and 27.3% of those age 65 or over.

== Education ==
Vardaman is served by the Calhoun County School District. Children in the Vardaman area attend either Vardaman Elementary School (Grades K-6) or Vardaman High School (Grades 7–12). Vardaman High School's sports teams are known as the Rams.

The Vardaman Rams football program has won 14 division titles in school history and has advanced to the North Half State Finals six times. The Rams also have appeared in the playoffs 29 times, which is tied for the 5th most all-time in the state and 2nd most in the 1A classification.

Odie Armstrong, a running back that broke numerous records in the arena football league, played football at Vardaman. In his high school career, Armstrong rushed for 5,838 yards and 104 touchdowns, including 39 scores in a record-breaking senior season.

The Vardaman Lady Rams basketball team has won two state championships, one in 1959 and another in 1969. The Lady Rams also appeared in the state championship tournament in 2016. The Rams are now coached by Connor Hudspeth or Tupelo, MS.

The Vardaman Lady Rams fastpitch softball team won the program's first championship in the 1A state championship in 2019. The Lady Rams returned to the state championship in 2022, finishing as the 1A state runner-up.

The Vardaman Lady Rams girls' powerlifting team captured their first state championship in program history in 2026.

== Notable people ==
- Odie Armstrong, player in the Arena Football League
- Mary Wilma Hodge, physicist
- Barbara Yancy, politician
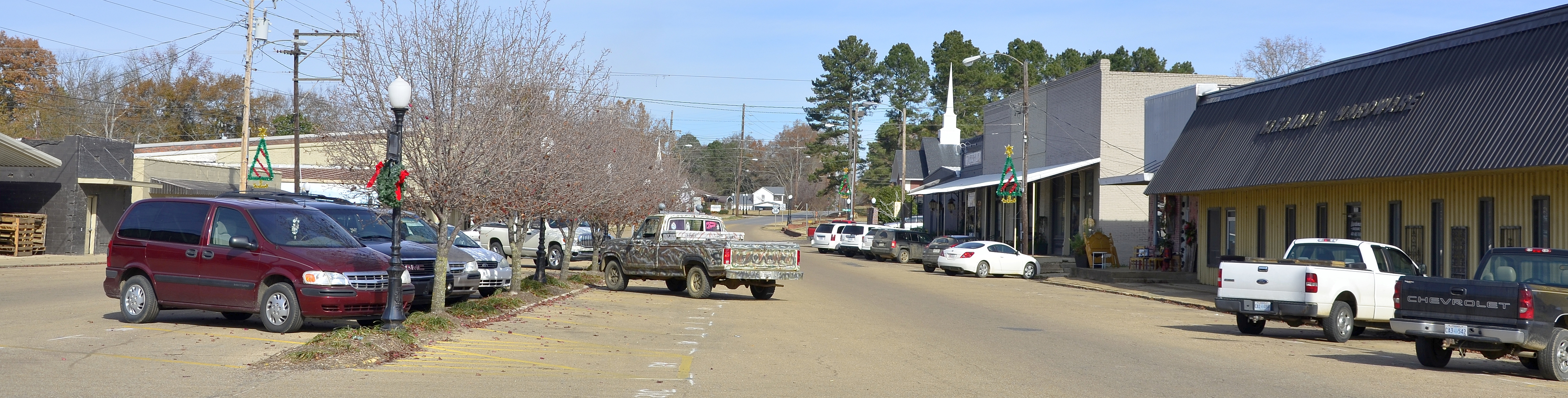
Main Street in Vardaman
