= Tanglefoot Trail =

Asphalt-covered rail trail in northeastern Mississippi, US

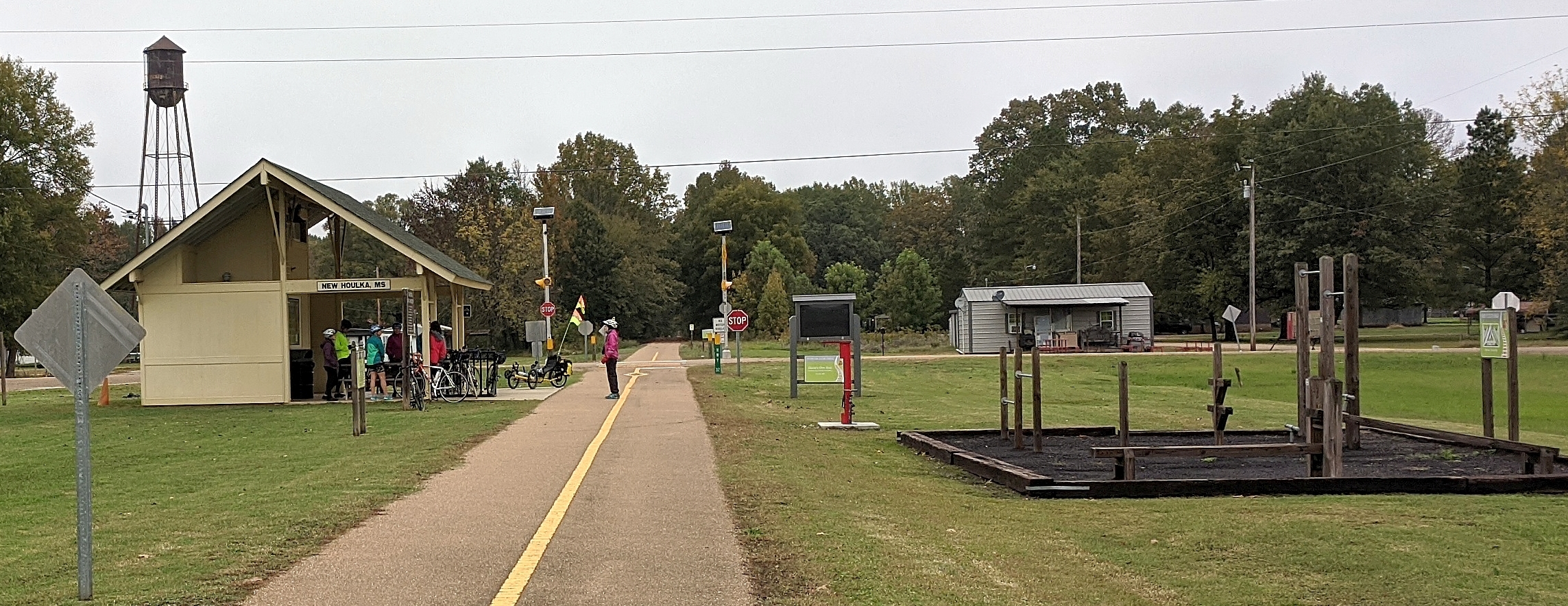
- Trail in New Houlka, Mississippi
- Length: 43.6 miles (70.2 km)
- Completed: September 2013
- Designation: National Recreation Trail
- Trailheads: New Albany, Mississippi; Houston, Mississippi
- Use: Cycling, hiking, roller skating
- Highest point: 441 feet (134 m)
- Lowest point: 319 feet (97 m)
- Grade: 1%
- Difficulty: Easy
- Season: All
- Surface: Asphalt
- Right of way: Ripley and New Albany Railroad
- Maintainer: GM&O Rails-to-Trails Recreational District of North Mississippi
- Website: tanglefoottrail.com

The Tanglefoot Trail is an asphalt-covered rail trail in northeastern Mississippi. Ranging 43.6 miles (70.2 km) in the right-of-way of the Ripley and New Albany Railroad, it is the longest rail-trail in the state. It runs through three counties (Chickasaw, Pontotoc, and Union) and is located within the Mississippi Hills National Heritage Area.

== History ==
A portion (the Pontotoc to New Albany section) of the route's origin goes back to the Chickasaw, who later called it the "King's Highway". The king in question was Ishtehotopah, the last king of the tribe, who, on June 9, 1838, led 129 followers from Pontotoc to Indian Territory. It was also used by explorers such as Hernando de Soto and Meriwether Lewis and was part of the original Natchez Trace. The section then became part of William Clark Falkner's Gulf and Ship Island Railroad (G&SI) in the late 1800s. The name Tanglefoot comes from a train engine. This section was later sold to the Gulf & Chicago Railroad (G&CR) in 1889. In 1903, the Mobile, Jackson & Kansas City Railroad (MJ&KC) started building north from Beaumont, with the end goal that it would connect the town with Jackson, Tennessee. The MJ&KC ended up leasing the G&CR on July 1, 1903. The gap between the two railroads was completed in 1906 and the two companies merged to become the New Orleans, Mobile & Chicago Railroad (NOM&C) in 1909, marking the first time the current trail route fell into the ownership of one company. The NOM&C became the Gulf, Mobile and Northern Railroad (GM&N) following reorganization on January 1, 1917. The route changed ownership yet again in 1940, this time becoming the Gulf, Mobile and Ohio Railroad following a merger with the GM&N and the Mobile and Ohio Railroad. Ownership once again changed hands when the railroad merged into the Illinois Central Railroad on August 10, 1972, thus becoming Illinois Central Gulf Railroad (ICG). ICG abandoned this route and sold it to the Gulf and Mississippi Railroad in 1985. Struggling financially, the rail network was sold to MidSouth Rail in April 1988. Kansas City Southern Railway then acquired MidSouth in 1994. At some point, North American RailNet acquired it for its Mississippi and Tennessee RailNet (now Ripley and New Albany Railroad), which marked the last change of the route's ownership when it was used as a railroad.

In 2003, after deeming it unprofitable, the railroad gave a notice of abandonment for the stretch between New Albany and Houston. Garnering inspiration from Hattiesburg's Longleaf Trace, officials for the communities the rail serviced expressed interest to convert this now-abandoned railway. Prior to funding for the trail, the Mississippi Department of Wildlife, Fisheries, and Parks granted $100,000 for the construction of whistlestops on the trail in March 2007. The E. Rhodes and Leona B. Carpenter Foundation provided an additional $40,000 for the facilities in December 2012. In August 2008, the Mississippi Department of Transportation awarded a $5.1 million grant for the development of the trail. Additional funds of $350,000 to assist with the development were allotted. In July 2008, the right of way was purchased. $4.5 million was granted in August 2010, this time to asphalt the length of the trail. Construction was completed in September 2013, and the trail was open on the 21st of that month. The New Albany trailhead and Pontotoc rest area were completed at a later date. The trail was designated as a National Recreation Trail in 2015. A pavilion just south of New Albany was completed during the summer of 2016. The arch located at the end of the trail in New Albany was completed in mid-November 2017 and the signage on the arch was installed around a year later. On August 23, 2019, the Rails-to-Trails Conservancy inducted the Tanglefoot into the Rail-Trail Hall of Fame, becoming the 33rd member. The trail received around 14,000 votes, more than half of all votes counted.

== Route ==
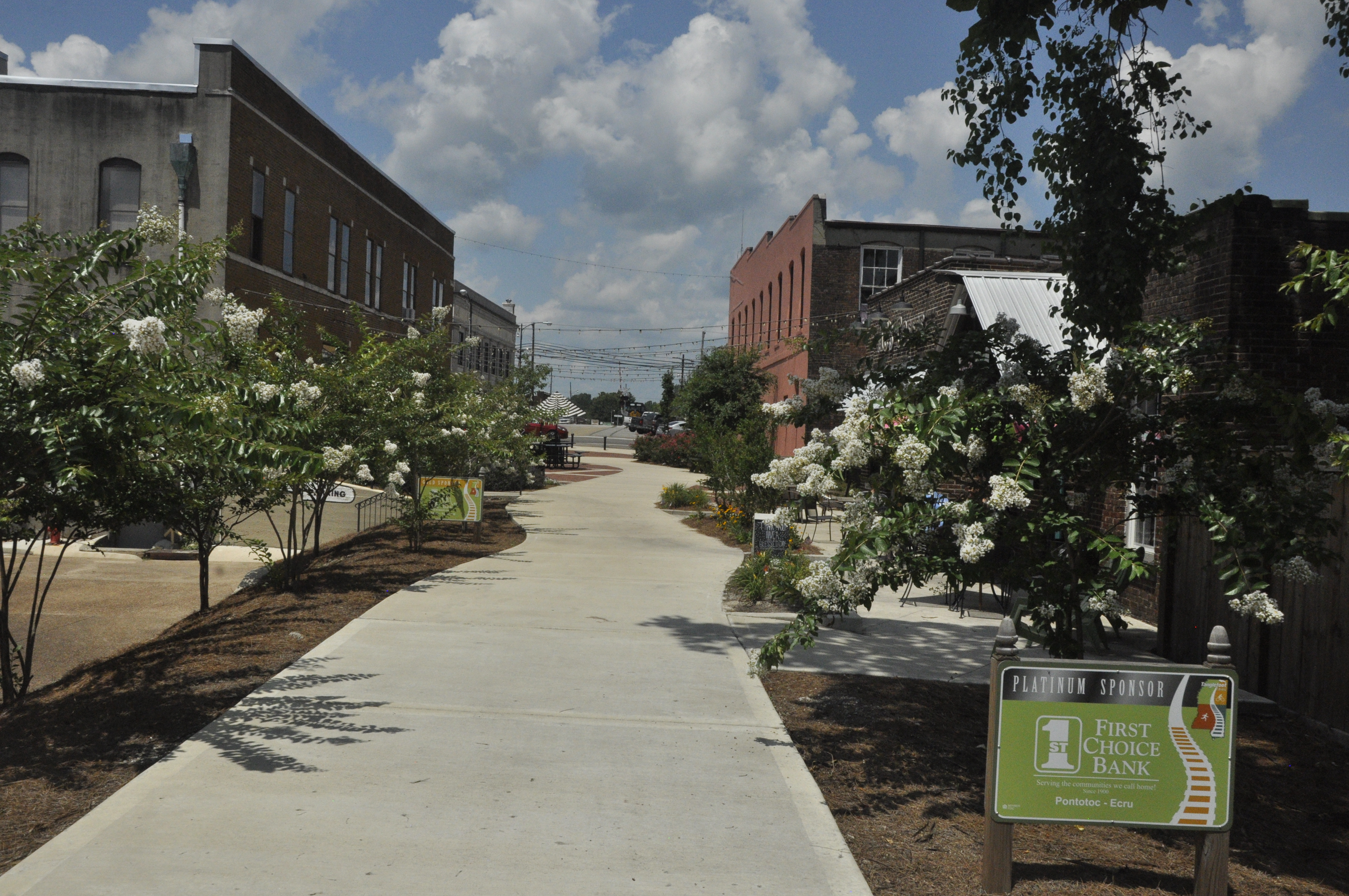
Bankhead Street in New Albany, near the end of the trail. A plaza and signage denote the terminus.

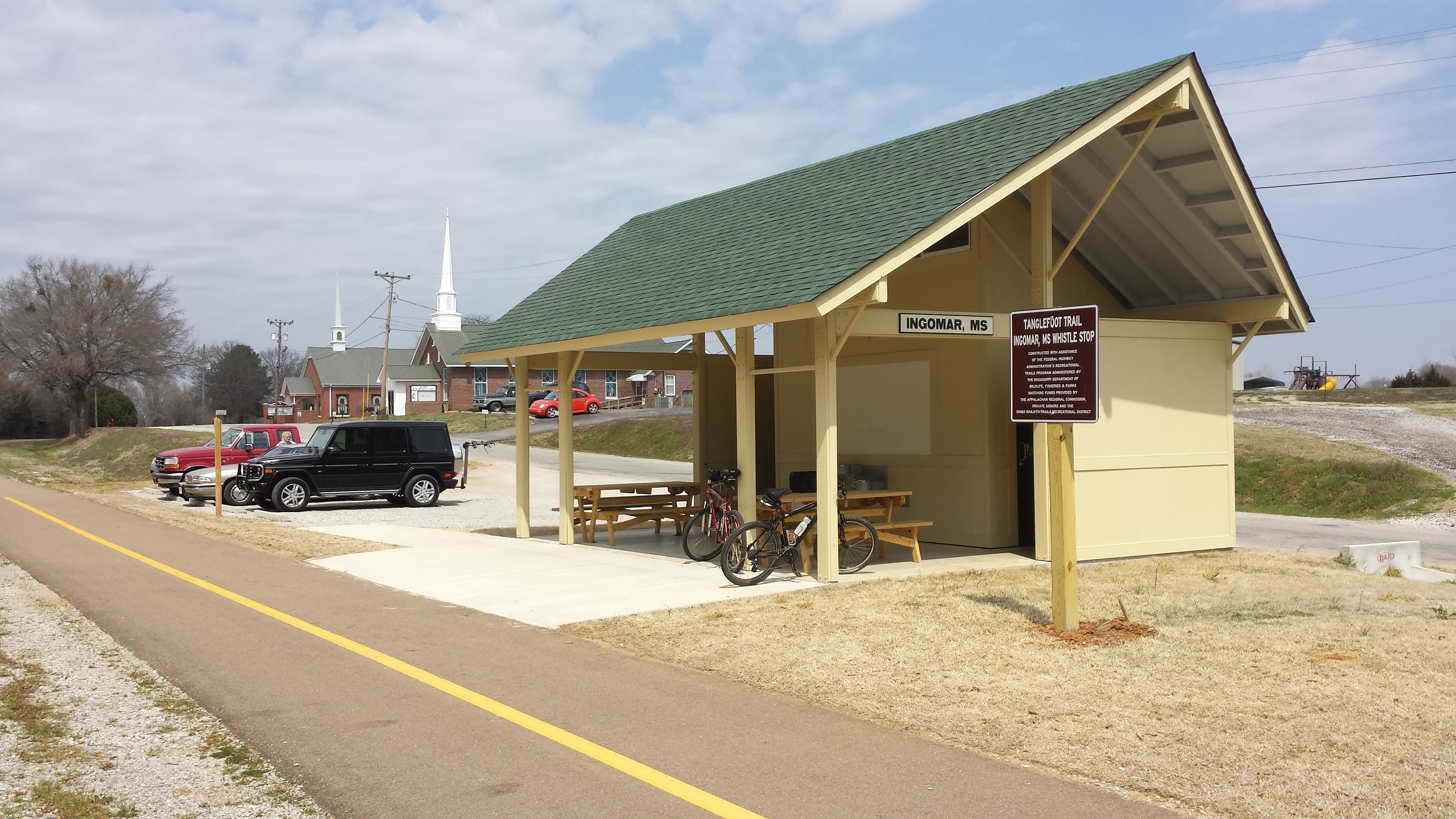
Whistlestop in Ingomar

The trail runs through seven rural communities, usually going through the community's center. Along the trail, sculptures and an arch are made of bicycles. Businesses along the trail also adapt to fit the needs of cyclists. An annual bike race, the Tour de Bodock, is held in autumn on the Tanglefoot. Currently, the Houston trailhead is under construction. The path throughout the trail is ten feet wide. The four whistlestops on the trail, located in New Houlka, Algoma, Ecru, and Ingomar, have bathroom facilities. Public parking is located on the whistlestops as well as the New Albany and Houston trailheads and Pontotoc gateway. The trail winds through woodlands, open area and ponds. Wildlife such as deer, rabbits, and squirrels are common throughout the trail, and even loose goats and sheep from nearby farms can be spotted.

Community	Mile marker	Facility coordinates
Houston	0	33.894932°N 89.006918°W
New Houlka	9.9	34.173678°N 89.030791°W
Algoma	19.3	34.173678°N 89.030791°W
Pontotoc	25.8	34.247789°N 89.003230°W
Ecru	32.6	34.346864°N 89.024441°W
Ingomar	37.1	34.409625°N 89.038938°W
New Albany	43.6	34.493804°N 89.008424°W
