= Hollis, Mississippi =

- Unincorporated community
- Location within Mississippi Location within the United States
- Coordinates: 33°51′48″N 89°14′30″W
- Country: United States
- State: Mississippi
- County: Calhoun
- Elevation: 318 ft (97 m)
- Time zone: UTC-6 (Central (CST))
  - Summer (DST): UTC-5 (CDT)
- Area code: 662
- GNIS feature ID: 683377

Hollis is an unincorporated community in Calhoun County, Mississippi, United States.

== History ==
Hollis was formerly home to a school prior to it being relocated to the New Liberty community.

A post office operated under the name Hollis from 1890 to 1921.

In September 1906, Southern Railway built a branch line operated by the Mobile and Ohio Railroad through Hollis. The line was sold to create the Okolona, Houston and Calhoun City Railway, which listed Hollis as a station in 1937.
