= Mississippi Tennessee Railroad =

Mississippi Tennessee Railroad or Mississippi & Tennessee Railroad may refer to:

- Ripley and New Albany Railroad, from New Albany to Falkner, Mississippi, and previously extended from Houston, Mississippi, to Middleton, Tennessee
- Mississippi and Tennessee Railroad, connecting Memphis, Tennessee with Grenada, Mississippi
