= Chickasaw County Courthouse =

Chickasaw County Courthouse mar refer to:

- Chickasaw County Courthouse (Iowa), listed on the National Register of Historic Places listings in Iowa
- Chickasaw County Courthouse (Mississippi), a Mississippi Landmarks
