= Merchants Bank Building =

Merchants Bank Building may refer to:

- Merchants Bank Building (Daytona Beach, Florida), also known as the Halifax Historical Museum, listed on the National Register of Historic Places (NRHP)
- Merchants Bank Building (Providence, Rhode Island), NRHP-listed
- Merchant Bank Building (Kharkiv), historical building in Kharkiv, Ukraine

== See also ==
- Merchants and Farmers Bank Building, Okolona, Mississippi, NRHP-listed
- Merchants and Planters Bank (Clarendon, Arkansas), NRHP-listed
