= Mooneyham =

Mooneyham is a surname. Notable people with the surname include:

- Bill Mooneyham (born 1960), American baseball player
- Walter Stanley Mooneyham (1926–1991), American magazine editor

Fictional characters:

- Zack Mooneyham, character in the film School of Rock
