= William R. Dunlap =

William (Bill) Dunlap
- Born: January 21, 1944; Webster County, Mississippi, U.S.
- Education: University of Mississippi

William (Bill) R. Dunlap is an American artist, writer, and arts commentator on Washington, DC's flagship PBS station, WETA-TV. With a career that has spanned more than four decades, his large scale narrative paintings and constructions concern themselves with history, allegory and the art making process. "Hypothetical Realism" is a term Dunlap coined to describe his work in both the visual arts and fiction - "the places and things I paint and describe are not real, but they could be." Dunlap is an avid and accomplished printmaker as well as painter, sculptor and photographer. His work is included in collections such as the New York's Metropolitan Museum of Art, The National Gallery of Art in Washington, DC, Mississippi Museum of Art, Turchin Center for the Visual Arts, Lauren Rogers Museum of Art, Ogden Museum of Southern Art, Riggs Bank, IBM Corporation, Federal Express, The Equitable Collection, Arkansas Art Center, the United States State Department, and United States Embassies throughout the world. Dunlap is also the author of Short Mean Fiction (ISBN 9781936946709), published April 1, 2016 by Nautilus Press, a collection of 15 stories with excerpts from sketchbooks which read "like tales from the Old Testament rampant with sex violence and death."

== Life ==
William Dunlap was born in Houston, Mississippi on January 21, 1944. He has a degree from the University of Mississippi, and taught at Appalachian State University in North Carolina from 1970 to 1979 and Memphis State University from 1979 to 1980. He has lectured on art related subjects at colleges, universities, institutions and professional conferences. He serves as arts commentator on WETA-TV's cultural round table show, "Around Town." He currently maintains studios in McLean, Virginia, Mathiston, Mississippi and Coral Gables, Florida.

== Art ==
Dunlap classifies his artistic style as hypothetical realism. He has co-curated several exhibitions at the Meridian International Center in Washington, D.C. including A Winding River: Contemporary Painting from Vietnam and Outward Bound: American Art on the Brink of the 21st Century. Currently, he is working on a third exhibition to open at the Meridian International Center that focuses on contemporary Cuban paintings. He painted the official portrait of Mississippi Governor Ray Mabus.

== Solo exhibitions ==
- Corcoran Gallery of Art
- National Academy of Science
- Aspen Museum of Art
- Southeastern Center for Contemporary Art
- Museum of Western Virginia
- Albany Museum of Art
- Cheekwood Fine Arts Center
- Mint Museum of Art
- Mississippi Museum of Art
- Contemporary Arts Center-New Orleans, LA

== Current representation ==
- Art Cellar Gallery, Banner Elk, NC
- Southside Gallery, Oxford, MS
- Soren Christensen Gallery, New Orleans, LA
- Catherine Kelleghan Gallery
- Greg Thompson Fine Art, North Little Rock, Arkansas

== Awards and fellowships ==
- Rockefeller Foundation
- Lila Wallace Foundation for study and travel in Southeast Asia
- Warhol Foundation, Virginia Commission for the Arts
- Mississippi Institute of Arts and Letters
- Southeastern Center for Contemporary Art/RJR Nabisco Visual Artists Award
- The Mississippi Governor's Award for Excellence in the Arts.

Panorama of the American Landscape, his fourteen panel, 112 feet long cyclorama painting depicting a contemporary view of the Shenandoah Valley in summer and the Antietam battlefield in winter, was commissioned for the Rotunda Gallery at the Corcoran Gallery of Art in 1985, but since its debut has been shown in nearly a dozen American museums and art centers, its most recent venue being the Chrysler Museum in Norfolk, VA. In addition, Reconstructed Recollections and In the Spirit of the Land are also exhibitions of Mr. Dunlap's work that continue major tours.

A Winding River: Contemporary Painting from Vietnam, an exhibition he co-curated, opened at the Meridian International Center in Washington, DC during the 1997–98 season and traveled to several American museums. He also co-curated a counterpoint to that project: Outward Bound: American Art on the Brink of the 21st Century which opened at the Meridian International Center as well and is traveling throughout Southeast Asia. Currently, he is working on another exhibition to open at the Meridian International Center, that of contemporary Cuban painting.
