= Ellard, Mississippi =

- Unincorporated community
- Location within Mississippi Location within the United States
- Coordinates: 34°00′57″N 89°24′53″W
- Country: United States
- State: Mississippi
- County: Calhoun
- Elevation: 279 ft (85 m)
- Time zone: UTC-6 (Central (CST))
  - Summer (DST): UTC-5 (CDT)
- Area code: 662
- GNIS feature ID: 669728

Ellard is an unincorporated community in Calhoun County, Mississippi, United States.

== History ==
Ellard was formerly home to Ellard High School.

A post office operated under the name Ellard from 1895 to 1908.
