= Houston School District =

American School District

Houston School District was a school district in Mississippi. In addition to Houston, the district served the village of Woodland.

It merged with the Chickasaw County School District. The two existing districts dissolved on June 30, 2021 and a new district named "Chickasaw County School District" formed on July 1, 2021.

== Schools ==
- Houston High School (Grades 9-12)
- Houston Middle School (Grades 6-8)
- Houston Upper Elementary School (Grades 3-5)
- Houston Lower Elementary School (Grades K-2)

== Demographics ==
=== 2006-07 school year ===
There were a total of 1,984 students enrolled in the Houston School District during the 2006–2007 school year. The gender makeup of the district was 48% female and 52% male. The racial makeup of the district was 41.18% African American, 52.02% White, 6.25% Hispanic, 0.45% Asian, and 0.10% Native American. 55.1% of the district's students were eligible to receive free lunch.

=== Previous school years ===
| School Year | Enrollment | Gender Makeup | | Racial Makeup | | | | |
| School Year | Enrollment | Female | Male | Asian | African American | Hispanic | Native American | White |
|---|---|---|---|---|---|---|---|---|
| 2005-06 | 1,941 | 49% | 51% | 0.52% | 41.11% | 6.18% | 0.10% | 52.09% |
| 2004-05 | 1,960 | 49% | 51% | 0.51% | 43.67% | 5.00% | 0.36% | 50.46% |
| 2003-04 | 1,974 | 50% | 50% | 0.61% | 45.90% | 4.10% | 0.10% | 49.29% |
| 2002-03 | 2,054 | 50% | 50% | 0.68% | 47.47% | 3.65% | 0.19% | 48.00% |

== Accountability statistics ==
| | 2006-07 | 2005-06 | 2004-05 | 2003-04 | 2002-03 |
|---|---|---|---|---|---|
| District Accreditation Status | Accredited | Accredited | Advised | Accredited | Accredited |
School Performance Classifications
| Level 5 (Superior Performing) Schools | 1 | 1 | 1 | 1 | 1 |
| Level 4 (Exemplary) Schools | 1 | 0 | 2 | 2 | 1 |
| Level 3 (Successful) Schools | 1 | 2 | 0 | 0 | 1 |
| Level 2 (Under Performing) Schools | 0 | 0 | 0 | 0 | 0 |
| Level 1 (Low Performing) Schools | 0 | 0 | 0 | 0 | 0 |
| Not Assigned | 1 | 1 | 1 | 1 | 1 |

== See also ==
- List of school districts in Mississippi
