= Dentontown, Mississippi =

- Unincorporated community
- Location within Mississippi Location within the United States
- Coordinates: 33°44′27″N 89°26′34″W
- Country: United States
- State: Mississippi
- County: Calhoun
- Elevation: 279 ft (85 m)
- Time zone: UTC-6 (Central (CST))
  - Summer (DST): UTC-5 (CDT)
- Area code: 662
- GNIS feature ID: 669233

Dentontown is an unincorporated community in Calhoun County, Mississippi, United States.

A post office operated under the name Denton from 1900 to 1904.
