= Houston Carnegie Library =

- U.S. National Register of Historic Places
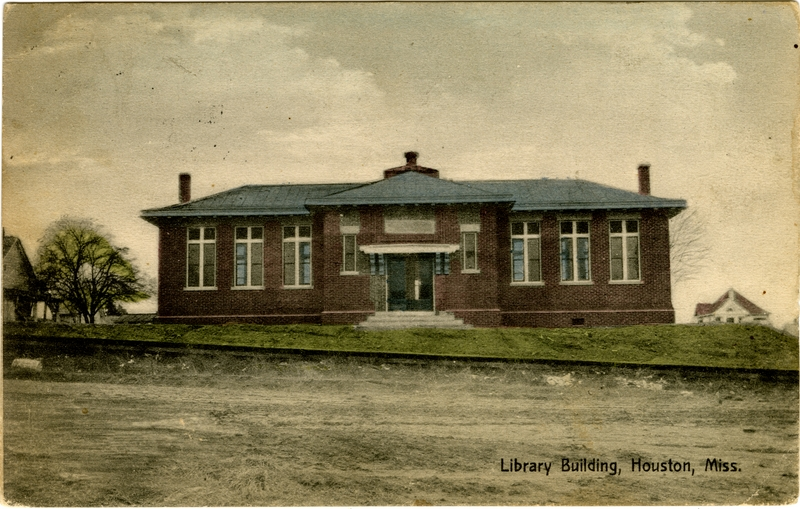
- Historic postcard

- Location within Mississippi Location within the United States
- Location: Madison and Huddleston Sts., Houston, Mississippi
- Coordinates: 33°53′47″N 89°0′3″W
- Area: 0.5 acres (0.20 ha)
- Built: 1909
- Architectural style: Prairie School, Stick/Eastlake, Western Stick
- NRHP reference No.: 78001593
- Added to NRHP: December 22, 1978

The Houston Carnegie Library, at Madison and Huddleston Sts. in Houston, Mississippi, is a Carnegie library that was built in 1909. It was the first Carnegie library built in Mississippi and was just the second public library in the state. It was listed on the National Register of Historic Places in 1978.
