= MidSouth Rail Corporation =

American railroad line

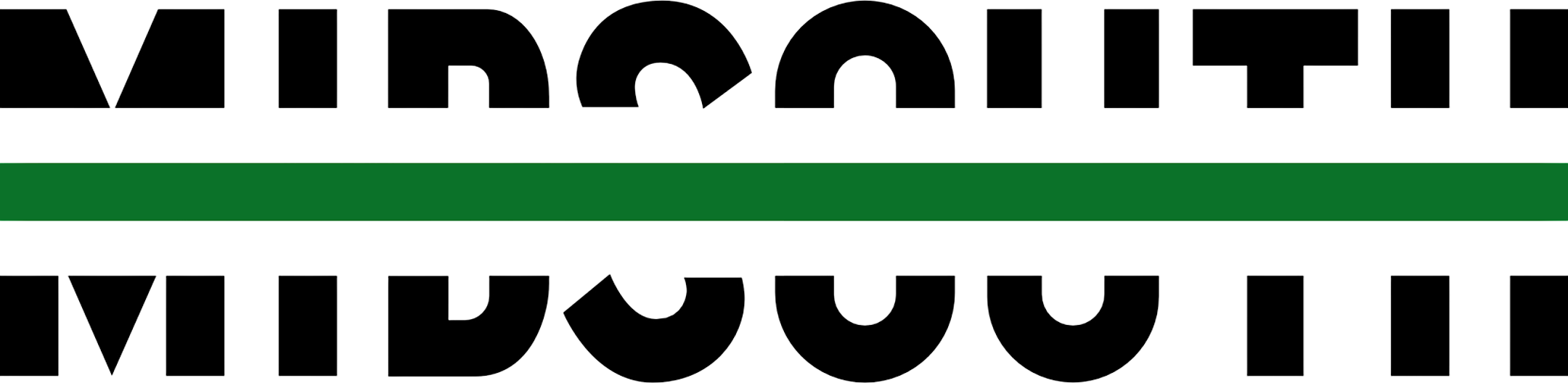

Overview
- Headquarters: Jackson, Mississippi
- Reporting mark: MSRC
- Locale: Mississippi
- Dates of operation: 1986–1993

Technical
- Track gauge: 4 ft 8 1/2 in (1,435 mm) standard gauge

The MidSouth Rail Corporation (reporting mark MSRC) is a railroad line operated by Kansas City Southern Railway (KCS) as a result of the January 1, 1994, acquisition; KCS began operating over MidSouth's line on January 11, 1994. The line ran from Shreveport, Louisiana, going east across Louisiana, and across the state of Mississippi, running through the cities of Vicksburg, Jackson, Meridian, and Artesia, Mississippi, then across the Alabama state line to Tuscaloosa, and finally (via Norfolk Southern Railway trackage rights) into Birmingham. Midsouth had two other branches, with one to Counce, Tennessee, and a disconnected line from Gulfport to Hattiesburg, Mississippi. Total mileage was 1,212 miles (1,951 km) worth of mostly former Illinois Central Gulf's east-west Shreveport - Meridian main line.

== Operations ==
On March 31, 1986, MidSouth Rail Corp. was created to purchase 373 miles (600 km) of Illinois Central Gulf Railroad (ICG), with start up operations on April 1, 1986. Edward L. Moyers served as the railroad's first president. MSRC was mostly the ex-ICG route between Meridian, Mississippi, and Shreveport, Louisiana, with the earliest segment of this line being built in 1833 by the Clinton and Vicksburg Railroad. On September 8, 1987, MSRC acquired the North Louisiana and Gulf Railroad and its subsidiary, Central Louisiana and Gulf Railroad, These properties were combined as subsidiary MidLouisiana Rail Corporation.

On April 14, 1988, MidSouth merged with the Gulf and Mississippi Railroad, itself an ICG spinoff. MSRC operated this property under the name of SouthRail.

== Kansas City Southern takeover ==
On January 11, 1994, Kansas City Southern Railway took over operations of all of Midsouth Rail Corp.'s lines, creating its Meridian Corridor to connect with the Norfolk Southern Railway. On December 2, 2005, KCS and NS announced their agreement to form a joint venture to operate the line. KCS contributed the rail line, while NS provided $300 million in cash, almost all of which was slated for capital improvements to increase capacity and improve transit times. The Surface Transportation Board (STB) completed its regulatory review on April 10, 2006, and cleared KCS and NS to close the deal on May 1. The line is now known as the Meridan Speedway.
