= Loyd, Mississippi =

- Unincorporated community
- Location within Mississippi Location within the United States
- Coordinates: 33°57′29″N 89°13′19″W
- Country: United States
- State: Mississippi
- County: Calhoun
- Elevation: 400 ft (120 m)
- Time zone: UTC-6 (Central (CST))
  - Summer (DST): UTC-5 (CDT)
- Area code: 662
- GNIS feature ID: 672937

Loyd is an unincorporated community in Calhoun County, Mississippi, United States. A post office operated under the name Loyd from 1884 to 1909.
