= Chickasaw County School District =

School district in Mississippi, United States

Address
- 636 Starkville Road Houston, Mississippi, 38851; United States

District information
- Type: Public
- Grades: PreK–12
- NCES District ID: 2800200

Students and staff
- Students: 479
- Teachers: 35.17
- Staff: 26.25
- Student–teacher ratio: 13.62

Other information
- Website: chickasaw.k12.ms.us

The Chickasaw County School District is a public school district based in Houston, Mississippi (USA).

On June 30, 2021, the Houston School District and the former Chickasaw County School District were dissolved, with a new Chickasaw County School District formed on July 1, 2021. The former school boards were dissolved and a new consolidated board was formed. The districts were consolidated due to a change in Mississippi law that required the consolidation.

The former Chickasaw County district was headquartered in Houlka.

== Schools ==
Chickasaw County School District operates six schools:

- Houston Lower Elementary (Grades K-2)
- Houston Upper Elementary (Grade 3-5)
- Houston Middle School (Grades 6-8)
- Houston High School (Grades 9-12)
- Houston Career and Technical Education Center (Vocational Grades 10-12, AEST Grades 9-12)
- Houlka Attendance Center (the only school of the pre-merger district)
  - Elementary School (Grades K-6)
  - High School (Grades 7-12)

== Demographics ==
=== 2006-07 school year ===
A total of around 526 students were enrolled in the pre-merger Chickasaw County School District during the 2006–2007 school year. The gender makeup of the district was 46% female and 54% male. The racial makeup of the district was 46.20% African American, 49.81% White, and 3.99% Hispanic. 62.1% of the district's students were eligible to receive free lunch.

=== Previous school years ===
School Year	Enrollment	Gender Makeup		Racial Makeup				
School Year	Enrollment	Female	Male	Asian	African American	Hispanic	Native American	White
2005-06	525	46%	54%	–	46.48%	3.05%	–	50.48%
2004-05	528	46%	54%	–	49.43%	1.14%	–	49.43%
2003-04	530	47%	53%	–	50.19%	1.32%	–	48.49%
2002-03	533	46%	54%	–	48.97%	1.50%	–	49.53%

== Accountability statistics ==
	2006-07	2005-06	2004-05	2003-04	2002-03
District Accreditation Status	Accredited	Accredited	Accredited	Accredited	Accredited
School Performance Classifications
Level 5 (Superior Performing) Schools	0	0	0	0	0
Level 4 (Exemplary) Schools	0	0	0	0	0
Level 3 (Successful) Schools	1	1	1	1	1
Level 2 (Under Performing) Schools	0	0	0	0	0
Level 1 (Low Performing) Schools	0	0	0	0	0
Not Assigned	0	0	0	0	0

== See also ==
- List of school districts in Mississippi
- Mississippi School for Mathematics and Science
- Mississippi School of the Arts
