= Old Town, Calhoun County, Mississippi =

Coordinates: 33.98810°N 89.29906°W

Old Town, Mississippi
- Ghost town
- Location of Old Town, Mississippi
- Country: United States
- State: Mississippi
- County: Calhoun
- Elevation: 266 ft (81 m)
- Time zone: UTC-6 (Central (CST))
  - Summer (DST): UTC-5 (CDT)
- GNIS feature ID: 683376

Old Town-originally 'Hartford is in Calhoun County, Mississippi, United States.

Old Town is located along the Skuna River, and was the first county seat of Calhoun County.

== History ==
Chocchuma and Chickasaw Indians first occupied the territory and had a village at Old Town. After the Indian removals in the 1830s, white settlers arrived and the village grew.

A letter from Chickasaw County legislator J.A. Orr described the "aspiring little city" as the "head of navigation on the Loosa Scoona river from which many keel boat bore hundreds of bales of cotton to New Orleans."

Some of the first settlers were the Enochs, Murphrees, Swoffords, Reagans, and Maxeys.

The Enochs owned a boat company, and keel boats and flat boats carried cotton from Old Town down the Skuna River to Greenwood and as far as New Orleans. There was a post office, a store, and a pottery which made plates, bowls, and churns. The first church was at "The Old Burnt Meetin’ House Place"; it burned down in 1845. Old Town also had a camp ground and a Methodist church.

Calhoun County was organized in 1852, and the first courts and meetings of the Board were held at Old Town. That same year, the first meeting of the Board of Supervisors was held in the Methodist Church, and it was decided to move the county seat to Pittsboro.

The Old Town Church and Old Town Cemetery remain; there are homes and farms along nearby roads.

A post office operated under the name Hartford from 1852 to 1854 and under the name Oldtown from 1896 to 1912.
