= Chickasaw County Courthouse (Mississippi) =

Historic building in Houston, US

Coordinates: 33°53′50″N 88°59′59″W

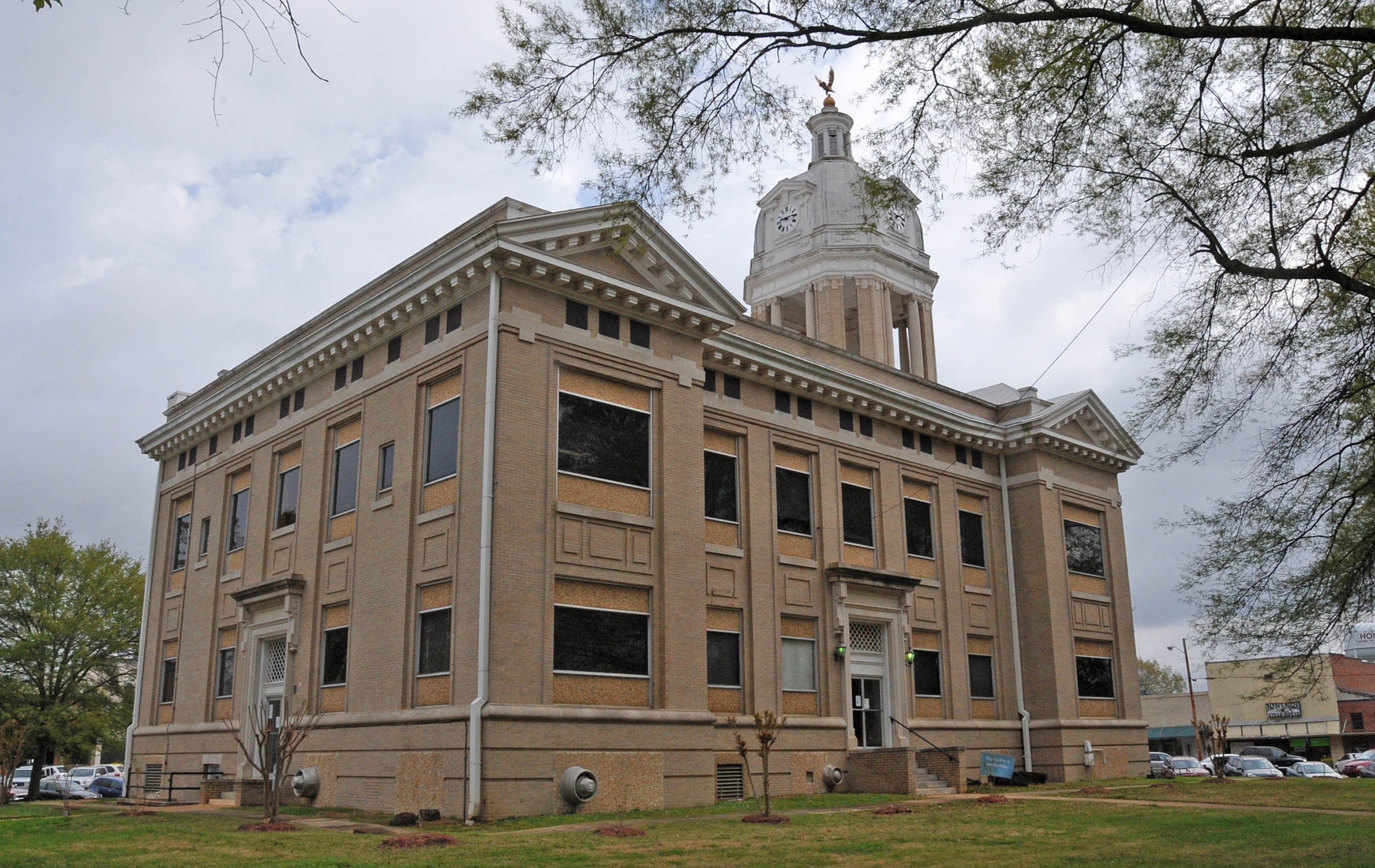

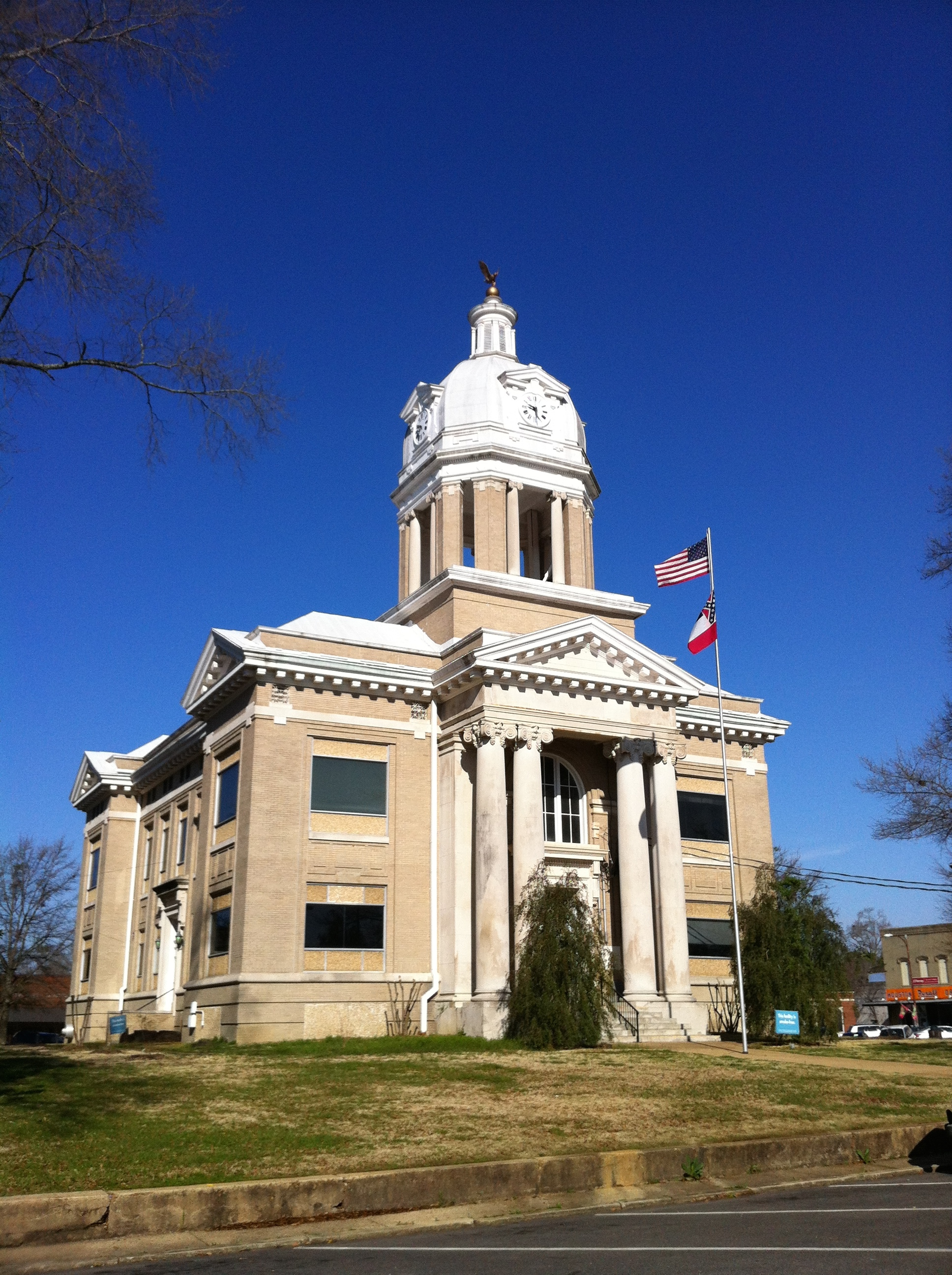

Chickasaw County Courthouse is a historic county courthouse in Houston, Mississippi, one of two county seats of Chickasaw County, Mississippi. It is a Mississippi Landmark. There is also a Chickasaw County Courthouse in Okolona, Mississippi.

It was built in 1909–1910 and is the county's third courthouse building. Ruben Harrison Hunt was the architect. It was owned by the Masonic Lodge. It is a contributing property to the Houston Historic District.

== See also ==
- National Register of Historic Places listings in Chickasaw County, Mississippi
