= Bently, Mississippi =

- Unincorporated community
- Location within Mississippi Location within the United States
- Coordinates: 33°45′27″N 89°13′57″W
- Country: United States
- State: Mississippi
- County: Calhoun
- Elevation: 338 ft (103 m)
- Time zone: UTC-6 (Central (CST))
  - Summer (DST): UTC-5 (CDT)
- Area code: 662
- GNIS feature ID: 705954

Bently, also spelled Bentley, is an unincorporated community in Calhoun County, Mississippi, United States.

== History ==
Bently was first settled in 1844 and named for the Bentley family. It was formerly home to a general store and school. A sawmill was moved from Arbor Grove in Chickasaw County, Mississippi to Bently.

A post office operated under the name Bently from 1877 to 1909.
