= Atlanta, Mississippi =

- Unincorporated community
- Location within Mississippi Location within the United States
- Coordinates: 33°47′54″N 89°08′51″W
- Country: United States
- State: Mississippi
- County: Chickasaw
- Elevation: 407 ft (124 m)
- Time zone: UTC-6 (Central (CST))
  - Summer (DST): UTC-5 (CDT)
- ZIP code: 39776
- Area code: 662
- GNIS feature ID: 666419

Atlanta is an unincorporated community located in Chickasaw County, Mississippi, United States. Atlanta is approximately 5.6 miles (9.0 km) south-southeast of Vardaman and 5.6 miles (9.0 km) north-northwest of Woodland on Mississippi Highway 341.

Atlanta has a zip code of 39776. A post office operated under the name Atlanta from 1874 to 1908.
