= Gulf and Mississippi Railroad =

Railroad in America, created in 1985

Overview
- Headquarters: Columbus, Mississippi
- Reporting mark: GMSR
- Locale: Mississippi
- Dates of operation: 1985–1988
- Predecessor: Illinois Central Gulf
- Successor: MidSouth

Technical
- Track gauge: 4 ft 8 1/2 in (1,435 mm) (standard gauge)
- Length: 713 miles (1,147 km)

The Gulf and Mississippi Railroad (reporting mark GMSR) was the first regional railroad in the United States upon its creation in 1985. With over 713 miles (1,147 km) of track in the states of Mississippi, Tennessee, and Alabama it was among the largest spin-off railroads in the post-Staggers Act era. MidSouth Rail acquired the entire G&M railroad in 1988, operating it as a separate entity, SouthRail. Kansas City Southern purchased MidSouth Rail in 1994 and most of the former G&M lines are still in service under CPKC ex-KCS.

== History ==
Nearly all components of the Gulf & Mississippi were previously owned by the Gulf, Mobile, & Ohio before the 1972 acquisition of that railroad by the Illinois Central. The GM&O previously maintained two parallel routes through eastern Mississippi, and the easternmost route from Corinth, Mississippi, to Mobile, Alabama, 331 miles (533 km), formed the backbone of the G&M system. This route, as well as the Artesia, Mississippi through Tuscaloosa to Holt, Alabama line belonged to the Mobile & Ohio prior to merger with the GM&N in 1940.

In addition to the Corinth–Mobile route, the G&M owned a route from Middleton, Tennessee, to Woodland, Mississippi, including a branch to Tupelo, Mississippi, through trackage rights with Burlington Northern. This allowed access between the main G&M system and the disconnected line from Middleton to Woodland. Initially the disconnected branch was reached through Corinth and Middleton via trackage rights with the Southern. Further lines included Aberdeen to Laurel, Mississippi, and Union to Walnut Grove, Mississippi.

Tracks between Ackerman and Laurel, Middleton and Woodland, as well as the branch from Union to Walnut Grove belonged to the Gulf, Mobile, & Northern prior to 1940. The Aberdeen to Ackerman route was an Illinois Central line and the only Gulf & Mississippi route without Mobile & Ohio or Gulf, Mobile, & Northern heritage.

The Gulf & Mississippi purchased the lines and began service on July 10, 1985. A number of commodities including lumber, wood products, chemicals, and grain were hauled over the railroad, generated around 75,000 annual carloads. However, the railroad was short lived, and on April 14, 1988, the company was sold to MidSouth subsidiary SouthRail.

Kansas City Southern purchased MidSouth in 1994, and SouthRail holdings were merged into KCS operations along with MidSouth. Most of the former Gulf & Mississippi network survives under CPKC, ex KCS, although some segments have been abandoned and others sold to other shortline operations such as the Meridian Southern or Mississippi Tennessee.
