= Ingomar, Mississippi =

- Unincorporated community
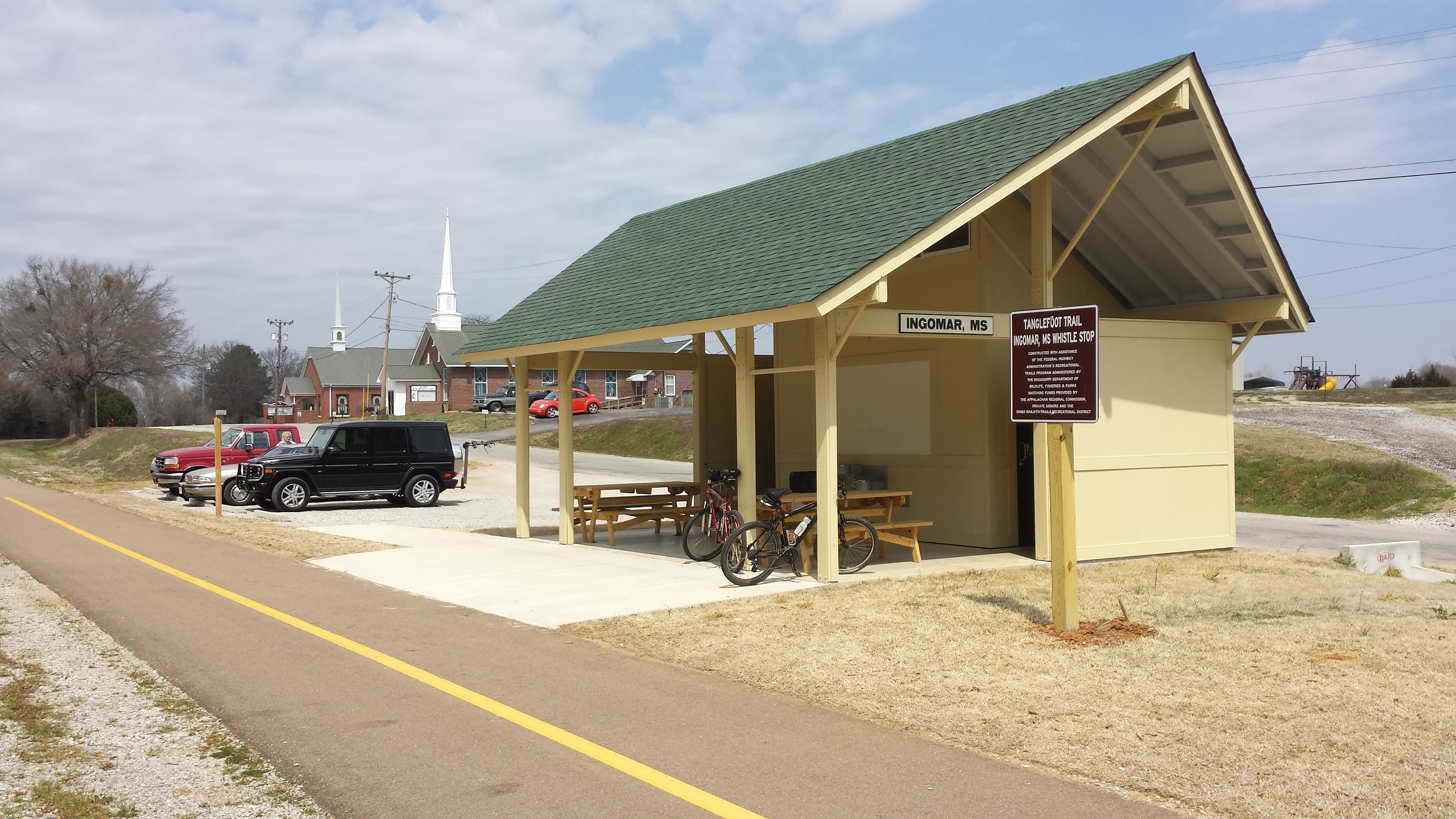
- Tanglefoot Trail whistle stop in Ingomar

- Location within Mississippi Location within the United States
- Coordinates: 34°24′33″N 89°02′12″W
- Country: United States
- State: Mississippi
- County: Union
- Elevation: 358 ft (109 m)
- Time zone: UTC-6 (Central (CST))
  - Summer (DST): UTC-5 (CDT)
- Postal code: 38652
- Area code: 662
- GNIS feature ID: 671708

Ingomar is an unincorporated community located near Mississippi Highway 15 in Union County, Mississippi.

Ingomar is approximately 6 miles (9.7 km) north of Ecru and approximately 7 miles (11 km) south of New Albany.
