= Skuna, Mississippi =

- Unincorporated community
- Location within Mississippi Location within the United States
- Coordinates: 33°57′29″N 89°27′19″W
- Country: United States
- State: Mississippi
- County: Calhoun
- Elevation: 239 ft (73 m)
- Time zone: UTC-6 (Central (CST))
  - Summer (DST): UTC-5 (CDT)
- Area code: 662
- GNIS feature ID: 692233

Skuna is an unincorporated community in Calhoun County, Mississippi, United States.

== History ==
The community takes its name from the Skuna River.
