= Judge Bates House =

Historic house in Mississippi, United States

- U.S. National Register of Historic Places
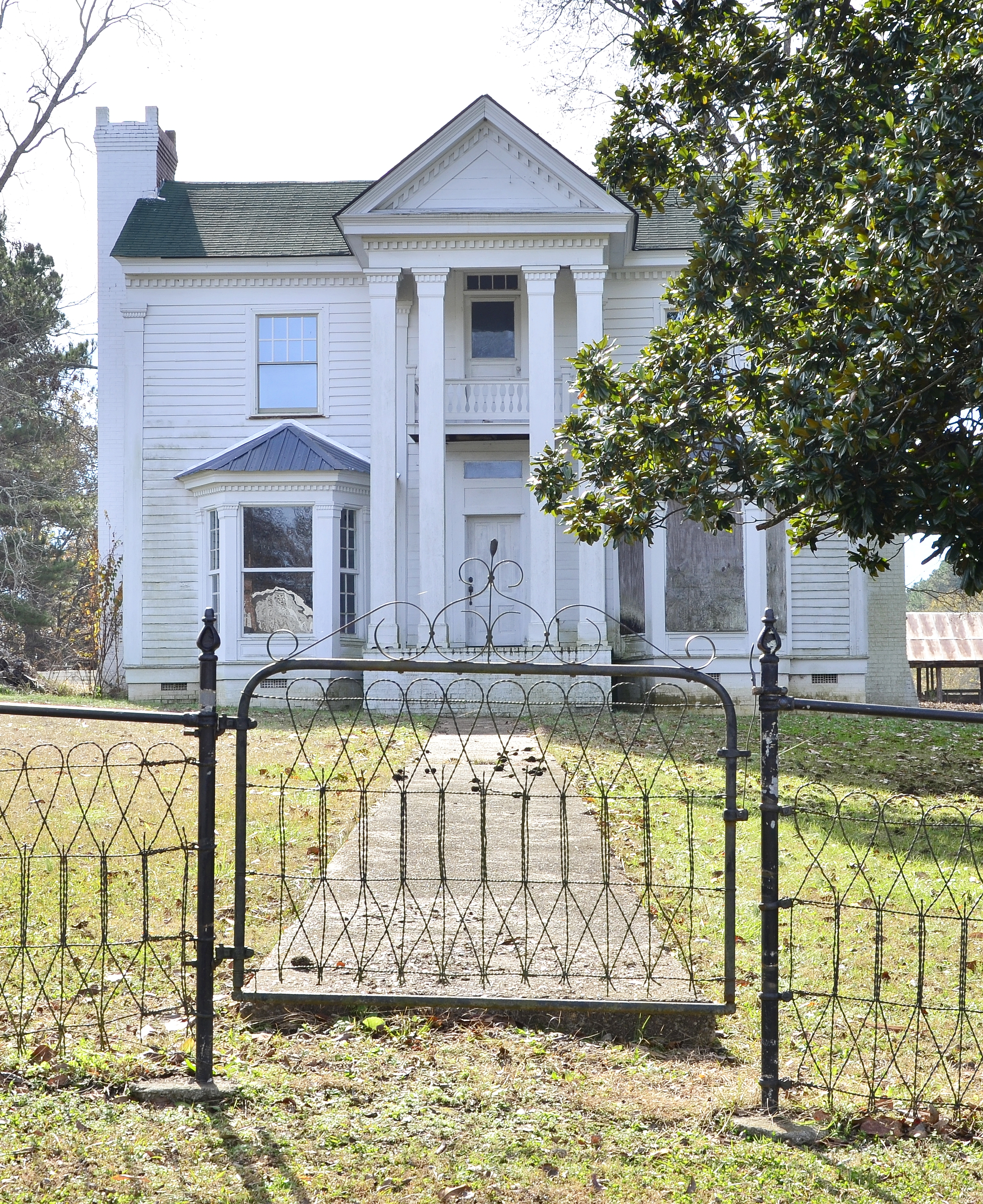
- Judge Bates House in 2014

- Location within Mississippi
- Location: S. Monroe St., Houston, Mississippi
- Coordinates: 33°53′38.8″N 88°59′52.29″W
- Area: 2.5 acres (1.0 ha)
- Built: 1847
- Architectural style: Greek Revival
- NRHP reference No.: 82003097
- Added to NRHP: May 6, 1982

The Judge Bates House is a historic mansion in Houston, Mississippi, U.S.. It was built from 1845 to 1850 for J. C. Keeney. It was sold to William Stout Bates in January 1864, in the midst of the American Civil War of 1861–1865. Judge Bates served in the Confederate States Army during the war. His grandson, Winfield Bates Tabb, who served as the mayor of Houston from 1925 to 1928, lived in the house. The house stayed in the Bates family until 1981. It has been listed on the National Register of Historic Places since May 6, 1982.
