= Houston High School (Mississippi) =

Location
- 634 Starkville Road; Houston, Mississippi; Chickasaw County 38851; United States; 33.8908°N 88.9947°W

Information
- Type: Public high school
- School district: Chickasaw County School District
- Principal: Zane Thomas
- Staff: 34.52 (FTE)
- Grades: 9–12
- Student to teacher ratio: 14.80
- Colors: Maroon and white
- Mascot: Hilltopper
- Website: www.chickasaw.k12.ms.us/o/hhs

Houston High School is a high school in Houston, Mississippi, United States. It was formerly a part of the Houston School District until July 1, 2021 when the district was merged with the Chickasaw County School District.

Houston High School was identified by the University of Southern Mississippi as a model site for School wide Positive Behavior Interventions and Supports (SWPBIS). Houston High School's graduation rate was 89.1% for the 2017−2018 school year, an increase of 30 points from its graduation rate in 2010.

In 2018, the Houston High School Solar Car Race Team won its 15th consecutive championship in The Solar Car Challenge. The Houston Solar Car Team was featured in an IMAX film that followed the team to Australia for the World Solar Challenge, at which Houston High School won the World Solar Challenge Adventure Class and set a World Solar Challenge record for most miles raced in a single day – 252 miles. The team's car, Sundancer, has been displayed at the Smithsonian Institution.

== Notable alumni ==
- Will Echoles, college football defensive tackle for the Ole Miss Rebels
- Chris Jones, defensive tackle for the Kansas City Chiefs
