= Hohenlinden, Mississippi =

- Unincorporated community
- Location within Mississippi Location within the United States
- Coordinates: 33°43′44″N 89°09′49″W
- Country: United States
- State: Mississippi
- County: Webster
- Elevation: 417 ft (127 m)
- Time zone: UTC-6 (Central (CST))
  - Summer (DST): UTC-5 (CDT)
- ZIP code: 39751
- Area code: 662
- GNIS feature ID: 671274

Hohenlinden is an unincorporated community located in Webster County, Mississippi, United States. Hohenlinden is approximately 17.4 miles (28.0 km) southwest of Houston, Mississippi and was named for the Bavarian village of Hohenlinden, site of the Battle of Hohenlinden in 1800.
