= Reid, Mississippi =

- Unincorporated community
- Location within Mississippi Location within the United States
- Coordinates: 34°00′08″N 89°11′43″W
- Country: United States
- State: Mississippi
- County: Calhoun
- Elevation: 472 ft (144 m)
- Time zone: UTC-6 (Central (CST))
  - Summer (DST): UTC-5 (CDT)
- Area code: 662
- GNIS feature ID: 676597

Reid is an unincorporated community in Calhoun County, Mississippi, United States.

A post office operated under the name Reid from 1880 to 1929.

Gulf Oil Corporation operated a natural gas well in Reid prior to it being shut-in.
