= Walter Stanley Mooneyham =

Walter Stanley Mooneyham (14 January 1926 in Houston, Mississippi – 3 June 1991 California) was an American evangelical visionary.

== Biography ==
Walter was born on January 14, 1926, in Houston, Mississippi.

He authored the books, "Is There Life Before Death?", "Come Walk the World, "China: A New Day", "Sea of Heartbreak" and "Dancing on the Strait and Narrow" while traveling 70% of the time. He also had success in gaining audiences with world leaders to initiate needed humanitarian change, saving lives. While with National Association of Evangelicals, he started as Editor of 'United Evangelical Action (1959–1964), later he was Vice President of the Billy Graham Evangelistic Association', during which time he moved his family to Berlin, Germany to join the first World Congress on Evangelism. After this, they moved to Singapore for the Southeast Asia Congress on Evangelism. '(1967–1969) And then became President of the Christian humanitarian NGO World Vision (1969–1982).

In 1982, after the invasion of Lebanon by Israeli forces, Mooneyham led a convoy to the Palestinian refugee camps near Sidon and Tyre. Being appalled by the conditions and treatment of the people, he protested the Israeli actions and issued statements to the U.S. press, which were published. These actions caused severe attacks from conservative evangelicals as well as from the Israeli Prime-minister Menachem Begin. Although under pressure, he did not retract his statements but arranged for the publication of a report about the situation in the September issue of World Vision Magazine. He described Israeli actions as "reminiscent of Warsaw.” In the same month, he resigned as president of World Vision International after severe criticism within the World Vision Board; according to Ken Waters (a World Vision employee at that time), accusations ranged from a dictatorial leadership style to an ethnocentric American communication style. Conservative evangelical Ted Engstrom replaced Mooneyham as the new president of World Vision International. After his resignation, Mooneyham became a pastor in Palm Desert, California.

Mooneyham died on June 3, 1991, in Los Angeles, California.

=== Views ===
Mooneyham thought of himself not as liberal or conservative but as pragmatist and his positions were similar to the positions of the U.S. Senator Mark Hatfield, an evangelical who was conservative on issues like abortion but who sided also often with liberals, such as his opposition to the Vietnam War and who was on the board of World Vision at this time. During Mooneyham's leadership, World Vision developed from a small organization near bankruptcy to an organization with a budget of several hundred million dollars. In addition to disaster relief, World Vision introduced a form of development work during Mooneyham's presidency, where evangelism is regarded as an integral part of the organization's operations; Mooneyham viewed evangelism and assistance as going hand in hand.
