= Ripley and New Albany Railroad =

Shortline railroad in Mississippi, United States

Ripley & New Albany Railroad

Overview
- Headquarters: New Albany, Mississippi
- Reporting mark: RNA
- Locale: Southern United States
- Dates of operation: 2011–
- Predecessor: Gulf, Mobile and Ohio Railroad; Illinois Central Railroad; Midsouth Rail; Kansas City Southern Railroad; Mississippi Tennessee Railnet; Mississippi Tennessee Railroad

Technical
- Track gauge: 4 ft 8 1/2 in (1,435 mm) standard gauge
- Length: 27 mi (43 km)

Other
- Website: pioneerlines.com/ripley-and-new-albany-railroad-rna/

The Ripley & New Albany Railroad (reporting mark RNA) is a 27-mile-long (43 km) shortline railroad that runs from New Albany to Falkner, Mississippi, and previously extended from Houston, Mississippi, to Middleton, Tennessee, along former Gulf, Mobile and Ohio Railroad trackage. RNA interchanges with the BNSF Railway in New Albany, Mississippi. It primarily hauls lumber products and Oil-Dri.

== History ==
The first rail link between New Albany and Ripley was chartered by Colonel William C. Falkner, great-grandfather of famous author William Faulkner, in 1871 as The Ripley Railroad. By 1874 the line had been expanded north to Middleton and four years later the name changed to Ship Island, Ripley & Kentucky Railroad. In 1889, the railroad was sold to the Gulf & Chicago Railroad in foreclosure. The northern division of the Gulf and Ship Island railroad was also purchased, expanding the line to Pontotoc, Mississippi.

In 1903, the Mobile, Jackson & Kansas City Railroad started building north from Beaumont, Mississippi, and joined with the Gulf & Chicago. The two railroads merged in 1909 to form the New Orleans, Mobile & Chicago Railroad. In 1917 this railroad was reorganized into the Gulf, Mobile and Northern Railroad and later the Gulf, Mobile and Ohio Railroad (GM&O) in 1940. During these years the famous GM&O train The Rebel ran along this route. The connection to the Frisco Railway (modern day BNSF) in New Albany was an important conduit for traffic along this route with almost all northbound freight being diverted to the Frisco in New Albany.

In 1972, the GM&O merged with the Illinois Central Railroad to form Illinois Central Gulf (ICG). Under ICG, the tracks south of Houston were abandoned. In 1985, ICG sold off this route to the Gulf and Mississippi Railroad, the first regional railroad in the United States, who operated it until 1988 when it was sold to Midsouth Rail. In 1994, Kansas City Southern Railway (KCS) purchased Midsouth and assumed control of this line. In 1998, KCS sold the line to North American RailNet, Inc who named it the Mississippi Tennessee Railnet.

In 2003, Mississippi Tennessee Railnet was sold to Ironhorse Resources, Inc., who changed the name to Mississippi Tennessee Railroad (MTNR). A significant amount of track was abandoned under MTNR's ownership. In 2004 MTNR filed to abandon 43.2 miles (69.5 km) of track from a point just south of New Albany down to Houston, citing low traffic volumes and expensive maintenance costs. In 2008, 16 miles (26 km) of track from Middleton to Falkner was abandoned. The remaining track south of New Albany was used for car storage until 2010, when it was also abandoned. In October 2011, a spur to an industrial park north of New Albany was removed during the expansion of Mississippi Highway 15. In 2011, MTNR received financial support from the towns of Ripley and New Albany to make improvements to the line and began replacing rail ties.

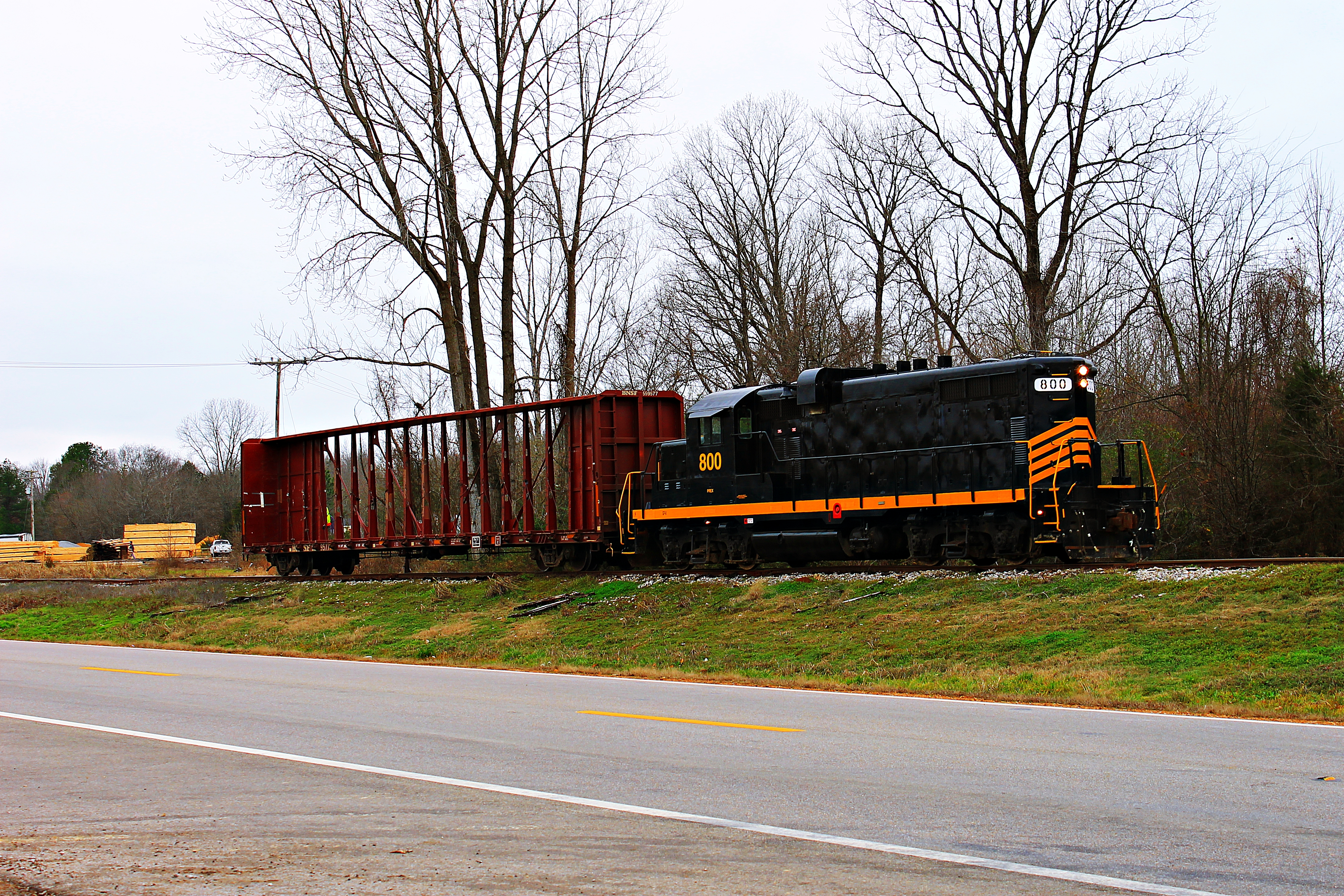
RNA switching lumber in Ripley

On November 10, 2011, Alabama and Florida Railway (a subsidiary of Pioneer Railcorp) filed a petition to acquire and operate the MTNR. The name of the railroad was changed to the Ripley and New Albany Railroad.

== Current operations and abandonments ==
The RNA operates on weekdays. It interchanges with BNSF in downtown New Albany.

The 43.2 miles of abandoned right-of-way between New Albany and Houston is now the Tanglefoot Trail, a paved bike trail.

== Motive power ==
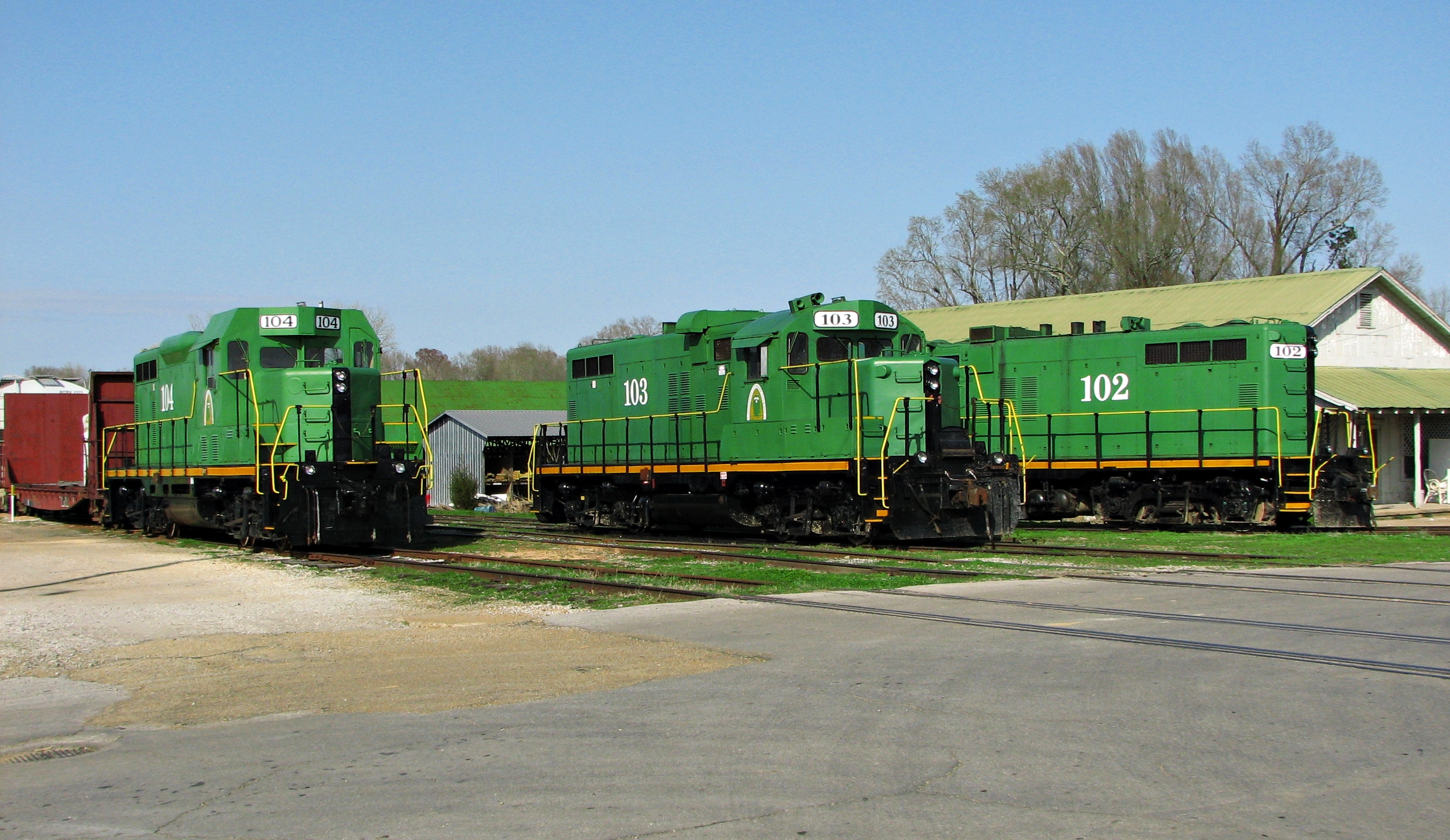
Former MTNR Locomotive Roster.

RNA uses one locomotive to power its trains:

- 1 EMD GP8 (PREX 800)

== General references ==
- "MTNR Website".
- "Ship Island, Ripley & Kentucky Railroad".
- "Gulf & Chicago Railroad".
- "Mobile, Jackson & Kansas City".
- "New Orleans, Mobile & Chicago".
- "Gulf Mobile & Northern".
- "Gulf Mobile & Ohio".
- "Illinois Central".
- "Ironhorse Resources".
- "Abandoned Rails: Beaumont to Houston".
- "KCS Shortline Profile: MTNR" (PDF). Archived from the original (PDF) on 5 May 2012.
- "Alabama & Florida Railway Petition".
