= Okolona, Houston and Calhoun City Railway =

Railway company in Mississippi, USA

Okolona, Houston & Calhoun City Railway
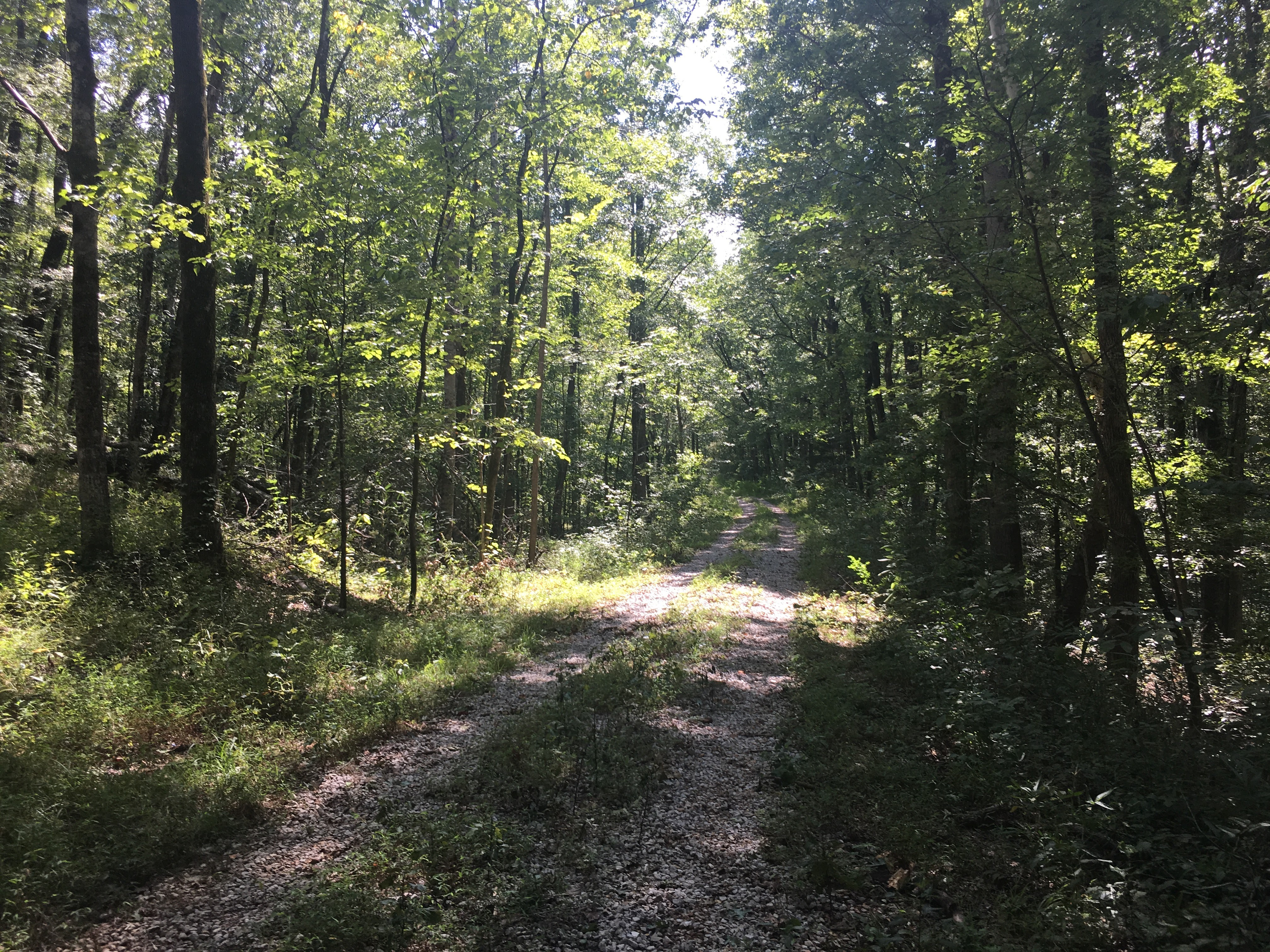
- Former section of the railroad in Tombigbee National Forest

Overview
- Headquarters: Houston, MS
- Reporting mark: OH&CC
- Locale: Mississippi
- Dates of operation: 1933–1939
- Predecessor: Mobile and Ohio Railroad

Technical
- Track gauge: 4 ft 8 1/2 in (1,435 mm) standard gauge
- Length: 38.07 miles

The Okolona, Houston & Calhoun City Railway company was incorporated in Mississippi in 1933 and purchased the 38 mile long Mobile & Ohio branch line running from Okolona to Calhoun City, MS. The railroad offered daily passenger service along the towns served via railbus and several freight trains a week.

Competition from highways eroded traffic on the line and the OH&CC filed to abandon in 1938. By 1940 the tracks were removed.

== Motive Power ==
OH&CC had two steam locomotives and a railbus in their roster:

- Baldwin Locomotive Works 4-6-0 # 9
- Rogers Locomotive and Machine Works 4-6-0 # 184
- Gasoline powered railbus (Converted from a Greyhound bus)

== Preservation ==
- The OH&CC depot in Houston, Mississippi, survives as a farm implement dealership.
- A horse trail was built in the Tombigbee National Forest on the former railroad grade.
