= Calhoun County, Mississippi =

County in Mississippi, United States

- County
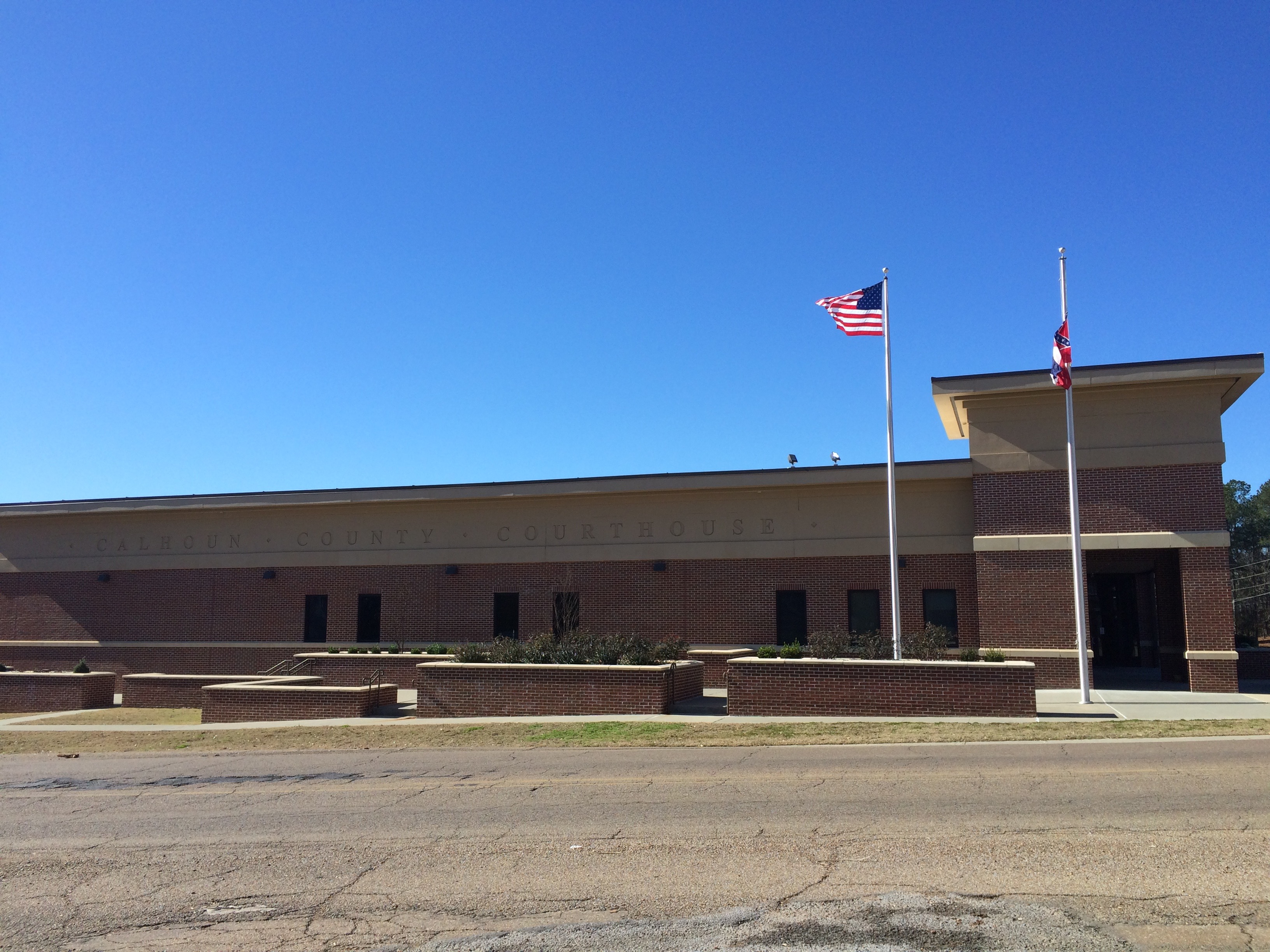
- East façade of Calhoun County Courthouse in Pittsboro

- Location within the U.S. state of Mississippi
- Coordinates: 33°56′N 89°20′W
- Country: United States
- State: Mississippi
- Founded: 1852
- Named for: John C. Calhoun
- Seat: Pittsboro
- Largest town: Bruce

Area
  - Total: 588 sq mi (1,520 km^{2})
  - Land: 587 sq mi (1,520 km^{2})
  - Water: 1.4 sq mi (3.6 km^{2}) 0.2%

Population (2020)
  - Total: 13,266
  - Estimate (2025): 12,643 ▼
  - Density: 22.6/sq mi (8.73/km^{2})
- Time zone: UTC−6 (Central)
  - Summer (DST): UTC−5 (CDT)
- Congressional district: 1st
- Website: calhouncoms.com

Calhoun County is a county located in the U.S. state of Mississippi. As of the 2020 census, the population was 13,266. Its county seat is Pittsboro. The county is named after John C. Calhoun, the U.S. Vice President and U.S. Senator from South Carolina.

== Geography ==
According to the U.S. Census Bureau, the county has a total area of 588 square miles (1,520 km^{2}), of which 587 square miles (1,520 km^{2}) is land and 1.4 square miles (3.6 km^{2}) (0.2%) is water.

=== Adjacent counties ===
- Lafayette County (north)
- Pontotoc County (northeast)
- Chickasaw County (east)
- Webster County (south)
- Grenada County (southwest)
- Yalobusha County (west)

== Transportation ==
=== Major highways ===
- Mississippi Highway 8
- Mississippi Highway 9
- Mississippi Highway 32
- Mississippi Highway 9W
- Mississippi Highway 330

=== Airport ===
The Calhoun County Airport is a county-owned public-use airport located one nautical mile (1.2 mi; 1.9 km) southwest of the central business district of Pittsboro, Mississippi.

== Demographics ==
Historical population
Census	Pop.	Note	%±
1860	9,518		—
1870	10,561		11.0%
1880	13,492		27.8%
1900	16,512		—
1910	17,726		7.4%
1920	16,823		−5.1%
1930	18,080		7.5%
1940	20,893		15.6%
1950	18,369		−12.1%
1960	15,941		−13.2%
1970	14,623		−8.3%
1980	15,664		7.1%
1990	14,908		−4.8%
2000	15,069		1.1%
2010	14,962		−0.7%
2020	13,266		−11.3%
2025 (est.)	12,643	▼	−4.7%
U.S. Decennial Census; 1790-1960 1900-1990; 1990-2000 2010-2013

=== Racial and ethnic composition ===
Calhoun County, Mississippi – Racial and ethnic composition Note: the US Census treats Hispanic/Latino as an ethnic category. This table excludes Latinos from the racial categories and assigns them to a separate category. Hispanics/Latinos may be of any race.
Race / Ethnicity (NH = Non-Hispanic)	Pop 1980	Pop 1990	Pop 2000	Pop 2010	Pop 2020	% 1980	% 1990	% 2000	% 2010	% 2020
White alone (NH)	11,597	10,788	10,339	9,851	8,662	74.04%	72.36%	68.61%	65.84%	65.29%
Black or African American alone (NH)	3,956	4,024	4,308	4,128	3,444	25.26%	26.99%	28.59%	27.59%	25.96%
Native American or Alaska Native alone (NH)	11	12	20	17	15	0.07%	0.08%	0.13%	0.11%	0.11%
Asian alone (NH)	6	3	9	15	17	0.04%	0.02%	0.06%	0.10%	0.13%
Native Hawaiian or Pacific Islander alone (NH)	x	x	0	2	0	x	x	0.00%	0.01%	0.00%
Other race alone (NH)	0	3	6	1	18	0.00%	0.02%	0.04%	0.01%	0.14%
Mixed race or Multiracial (NH)	x	x	69	143	363	x	x	0.46%	0.96%	2.74%
Hispanic or Latino (any race)	94	78	318	805	747	0.60%	0.52%	2.11%	5.38%	5.63%
Total	15,664	14,908	15,069	14,962	13,266	100.00%	100.00%	100.00%	100.00%	100.00%

=== 2020 census ===
As of the 2020 census, the county had a population of 13,266. The median age was 44.9 years. 21.4% of residents were under the age of 18 and 22.0% of residents were 65 years of age or older. For every 100 females there were 97.6 males, and for every 100 females age 18 and over there were 93.6 males age 18 and over.

The racial makeup of the county was 66.2% White, 26.1% Black or African American, 0.2% American Indian and Alaska Native, 0.1% Asian, <0.1% Native Hawaiian and Pacific Islander, 3.7% from some other race, and 3.6% from two or more races. Hispanic or Latino residents of any race comprised 5.6% of the population.

<0.1% of residents lived in urban areas, while 100.0% lived in rural areas.

There were 5,543 households in the county, of which 28.5% had children under the age of 18 living in them. Of all households, 41.9% were married-couple households, 20.8% were households with a male householder and no spouse or partner present, and 32.1% were households with a female householder and no spouse or partner present. About 32.2% of all households were made up of individuals and 15.5% had someone living alone who was 65 years of age or older.

There were 6,720 housing units, of which 17.5% were vacant. Among occupied housing units, 71.5% were owner-occupied and 28.5% were renter-occupied. The homeowner vacancy rate was 0.9% and the rental vacancy rate was 25.6%.

=== 2000 census ===
As of the census of 2000, there were 15,069 people, 6,019 households, and 4,255 families residing in the county. The population density was 26 people per square mile (10 people/km^{2}). There were 6,902 housing units at an average density of 12 per square mile (4.6/km^{2}). The racial makeup of the county was 69.41% White or Caucasian, 28.65% Black or African American, 0.13% Native American, 0.06% Asian, 0.03% Pacific Islander, 1.11% from other races, and 0.59% from two or more races. 2.11% of the population were Hispanic or Latino of any race.

According to the census of 2000, the largest ancestry groups in Calhoun County were English 64.4%, African 29% and Scots-Irish 4.5%

There were 6,019 households, out of which 31.60% had children under the age of 18 living with them, 51.00% were married couples living together, 15.40% had a female householder with no husband present, and 29.30% were non-families. 27.10% of all households were made up of individuals, and 13.90% had someone living alone who was 65 years of age or older. The average household size was 2.46 and the average family size was 2.97.

In the county, the population was spread out, with 25.20% under the age of 18, 8.40% from 18 to 24, 27.00% from 25 to 44, 22.70% from 45 to 64, and 16.70% who were 65 years of age or older. The median age was 37 years. For every 100 females there were 90.70 males. For every 100 females age 18 and over, there were 87.00 males.

The median income for a household in the county was $27,113, and the median income for a family was $34,407. Males had a median income of $26,458 versus $19,491 for females. The per capita income for the county was $15,106. About 14.90% of families and 18.10% of the population were below the poverty line, including 24.20% of those under age 18 and 21.80% of those age 65 or over.

== Education ==
Public education is provided by the Calhoun County School District. In addition to the public high schools of Bruce, Calhoun City, and Vardaman, Calhoun Academy is a small K-12 private school which was founded as a segregation academy, located between Pittsboro and Calhoun City. This private school serves Calhoun and the surrounding counties. Calhoun academy's sports mascot is the cougar; Bruce's mascot is a Trojan; Calhoun City's mascot is a wildcat; and Vardaman's mascot is a ram.

== Communities ==
=== Towns ===
- Bruce
- Calhoun City
- Derma
- Vardaman

=== Villages ===
- Big Creek
- Pittsboro (county seat)
- Slate Springs

=== Unincorporated communities ===
- Banner
- Bently
- Dentontown
- Ellard
- Hollis
- Loyd
- Reid
- Sabougla
- Sarepta
- Skuna

=== Ghost towns ===
- Hopewell
- Old Town

== Politics ==
United States presidential election results for Calhoun County, Mississippi
Year	Republican		Democratic		Third party(ies)	
Year	No.	%	No.	%	No.	%
1912	17	1.61%	937	88.82%	101	9.57%
1916	45	3.45%	1,225	93.94%	34	2.61%
1920	160	14.87%	875	81.32%	41	3.81%
1924	69	4.94%	1,129	80.82%	199	14.24%
1928	283	18.14%	1,277	81.86%	0	0.00%
1932	27	1.38%	1,923	98.41%	4	0.20%
1936	40	2.31%	1,691	97.58%	2	0.12%
1940	74	3.64%	1,958	96.36%	0	0.00%
1944	97	4.47%	2,072	95.53%	0	0.00%
1948	36	1.90%	786	41.41%	1,076	56.69%
1952	691	23.23%	2,284	76.77%	0	0.00%
1956	301	13.58%	1,763	79.52%	153	6.90%
1960	383	15.65%	765	31.26%	1,299	53.09%
1964	3,224	91.64%	294	8.36%	0	0.00%
1968	394	7.17%	276	5.02%	4,823	87.80%
1972	3,023	90.37%	245	7.32%	77	2.30%
1976	1,892	39.52%	2,724	56.89%	172	3.59%
1980	2,579	42.85%	3,295	54.74%	145	2.41%
1984	3,579	67.06%	1,749	32.77%	9	0.17%
1988	3,375	61.55%	2,086	38.04%	22	0.40%
1992	3,191	50.87%	2,462	39.25%	620	9.88%
1996	2,470	49.19%	2,178	43.38%	373	7.43%
2000	3,448	59.88%	2,251	39.09%	59	1.02%
2004	4,131	64.66%	2,234	34.97%	24	0.38%
2008	4,467	63.51%	2,522	35.85%	45	0.64%
2012	4,412	62.42%	2,586	36.59%	70	0.99%
2016	4,390	68.64%	1,910	29.86%	96	1.50%
2020	4,625	70.18%	1,902	28.86%	63	0.96%
2024	4,443	73.63%	1,547	25.64%	44	0.73%

== See also ==
- Dry counties
- National Register of Historic Places listings in Calhoun County, Mississippi
