= Merchants and Farmers Bank Building =

- U.S. National Register of Historic Places
- Location within Mississippi Location within the United States
- Location: 423 Main St., Okolona, Mississippi
- Coordinates: 34°0′15″N 88°44′56″W
- Area: less than one acre
- Built: 1903
- Architectural style: Richardsonian Romanesque
- NRHP reference No.: 87000733
- Added to NRHP: May 14, 1987

The Merchants and Farmers Bank Building is a historic two-story arched stone bank building constructed in 1903 in Okolona, Mississippi. It was listed on the National Register of Historic Places on May 14, 1987. It is located at 245 West Main Street. The building is an example of Richardsonian Romanesque architecture; the interior includes a tin coffered ceiling.

== See also ==
- National Register of Historic Places listings in Mississippi § Chickasaw County
