= Woodland, Mississippi =

- Village
- Flag

- Location of Woodland, Mississippi
- Coordinates: 33°46′45″N 89°3′4″W
- Country: United States
- State: Mississippi
- County: Chickasaw

Area
  - Total: 0.57 sq mi (1.47 km^{2})
  - Land: 0.57 sq mi (1.47 km^{2})
  - Water: 0 sq mi (0.00 km^{2})
- Elevation: 322 ft (98 m)

Population (2020)
  - Total: 110
  - Density: 193.9/sq mi (74.87/km^{2})
- Time zone: UTC-6 (Central (CST))
  - Summer (DST): UTC-5 (CDT)
- ZIP code: 39776
- Area code: 662
- FIPS code: 28-81000
- GNIS feature ID: 0679839

Woodland is a village in Chickasaw County, Mississippi, United States. As of the 2020 census, Woodland had a population of 110. The mayor of Woodland is Patti Watkins.

== Geography ==
According to the United States Census Bureau, the village has a total area of 0.6 square miles (1.6 km^{2}), all land.

== Demographics ==
Historical population
Census	Pop.	Note	%±
1910	156		—
1970	130		—
1980	135		3.8%
1990	182		34.8%
2000	159		−12.6%
2010	125		−21.4%
2020	110		−12.0%
U.S. Decennial Census

As of the census of 2000, there were 159 people, 59 households, and 42 families residing in the village. The population density was 280.3 inhabitants per square mile (108.2/km^{2}). There were 60 housing units at an average density of 105.8 units per square mile (40.8 units/km^{2}). The racial makeup of the village was 50.31% White, 44.65% African American, 4.40% from other races, and 0.63% from two or more races. Hispanic or Latino of any race were 9.43% of the population.

There were 59 households, out of which 44.1% had children under the age of 18 living with them, 47.5% were married couples living together, 20.3% had a female householder with no husband present, and 28.8% were non-families. 25.4% of all households were made up of individuals, and 8.5% had someone living alone who was 65 years of age or older. The average household size was 2.69 and the average family size was 3.19.

In the village, the population was spread out, with 33.3% under the age of 18, 10.1% from 18 to 24, 31.4% from 25 to 44, 13.8% from 45 to 64, and 11.3% who were 65 years of age or older. The median age was 30 years. For every 100 females, there were 101.3 males. For every 100 females age 18 and over, there were 103.8 males.

The median income for a household in the village was $21,000, and the median income for a family was $26,250. Males had a median income of $23,750 versus $16,250 for females. The per capita income for the village was $17,283. About 17.1% of families and 17.6% of the population were below the poverty line, including 11.5% of those under the age of eighteen and 15.8% of those 65 or over.

== Education ==
The Village of Woodland is served by the Houston School District.

== Notable person ==
- Bobbie Gentry, singer-songwriter
