= Houston, Mississippi =

- City
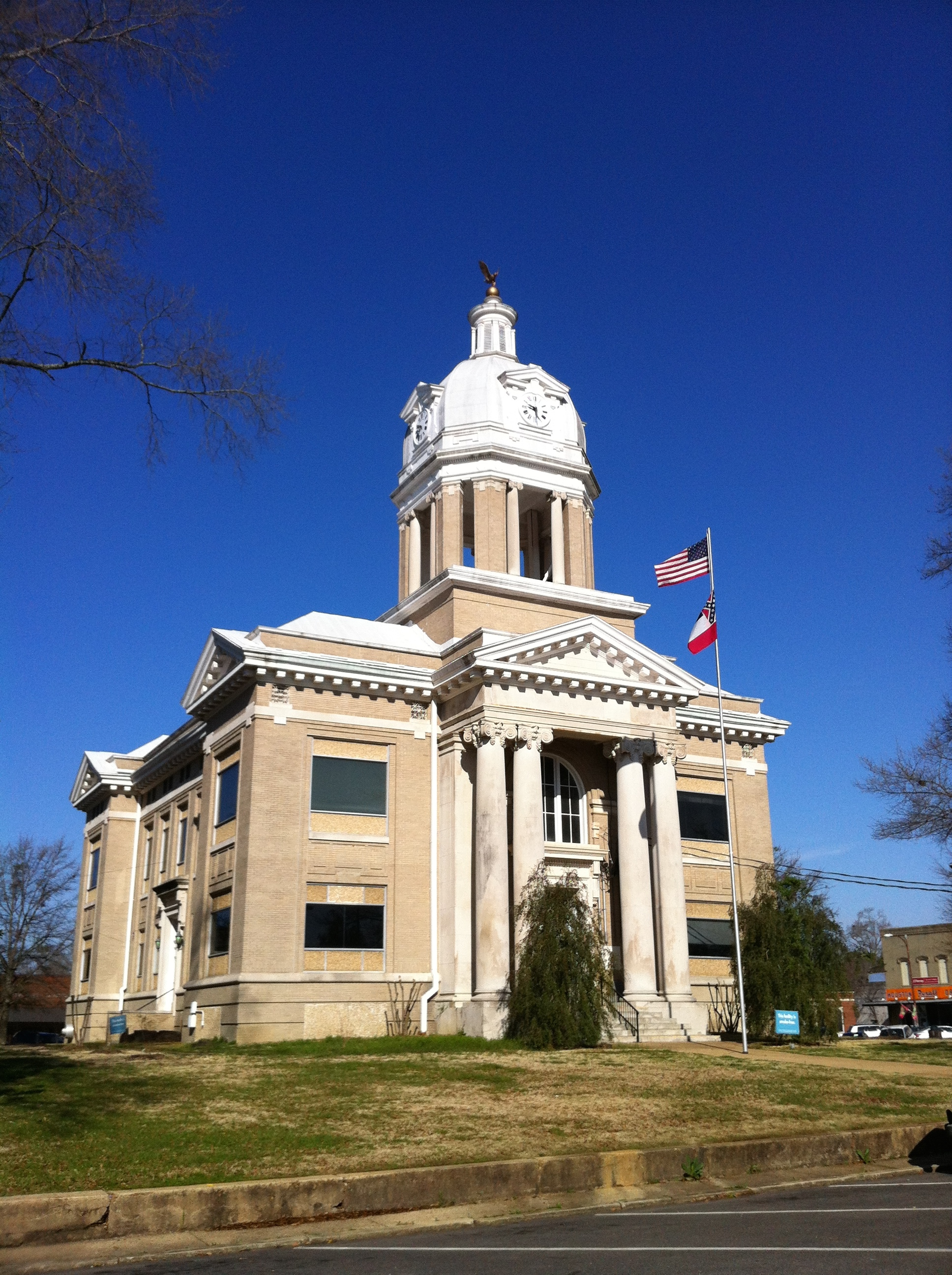
- Chickasaw County Courthouse in Houston

- Flag

- Location of Houston, Mississippi

- Location in the United States
- Coordinates: 33°53′53″N 89°00′06″W
- Country: United States
- State: Mississippi
- County: Chickasaw

Area
  - Total: 7.39 sq mi (19.15 km^{2})
  - Land: 7.38 sq mi (19.11 km^{2})
  - Water: 0.019 sq mi (0.05 km^{2})
- Elevation: 354 ft (108 m)

Population (2020)
  - Total: 3,797
  - Density: 514.7/sq mi (198.74/km^{2})
- Time zone: UTC-6 (Central (CST))
  - Summer (DST): UTC-5 (CDT)
- ZIP code: 38851
- Area code: 662
- FIPS code: 28-33900
- GNIS feature ID: 0693543
- Website: www.houston.ms.gov

Houston is a city and one of two county seats of Chickasaw County, in northeastern Mississippi, United States. As of the 2020 census, Houston had a population of 3,797.

== History ==
Native American groups had long used the future Chickasaw County for millennia before the coming of European settler colonialists. Eventually the natives were essentially forced out of the area. An 1832 treaty finally made the area secure for settlement, and emigrants rapidly moved in. The formation of Chickasaw County was authorized on February 9, 1836, and a few days later a committee was authorized to determine the location of the county seat. Judge Joel Pinson offered to donate land for development of this seat, and on July 8, 1836, his offer was accepted. Pinson named the settlement Houston in honor of Sam Houston, a childhood friend.

Construction began that year on a brick courthouse on the village square, and a jail one block north. The city of Houston was incorporated on May 9, 1837, and its first post office was authorized on December 5 of that same year. This means that Houston, Mississippi actually predates Houston, Texas, because the latter was incorporated one month later, on June 5, 1837.

The Civil War brought widespread ruin and loss to the county, including an incident when Union troops burned nearly all the county's records as workers tried to move them out for safekeeping. During the following decade, the nearly-moribund economy slowly recovered, but poor roads across the area continued to hamper commerce and daily life. To address this shortcoming, in 1866 the state authorized a second judicial district to be based in Okolona, while allowing the existing facilities in Houston to continue. Thus, the county became one of the few in the nation to host two bases for its court system.

In 1909, Houston became home to the first Carnegie library in the state, after local school superintendent L. B. Reid's request for a public library was approved by philanthropist Andrew Carnegie, who had created a matching program for libraries. Also in 1909, an African American man, Robbie Daskin, was lynched for allegedly killing a preacher.

In 1906, Southern Railway extended a rail line through Houston, operated by the Mobile and Ohio Railroad. A station and passenger service were open in Houston by 1910. The line sold in 1933 to form the Okolona, Houston and Calhoun City Railway, which operated service from Okolona, through Houston to Calhoun City until 1940, when the company was dissolved and the rails were removed.

Houston hosts the Mississippi Flywheel Festival in April and September of every year.

== Geography ==
Houston is located west of the center of Chickasaw County. Mississippi Highway 8 passes through the city, leading east 29 miles (47 km) to Aberdeen and west 18 miles (29 km) to Calhoun City. Mississippi Highway 15 bypasses the city to the west, crossing Highway 8 within a western extension of the city limits. Highway 15 leads north 26 miles (42 km) to Pontotoc and south 27 miles (43 km) to Mathiston. The Natchez Trace Parkway passes about 3 miles (5 km) east of the city center; the Trace followed an ancient Native American trail.

According to the United States Census Bureau, the city has a total area of 7.39 square miles (19.15 km^{2}), of which 7.38 square miles (19.11 km^{2}) is land and 0.02 square miles (0.05 km^{2}), or 0.25%, is water.

=== Climate ===
The climate in this area is characterized by hot, humid summers and generally mild to cool winters. According to the Köppen Climate Classification system, Houston has a humid subtropical climate, abbreviated "Cfa" on climate maps.

Climate data for Houston, Mississippi (1991–2020)
Month	Jan	Feb	Mar	Apr	May	Jun	Jul	Aug	Sep	Oct	Nov	Dec	Year
Mean daily maximum °F (°C)	52.6 (11.4)	57.5 (14.2)	66.4 (19.1)	74.0 (23.3)	81.6 (27.6)	88.2 (31.2)	90.2 (32.3)	90.6 (32.6)	86.1 (30.1)	76.1 (24.5)	64.2 (17.9)	55.4 (13.0)	73.6 (23.1)
Daily mean °F (°C)	42.5 (5.8)	46.3 (7.9)	54.6 (12.6)	62.0 (16.7)	70.4 (21.3)	77.7 (25.4)	80.3 (26.8)	79.6 (26.4)	74.2 (23.4)	63.0 (17.2)	52.2 (11.2)	45.1 (7.3)	62.3 (16.8)
Mean daily minimum °F (°C)	32.3 (0.2)	35.1 (1.7)	42.8 (6.0)	49.9 (9.9)	59.1 (15.1)	67.2 (19.6)	70.3 (21.3)	68.6 (20.3)	62.3 (16.8)	50.0 (10.0)	40.2 (4.6)	34.9 (1.6)	51.1 (10.6)
Average precipitation inches (mm)	5.12 (130)	5.80 (147)	5.14 (131)	6.08 (154)	5.67 (144)	5.59 (142)	4.13 (105)	4.66 (118)	3.49 (89)	3.36 (85)	4.50 (114)	5.80 (147)	59.34 (1,506)
Average snowfall inches (cm)	0.6 (1.5)	0.2 (0.51)	0.0 (0.0)	0.0 (0.0)	0.0 (0.0)	0.0 (0.0)	0.0 (0.0)	0.0 (0.0)	0.0 (0.0)	0.0 (0.0)	0.0 (0.0)	0.0 (0.0)	0.8 (2.01)
Source: NOAA

== Demographics ==
Historical population
Census	Pop.	Note	%±
1870	400		—
1880	480		20.0%
1890	893		86.0%
1900	677		−24.2%
1910	1,400		106.8%
1920	1,408		0.6%
1930	1,477		4.9%
1940	1,729		17.1%
1950	1,664		−3.8%
1960	2,577		54.9%
1970	2,720		5.5%
1980	3,745		37.7%
1990	3,903		4.2%
2000	4,079		4.5%
2010	3,623		−11.2%
2020	3,797		4.8%
U.S. Decennial Census

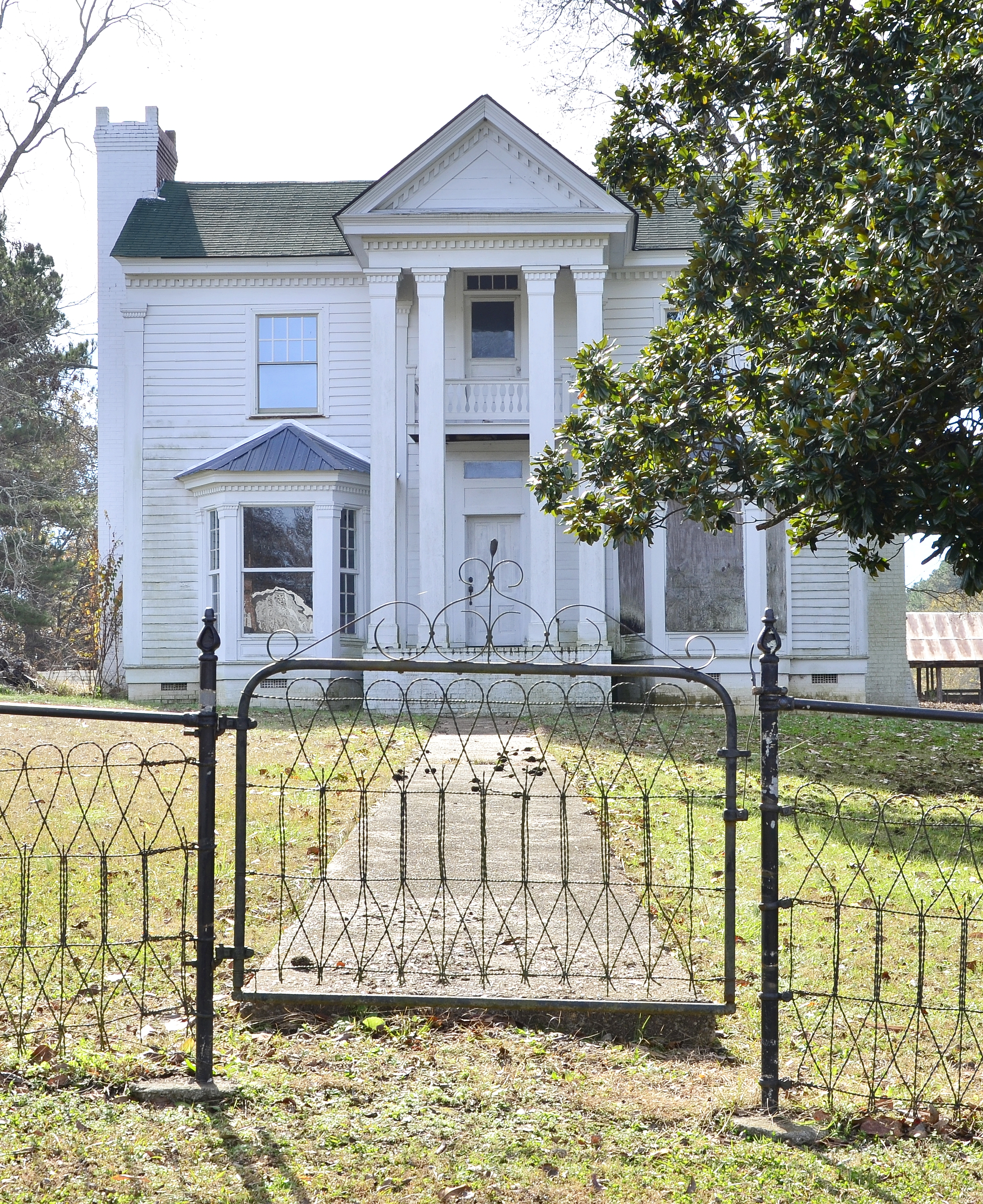
Judge Bates House in Houston is listed on the National Register of Historic Places.

=== 2020 census ===
As of the 2020 census, Houston had a population of 3,797. There were 1,497 households, including 917 family households.

The median age was 36.3 years. 27.4% of residents were under the age of 18 and 17.6% were 65 years of age or older. For every 100 females, there were 80.0 males, and for every 100 females age 18 and over, there were 74.4 males.

0.0% of residents lived in urban areas, while 100.0% lived in rural areas.

Among households, 36.5% had children under the age of 18 living in them. Of all households, 33.5% were married-couple households, 15.8% had a male householder with no spouse or partner present, and 44.9% had a female householder with no spouse or partner present. About 31.6% of households were made up of individuals, and 13.9% had someone living alone who was 65 years of age or older.

There were 1,645 housing units, of which 9.0% were vacant. The homeowner vacancy rate was 2.2% and the rental vacancy rate was 9.3%.

Houston racial composition
Race	Num.	Perc.
White	1,672	44.03%
Black or African American	1,726	45.46%
Native American	3	0.08%
Asian	11	0.29%
Other/Mixed	99	2.61%
Hispanic or Latino	286	7.53%

=== 2000 census ===
As of the census of 2000, there were 4,079 people, 1,589 households, and 1,088 families residing in the city. The population density was 537.4 inhabitants per square mile (207.5/km^{2}). There were 1,721 housing units at an average density of 226.8 per square mile (87.6/km^{2}). The racial makeup of the city was 59.89% White, 36.58% African American, 0.27% Native American, 0.17% Asian, 0.12% Pacific Islander, 2.70% from other races, and 0.27% from two or more races. Hispanic or Latino people of any race were 5.12% of the population.

There were 1,589 households, out of which 33.5% had children under the age of 18 living with them, 44.6% were married couples living together, 19.4% had a female householder with no husband present, and 31.5% were non-families. 29.1% of all households were made up of individuals, and 15.0% had someone living alone who was 65 years of age or older. The average household size was 2.49 and the average family size was 3.06.

In the city, the population was spread out, with 26.6% under the age of 18, 10.3% from 18 to 24, 26.9% from 25 to 44, 19.5% from 45 to 64, and 16.8% who were 65 years of age or older. The median age was 35 years. For every 100 females, there were 88.3 males. For every 100 females age 18 and over, there were 83.6 males.

The median income for a household in the city was $23,709, and the median income for a family was $31,979. Males had a median income of $27,214 versus $22,000 for females. The per capita income for the city was $12,482. About 22.6% of families and 21.2% of the population were below the poverty line, including 17.8% of those under age 18 and 28.0% of those age 65 or over.

== Education ==
Houston is served by the Chickasaw County School District, a public school district headquartered in Houston. The district was created on July 1, 2021, through the consolidation of the former Houston School District and the former Chickasaw County School District, pursuant to Mississippi Code Annotated §37-7-104.8(7). Prior to the merger, the Houston School District operated Houston High School, Houston Middle School, Houston Upper Elementary School, and Houston Lower Elementary School.

Houston High School is the community's public high school, serving grades 9-12. In 2016, the school was identified by the University of Southern Mississippi as a model site for Schoolwide Positive Behavior Interventions and Supports (SWPBIS). The school's four-year graduation rate rose significantly between 2010 and the 2017-18 school year, reaching 89.1 percent, an increase of about 30 percentage points over the earlier figure.

=== Solar car program ===
Houston High School's solar car program, the Sundancer/Houston Solar Race Team, has been a successful program in the Solar Car Challenge, a national high-school engineering competition founded in 1993 and sponsored by Texas Instruments, Oncor, and Lockheed Martin.

The Houston Public Schools system is home to 11-time National Dell-Winston Solar Car Challenge Championships. The team won the Open Division of the competition (known through 2010 as the Dell-Winston School Solar Car Challenge) for 14 consecutive years, and claimed its 15th consecutive national championship in 2018.

In October 2015, the team's car, "Sundancer", became the first high school vehicle to complete and win the Adventure Class of the World Solar Challenge in Australia, a roughly 1,800-mile intercollegiate and international race, and set a World Solar Challenge single-day distance record of 252 miles. The Mississippi State Legislature commended the team in a 2016 concurrent resolution. In April 2017, the team and "Sundancer" traveled to Washington, D.C., for the premiere of the IMAX film Dream Big: Engineering Our World, narrated by Jeff Bridges and directed by Greg MacGillivray, in which the car was featured; "Sundancer" was also displayed at the Smithsonian Institution as part of the event.

== Infrastructure ==
=== Transportation ===
Houston was once served by both the Gulf, Mobile and Ohio Railroad and Okolona, Houston and Calhoun City Railway. In the early 21st century, both of these rail lines were abandoned. Sections of the former have been converted to a recreational trail.

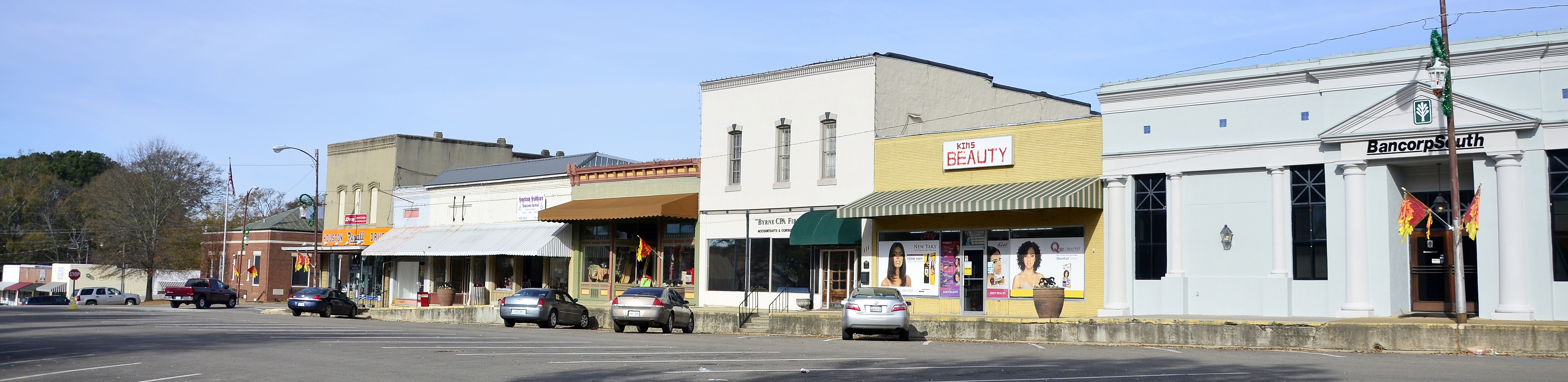
East Washington Street in Houston

== Notable people ==
- Dee Barton, film and big band composer, Stan Kenton Orchestra drummer, Jackson State University composer in residence
- David R. Bowen, U.S. Representative from Mississippi's 2nd congressional district 1973–1983
- N. W. Bradford, member of the Mississippi State Senate (1916–1920), and of the Mississippi House of Representatives (1904–1908)
- T. Jeff Busby, U.S. Representative 1923–1935
- Terry Catledge, NBA player
- William R. Dunlap, artist, writer, and arts commentator
- Chris Jones, NFL player
- Ricky Love, former professional basketball player
- Walter Stanley Mooneyham, evangelical author
- Rosa Lee Tucker (1866–1946), Mississippi State Librarian
- William F. Tucker, brigadier general in the Confederate States Army and member of the Mississippi House of Representatives
- Howard Waldrop (1946–2024), science fiction author
- Bukka White, Delta blues guitarist
