= East Tallahatchie School District =

Public school district based in Charleston, Mississippi

The East Tallahatchie School District (ETSD) is a public school district based in Charleston, Mississippi, United States.

In addition to Charleston, it serves Tippo.

== History ==
For much of the county's history, public education was only for white students. In 1917, Tallahatchie Agricultural High School was opened as a boarding school to educate black children, and separate schools were maintained for educating black and white children. Before 1970, a dual system of schools, one for black students and another for whites, was maintained, although the black school was closed during the Great Depression due to a shortage of funding. With the federal case Alexander v. Holmes County Board of Education in 1970, segregated schools were deemed illegal, so the school district came up with a plan for "integrating" the schools. The chosen plan kept students and teachers segregated by classroom, but bused students back and forth between East Tallahatchie High School and Allen Carver High School during the day, so both schools were technically integrated, although blacks and whites were kept separate. Blacks were not allowed to serve on student government, or as cheerleaders. Many of the black students of Allen Carver protested this arrangement. In response, the sheriff of Tallahatchie County was summoned, and arrested 125 of them, who were briefly incarcerated at the Mississippi State Penitentiary in Parchman. The US Federal Government's Community Relations Service intervened, and eventually convinced the school board to relent. The 125 students who had been arrested were allowed back in school, and given the opportunity to take exams that had been missed. The schools were truly integrated at the classroom level, and new elections were held to give black children the opportunity to participate in student government, cheerleading, and the adoption of a new school mascot.

In 1992 the district began a project of installing air conditioners in its classrooms, which was completed by 1993.

Charleston High School held its first racially integrated prom in April 2008. This event was the subject of the 2008 HBO documentary Prom Night in Mississippi. The documentary focused on Charleston High School and the efforts to have a mixed prom instead of the traditional racially segregated proms.

== Schools ==
- Charleston High School
- Charleston Middle School
  - In 1999 the band room was renovated.
- Charleston Elementary School
  - In 1989 the state awarded funding to have a computer lab built. The school then served kindergarten through grade 3.

Former schools

- Charleston Upper Elementary School

== See also ==
- List of school districts in Mississippi
