= National Register of Historic Places listings in Yalobusha County, Mississippi =

Location of Yalobusha County in Mississippi

This is a list of the National Register of Historic Places listings in Yalobusha County, Mississippi.

This is intended to be a complete list of the properties and districts on the National Register of Historic Places in Yalobusha County, Mississippi, United States. Latitude and longitude coordinates are provided for many National Register properties and districts; these locations may be seen together in a map.

There are 4 properties and districts listed on the National Register in the county. Another 2 properties were once listed but have been removed.

This National Park Service list is complete through NPS recent listings posted May 9, 2025.

== Current listings ==
	Name on the Register	Image	Date listed	Location	City or town	Description
1	Simmons House	Simmons House	March 5, 2020 (#100005035)	120 McLarty Cir. 34°08′51″N 89°37′55″W	Water Valley	
2	US Post Office-Water Valley	US Post Office-Water Valley	April 18, 1985 (#85000845)	501 N. Main St. 34°09′14″N 89°37′53″W	Water Valley	
3	Walker High School		March 3, 2025 (#100011484)	Hwy 51 North, Springhill Road. 34°01′45″N 89°54′35″W	Oakland vicinity	
4	Water Valley Main Street Historic District	Water Valley Main Street Historic District	March 26, 2012 (#12000158)	Roughly along Main from Young to Market Sts. 34°09′08″N 89°37′53″W	Water Valley	

=== Former listings ===
	Name on the Register	Image	Date listed	Date removed	Location	City or town	Description
1	Coffeeville Hotel	Coffeeville Hotel	March 1, 1982 (#82003123)	January 31, 1992	Off MS 330	Coffeeville	Demolished in 1988
2	Leopold Newberger House		November 17, 1997 (#97001300)	August 26, 2004	714 Depot Street	Coffeeville	Disassembled and relocated to Tishomingo County in 2001

== See also ==
- List of National Historic Landmarks in Mississippi
- National Register of Historic Places listings in Mississippi
