= Eldra Buckley =

American football player (born 1985)

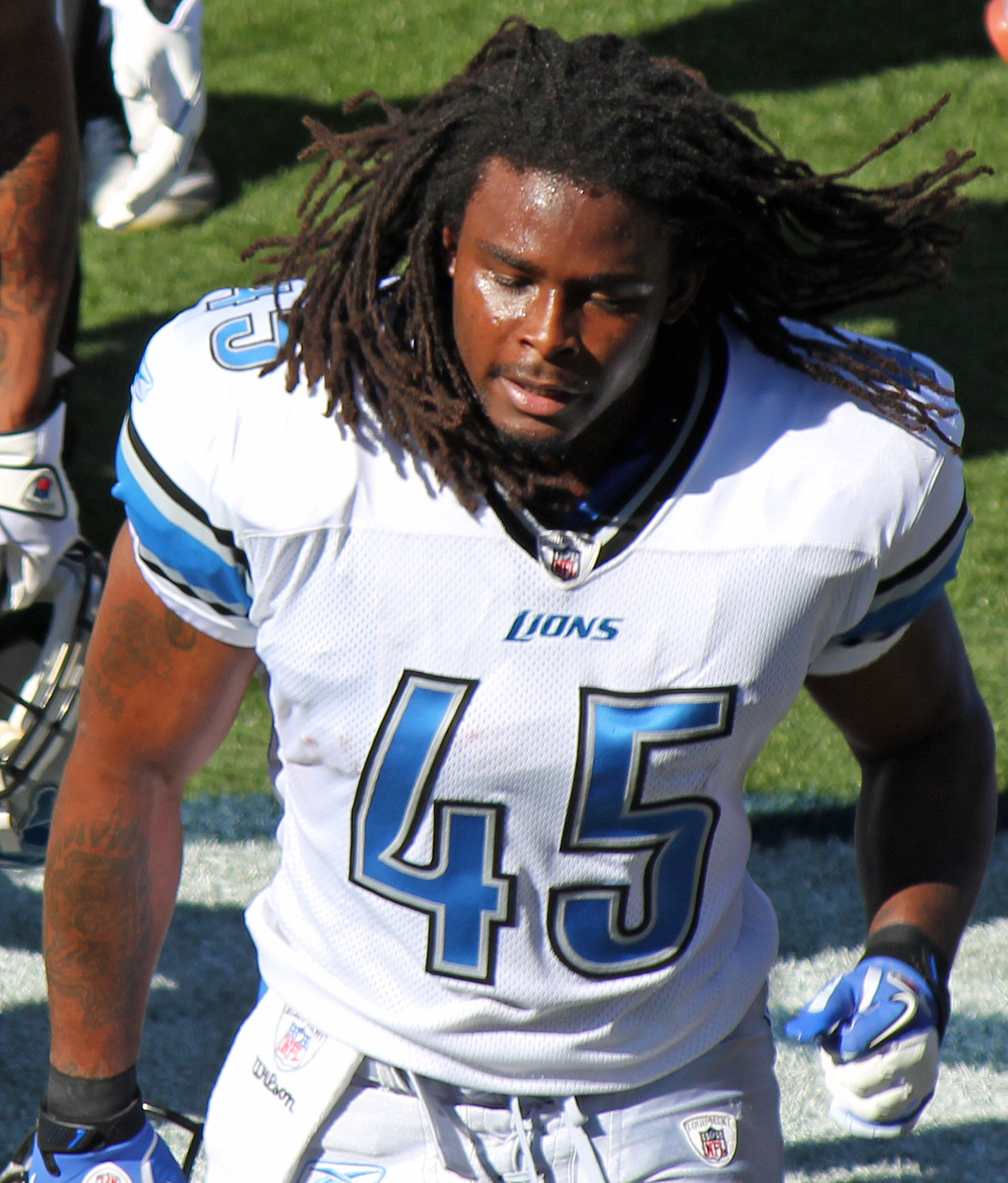
- Buckley during the 2011 NFL season

No. 34, 45
- Position: Running back

Personal information
- Born: June 23, 1985 (age 41); Charleston, Mississippi, U.S.
- Listed height: 5 ft 9 in (1.75 m)
- Listed weight: 202 lb (92 kg)

Career information
- College: Chattanooga
- NFL draft: 2007: undrafted

Career history
- San Diego Chargers (2007–2009)*; Philadelphia Eagles (2009–2010); Detroit Lions (2011)
- * Offseason or practice squad member only

Awards and highlights
- First-team JUCO All-American (2004); 2× First-team All-SoCon (2005–2006)

Career NFL statistics
- Rushing attempts: 36
- Rushing yards: 111
- Rushing touchdowns: 1
- Receptions: 1
- Receiving yards: 10
- Stats at Pro Football Reference

Eldra Clemond Buckley (born June 23, 1985) is former American football running back. He was signed by the San Diego Chargers as an undrafted free agent in 2007, after playing college football at the University of Tennessee at Chattanooga.

Buckley has also played for the Philadelphia Eagles and the Detroit Lions.

== Early life ==
Buckley attended Charleston High School in Charleston, Mississippi and was a letterman in football and track. In football, he was a starter as a running back. In track, as a senior, he placed sixth at the Mississippi Outdoor State Class 3A Meet on the 110 meter high hurdles.

== College career ==
At Northwest Mississippi Community College in Senatobia, Mississippi, Buckley accounted for 1,300 yards and 12 touchdowns on 160 carries for the Rangers in 2004. 140 yards per game on the ground for the Rangers and earned Junior College All-America honors as well as Most Valuable Player of the Mississippi Junior College North Division Ranked No. 23 among junior college players. Buckley finished at Northwest with 160 rushes for 1,300 yards and 12 touchdowns in 2004.

Despite only playing two years for Chattanooga, Buckley is fourth on the Mocs’ all-time rushing list. He totaled 2,437 yards in two seasons and holds the No. 1 and No. 2 marks on UTC's single season rushing list. The 1,204 yards he amassed in his senior year is second only to the 1,233 yards he piled up in his junior campaign.

He became the leader of the offense and was the 2006 recipient of the Woodrow Wolford Sr. Football Scholarship.

== Professional career ==
=== Pre-draft measurables ===
Pre-draft measurables
Height	Weight	40-yard dash	10-yard split	20-yard split	20-yard shuttle	Three-cone drill	Vertical jump	Broad jump	Bench press
5 ft 9 in (1.75 m)	202 lb (92 kg)	4.56 s	2.65 s	1.53 s	4.43 s	7.71 s	35.5 in (0.90 m)	10 ft 0 in (3.05 m)	14 reps
From NFL Combine

Pre-draft measurables
Height	Weight	40-yard dash	10-yard split	20-yard split	Three-cone drill
5 ft 9 in (1.75 m)	202 lb (92 kg)	4.48 s	2.65 s	1.53 s	7.21 s
From Pro Day

=== San Diego Chargers ===
Buckley was not drafted in the 2007 NFL draft, but was signed by the San Diego Chargers as a free agent. He was on the team's practice squad during the 2007 season and 2008 season. He was waived on February 26, 2009.

=== Philadelphia Eagles ===
Buckley was claimed off waivers by the Philadelphia Eagles on March 9, 2009. Due to his performance in the preseason, the Eagles chose to keep him on the roster, cutting Lorenzo Booker instead.

He scored his first touchdown in a game against the Washington Redskins on November 29, 2009.

He was given an exclusive-rights free agent tender and was re-signed to a one-year contract on July 30, 2011. He was released during final roster cuts on September 3.

=== Detroit Lions ===
The Detroit Lions signed Buckley following the placement of Jerome Harrison on the reserve/non-football injury list on October 21, 2011. He was released on November 7 in order to make room for free agent signings.

== Personal life ==
Buckley's father, James, is the mayor of Oakland, Mississippi.

Buckley Is married to his wife Krista Stickles. They have 3 sons: Eldra Buckley Jr, Cameron Buckley, and Riley Buckley.
