= Jim Champion (gridiron football) =

American gridiron football player and coach (1926–1987)

No. 35
- Positions: Linebacker, tackle, defensive tackle

Personal information
- Born: January 11, 1926; Tillatoba, Mississippi, U.S.
- Died: January 15, 1987 (aged 61)
- Listed height: 6 ft 0 in (1.83 m)
- Listed weight: 238 lb (108 kg)

Career information
- High school: Charleston (Charleston, Mississippi)
- College: Mississippi State
- NFL draft: 1950: 18th round, 224th overall pick

Career history

Playing
- New York Yanks (1950–1951)

Coaching
- Greenwood HS (MS) (1954-1956) Head coach; Mississippi St. (1957-1961) Line; BC Lions (1962–1965) Defensive coach; St. Louis Cardinals (1966) Assistant; BC Lions (1967–1969) Head coach; New Orleans Saints (1971–1972) Defensive coordinator; St. Louis Cardinals (1974–1975) Defensive line; New York Jets (1976) Defensive line; Atlanta Falcons (1977–1979) Defensive line; Green Bay Packers (1980) Defensive line

Operations
- St. Louis Cardinals (1973) Scout

Awards and highlights
- Grey Cup champion (52nd)

Career NFL statistics
- Games played: 19
- Games started: 13
- Safeties: 1
- Stats at Pro Football Reference

Head coaching record
- Regular season: CFL: 8–28–2 (.237); High school: 24–4–2 (.833)

James Henry Champion (January 11, 1926 – January 15, 1987) was an American gridiron football player and coach.

A graduate of Mississippi State University, Champion spent two seasons as a linebacker and offensive and defensive tackle for the New York Yanks of the National Football League (NFL).

After his playing career, Champion became head football coach Greenwood High School in Greenwood, Mississippi. After three seasons in Greenwood, he returned to Mississippi State as line coach.

From 1962 to 1965, Champion was a defensive coach with the BC Lions. After spending one season as an assistant with the St. Louis Cardinals, he returned to the Lions, this time as head coach. Champion was fired during the 1969 season after a 1–9 start.

Following his dismissal, Champion served as an assistant with the New Orleans Saints, St. Louis Cardinals, New York Jets, and Atlanta Falcons before his retirement after the 1979 season. He returned to coaching on an interim basis in 1980 after the resignation of Green Bay Packers defensive line coach Fred von Appen. Champion spent the rest of the season with the Packers, but was not brought back for the 1981 season.

== Head coaching record ==
Team	Year	Regular season					Postseason		
Team	Year	Won	Lost	Ties	Win %	Finish	Won	Lost	Result
BC	1967	3	8	1	.273	5th in West Division	0	0	Missed playoffs
BC	1968	4	11	1	.267	4th in West Division	0	0	Missed playoffs
BC	1969	1	9	0	.100	5th in West Division	0	0	Fired
Total		8	28	2	.222		0	0	
