= Meece =

Meece may refer to:

== People ==
- David Meece (born 1952), contemporary Christian musician
- John William Meece (1843–1924), American politician, member of the Mississippi legislature
- Lauren Meece (born 1983), American judoka
- Roger A. Meece (born 1949), American diplomat

== Other ==
- Cold Meece, village near Swynnerton, Staffordshire, UK
  - Cold Meece railway station, railway station serving the Royal Ordnance Factory at Swynnerton during WWII
- Mill Meece Pumping Station, pumping station in the village of Millmeece, Staffordshire, England
- Warden Cyrus Meece, fictional character from the animated series SWAT Kats

== See also ==
- Meese (disambiguation)
