= Hendersonville, Mississippi =

Hendersonville
- Ghost town
- Location within Mississippi
- Coordinates: 33°56′15″N 89°43′43″W
- Country: United States
- State: Mississippi
- County: Yalobusha
- Elevation: 367 ft (112 m)
- Time zone: UTC-6 (Central (CST))
  - Summer (DST): UTC-5 (CDT)
- GNIS feature ID: 705923

Hendersonville is an extinct town located in Yalobusha County, Mississippi.

Once the largest town in Yalobusha County, the former settlement is today covered by forest.

== History ==
John Henderson, a Presbyterian missionary and the town's namesake, settled in the area in 1798.

In 1833, the Mississippi Legislature authorized the formation of 17 counties, including Yalobusha. Yalobusha County's first elected officials, called the "Board of Police", met in 1834 at Hendersonville. A county seat had not yet been selected, and the Board of Police solicited land donations. At the second meeting, a nearby location more centrally located in the county, later named Coffeeville, was selected for the county seat. A local resident, Capt. L. Lake, wrote in 1834: "Hendersonville then went down and ultimately lost its name, being absorbed in a farm known as 'Oakchickamau,'" owned by Franklin E. Plummer.

An early resident of county named Mr. E. Percy Howe, appeared to dislike both Hendersonville and Coffeeville. He left a poem behind after moving away:

Upon a hill near Derden's Mill
There is a place called Coffeeville;
The meanest town I ever saw
Save Plummer's town, 'Oakchickamau.'
