= Meese =

Meese may refer to:

== Geography ==
- Meese (river) Shropshire, England

== People ==
- Edwin Meese (1931) American attorney general
  - Meese Report
- David Meese (1723–1770) Dutch botanist
- Jonathan Meese (1970) German painter, sculptor, performance artist
- Jules Meese (1896–1968) French weightlifter
- Matt Meese (1983) American sketch comedian and actor
- Patrick and Nathan Meese, of Meese (band)
- Reg Meese (1927–2005) was an Australian rules footballer
- Ward Meese (1897–1968) American football player

== Other ==
- Meese (band) rock band from Denver
- Used humorously and incorrectly as a plural for moose

== See also ==
- Meece (disambiguation)
- River Mease, English Midlands
- Mice
