= George E. Denley =

American politician

Member of the Mississippi State Senate from the 28th district
- In office January 1928 – January 1932

Member of the Mississippi House of Representatives from the Yalobusha County district
- In office January 1916 – January 1924

Personal details
- Born: August 9, 1867 Coles Creek, Mississippi
- Died: August 1942 (aged 74–75) Grenada, Mississippi
- Party: Democratic

George Elias Denley (August 9, 1867 – August 1942) was an American farmer, teacher, editor, and Democratic politician who served in the Mississippi House of Representatives from 1916 to 1924 and the Mississippi State Senate from 1928 to 1932.

== Early life ==
George Elias Denley was born on August 9, 1867, in Coles Creek, Mississippi. He was the son of James Denley and Margaret (Sellers) Denley. Denley attended the schools of Yalobusha County.

== Career ==
He taught at school from 1887 to 1889 and from 1896 to 1900. In 1908, he became the editor and printer of the Coffeeville Courier newspaper in Coffeeville, Mississippi. He was also a life insurance agent.

He was a justice of the peace from 1895 to 1899 and a member of the Board of Supervisors of Yalobusha County from 1899 to 1907. In 1915, he was elected to represent Yalobusha County in the Mississippi House of Representatives and served from 1916 to 1920. He was re-elected in 1919 and served from 1920 to 1924. Denley then represented the 28th District in the Mississippi State Senate from 1928 to 1932. Denley died after a long illness in Grenada, Mississippi, in August 1942.

== Personal life ==
Denley married Martha Ellen Williams on January 7, 1892. They had eleven children, named Martha Essey, Margaret (Denley) Speir, Chester Lamar, Mary Jessie, Gladys Ethel, Sellers Vanhoozer, Nellie Tolise, Evelyn Grace, Gerald Hamilton, George Edwin, and Clara Lucile. Their son Sellers served in the Mississippi House of Representatives from 1940 to 1944.
