= Ray Terrell =

American football player (1919–1997)

- Terrell in 1946

Profile
- Positions: Halfback, defensive back

Personal information
- Born: June 29, 1919; Water Valley, Mississippi, U.S.
- Died: February 11, 1997 (aged 77); Gulfport, Mississippi, U.S.
- Listed height: 6 ft 0 in (1.83 m)
- Listed weight: 185 lb (84 kg)

Career information
- High school: Water Valley
- College: Ole Miss
- NFL draft: 1946: undrafted

Career history
- Cleveland Browns (1946); Baltimore Colts (1947); Cleveland Browns (1947)

Awards and highlights
- 2× AAFC champion (1946, 1947)

Career NFL statistics
- Games: 23
- Rushing yards: 165
- Stats at Pro Football Reference

Raymond Willard Terrell (June 29, 1919 – February 11, 1997) was an American professional football player who was a halfback and defensive back for two seasons with the Cleveland Browns and the Baltimore Colts of the All-America Football Conference (AAFC).

Terrell played college football as a halfback for the Ole Miss Rebels. He joined the U.S. military in 1942 during World War II, and upon his discharge was signed by the Browns, then a team under formation in the new AAFC. Terrell returned an interception 76 yards for a touchdown in the Browns' first game, a team record that stood for 14 years. The Browns went on to win the first AAFC championship, but Terrell was sent to the Colts after the season as part of a league-led effort to distribute talent more evenly among its teams. He was released by the Colts midway through the 1947 season, however, and returned to the Browns. The team proceeded to win a second AAFC championship.

== College and professional career ==
Terrell was born in Mississippi and attended the University of Mississippi, where he played as a halfback on the football team. He entered the U.S. Navy in 1942 during World War II and played football for a team at Naval Air Station Jacksonville, where he was stationed. He moved to the U.S. Marine Corps in 1943 and played for another team at Camp Lejune in North Carolina.

Terrell was signed by the Cleveland Browns of the new All-America Football Conference (AAFC) in 1946. He played on offense and defense for the Browns, and in the team's first game against the Miami Seahawks he returned an interception 76 yards for a touchdown, a team record that stood for 14 years. The Browns won the AAFC's first championship game at the end of the season.

Terrell was one of several Browns players sent to the struggling Baltimore Colts after the season in an attempt to balance talent among the AAFC's teams. He was cut by the Colts in the middle of the 1947 season, however, and tried to regain his position on the Browns' roster after several of the team's halfbacks suffered injuries. "We're going to take a good look at him and if we're convinced that Ray has what he had when he was with us last year we will sign him," Cleveland coach Paul Brown said at the time. Terrell was re-signed by the Browns shortly thereafter and played in several games at the end of the season. The Browns won a second AAFC championship in 1947.
