= Arnold Campbell =

American football player (born 1962)

No. 90, 65
- Positions: Defensive end, offensive lineman, defensive tackle

Personal information
- Born: November 13, 1962 (age 63); Charleston, Mississippi, U.S.
- Listed height: 6 ft 3 in (1.91 m)
- Listed weight: 260 lb (118 kg)

Career information
- High school: Charleston
- College: Alcorn State
- NFL draft: 1985: undrafted

Career history
- New Orleans Saints (1985)*; Buffalo Bills (1987); Houston Oilers (1988)*; Ottawa Rough Riders (1989); Detroit Drive (1990); Orlando Predators (1991); Dallas Texans (1991–1992); Arizona Rattlers (1993); Milwaukee Mustangs (1994); Miami Hooters (1994–1995); Milwaukee Mustangs (1995–1997)
- * Offseason or practice squad member only

Awards and highlights
- ArenaBowl champion (1990); AFL All-Star Game (1993)

Career NFL statistics
- Games played: 3
- Stats at Pro Football Reference

Career CFL statistics
- Games played: 2

Career AFL statistics
- Tackles: 93
- Sacks: 20
- Fumble recoveries: 6
- Stats at ArenaFan.com

Arnold Rene Campbell (born November 13, 1962) is an American former professional football player who was a defensive end for one season with the Buffalo Bills of the National Football League (NFL) in 1987. He was a replacement player. He also played in the Arena Football League (AFL) and Canadian Football League (CFL). He played college football for the Alcorn State Braves.

== Early life ==
Arnold Campbell was born on November 13, 1962, in Charleston, Mississippi and attended at Charleston High School.

== College career ==
He went to college at Alcorn State University.

== Professional career ==
=== Buffalo Bills ===
Campbell was a replacement player for the Buffalo Bills. He played three games.

=== Ottawa Rough Riders ===
In 1989, he played two games for the Ottawa Rough Riders. He was a defensive tackle.

=== Detroit Drive ===
In 1990 he played for the Detroit Drive of the Arena Football League. In 12 games he had 12 tackles and one fumble recovery.

=== Orlando Predators ===
In 1991 he played for two teams, the Orlando Predators and the Dallas Texans. With the Predators, he had four tackles in five games. He also had one sack.

=== Dallas Texans ===
His second team of 1991 was the Dallas Texans. With the Texans he had one tackle, he also had a sack in two games.

In 1992 he had 10 tackles in 10 games and two sacks. Campbell also had two forced fumbles and three recoveries.

=== Arizona Rattlers ===
In 1993, Campbell played for the Arizona Rattlers. He had four sacks and 11 tackles. He was in the Arena All-Star game. He played in 11 games.

=== Milwaukee Mustangs (first stint) ===
In 1994, he played for the Milwaukee Mustangs, he played in 10 games and had 15 tackles. He also had three forced fumbles.

=== Miami Hooters ===
He also played two games for the Miami Hooters in 1994 but he did not have any statistics.

He played in four games for the Miami Hooters in 1995. He had seven tackles before going back to the Milwaukee Mustangs. He had a blocked kick in 1995 for the Hooters.

=== Milwaukee Mustangs (second stint) ===
He had a second stint with the Mustangs in 1995; he played seven games and had six tackles and a sack. He also had a blocked kick, his second of the season.

In 1996 he played 14 games, the most of any season of his career. He had 12 tackles and five sacks; Campbell had eight passes defended also.

His final season was in 1997; he played 14 games again and had 15 tackles. He also had a sack and a fumble recovery.
