= Scobey, Mississippi =

- Unincorporated community
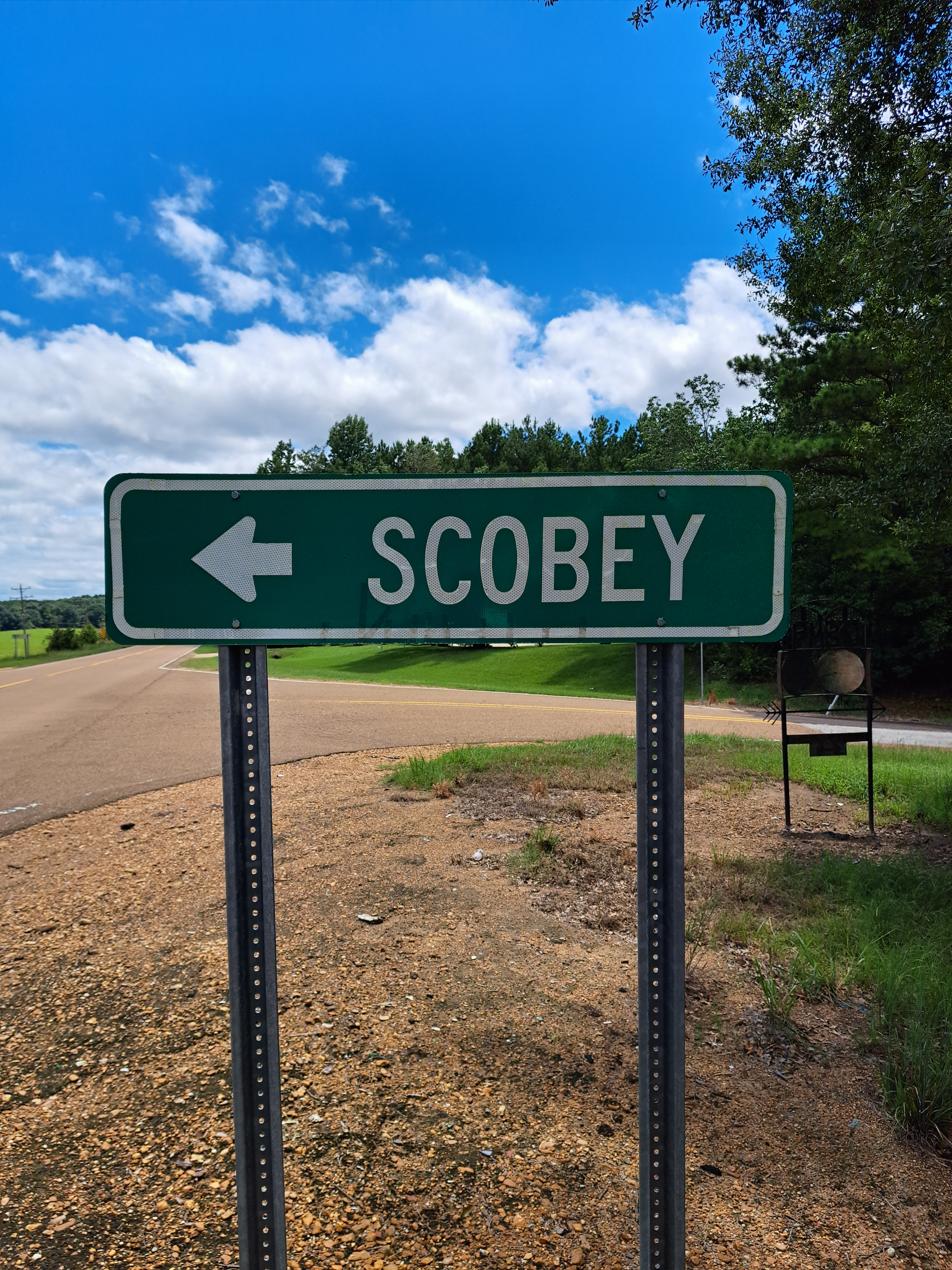

- Location within Mississippi Location within the United States
- Coordinates: 33°56′29″N 89°51′57″W
- Country: United States
- State: Mississippi
- County: Yalobusha
- Elevation: 358 ft (109 m)
- Time zone: UTC-6 (Central (CST))
  - Summer (DST): UTC-5 (CDT)
- ZIP code: 38953
- Area code: 662
- GNIS feature ID: 694727

Scobey is an unincorporated community located in Yalobusha County, Mississippi, United States, approximately 4 miles (6.4 km) southeast of Tillatoba and 13 miles (21 km) north of Grenada.

Although an unincorporated community, Scobey has a post office and a zip code of 38953.
