= Leggo, Mississippi =

- Ghost town
- Location within Mississippi
- Coordinates: 34°06′48″N 89°47′50″W
- Country: United States
- State: Mississippi
- County: Yalobusha
- Elevation: 331 ft (101 m)
- Time zone: UTC-6 (Central (CST))
  - Summer (DST): UTC-5 (CDT)
- GNIS feature ID: 705926

Leggo is a ghost town in Yalobusha County, Mississippi, United States.

The settlement was located about 1 mi (1.6 km) south of Enid Lake, and 10 mi (16 km) west of Water Valley.

Leggo gained fame due to a mineral well located nearby.

== History ==
W.B. Ford moved from South Carolina to Mississippi after the Civil War. Ford dug a well to supply water to his livestock, but his cattle would not drink it due to its high mineral content. The water from "Ford's Well" was believed to have medicinal properties, and the community of Leggo developed a short distance south of the well.

Leggo flourished as a health resort, and many people would visit Leggo annually to use Ford's water. Ford also sold his water throughout the southeastern United States.

Leggo had a school, a post office, and a hotel.

Leggo today is covered by forest. The Ford's Well Church and Cemetery are located north of the former settlement.
