= A. M. Secrest =

American publisher, editor, and civil rights advocate

Andrew McDowd Secrest
- Born: September 15, 1923; Monroe, North Carolina
- Died: April 17, 2010 (aged 86); Chapel Hill, North Carolina
- Occupation: Journalist
- Spouse: Ann Louise Eastman

Andrew McDowd "Mac" Secrest Jr. (September 15, 1923 – April 17, 2010), known professionally as A. M. Secrest, was an American newspaper publisher, editor, and civil rights advocate. He served as a federal mediator for the Community Relations Service under President Lyndon B. Johnson.

== Early life and education ==
Secrest was born on September 15, 1923, in Monroe, North Carolina. He attended Duke University, where he earned a B.A. in 1944, a Master's degree in 1970, and a PhD in 1972.

== Journalism ==
After serving as an officer aboard the USS Hammann (DE-131) during World War II, Secrest worked for several newspapers including The Laurinburg Exchange and The Charlotte News. In 1953, he became the owner and publisher of The Cheraw Chronicle, a weekly paper in northeastern South Carolina. His editorials opposing segregation and advocating for civil rights drew criticism and harassment, but also support. During his tenure, the paper sustained its circulation and advertising revenue, and Secrest garnered local and national accolades for his journalism.

== Contribution to civil rights ==
In 1959, Secrest was appointed to South Carolina's State Advisory Committee of the U.S. Commission on Civil Rights. During this period, Secrest joined the board of directors of Penn Community Services, Inc. (now Penn Center), where Martin Luther King Jr. and Southern Christian Leadership Conference members planned the March on Washington and the Poor People's Campaign.

In June 1964, Secrest was appointed to the newly established Community Relations Service as a field conciliator, a role that sent him to different communities in the U.S. to help mediate racial disputes. The behind-the-scenes work of the Community Relations Service under director LeRoy Collins is credited with helping deescalate tensions in Selma, Alabama, following the events of Sunday, March 7, 1965, when state troopers and possemen attacked unarmed civil rights demonstrators. Hoping to avoid a repeat of "Bloody Sunday", President Johnson dispatched Collins and Secrest to Selma to meet with King about plans to resume the Selma-to-Montgomery march. A compromise was negotiated: on March 9, King would lead demonstrators across the Edmund Pettus Bridge, hold a prayer meeting at the site of the Bloody Sunday violence, then turn the march back to Selma. Collins and Secrest secured assurances from Alabama officials that they would not attack demonstrators this time.

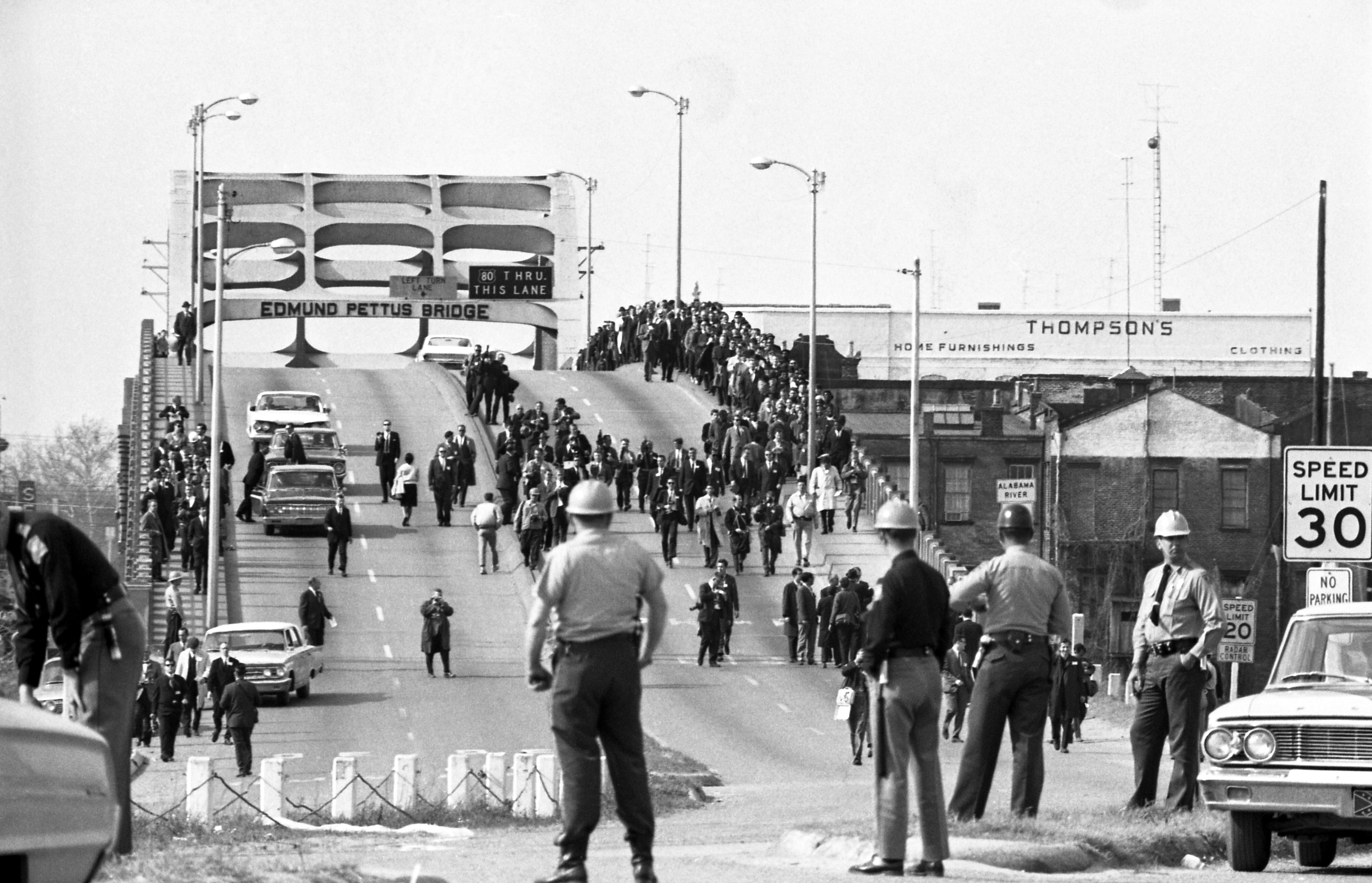
Civil rights demonstrators crossing the Edmund Pettus Bridge from Selma to Montgomery on March 7, 1965

== Teaching career and retirement ==
After selling The Cheraw Chronicle in 1968, Secrest taught journalism at the University of North Carolina at Chapel Hill for five years. From 1976 until he retired in 1985, he taught at North Carolina Central University, a historically black college in Durham. In 2004, Secrest published a memoir, Curses and Blessings: Life and Evolution in the 20th Century South, which includes stories of his encounters with King, John F. Kennedy, Dizzy Gillespie, Richard Nixon, Strom Thurmond, and other notable figures of the time.

== Marriage and children ==
Secrest married Ann Louise Eastman, of Concord, New Hampshire, in 1948. They had three children: David Kilton, Andrew Phillips, and Mary Ann.

== Death ==
In 2010, Secrest died in Chapel Hill, North Carolina, after complications from surgery for throat cancer.

== Honors and awards ==
Secrest received honors for his journalism and contributions to civil rights. In 1957, he won the National Editorial Association's Herrick Editorial Award "for the most significant contribution to the extension and strengthening of democracy and individual liberties." He was awarded the Sidney Hillman Foundation's Hillman Prize in 1958. In 1960, he received a Nieman Fellowship, enabling him to study at Harvard University for a year. As a journalism graduate student at Duke University, Secrest was named a Halstead Fellow in 1969 and received a Woodrow Wilson Dissertation Fellowship in 1970.

In 2007, Secrest was inducted into the North Carolina Journalism Hall of Fame in Chapel Hill.
