= Water Valley High School (Mississippi) =

Public school in Mississippi, United States

Location
- 550 Markette St; Water Valley, MS 38965; United States
- 34.1574°N 89.6414°W

Information
- School type: Comprehensive Public High School
- Status: Operating
- School district: Water Valley School District
- Teaching staff: 35.02 (FTE)
- Grades: 7–12
- Gender: Coeducational
- Enrollment: 436 (2022–2023)
- Student to teacher ratio: 12.45
- Campus type: Suburban
- Colors: Royal blue and white
- Mascot: Blue Devils
- Website: web site

Water Valley High School is a high school in Water Valley, Mississippi.

Mississippi's only environmental and spatial technology lab is located at Water Valley High School.

== Curriculum ==
Water Valley High School offers traditional academic courses, including Advanced Placement in English.

Vocational and technical programs are offered in agriculture, building trades, cooperative education, and food services.

== Extracurricular activities ==
Extracurricular activities include band, baseball, basketball, cheerleading, football, softball, and track.

The school has a very strong Chess Club and scored 12 points out of 20 to finish fifth in the state at the 2017 Mississippi K–12 Team Championship. The Chess Club also hosts two tournaments a year for the Mississippi Scholastic Chess Association which are rated by the United States Chess Federation.

== Notable alumni ==
- Kevin Horan, member of the Mississippi House of Representatives
- Bryant Mix, professional football player
