= Deantre Prince =

American football player (born 2000)

Profile
- Position: Cornerback

Personal information
- Born: October 12, 2000 (age 26); Charleston, Mississippi, U.S.
- Listed height: 6 ft 0 in (1.83 m)
- Listed weight: 184 lb (83 kg)

Career information
- High school: Charleston
- College: Ole Miss (2019); Northeast Mississippi CC (2020); Ole Miss (2021–2023)
- NFL draft: 2024: 5th round, 153rd overall pick

Career history
- Jacksonville Jaguars (2024); Louisville Kings (2026); Chicago Bears (2026)*
- * Offseason or practice squad member only

Career NFL statistics as of 2025
- Total tackles: 8
- Pass deflections: 1
- Stats at Pro Football Reference

Deantre Antoine Prince (born October 12, 2000) is an American professional football cornerback. He played college football for the Ole Miss Rebels and Northeast Mississippi Tigers and was selected by the Jacksonville Jaguars in the fifth round of the 2024 NFL draft.

== Early life ==
Prince was born on October 12, 2000, in Charleston, Mississippi. He attended Charleston High School and played three sports while being a four-year varsity football player. He played multiple positions, including quarterback, running back, wide receiver, cornerback, safety, and return specialist, ending his high school career having scored a touchdown in six different ways while having helped Charleston to the 2018 district championship. A four-star recruit, he committed to play college football for the Ole Miss Rebels.

== College career ==
As a true freshman at Ole Miss in 2019, Prince appeared in all 12 games, three as a starter, and totaled 25 tackles along with two interceptions. He said that he felt "immature" in his first year at Ole Miss, and he thus transferred in 2020 to Northeast Mississippi Community College. In the 2020 season at Northeast Mississippi, Prince tallied 25 tackles and was named all-conference and an NJCAA All-American.

Prince transferred back to Ole Miss in 2021 and made the team as a walk-on. That season, he started seven games and posted 46 tackles along with two interceptions. He recorded 39 tackles, an interception, and a team-leading 11 pass breakups as a senior in 2022, while starting all 13 games. Being granted an extra year of eligibility due to the COVID-19 pandemic, Prince opted to return for a final season in 2023. He had 36 tackles, six pass deflections and an interception in his final year. He finished his Ole Miss career with 146 tackles, 27 pass breakups and six interceptions. He was invited to the East–West Shrine Bowl and participated at the NFL Scouting Combine.

== Professional career ==
Pre-draft measurables
Height	Weight	Arm length	Hand span	Wingspan	40-yard dash	10-yard split	20-yard split	Three-cone drill	Vertical jump	Broad jump	Bench press
6 ft 0 in (1.83 m)	183 lb (83 kg)	30 3/4 in (0.78 m)	8 1/2 in (0.22 m)	6 ft 1 3/4 in (1.87 m)	4.38 s	1.47 s	2.58 s	7.49 s	37.5 in (0.95 m)	10 ft 5 in (3.18 m)	12 reps
All values from NFL Combine/Pro Day

=== Jacksonville Jaguars ===
Prince was selected in the fifth round (153rd overall) of the 2024 NFL draft by the Jacksonville Jaguars.

On August 26, 2025, Prince was waived by the Jaguars as part of final roster cuts.

=== Louisville Kings ===
On January 14, 2026, Prince was selected by the Louisville Kings of the United Football League (UFL). He was released on May 5.

=== Chicago Bears ===
On August 17, 2026, Prince signed with the Chicago Bears. Prince was waived by the Bears as a part of final roster cuts on August 30; he was re-signed to the team's practice squad the following day. He was released on October 6.
