= Bryant Mix =

American football player (born 1972)

No. 97
- Position: Defensive end

Personal information
- Born: July 28, 1972 (age 54); Water Valley, Mississippi, U.S.
- Listed height: 6 ft 3 in (1.91 m)
- Listed weight: 291 lb (132 kg)

Career information
- High school: Water Valley
- College: Northwest Mississippi CC (1992–1993); Alcorn State (1994–1995)
- NFL draft: 1996: 2nd round, 38th overall pick

Career history
- Houston/Tennessee Oilers (1996–1997); Tampa Bay Buccaneers (1998)

Career NFL statistics
- Tackles: 8
- Sacks: 1
- Stats at Pro Football Reference

Bryant Lee Mix (born July 28, 1972) is an American former professional football player who was a defensive end for two seasons with the Houston/Tennessee Oilers of the National Football League (NFL). He was selected by the Oilers in the second round of the 1996 NFL draft. He played college football at Northwest Mississippi Community College and Alcorn State University.

== Early life ==
Bryant Lee Mix was born on July 28, 1972, in Water Valley, Mississippi. He attended Water Valley High School, where he lettered in football, baseball, basketball, and track. He helped Water Valley win the 1990 Class 3A State championship in football.

== College career ==
Mix first played college football at Northwest Mississippi Community College from 1992 to 1993. He was named an honorable mention All-American by JC Gridwire and the NJCAA. Mix then transferred to play for the Alcorn State Braves of Alcorn State University, where he was a two-year letterman and earned All-Southwestern Athletic Conference honors both seasons. He also garnered Black College All-American recognition while at Alcorn State and set school records for most sacks in a game and most sacks in a season. Mix was inducted into Northwest Mississippi Community College's "Northwest Sports Hall of Fame" in 2008.

== Professional career ==
Mix was selected by the Houston Oilers in the second round, with the 38th overall pick, of the 1996 NFL draft. He officially signed with the team on July 20. He played in six games, starting two, for the Oilers during his rookie year in 1996, recording six solo tackles, two assisted tackles, and one sack. He appeared in one game for the newly-renamed Tennessee Oilers in 1997 but did not record any statistics. Mix was released by the Oilers on August 30, 1998.

Mix signed with the Tampa Bay Buccaneers on October 27, 1998, but did not appear in any games for the team during the 1998 season. He was released by the Buccaneers on August 29, 1999.

== Coaching career ==
In 2001, Mix returned to his alma mater Water Valley High School as an assistant football coach. He helped the football team win the state title in 2018. He has also spent time coaching track at Water Valley High.
