= Allen Carver High School =

Location
- 17 Oak Grove Road; Charleston, Mississippi; United States
- Coordinates: 34.0095577°N 90.054228°W

Information
- Former name: Tallahatchie Agricultural High School; Tallahatchie Agricultural Training High School
- Type: Public

Allen Carver High School was a public secondary school in Charleston, Mississippi, United States. It served as the high school for black students until the public schools were integrated in 1971.

== History ==
Tallahatchie Agricultural High School was opened in 1917 for the purpose of educating the negro students of East Tallahatchie County. The interior of the buildings was plastered and finished with red gum, and each room had steam heat, electric lights, and running water. Boarding at the school was provided at cost, with a maximum of $8.00 per month. In addition, students paid the cost of books and a $5.00 matriculation fee. During the depression the school was closed due to lack of funds.

In 1970, the federal courts mandated integration of the schools. The school district of East Tallahatchie County attempted to satisfy this requirement by busing entire classes of white children, along with their teachers, from East Tallahatchie to Allen Carver, while transporting a similar number of black students from Allen Carver to Tallahatchie. This allowed the district to maintain completely segregated classrooms but claim that integration had been achieved. Black students protested, so the Tallahatchie County sheriff arrested 125 black students On October 19. The students were incarcerated at the state penitentiary at Parchman, but on October 21, most were released. A Federal judge ordered the school board to meet with the students. While a meeting took place, the school board refused to act on the students grievances, and ridiculed the student representatives. The Community Relations Service (CRS) met with both parties, and in November reached an agreement which allowed the 125 students to return to school, new elections for student council, cheerleaders, and the school's mascot were held. In addition, the classrooms and cafeteria were integrated. The next year high school students attended East Tallahatchie High School and the Allen Carver buildings became Charleston Middle School.
