= Water Valley School District =

School district in Mississippi

Address
- 544 Markette Street Water Valley, Yalobusha County, Mississippi; United States

District information
- Grades: PreK–12
- Superintendent: Drew Pitcock
- Asst. superintendent(s): Sharron Lipsey
- Schools: 2
- NCES District ID: 2804500

Students and staff
- Students: 1,024
- Teachers: 76.06
- Student–teacher ratio: 13.46 FTE

Other information
- Website: www.wvsdonline.com

The Water Valley School District is a public school district based in Water Valley, Mississippi (USA).

In addition to Water Valley, the district also serves rural areas in northeastern Yalobusha County.

== Schools ==
- Water Valley High School (Grades 7-12)
- Water Valley Elementary School (a.k.a. Davidson Elementary) (Grades K-6)

== Demographics ==
=== 2006-07 school year ===
There were a total of 1,331 students enrolled in the Water Valley School District during the 2006–2007 school year. The gender makeup of the district was 49% female and 51% male. The racial makeup of the district was 45.83% African American, 53.49% White, and 0.68% Hispanic. 56.2% of the district's students were eligible to receive free lunch.

=== Previous school years ===
School Year	Enrollment	Gender Makeup		Racial Makeup				
School Year	Enrollment	Female	Male	Asian	African American	Hispanic	Native American	White
2005-06	1,352	47%	53%	0.07%	46.30%	0.15%	–	53.48%
2004-05	1,325	47%	53%	–	46.42%	0.15%	–	53.43%
2003-04	1,308	48%	52%	–	47.32%	0.23%	–	52.45%
2002-03	1,316	49%	51%	–	47.72%	0.23%	–	52.05%

== Accountability statistics ==
	2006-07	2005-06	2004-05	2003-04	2002-03
District Accreditation Status	Accredited	Accredited	Accredited	Accredited	Accredited
School Performance Classifications
Level 5 (Superior Performing) Schools	2	2	2	0	0
Level 4 (Exemplary) Schools	0	0	0	2	2
Level 3 (Successful) Schools	0	0	0	0	0
Level 2 (Under Performing) Schools	0	0	0	0	0
Level 1 (Low Performing) Schools	0	0	0	0	0
Not Assigned	0	0	0	0	0

== See also ==
- List of school districts in Mississippi
