= Linda Whittington =

American politician

Member of the Mississippi House of Representatives from the 34th district
- In office 2008–2016
- Succeeded by: Kevin Horan

Personal details
- Born: November 23, 1950 (age 75) Charleston, Mississippi, United States
- Party: Democratic

Linda Whittington (born November 23, 1950) is an American politician who served as a member of the Mississippi House of Representatives for the 34th district from 2008 to 2016. She is a member of the Democratic party.
