= Robert Huddleston =

American politician (born 1955)

Member of the Mississippi House of Representatives from the 30th district
- In office 1996–2018
- Succeeded by: Tracey Rosebud

Personal details
- Born: February 22, 1955 (age 71) Sumner, Mississippi, United States
- Party: Democratic

Robert E. Huddleston (born February 22, 1955) is an American politician. He is a former member of the Mississippi House of Representatives from the 30th District, being first elected in 1995. He is a member of the Democratic party. Huddleston resigned in 2018 and was succeeded by Tracey Rosebud, who won the May 29, 2018 special election runoff for House District 30.
