= For One Night =

2006 made-for-television drama film directed by Ernest Dickerson

- Promotional image
- Written by: Denetria Harris-Lawrence
- Directed by: Ernest Dickerson
- Starring: Raven-Symoné; Aisha Tyler; Jason Lewis; Sam Jones III; Daina Gozan
- Music by: Patrice Rushen
- Country of origin: United States
- Original language: English

Production
- Editor: Stephen Lovejoy

Original release
- Release: February 6, 2006

For One Night is a 2006 American made-for-TV drama film directed by Ernest Dickerson, written by Denetria Harris-Lawrence, and starring Raven-Symoné as Brianna McCallister and Aisha Tyler as Desiree Howard. The film's premise is based on the true story of Gerica McCrary, who made headlines in 2002 by getting Taylor County High School in her hometown of Butler, Georgia, to integrate the prom after thirty-one years of segregation.

== Plot ==
Inspired by the true story of an African American teenager who shook up a small town where high school proms had been racially segregated for decades. Amid the protests of the community and with the help of a newspaper reporter who returns to her hometown to cover the story, the two women are able to reverse decades of racist tradition and make history, at least for one night.

== Cast ==
- Raven-Symone as Brianna McCallister
- Aisha Tyler as Desiree Howard
- Sam Jones III as Brandon Williams
- Gary Grubbs as Mr. Thornton
- William Ragsdale as Earl Randall
- Jason Lewis as Mark Manning
- Harold Sylvester as Mr. Howard
- Donna Duplantier as Aunt Marlene
- Joan Pringle as Mrs. Edna Howard
- Rhoda Griffis as Ginny Stephens
- Daina Gozan as Sela Moody
- Mills Allison as Ely Hardy
- Carolina Jahna as Carla Thornton
- James Aaron Smith as Myron Dawson (credited as James Aaron)
- Louis Herthum as Sheriff Taylor
- Katie Seeley as Kelly Reynolds (credited as Katie Seely)
- Azure Parsons as Lily Dubois (credited as Azure Dawn)
- Adam Powell as Paul Beaudine
- Mary Beth Kratky as Shannon Williams
- Yvette Ganier as Juanita Dawson
- Larry Gamell Jr. as Daryl Dawson (credited as Lawrence C. Gamell Jr.)
- Mark Krasnoff as Ronald Macon
- Andrea Ragsdale as Phyllis March
- Harold Evans as Reverend Warren Richards
- Adella Gautier as Mildred Lyttle
- Brandi Gerard as Sally (credited as Brandi Coleman)
- Chris Richardson as J.C. (credited as Christopher Brian Richardson)
- Gary Desroche as Mr. Teppa (uncredited)
- Lauren E. Michon as Heather #2 (uncredited)

== Production ==
For One Night is based on events that occurred in Taylor County, Georgia in 2002. It was filmed in the summer of 2005 in Jefferson, Louisiana shortly before Hurricane Katrina.

=== Cast ===
- Raven-Symoné as Brianna McCallister
- Aisha Tyler as Desiree Howard
- Jason Lewis as Mark Manning
- Sam Jones III as Brandon Williams
- Gary Grubbs as Mr. Thornton
- William Ragsdale as Earl Randall
- Harold Sylvester as Mr Howard, Desiree's dad
- Donna DuPlantier as Aunt Marlene
- Joan Pringle
- Rhoda Griffis as Ginny Stephens
- Daina Gozan as Sela Moody
- Mills Allison as Ely Hardy
- Caroline Jahna as Carla Thornton
- James Aaron as Myron Dawson
- Louis Herthum as Sheriff Taylor
- Katie Seeley as Kelly Reynolds
- Azure Dawn as Lily Dubois
- Adam Powell as Paul Beaudine
- Chuck Halley as Newspaper Editor

=== Soundtrack ===
The end of the movie (prom scene) features Raven-Symoné's song "Gravity".

== Awards ==
- 2007 - Nominated; Image Award for Outstanding Actress in a Television Movie, Mini-Series or Dramatic Special (Aisha Tyler)

== Releases ==
- The film was released on iTunes. On July 31, 2012, the film was released in a package of 4 Lifetime movies on DVD titled 'Surviving High School'. In September 2012 it got its own DVD release through A&E Entertainment.

== See also ==
- Segregated prom
