= Coffeeville School District =

School district in Mississippi, United States

The Coffeeville School District is a public school district based in Coffeeville, Mississippi (USA).

In addition to Coffeeville, the district also serves the towns of Oakland and Tillatoba as well as most of rural Yalobusha County.

== Schools ==
- Coffeeville High School
- Coffeeville Elementary School

== Demographics ==
=== 2006-07 school year ===
There were a total of 640 students enrolled in the Coffeeville School District during the 2006–2007 school year. The gender makeup of the district was 50% female and 50% male. The racial makeup of the district was 83.59% African American and 16.41% White. 84.1% of the district's students were eligible to receive free lunch.

=== Previous school years ===
School Year	Enrollment	Gender Makeup		Racial Makeup				
School Year	Enrollment	Female	Male	Asian	African American	Hispanic	Native American	White
2005-06	679	50%	50%	–	83.80%	0.15%	–	16.05%
2004-05	693	52%	48%	–	84.99%	–	–	15.01%
2003-04	695	51%	49%	–	85.04%	–	–	14.96%
2002-03	744	53%	47%	–	82.53%	–	–	17.47%

== Accountability statistics ==
	2006-07	2005-06	2004-05	2003-04	2002-03
District Accreditation Status	Accredited	Accredited	Accredited	Accredited	Accredited
School Performance Classifications
Level 5 (Superior Performing) Schools	0	0	0	0	0
Level 4 (Exemplary) Schools	0	0	0	0	0
Level 3 (Successful) Schools	2	1	2	2	2
Level 2 (Under Performing) Schools	0	1	0	0	0
Level 1 (Low Performing) Schools	0	0	0	0	0
Not Assigned	0	0	0	0	0

== See also ==
- List of school districts in Mississippi
