= Tracey Rosebud =

American politician

Member of the Mississippi House of Representatives from the 30th district
- Incumbent
- Assumed office June 11, 2018
- Preceded by: Robert Huddleston

Personal details
- Born: February 27, 1976 (age 50) Charleston, Mississippi, U.S.
- Party: Democratic
- Education: Mississippi Delta Community College

Tracey T. Rosebud (born February 27, 1976) is an American politician serving as a member of the Mississippi House of Representatives from the 30th district. He assumed office on June 11, 2018.

== Early life and education ==
Rosebud was born in Charleston, Mississippi. He completed technical training in radiologic technology and science at Mississippi Delta Community College.

== Career ==
Rosebud worked as a project development manager for Metro Consulting Associates and founded Xtrinsic Solutions. He was elected to the Mississippi House of Representatives in a June 11, 2018 special election. During his tenure in the House, Rosebud has served as the vice chair of the Interstate Cooperation Committee.
