= Charleston, Mississippi =

- City
- Tallahatchie Counthouse Charleston

- Location of Charleston, Mississippi

- Location in the United States
- Coordinates: 34°00′15″N 90°03′19″W
- Country: United States
- State: Mississippi
- County: Tallahatchie

Area
  - Total: 1.36 sq mi (3.52 km^{2})
  - Land: 1.36 sq mi (3.51 km^{2})
  - Water: 0.0039 sq mi (0.01 km^{2})
- Elevation: 213 ft (65 m)

Population (2020)
  - Total: 1,884
  - Density: 1,390.3/sq mi (536.81/km^{2})
- Time zone: UTC-6 (Central (CST))
  - Summer (DST): UTC-5 (CDT)
- ZIP codes: 38921, 38958
- Area code: 662
- FIPS code: 28-12900
- GNIS feature ID: 2404031

Charleston is a city in north central Mississippi and one of the two county seats of Tallahatchie County, which is located on both sides of the Tallahatchie River. This city is located east of the river and, as of the 2020 census, had a population of 1,884.

== History ==
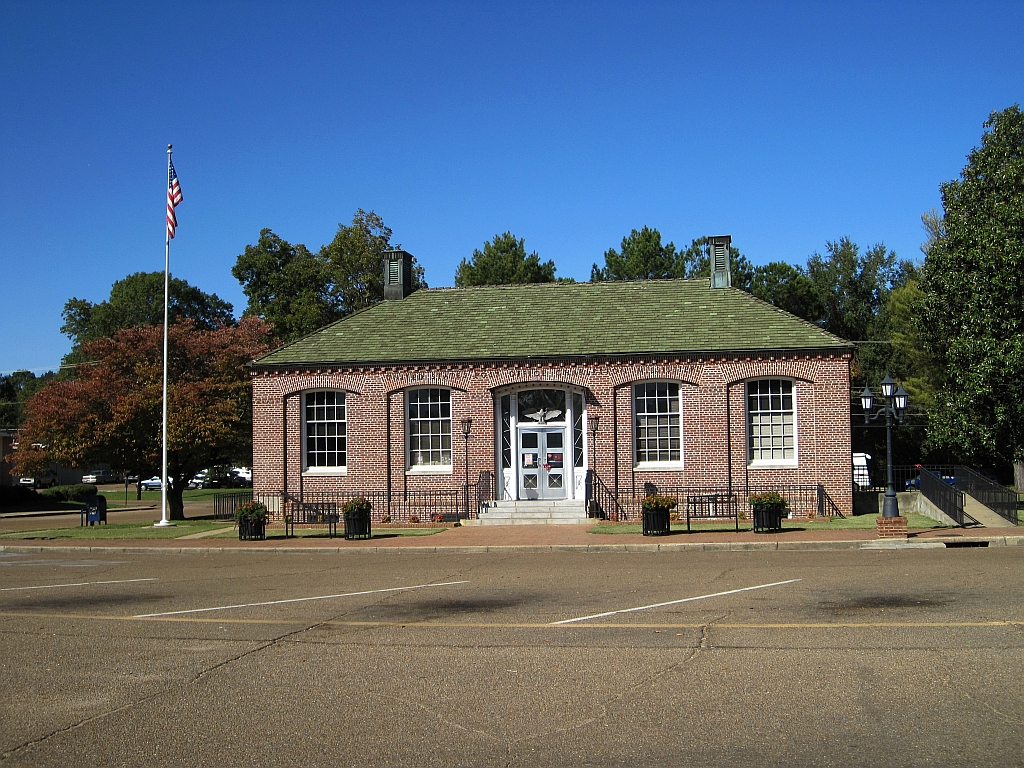
Charleston Post Office

The original county seat, Old Tillatoba, was discovered to have a defective land title, so the seat was removed to Charleston in 1837.

The Charleston Female school, established in 1852, flourished for several years. The Tallahatchie Herald, a Democratic weekly newspaper, was established in 1892. In 1901, the Charleston Bank was established. By the early 1900s, Charleston had a brick courthouse and jail, three churches, schools, a Masonic hall, an Odd Fellows lodge, and two cotton gins. Its leading agricultural staple was cotton. The population in 1906 was 800.

In 1931, a magnitude 4.6 earthquake occurred in Charleston, the most powerful earthquake recorded in Mississippi.

== Geography ==
According to the United States Census Bureau, the city has a total area of 1.4 square miles (3.6 km^{2}), of which 1.4 square miles (3.6 km^{2}) is land and 0.73% is water. It is also situated on the northern end of the concurrency of Mississippi Highways 32 and 35.

The city's official nickname is "Gateway to the Delta".

== Demographics ==
Historical population
Census	Pop.	Note	%±
1880	368		—
1890	412		12.0%
1900	480		16.5%
1910	1,834		282.1%
1920	3,007		64.0%
1930	2,014		−33.0%
1940	2,100		4.3%
1950	2,629		25.2%
1960	2,528		−3.8%
1970	2,821		11.6%
1980	2,878		2.0%
1990	2,328		−19.1%
2000	2,198		−5.6%
2010	2,193		−0.2%
2020	1,884		−14.1%
U.S. Decennial Census

=== Racial and ethnic composition ===
Charleston city, Mississippi – Racial and ethnic composition Note: the US Census treats Hispanic/Latino as an ethnic category. This table excludes Latinos from the racial categories and assigns them to a separate category. Hispanics/Latinos may be of any race.
Race / Ethnicity (NH = Non-Hispanic)	Pop 2000	Pop 2010	Pop 2020	% 2000	% 2010	% 2020
White alone (NH)	852	575	425	38.76%	26.22%	22.56%
Black or African American alone (NH)	1,299	1,593	1,413	59.10%	72.64%	75.00%
Native American or Alaska Native alone (NH)	0	2	0	0.00%	0.09%	0.00%
Asian alone (NH)	7	7	4	0.32%	0.32%	0.21%
Native Hawaiian or Pacific Islander alone (NH)	0	0	0	0.00%	0.00%	0.00%
Other race alone (NH)	0	0	0	0.00%	0.00%	0.00%
Mixed race or Multiracial (NH)	6	10	26	0.27%	0.46%	1.38%
Hispanic or Latino (any race)	34	6	16	1.55%	0.27%	0.85%
Total	2,198	2,193	1,884	100.00%	100.00%	100.00%

=== 2020 census ===
As of the 2020 census, Charleston had a population of 1,884. The median age was 39.5 years. 27.4% of residents were under the age of 18 and 19.7% of residents were 65 years of age or older. For every 100 females there were 78.7 males, and for every 100 females age 18 and over there were 73.2 males age 18 and over.

0.0% of residents lived in urban areas, while 100.0% lived in rural areas.

There were 702 households in Charleston, of which 35.5% had children under the age of 18 living in them. Of all households, 25.9% were married-couple households, 19.1% were households with a male householder and no spouse or partner present, and 48.4% were households with a female householder and no spouse or partner present. About 32.2% of all households were made up of individuals and 13.3% had someone living alone who was 65 years of age or older.

There were 845 housing units, of which 16.9% were vacant. The homeowner vacancy rate was 0.7% and the rental vacancy rate was 16.3%.

Racial composition as of the 2020 census
Race	Number	Percent
White	426	22.6%
Black or African American	1,421	75.4%
American Indian and Alaska Native	4	0.2%
Asian	4	0.2%
Native Hawaiian and Other Pacific Islander	0	0.0%
Some other race	0	0.0%
Two or more races	29	1.5%

=== 2000 census ===
As of the census of 2000, there were 2,198 people, 848 households, and 569 families residing in the city. The population density was 1,612.7 inhabitants per square mile (622.7/km^{2}). There were 933 housing units at an average density of 684.6 per square mile (264.3/km^{2}). The racial makeup of the city was 39.26% White, 59.69% African American, 0.36% Asian, 0.05% from other races, and 0.64% from two or more races. Hispanic or Latino of any race were 1.55% of the population.

There were 848 households, out of which 29.5% had children under the age of 18 living with them, 33.5% were married couples living together, 28.4% had a female householder with no husband present, and 32.8% were non-families. 31.0% of all households were made up of individuals, and 15.8% had someone living alone who was 65 years of age or older. The average household size was 2.51 and the average family size was 3.14.

In the city, the population was spread out, with 27.4% under the age of 18, 9.1% from 18 to 24, 25.2% from 25 to 44, 20.1% from 45 to 64, and 18.2% who were 65 years of age or older. The median age was 36 years. For every 100 females, there were 79.3 males. For every 100 females age 18 and over, there were 72.4 males.

The median income for a household in the city was $18,208, and the median income for a family was $24,750. Males had a median income of $26,500 versus $16,406 for females. The per capita income for the city was $10,835. About 30.7% of families and 34.4% of the population were below the poverty line, including 49.4% of those under age 18 and 29.1% of those age 65 or over.

== Education ==
The City of Charleston is served by the East Tallahatchie School District. Before 1970, a dual system of schools, one for black students and another for whites was maintained. In 1970, the federal courts mandated in Alexander v. Holmes County Board of Education that the schools be integrated, and the school district adopted a plan by which classrooms remained segregated, but during the course of the school day entire classes of children and teachers were bused between East Tallahatchie High School and Allen Carver High School. The black students of Allen Carver protested, and the sheriff arrested 125 of them and sent them to the state penitentiary at Parchman. After intervention by the federal Community Relations Service, the students were allowed to reenter school and makeup missed exams. The classrooms were integrated, new elections were held for student government, and some black cheerleaders were added.

Charleston High School held its first racially integrated prom in April 2008. This event was the subject of the 2008 HBO documentary Prom Night in Mississippi. The documentary focused on Charleston High School and the efforts to have a mixed prom instead of the traditional racially segregated proms.

Strider Academy, near the city, closed in 2018.

Coahoma Community College is the designated community college.

== Notable people ==
- Mose Allison, blues singer and pianist
- James A. Blount, former member of the Mississippi Senate and Mississippi House of Representatives
- Eldra Buckley, former running back for the NFL's Detroit Lions
- Arnold Campbell, former professional football player
- Jess H. Dickinson, associate justice of the Supreme Court of Mississippi from 2004 to 2017
- Brad Dye, former lieutenant governor of Mississippi
- Morgan Freeman, Academy Award-winning actor currently resides in Charleston
- Jazz Gillum, Chicago blues harmonica player and singer
- Al Jones, former relief pitcher for the Chicago White Sox
- Deantre Prince, cornerback for the NFL's Jacksonville Jaguars
- Thomas Reynolds II, member of the Mississippi House of Representatives from 1980 to 2024
- Tracey Rosebud, member of the Mississippi House of Representatives
- Jamie Whitten, congressman.
- Linda Whittington, member of the Mississippi House of Representatives from 2008 to 2016
