= Kevin Horan =

American politician (born 1961)

Member of the Mississippi House of Representatives
- Incumbent
- Assumed office 2016
- Preceded by: Linda Whittington
- Constituency: 34th district
- In office 2012–2016
- Preceded by: Sid Bondurant
- Constituency: 24th district

Personal details
- Born: October 29, 1961 (age 64) Water Valley, Mississippi, U.S.
- Party: Republican
- Other political affiliations: Democratic (before 2020); Independent (2020)
- Spouse: Clarissa
- Education: University of Mississippi (BBA); Mississippi College (JD)

Kevin Horan (born October 29, 1961) is an American attorney and politician serving as a member of the Mississippi House of Representatives from the 34th district. He assumed office in January 2012. Horan previously represented the 24th district from 2012 to 2016.

== Early life and education ==
Horan was born in Water Valley, Mississippi in 1961 and attended Water Valley High School. He earned a Bachelor of Business Administration degree from the University of Mississippi and a Juris Doctor from the Mississippi College School of Law.

== Career ==
Outside of politics, Horan is an attorney at Horan & Horan. He was also the CFO of Milestone Hospice. Horan was elected to the Mississippi House of Representatives in 2011 and assumed office in 2012. Initially elected as a Democrat, Horan registered as an independent in 2020 and later as a Republican. Horan also serves as chair of the House Corrections Committee.
