= Meese (band) =

American rock band

- Origin: Denver, Colorado, U.S.
- Genres: Alternative rock, indie rock
- Years active: 2004–2010
- Label: Atlantic
- Past members: Patrick Meese; Nathan Meese; Mike Ayars; David Vanderhamm; Ben Comerci; Ben Haley

Meese was a four-piece rock band from Denver, Colorado, signed to Atlantic Records. The name "Meese" is taken from the last name of the band's founders and brothers, Patrick and Nathan Meese. The other two members of the band were Ben Haley and Mike Ayars.

In July 2009, the band released their first major studio album, Broadcast, which was received with warm reviews. The album's first single, "Next In Line", was offered as a free single of the week in the iTunes Store.

Broadcast reached number 24 on Billboard's Heatseekers chart.

By March 2010, the band had been released from its contract by Atlantic.

In May 2010, Meese disbanded.

Patrick Meese would later play in the band Nathaniel Rateliff & the Night Sweats.

== Band members ==
- Patrick Meese (lead vocals, keyboards, guitar and programming), 2004–2010
- Nathan Meese (guitar, keyboards, backing vocals), 2005–2010
- Mike Ayars (guitar, keyboards, backing vocals), 2006–2010
- Joe Richmond (drums), 2009–2010
- Jeff Davenport (bass), 2007–2010
- Ben Haley (drums), 2006–2009
- David Vanderhamm (bass), 2004–2007
- Ben Comerci (drums), 2004–2006

== Discography ==
- The Oh No EP - 2005
- Our Album Year - 2006
- Winter Recordings EP - 2007 (iTunes release)
- The Start of It EP - 2008
- Broadcast - 2009
