= Tillatoba, Mississippi =

- Town
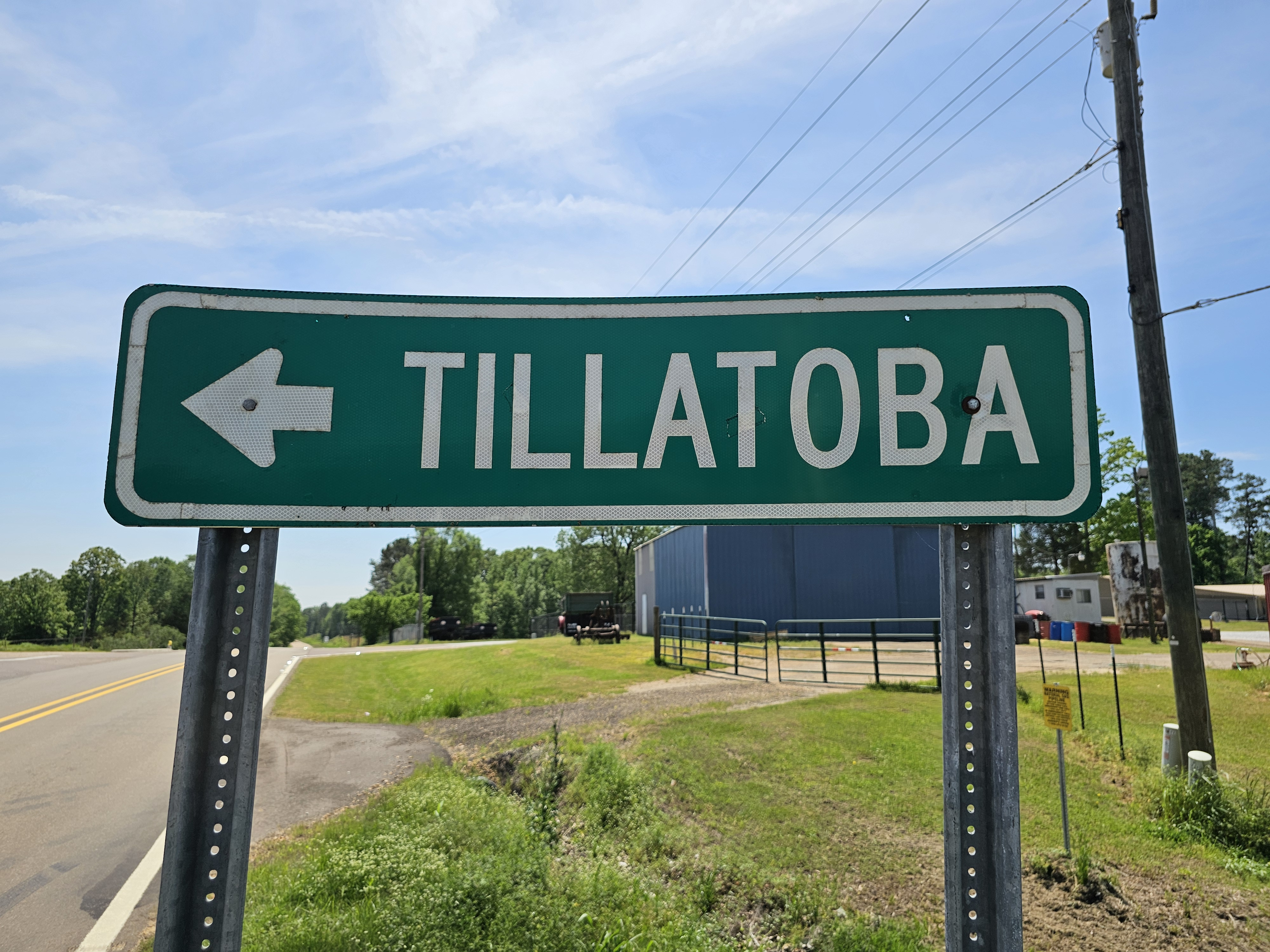

- Location of Tillatoba, Mississippi

- Location in the United States
- Coordinates: 33°59′4″N 89°53′49″W
- Country: United States
- State: Mississippi
- County: Yalobusha

Area
  - Total: 1.02 sq mi (2.63 km^{2})
  - Land: 1.02 sq mi (2.63 km^{2})
  - Water: 0 sq mi (0.00 km^{2})
- Elevation: 308 ft (94 m)

Population (2020)
  - Total: 95
  - Density: 93.7/sq mi (36.16/km^{2})
- Time zone: UTC-6 (Central (CST))
  - Summer (DST): UTC-5 (CDT)
- ZIP code: 38961
- Area code: 662
- FIPS code: 28-73440
- GNIS feature ID: 0694981

Tillatoba is a town in Yalobusha County, Mississippi, United States. As of the 2020 census, Tillatoba had a population of 95.

Agricultural products produced by the town include cotton, corn, poultry, cattle, and timber. Holly Springs National Forest is to the east.

== History ==
The community was named after Tillatoba Creek.

== Geography ==
According to the United States Census Bureau, the town has a total area of 1.0 square mile (2.6 km^{2}), all land.

== Demographics ==
Historical population
| Census | Pop. | Note | %± |
|---|---|---|---|
| 2020 | 95 | | — |
U.S. Decennial Census

=== 2020 census ===
Tillatoba racial composition
| Race | Num. | Perc. |
|---|---|---|
| White (non-Hispanic) | 75 | 78.95% |
| Black or African American (non-Hispanic) | 13 | 13.68% |
| Other/Mixed | 4 | 4.21% |
| Hispanic or Latino | 3 | 3.16% |

As of the 2020 United States census, there were 95 people, 26 households, and 12 families residing in the town.

=== 2000 census ===
As of the census of 2000, there were 121 people, 49 households, and 32 families residing in the town. The population density was 119.2 inhabitants per square mile (46.0/km^{2}). There were 54 housing units at an average density of 53.2 per square mile (20.5/km^{2}). The racial makeup of the town was 78.51% White, and 21.49% African American.

There were 49 households, out of which 34.7% had children under the age of 18 living with them, 49.0% were married couples living together, 16.3% had a female householder with no husband present, and 32.7% were non-families. 28.6% of all households were made up of individuals, and 10.2% had someone living alone who was 65 years of age or older. The average household size was 2.47 and the average family size was 3.06.

In the town, the population was spread out, with 28.1% under the age of 18, 9.1% from 18 to 24, 28.1% from 25 to 44, 25.6% from 45 to 64, and 9.1% who were 65 years of age or older. The median age was 32 years. For every 100 females, there were 108.6 males. For every 100 females age 18 and over, there were 97.7 males.

The median income for a household in the town was $34,306, and the median income for a family was $51,458. Males had a median income of $42,917 versus $22,143 for females. The per capita income for the town was $20,746. There were 13.7% of families and 10.1% of the population living below the poverty line, including no under eighteens and none of those over 64.

== Education ==
The Town of Tillatoba is served by the Coffeeville School District.

The community college district for the county is Northwest Mississippi Community College. The Lafayette-Yalobusha Technical Center is in Oxford.

== Notable person ==
- Jim Champion, American and Canadian Football player and coach.
