= Coffeeville, Mississippi =

- Town
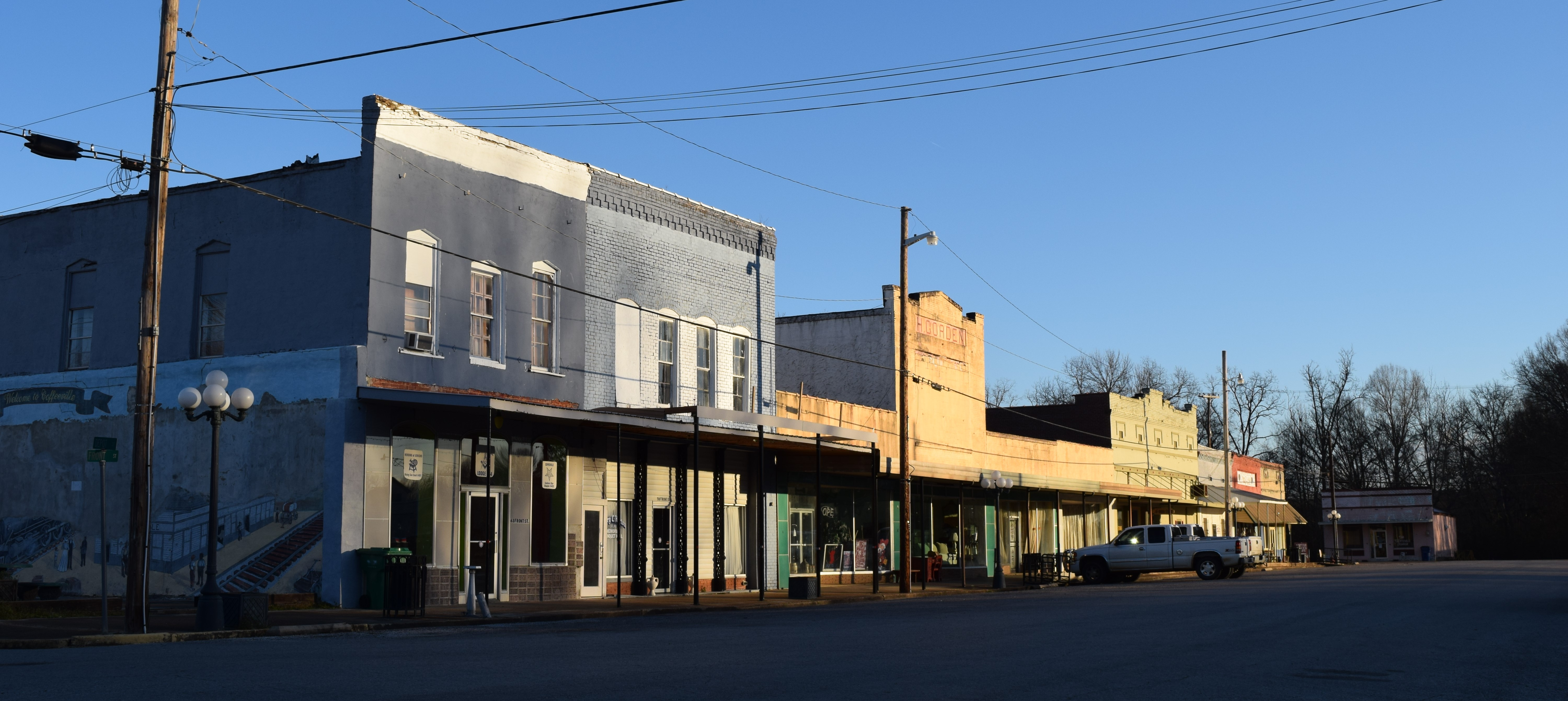
- Downtown Coffeeville along Front Street

- Location of Coffeeville, Mississippi

- Location in the United States
- Coordinates: 33°58′40″N 89°40′38″W
- Country: United States
- State: Mississippi
- County: Yalobusha

Area
  - Total: 2.14 sq mi (5.55 km^{2})
  - Land: 2.14 sq mi (5.55 km^{2})
  - Water: 0 sq mi (0.00 km^{2})
- Elevation: 266 ft (81 m)

Population (2020)
  - Total: 797
  - Density: 371.7/sq mi (143.53/km^{2})
- Time zone: UTC-6 (Central (CST))
  - Summer (DST): UTC-5 (CDT)
- ZIP code: 38922
- Area code: 662
- FIPS code: 28-14740
- GNIS feature ID: 0692939
- Website: www.coffeevillems.com

Coffeeville is a town in and one of two county seats of Yalobusha County, Mississippi, United States. As of the 2020 census, Coffeeville had a population of 797. It is named after John Coffee (1772–1833), a planter and military leader. The minor American Civil War Battle of Coffeeville took place near here in December 1862.

Water Valley, Mississippi, in the northeastern part of the county, is the second county seat and judicial district. Once a center of railroad shops, it is the largest city in the county.

== Geography ==
According to the United States Census Bureau, the town has a total area of 2.2 square miles (5.7 km^{2}), all land.

== Demographics ==
Historical population
Census	Pop.	Note	%±
1880	749		—
1890	465		−37.9%
1900	467		0.4%
1910	421		−9.9%
1920	411		−2.4%
1930	456		10.9%
1940	481		5.5%
1950	739		53.6%
1960	813		10.0%
1970	1,024		26.0%
1980	1,129		10.3%
1990	825		−26.9%
2000	930		12.7%
2010	905		−2.7%
2020	797		−11.9%
U.S. Decennial Census

=== Racial and ethnic composition ===
Coffeeville town, Mississippi – Racial and ethnic composition Note: the US Census treats Hispanic/Latino as an ethnic category. This table excludes Latinos from the racial categories and assigns them to a separate category. Hispanics/Latinos may be of any race.
Race / Ethnicity (NH = Non-Hispanic)	Pop 2000	Pop 2010	Pop 2020	% 2000	% 2010	% 2020
White alone (NH)	414	374	257	44.52%	41.33%	32.25%
Black or African American alone (NH)	495	501	518	53.23%	55.36%	64.99%
Native American or Alaska Native alone (NH)	1	0	3	0.11%	0.00%	0.38%
Asian alone (NH)	0	6	2	0.00%	0.66%	0.25%
Native Hawaiian or Pacific Islander alone (NH)	0	0	0	0.00%	0.00%	0.00%
Other race alone (NH)	0	1	0	0.00%	0.11%	0.00%
Mixed race or Multiracial (NH)	3	13	14	0.32%	1.44%	1.76%
Hispanic or Latino (any race)	17	10	3	1.83%	1.10%	0.38%
Total	930	905	797	100.00%	100.00%	100.00%

=== 2020 census ===
As of the 2020 United States census, there were 797 people, 457 households, and 268 families residing in the town.

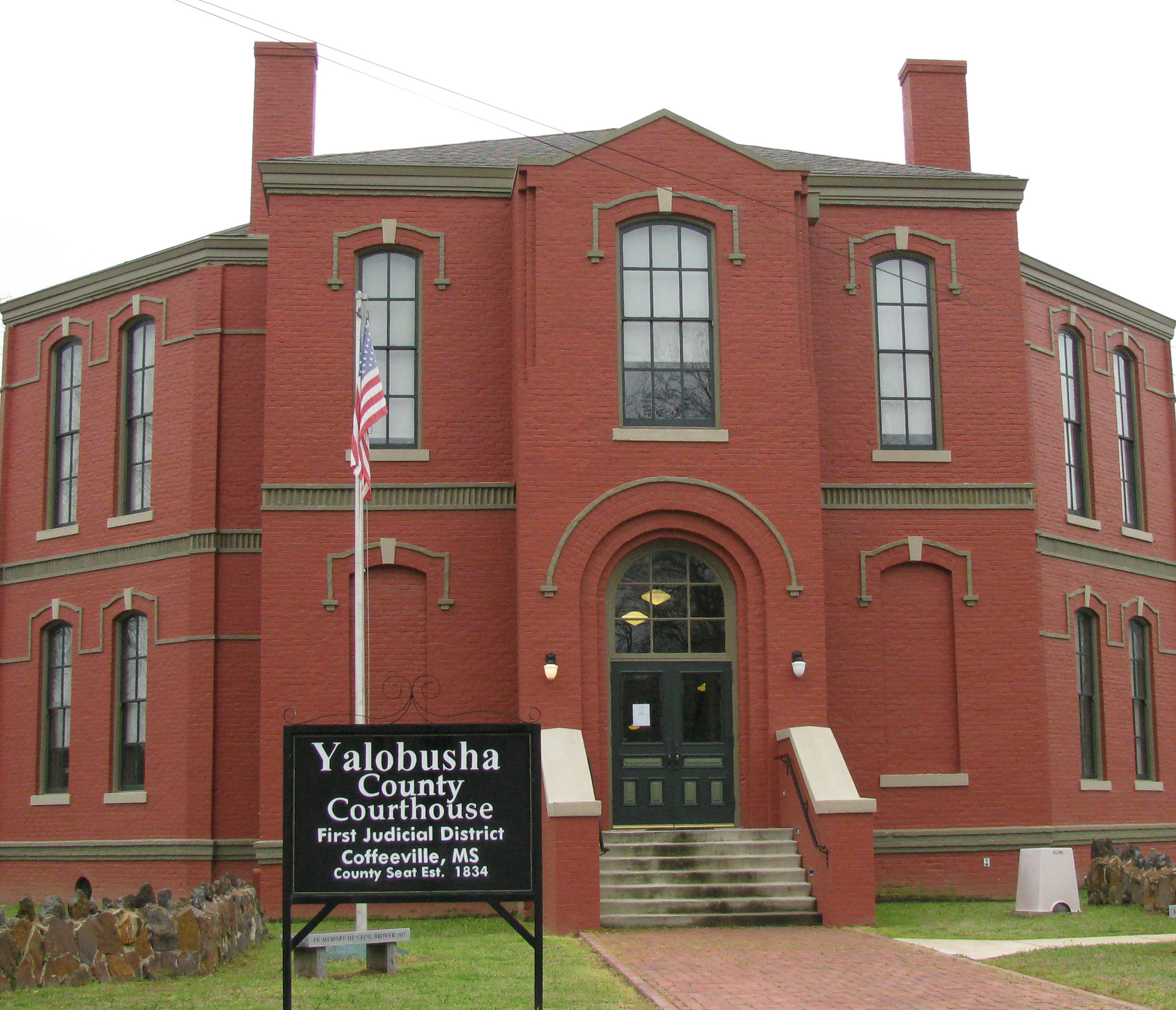
Yalobusha County Courthouse

=== 2000 census ===
As of the census of 2000, there were 930 people, 401 households, and 261 families residing in the town. The population density was 423.4 inhabitants per square mile (163.5/km^{2}). There were 464 housing units at an average density of 211.3 per square mile (81.6/km^{2}). The racial makeup of the town was 54.52% African American, 44.84% White, 0.32% Native American, and 0.32% from two or more races. Hispanic or Latino of any race were 1.83% of the population.

There were 401 households, out of which 25.7% had children under the age of 18 living with them, 38.4% were married couples living together, 21.9% had a female householder with no husband present, and 34.9% were non-families. 32.4% of all households were made up of individuals, and 20.0% had someone living alone who was 65 years of age or older. The average household size was 2.32 and the average family size was 2.93.

In the town, the population was spread out, with 24.8% under the age of 18, 8.2% from 18 to 24, 23.3% from 25 to 44, 24.3% from 45 to 64, and 19.4% who were 65 years of age or older. The median age was 39 years. For every 100 females, there were 74.5 males. For every 100 females age 18 and over, there were 68.8 males.

The median income for a household in the town was $24,712, and the median income for a family was $31,000. Males had a median income of $25,592 versus $20,294 for females. The per capita income for the town was $13,758. About 23.1% of families and 28.5% of the population were below the poverty line, including 44.3% of those under age 18 and 14.5% of those age 65 or over.

== Education ==
The Town of Coffeeville is served by the Coffeeville School District.

The community college district for the county is Northwest Mississippi Community College. The Lafayette-Yalobusha Technical Center is in Oxford.

== Notable people ==
- Charles Caldwell (1943–2003), American musician
- George E. Denley (1867–1942), member of the Mississippi House of Representatives (1916 to 1924) and Mississippi State Senate (1928 to 1932)
- Belton Johnson (b. 1980), former professional football player (2003–2012)
- Marcus Johnson (b. 1981), American college football coach and former NFL player
- James F. Lewis (1944–1983), US Army major (1962–1970), CIA officer (1970–1983) killed in the line of duty
- Dunbar Rowland (1864–1937), historian and archivist who served as director of Mississippi Department of Archives and History for 35 years
- Isaac Van Zandt (1813–1847), lawyer, diplomat and legislator
- Edward C. Walthall (1831–1898), major general CSA, US senator (1885–1894, 1895–1898)
