= Yalobusha County, Mississippi =

County in Mississippi, United States

- County
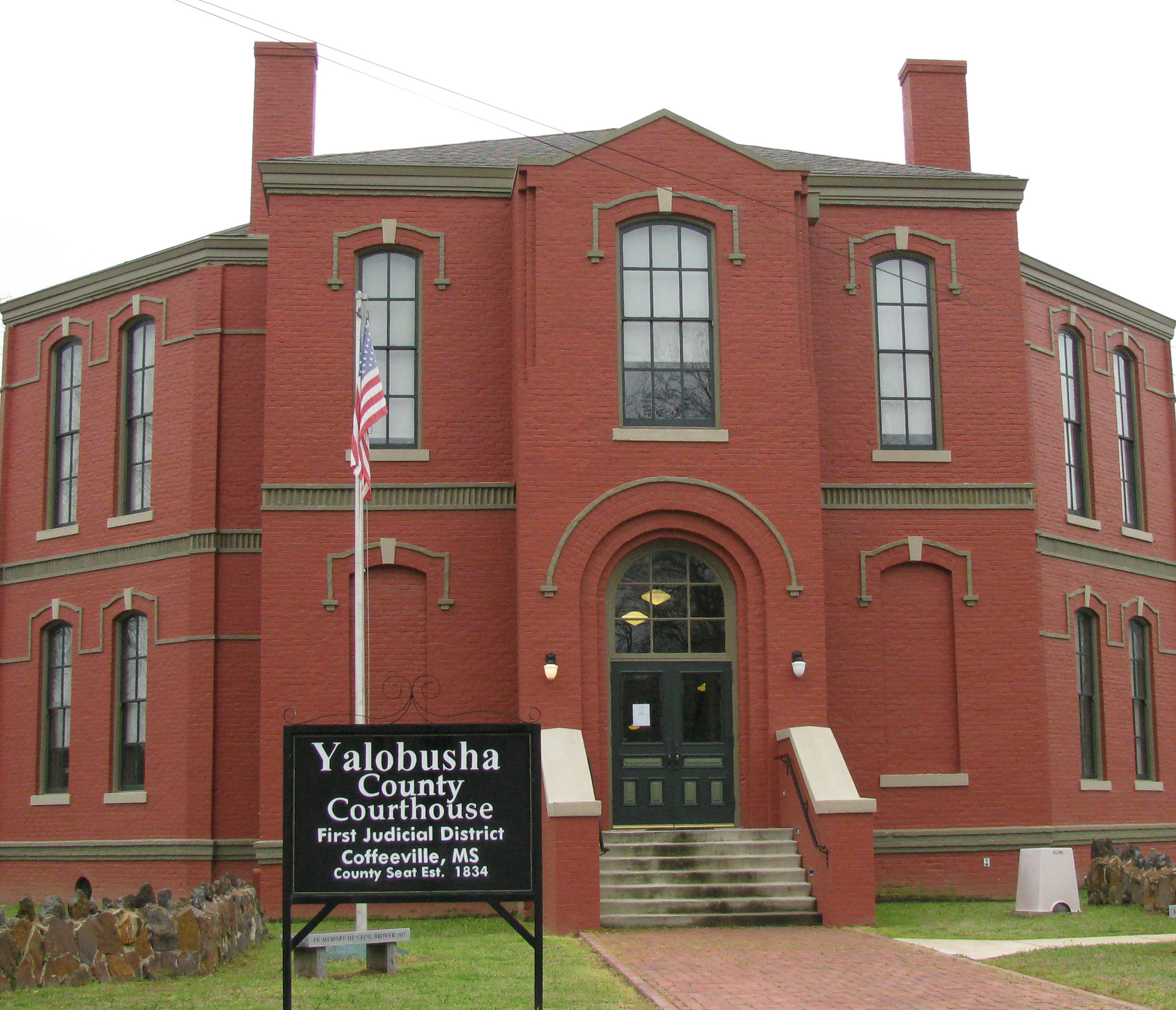
- Yalobusha County Courthouse in Coffeeville

- Location within the U.S. state of Mississippi
- Coordinates: 34°02′N 89°43′W
- Country: United States
- State: Mississippi
- Founded: February 21, 1834
- Seat: Coffeeville and Water Valley
- Largest city: Water Valley

Area
  - Total: 495 sq mi (1,280 km^{2})
  - Land: 467 sq mi (1,210 km^{2})
  - Water: 28 sq mi (73 km^{2}) 5.6%

Population (2020)
  - Total: 12,481
  - Estimate (2025): 12,375 ▼
  - Density: 26.7/sq mi (10.3/km^{2})
- Time zone: UTC−6 (Central)
  - Summer (DST): UTC−5 (CDT)
- Congressional district: 2nd
- Website: www.yalobushaonline.org

Yalobusha County (/ˈjælæˌbʊʃə/ YA-la-buush-ə) is a county located in the U.S. state of Mississippi. As of the 2020 census, the population was 12,481. It has two county seats, Water Valley and Coffeeville.

== History ==
=== Origins ===
Yalobusha is a Native American word, likely from the Muskogee language family, meaning "tadpole place." This region was long a traditional homeland of bands of both the Choctaw and Chickasaw Indian tribes, who occupied lands in present-day Mississippi and Alabama.

=== 19th century ===
In 1816, General Andrew Jackson ordered the surveying of the line between the Choctaw and Chickasaw peoples. The line as surveyed cut almost a perfect diagonal across the area of present-day Yalobusha County. European Americans increasingly encroached on the Native American territories of the Southeast and, after being elected as president in 1828, Jackson gained passage of the Indian Removal Act of 1830, to force tribes out of lands east of the Mississippi River.

In 1830, the Choctaw ceded their Mississippi lands to the United States in the Treaty of Dancing Rabbit Creek. Two years later, the Chickasaw signed the Treaty of Pontotoc, ceding their lands to the United States. Both tribes were removed west to new lands assigned in Indian Territory (present-day Oklahoma).

In 1833, the Mississippi Legislature authorized the formation of 17 counties, including Yalobusha, on what had been Indian land.

Yalobusha County was officially organized and its first officials elected on February 21, 1834. The first Board of Police (Supervisors) held its first meeting at Hendersonville, then the largest town in the county. It had been established in 1798 by John Henderson, a Presbyterian missionary, who was one of the first white (or European-American men) to settle in the area. Other early settlements by whites included Elliot, Chocchuma, Tuscohoma, Pittsburg, Talahoma, Plummerville, Preston, Pharsalia, Sardinia, and Washington.

At its first meeting the Board of Police solicited donations of land for a county seat. At its second meeting, the Board selected the site, naming it Coffeeville in honor of General John Coffee, who had represented the United States in treaty negotiations with the Choctaw and Chickasaw. The next meeting of the Board was held in the new settlement, and in 1837 the first county courthouse was built.

The same year, G. B. Ragsdale, an early settler in the northeastern part of the county, established a stagecoach stand near what is now Water Valley. In 1848 the town of Oakland, Mississippi, was chartered on the site.

Yalobusha County had a population of 12,248 when its first census was taken in 1840. In 1844, a post office was opened at Ragsdale's Stand. Three years later, the post office and stagecoach stand were moved to land owned by William Carr, and the name was changed to Water Valley.

James K. Polk of Tennessee, who served as president of the United States from 1845 to 1849, was a prominent early landowner in Yalobusha County. In 1835 he purchased a cotton plantation south of Coffeeville. After his death in 1849, Polk's widow managed the plantation successfully for a number of years before selling it.

By 1850, the county's population had grown to 17,258. In 1852, Calhoun County was formed, and a tier of townships on the eastern border of Yalobusha County were taken to form part of the new county.

The Illinois Central Railroad built a branch line from Jackson, Tennessee to Grenada, passing through Water Valley and Coffeeville, in the late 1850s. ICRR officials wanted to set up maintenance shops in Coffeeville, but could not obtain the property they wanted. Residents of the fledgling town of Water Valley offered to donate the needed land to the railroad. After the shops were located there, Water Valley attracted workers and related businesses, and quickly became the largest town in the county. It was officially chartered in 1858, with a population of 300.

Water Valley became a thriving community with two hotels and several churches. The first church there was the Presbyterian Church, built in 1843. Two years later, the First Methodist Church was organized, followed in 1860 by the First Baptist Church of Water Valley. In 1860, the county's population was 16,952.

With the completion of the railroad from New Orleans to the Ohio River, Water Valley was an important railroad community on the Mississippi Central railroad at the outset of the Civil War.

On December 5, 1862, the minor Battle of Coffeeville was fought. A Confederate force ambushed a larger Federal cavalry column. The Union forces fell back to Water Valley. Fewer than fifty men in total died in the skirmish.

After the war, the ICRR railroad shops were built at Water Valley, bringing a large influx of new workers and residents to the town. In 1867, Yalobusha County's first manufacturing industry, Yacona Mills, was the world's largest manufacturer of twine.

The Reconstruction legislature in Mississippi created a number of new counties. Grenada County was formed in 1870 and included nearly two tiers of townships which had formerly been the southern part of Yalobusha County.

In March 1873, Yalobusha County was divided into two judicial districts, and Water Valley was named the county seat of the second judicial district. Because the town overlapped the Yalobusha-Lafayette County line, the legislature gave Yalobusha a two-mile strip of land from the southern portion of Lafayette County.

The town of Tillatoba was chartered in 1873. In 1880, Yalobusha County's population was 15,649.

In 1889, Coffeeville's second courthouse, which had been built in 1840 at a cost of $25,000, burned down. A new courthouse, also costing $25,000, was built in 1890. That year, the county population was 16,629.

Famed railroad engineer J. L. "Casey" Jones moved from Jackson, Tennessee to Water Valley in 1893. In 1896, four years before his death in a notable train wreck, Jones moved back to Jackson.

A new courthouse was built in Water Valley in 1896. Some 16 years later it was destroyed by an accidental fire. The second judicial district offices were moved to the Water Valley City Hall, but within a month, it too burned. The courthouse was reconstructed after the fire. A third floor was added but it was never completed.

=== 20th and 21st centuries ===
Yalobusha County's population peaked in 1910, with the census showing a population of 21,519. By 1920, the population had fallen to 18,738. Effects of the boll weevil and changes in mechanized agriculture reduced the number of workers needed. In this period, many African Americans moved north to industrial cities in the Great Migration, to leave the violence and Jim Crow rules of the segregated South. The population continued to decline steadily for the next 50 years.

Between 1926 and 1928, Yalobusha County suffered two major economic setbacks. In April 1926, Yacona Twine Mill, which had employed approximately 450 people, was destroyed by fire. The following year, the ICRR began moving its railroad shops from Water Valley to Paducah, Kentucky. By the end of 1928, these shops, which had at one time employed over 800 people, were completely closed.

In 1931, Water Valley held its first Watermelon Carnival. It was a great success, bringing 20,000 visitors to the city. The Watermelon Carnival became an annual event bringing national recognition to Water Valley, which in 1932 proclaimed itself the "Watermelon Capital of the World". After the US entered World War II in December 1941, the Carnival was suspended the following year. It was not resumed until 1980. Since then it is again held annually, the first Saturday in August.

After WWII, little industry remained in Yalobusha County. By 1950 the county's population had declined to 15,191. In the early 1950s the U.S. Army Corps of Engineers began work on two flood control reservoirs in and around the county, to the distress of county farmers who lost thousands of acres of fertile bottom land. Enid Lake and Grenada Lake, both completed in 1955 as part of the flood control project, are now popular recreation spots for locals and for visitors.

Yalobusha County's population was 12,502 in 1960, and in 1970, it was 11,915. The following census showed the county gained some 1,200 new residents, giving it a 1980 population of 13,139.

Since the 1960s, the county has attracted new industries. At present, its two largest employers have a combined total of more than 2,000 employees, and several other industries provide hundreds of additional jobs for county residents.

== Geography ==
The county has a total area of 495 square miles (1,280 km^{2}), of which 467 square miles (1,210 km^{2}) is land and 28 square miles (73 km^{2}) (5.6%) is water.

=== Major highways ===
- Interstate 55
- U.S. Highway 51
- Mississippi Highway 7
- Mississippi Highway 32
- Mississippi Highway 315
- Mississippi Highway 330

Adjacent counties

- Lafayette County (northeast)
- Calhoun County (east)
- Grenada County (south)
- Tallahatchie County (west)
- Panola County (northwest)

=== National protected area ===
- Holly Springs National Forest (part)

== Demographics ==
Historical population
| Census | Pop. | Note | %± |
|---|---|---|---|
| 1840 | 12,248 | | — |
| 1850 | 17,258 | | 40.9% |
| 1860 | 16,952 | | −1.8% |
| 1870 | 13,254 | | −21.8% |
| 1880 | 15,649 | | 18.1% |
| 1890 | 16,629 | | 6.3% |
| 1900 | 19,742 | | 18.7% |
| 1910 | 21,519 | | 9.0% |
| 1920 | 18,738 | | −12.9% |
| 1930 | 17,750 | | −5.3% |
| 1940 | 18,387 | | 3.6% |
| 1950 | 15,191 | | −17.4% |
| 1960 | 12,502 | | −17.7% |
| 1970 | 11,915 | | −4.7% |
| 1980 | 13,139 | | 10.3% |
| 1990 | 12,033 | | −8.4% |
| 2000 | 13,051 | | 8.5% |
| 2010 | 12,678 | | −2.9% |
| 2020 | 12,481 | | −1.6% |
| 2025 (est.) | 12,375 | ▼ | −0.8% |
U.S. Decennial Census; 1790-1960 1900-1990; 1990-2000 2010-2013

Age pyramid Yalobusha County

=== Racial and ethnic composition ===
Yalobusha County, Mississippi – Racial and ethnic composition Note: the US Census treats Hispanic/Latino as an ethnic category. This table excludes Latinos from the racial categories and assigns them to a separate category. Hispanics/Latinos may be of any race.
| Race / Ethnicity (NH = Non-Hispanic) | Pop 1980 | Pop 1990 | Pop 2000 | Pop 2010 | Pop 2020 | % 1980 | % 1990 | % 2000 | % 2010 | % 2020 |
|---|---|---|---|---|---|---|---|---|---|---|
| White alone (NH) | 8,033 | 7,448 | 7,827 | 7,606 | 7,331 | 61.14% | 61.90% | 59.97% | 59.99% | 58.74% |
| Black or African American alone (NH) | 4,942 | 4,512 | 5,006 | 4,772 | 4,615 | 37.61% | 37.50% | 38.36% | 37.64% | 36.98% |
| Native American or Alaska Native alone (NH) | 3 | 10 | 26 | 30 | 24 | 0.02% | 0.08% | 0.20% | 0.24% | 0.19% |
| Asian alone (NH) | 13 | 10 | 11 | 20 | 21 | 0.10% | 0.08% | 0.08% | 0.16% | 0.17% |
| Native Hawaiian or Pacific Islander alone (NH) | x | x | 11 | 1 | 2 | x | x | 0.08% | 0.01% | 0.02% |
| Other race alone (NH) | 4 | 0 | 0 | 4 | 16 | 0.03% | 0.00% | 0.00% | 0.03% | 0.13% |
| Mixed race or Multiracial (NH) | x | x | 43 | 94 | 309 | x | x | 0.33% | 0.74% | 2.48% |
| Hispanic or Latino (any race) | 144 | 53 | 127 | 151 | 163 | 1.10% | 0.44% | 0.97% | 1.19% | 1.31% |
| Total | 13,139 | 12,033 | 13,051 | 12,678 | 12,481 | 100.00% | 100.00% | 100.00% | 100.00% | 100.00% |

=== 2020 census ===
As of the 2020 census, the county had a population of 12,481. The median age was 46.4 years. 20.0% of residents were under the age of 18 and 23.5% of residents were 65 years of age or older. For every 100 females there were 92.6 males, and for every 100 females age 18 and over there were 90.7 males age 18 and over.

The racial makeup of the county was 59.1% White, 37.2% Black or African American, 0.2% American Indian and Alaska Native, 0.2% Asian, <0.1% Native Hawaiian and Pacific Islander, 0.5% from some other race, and 2.8% from two or more races. Hispanic or Latino residents of any race comprised 1.3% of the population.

<0.1% of residents lived in urban areas, while 100.0% lived in rural areas.

There were 5,399 households in the county, of which 25.5% had children under the age of 18 living in them. Of all households, 38.5% were married-couple households, 21.7% were households with a male householder and no spouse or partner present, and 34.1% were households with a female householder and no spouse or partner present. About 34.0% of all households were made up of individuals and 15.2% had someone living alone who was 65 years of age or older.

There were 6,405 housing units, of which 15.7% were vacant. Among occupied housing units, 73.7% were owner-occupied and 26.3% were renter-occupied. The homeowner vacancy rate was 1.6% and the rental vacancy rate was 22.6%.

=== 2000 census ===
As of the census of 2000, there were 13,051 people, 5,260 households, and 3,597 families residing in the county. The population density was 28 people per square mile (11 people/km^{2}). There were 6,224 housing units at an average density of 13 units per square mile (5.0 units/km^{2}). The racial makeup of the county was 60.46% White, 38.66% Black or African American, 0.21% Native American, 0.08% Asian, 0.08% Pacific Islander, 0.09% from other races, and 0.41% from two or more races. 0.97% of the population were Hispanic or Latino of any race.

There were 5,260 households, out of which 29.70% had children under the age of 18 living with them, 46.60% were married couples living together, 17.60% had a female householder with no husband present, and 31.60% were non-families. 28.70% of all households were made up of individuals, and 14.00% had someone living alone who was 65 years of age or older. The average household size was 2.46 and the average family size was 3.02.

In the county, the population was spread out, with 25.60% under the age of 18, 8.90% from 18 to 24, 26.10% from 25 to 44, 23.80% from 45 to 64, and 15.70% who were 65 years of age or older. The median age was 38 years. For every 100 females there were 91.30 males. For every 100 females age 18 and over, there were 86.20 males.

The median income for a household in the county was $26,315, and the median income for a family was $31,801. Males had a median income of $27,009 versus $20,236 for females. The per capita income for the county was $14,953. About 19.50% of families and 21.80% of the population were below the poverty line, including 30.10% of those under age 18 and 21.20% of those age 65 or over.

== Communities ==
=== City ===
- Water Valley (county seat)

=== Towns ===
- Coffeeville (county seat)
- Oakland
- Tillatoba

=== Unincorporated communities ===
- Scobey

=== Ghost towns ===
- Hendersonville
- Leggo

== Notable people ==
- James K. Polk, future president, lived at a plantation south of Coffeeville from 1835 to later in life
- Don Briscoe, television/soap opera actor (1940–2004)

== Education ==
It has two school districts: Coffeeville School District and Water Valley School District.

The community college district for the county is Northwest Mississippi Community College. The Lafayette-Yalobusha Technical Center is in Oxford.

== Politics ==
Yalobusha County was a Democratic-leaning swing county prior to the 2004 presidential election, usually only supporting Republicans in national landslides. Since then it has swung into the Republican column, increasingly so in recent elections. The 2024 election showed the strongest Republican support in the county since 1972.

United States presidential election results for Yalobusha County, Mississippi
| Year | Republican | | Democratic | | Third party(ies) | |
| Year | No. | % | No. | % | No. | % |
|---|---|---|---|---|---|---|
| 1912 | 22 | 2.55% | 788 | 91.31% | 53 | 6.14% |
| 1916 | 49 | 3.98% | 1,175 | 95.53% | 6 | 0.49% |
| 1920 | 82 | 8.33% | 892 | 90.65% | 10 | 1.02% |
| 1924 | 53 | 3.91% | 1,292 | 95.28% | 11 | 0.81% |
| 1928 | 204 | 14.04% | 1,249 | 85.96% | 0 | 0.00% |
| 1932 | 39 | 2.46% | 1,536 | 97.03% | 8 | 0.51% |
| 1936 | 25 | 1.82% | 1,350 | 98.04% | 2 | 0.15% |
| 1940 | 50 | 3.12% | 1,555 | 96.88% | 0 | 0.00% |
| 1944 | 97 | 5.78% | 1,582 | 94.22% | 0 | 0.00% |
| 1948 | 49 | 3.13% | 135 | 8.61% | 1,384 | 88.27% |
| 1952 | 753 | 35.87% | 1,346 | 64.13% | 0 | 0.00% |
| 1956 | 414 | 24.41% | 1,015 | 59.85% | 267 | 15.74% |
| 1960 | 549 | 28.85% | 650 | 34.16% | 704 | 36.99% |
| 1964 | 2,385 | 90.20% | 259 | 9.80% | 0 | 0.00% |
| 1968 | 562 | 13.51% | 873 | 20.99% | 2,725 | 65.50% |
| 1972 | 2,944 | 77.53% | 797 | 20.99% | 56 | 1.47% |
| 1976 | 1,808 | 40.15% | 2,603 | 57.81% | 92 | 2.04% |
| 1980 | 2,224 | 38.46% | 3,432 | 59.35% | 127 | 2.20% |
| 1984 | 2,934 | 55.52% | 2,337 | 44.22% | 14 | 0.26% |
| 1988 | 2,660 | 52.23% | 2,402 | 47.16% | 31 | 0.61% |
| 1992 | 2,179 | 41.52% | 2,617 | 49.87% | 452 | 8.61% |
| 1996 | 1,711 | 38.04% | 2,437 | 54.18% | 350 | 7.78% |
| 2000 | 2,470 | 47.25% | 2,674 | 51.15% | 84 | 1.61% |
| 2004 | 3,278 | 54.90% | 2,656 | 44.48% | 37 | 0.62% |
| 2008 | 3,628 | 53.15% | 3,151 | 46.16% | 47 | 0.69% |
| 2012 | 3,276 | 51.56% | 3,030 | 47.69% | 48 | 0.76% |
| 2016 | 3,376 | 55.55% | 2,582 | 42.49% | 119 | 1.96% |
| 2020 | 3,671 | 56.17% | 2,785 | 42.62% | 79 | 1.21% |
| 2024 | 3,518 | 59.85% | 2,289 | 38.94% | 71 | 1.21% |

== See also ==
- National Register of Historic Places listings in Yalobusha County, Mississippi
