= Prom Night in Mississippi =

- film poster
- Directed by: Paul Saltzman
- Written by: Paul Saltzman
- Produced by: Paul Saltzman; Patricia Aquino
- Cinematography: Paul Kolycius; Don Warren
- Edited by: Stephen Philipson; David Ransley; Kevin Schjerning
- Music by: Asher Lenz; Jack Lenz
- Production company: Return to Mississippi Productions
- Distributed by: HBO
- Release date: December 11, 2009
- Running time: 90 minutes
- Country: United States
- Language: English
- Budget: $750,000

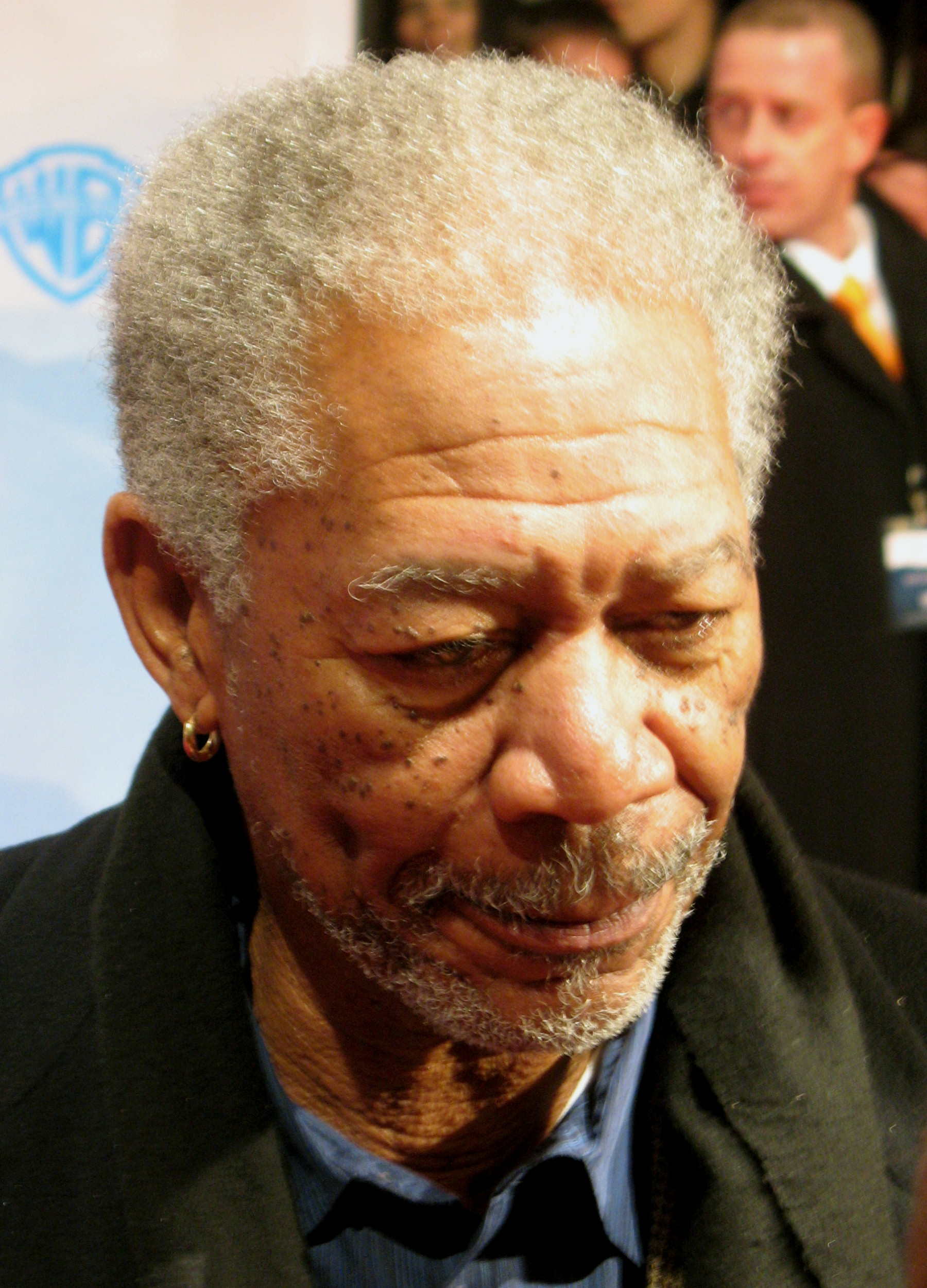
Morgan Freeman, a resident of Charleston, funded the first racially integrated prom in Charleston, which was the subject of Prom Night in Mississippi.

Prom Night in Mississippi is a 2009 Canadian-American documentary film written and directed by Paul Saltzman. The documentary follows a group of 2008 Charleston High School high school seniors in Charleston, Mississippi as they prepare for their senior prom, the first racially integrated prom in Charleston history.

== Background and production ==
The prom was funded by Morgan Freeman, a Charleston resident, and exposed racial tension in the town, mainly among administrators and parents of the students of the high school. Filmed on location in Mississippi, Prom Night in Mississippi was directed by Canadian director Paul Saltzman with his wife Patricia Aquino acting as producer. It was filmed over a four-month period on a budget of $750,000 of the director's own money. The crew shot over 165 hours of footage, 89 minutes of which were used in the final version. It was shown on HBO, premiered in Toronto on November 12, 2009, and had its theatrical release on December 11, 2009.

== Documentary ==
The documentary is about the senior prom in Charleston, Mississippi. The high school in Charleston (a community of 2,100 residents) has an average of 80 graduates per year, and up until 2008 had separate, segregated proms for Black students and White students, despite Mississippi fully integrating their schools in 1970. In 1997 Morgan Freeman (a resident of Charleston since 1991) approached the school and offered to pay for the prom, provided it be racially integrated. The school declined Freeman's offer. In 2008 Freeman offered again, and the school agreed to move forward with an integrated prom.

Saltzman follows a group of students, both Black and White, over four months as they prepare for their senior prom. The students discuss segregation in Charleston and how they feel about it. The documentary also explores issues such as interracial relationships, and what the parents think about an integrated prom. The integrated prom is successful despite some parents' forbidding their children to attend it. The film brought some racial tension to the town of Charleston, mostly from the parents and school authorities concerned with "tradition and security issues", with a group of parents planning a separate prom for White students only.

== Recognition ==
=== Awards and nominations ===
- 2009, Won Target Filmmaker Award for Best Documentary, AFI Dallas International Film Festival
- 2009, Won Audience Choice Award, Jackson Crossroads Film Festival
- 2009, Won Audience Choice Award, Oxford Film Festival, Mississippi
- 2009, Nominated for Grand Jury Prize for World Cinema – Documentary at Sundance Film Festival

== See also ==
- Segregated prom
