= John William Meece =

American politician

Mississippi Legislature
- In office November 7, 1911 – Unknown
- President: Theodore Roosevelt
- Governor: Edmond Noel
- Constituency: Water Valley, Mississippi

Personal details
- Born: June 3, 1843
- Died: 1924
- Party: Democratic Party
- Spouse: Elizabeth Jason Jefcoat
- Occupation: Teacher
- Committees: Pensions; Education; Census; Apportionment

Military service
- Allegiance: Confederate States of America
- Branch/service: Confederate States Army
- Rank: Sergeant
- Unit: Company K, 24th Mississippi Regiment, Walthall's Brigade

John William Meece (born June 3, 1843) was a member of the Mississippi Legislature in 1911.

He also served as a Sergeant for the Confederate States of America during the American Civil War. After the war, Meece taught for several years in different counties and was married to Elizabeth Jason Jefcoat in 1874. Meece was elected to the Mississippi Legislature in 1911.
