= Charleston High School (Mississippi) =

Location
- 310 North Cossar Street; Charleston, Tallahatchie, Mississippi 38921; United States
- 34.011471°N 90.048065°W

Information
- Type: Public
- School district: East Tallahatchie School District
- Principal: Eric Rice
- Teaching staff: 23.75 (on an FTE basis)
- Grades: 9–12
- Enrollment: 272 (2023–2024)
- Student to teacher ratio: 11.45
- Colors: Black and Gold
- Athletics conference: MHSAA Region 3, 2A
- Mascot: Tiger
- Team name: Tigers
- Rival: West Tallahatchie
- Website: CHS website

Charleston High School is a public high school in Charleston, Mississippi, United States.

In addition to Charleston it serves Tippo.

== History ==
In 1999 there was $100,000 spent for a laboratory for biology classes.

The school held its first racially integrated prom in April 2008, which was the subject of the 2008 HBO documentary Prom Night in Mississippi. The documentary focused on the school and the efforts to have a mixed prom instead of segregated proms, with one for whites and the other for blacks.

In 2010, the graduation rate was 68.8%. The school district is considered to be "at risk of failing" by the No Child Left Behind standards.

== Notable alumni ==
- Deantre Prince, college football cornerback for the Ole Miss Rebels
