= Segregated prom =

Practice of holding separate school proms for white and black students

A segregated prom refers to the practice in high schools in the United States, particularly in the South, of holding racially segregated proms for white and black students. Although such schools were officially integrated from the 1970s onward, the tradition of separate proms continued in certain areas. The practice has persisted in a few rural communities into the present day and has frequently attracted negative media attention as well as being depicted in several films.

== History ==
Prior to the 1954 decision of the Supreme Court of the United States in Brown v. Board of Education, most schools in the southern United States were racially segregated. The process of integration of schools was slow, and many schools did not become integrated until the late 1960s and early 1970s. In order to avoid having to hold an integrated prom, many high schools stopped sponsoring any prom, and private segregated proms were organized as a replacement. Sometimes a concern over interracial dating was cited as the reason for not holding a single prom. Other schools cited liability concerns as the reason for not sponsoring a prom.

In addition to segregated proms, some schools have also elected black and white homecoming kings and queens, class officers, and even awarded separate black and white superlatives such as "Most Likely To Succeed." School sponsored separate events, including separate homecoming queens or superlatives, have been deemed to violate federal law by the United States Department of Justice.

In 1990, The New York Times reported that 10 counties in Georgia were still holding segregated proms. Though the practice has been reported to be on the decline since the 1980s, occasional press reports seem to show it persists in some rural locations. Since 1987, media sources have reported on segregated proms being held in the U.S. states of Alabama, Arkansas, Georgia, Louisiana, Mississippi, South Carolina, and Texas.

In two places in Georgia, the "black prom" was open to attendance by all students. Only the "white prom" was racially exclusive.

School alumni at schools which held segregated proms sometimes hold segregated class reunions as well.

=== Outside the Deep South ===
Even prior to integration in the South, there have been instances of segregated proms being held in integrated schools in the northern United States. In the late 1920s, for example, separate proms for blacks and whites are recorded as occurring at Froebel High School in Gary, Indiana.

== Notable cases ==
- Charleston, Mississippi: In 1997, actor Morgan Freeman offered to fund a racially integrated prom in Charleston, Mississippi, where he lives. The offer was turned down. In 2007, he made the offer again and it was accepted, and the school held its first integrated prom in 2008, profiled in the documentary Prom Night in Mississippi.
- Taylor County, Georgia: In 2002, Taylor County, Georgia made international news for holding its first integrated prom, and again when a group of white students held a separate prom the following year. The 2006 film For One Night is based on these events.
- Toombs County, Georgia: In 2004, it was reported that Hispanic students at Toombs County High School had planned their own prom, and that separate white, black, and Hispanic proms would be held. The school, 56% white, 31% black, and 12% Hispanic, had been holding separate white and black proms since 1971.
- Montgomery County, Georgia: In 2009, The New York Times and The Daily Telegraph both profiled the racially segregated prom in Montgomery County, Georgia.
- Wilcox County, Georgia: In 2013, the New York Times published an article about Wilcox County High School's first integrated prom, which took place that year, and was organized by students.

== See also ==
- Prom Night in Mississippi, 2009 documentary that follows a group of Charleston, Mississippi high-school students preparing for their first racially integrated prom in town history.
- For One Night, 2006 film based on first integrated prom in Taylor County, Georgia held in 2002.
- Hulond Humphries, former principal in Randolph County, Alabama who threatened to cancel the school prom in the mid-1990s to prevent attendance by interracial couples.
- 2010 Itawamba County School District prom controversy, in which a private prom was organized by a school in order to exclude a lesbian student and her date from attending.
- Racial segregation of churches in the United States
