= Oakland, Mississippi =

- Town
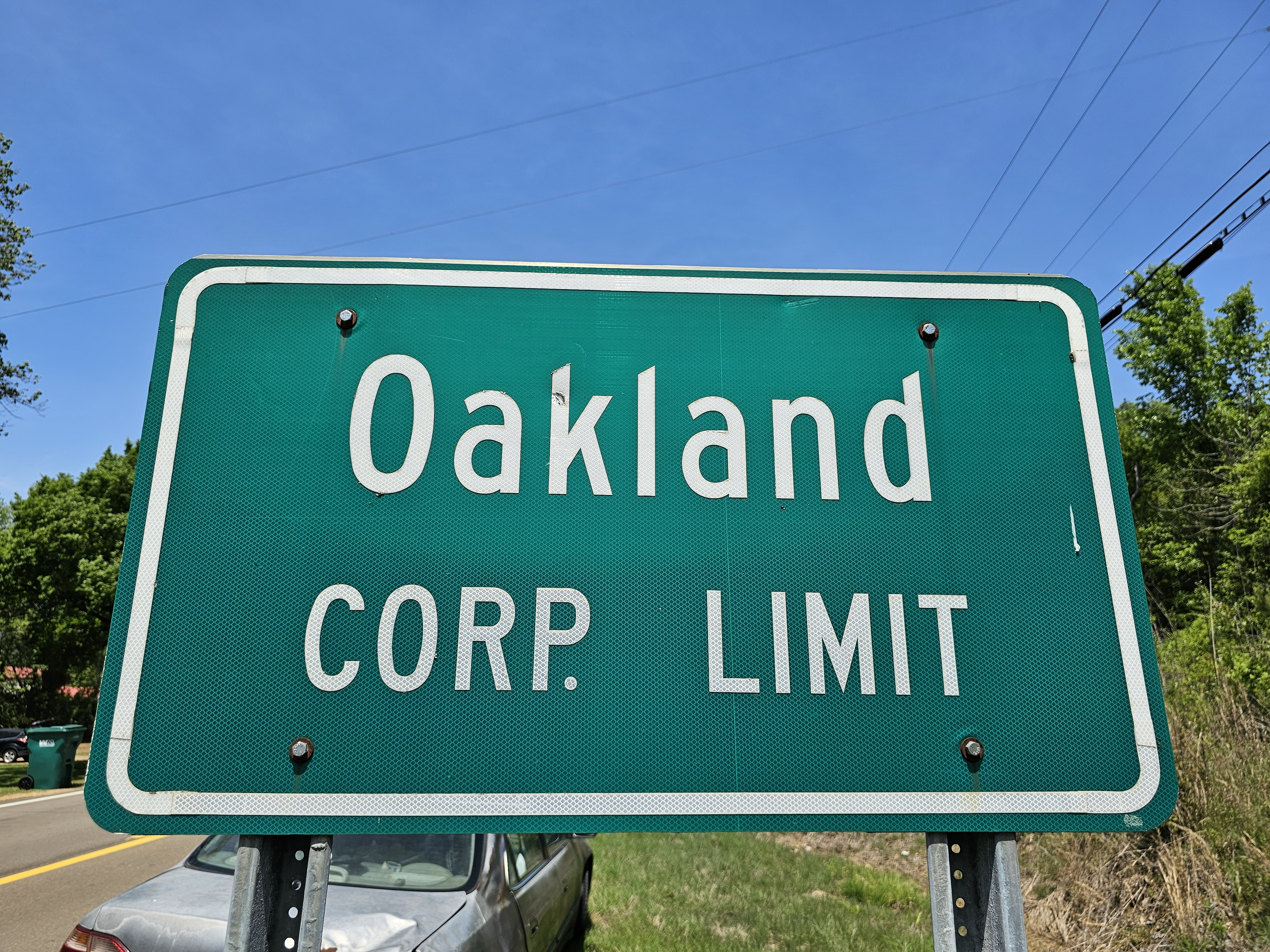

- Flag

- Location of Oakland, Mississippi

- Location in the United States
- Coordinates: 34°03′20″N 89°54′59″W
- Country: United States
- State: Mississippi
- County: Yalobusha

Area
  - Total: 1.53 sq mi (3.96 km^{2})
  - Land: 1.53 sq mi (3.96 km^{2})
  - Water: 0 sq mi (0.00 km^{2})
- Elevation: 351 ft (107 m)

Population (2020)
  - Total: 462
  - Density: 302.1/sq mi (116.66/km^{2})
- Time zone: UTC-6 (Central (CST))
  - Summer (DST): UTC-5 (CDT)
- ZIP code: 38948
- Area code: 662
- FIPS code: 28-53200
- GNIS feature ID: 675114

Oakland is a town in Yalobusha County, Mississippi, United States. As of the 2020 census, Oakland had a population of 462.

== History ==
Oakland was first settled around 1836, and was located 1.5 mi (2.4 km) east of its present location. The town moved when the Mississippi and Tennessee Railroad was built in the 1850s.

During the Civil War, the Battle of Oakland occurred on December 3, 1862, when Union Army General Cadwallader C. Washburn's 1,900 cavalrymen encountered Confederate Colonel John Summerfield Griffith's 6th Texas Cavalry Regiment at Oakland. Both sides withdrew after several hours of fighting.

In the early 1900s, the farms surrounding Oakland produced corn, cotton, vegetables and fruits, and "it is claimed that Oakland pears rival those of California". Oakland was prosperous, and "one of the best business towns of its size in the State", with two churches, a cotton gin, schools, merchants, and a bank, The Bank of Oakland.

== Geography ==
According to the United States Census Bureau, the town has a total area of 1.4 square miles (3.6 km^{2}), all land.

== Demographics ==
Historical population
Census	Pop.	Note	%±
1880	288		—
1890	327		13.5%
1900	209		−36.1%
1910	351		67.9%
1920	429		22.2%
1930	428		−0.2%
1940	516		20.6%
1950	551		6.8%
1960	488		−11.4%
1970	493		1.0%
1980	540		9.5%
1990	553		2.4%
2000	586		6.0%
2010	527		−10.1%
2020	462		−12.3%
U.S. Decennial Census

=== Racial and ethnic composition ===
Oakland town, Mississippi – Racial and ethnic composition Note: the US Census treats Hispanic/Latino as an ethnic category. This table excludes Latinos from the racial categories and assigns them to a separate category. Hispanics/Latinos may be of any race.
Race / Ethnicity (NH = Non-Hispanic)	Pop 2000	Pop 2010	Pop 2020	% 2000	% 2010	% 2020
White alone (NH)	137	121	119	23.38%	22.96%	25.76%
Black or African American alone (NH)	439	395	325	74.91%	74.95%	70.35%
Native American or Alaska Native alone (NH)	1	0	1	0.17%	0.00%	0.22%
Asian alone (NH)	0	0	0	0.00%	0.00%	0.00%
Native Hawaiian or Pacific Islander alone (NH)	0	0	0	0.00%	0.00%	0.00%
Other race alone (NH)	0	0	0	0.00%	0.00%	0.00%
Mixed race or Multiracial (NH)	1	1	10	0.17%	0.19%	2.16%
Hispanic or Latino (any race)	8	10	7	1.37%	1.90%	1.52%
Total	586	527	462	100.00%	100.00%	100.00%

=== 2020 census ===
As of the 2020 United States census, there were 462 people, 237 households, and 139 families residing in the town.

=== 2000 census ===
As of the census of 2000, there were 586 people, 222 households, and 132 families residing in the town. The population density was 409.3 inhabitants per square mile (158.0/km^{2}). There were 238 housing units at an average density of 166.2 per square mile (64.2/km^{2}). The racial makeup of the town was 23.72% White, 75.94% African American, 0.17% Native American, and 0.17% from two or more races. Hispanic or Latino of any race were 1.37% of the population.

There were 222 households, out of which 28.4% had children under the age of 18 living with them, 28.4% were married couples living together, 24.8% had a female householder with no husband present, and 40.1% were non-families. 36.5% of all households were made up of individuals, and 16.7% had someone living alone who was 65 years of age or older. The average household size was 2.64 and the average family size was 3.57.

In the town, the population was spread out, with 30.0% under the age of 18, 9.7% from 18 to 24, 29.2% from 25 to 44, 19.1% from 45 to 64, and 11.9% who were 65 years of age or older. The median age was 33 years. For every 100 females, there were 93.4 males. For every 100 females age 18 and over, there were 85.5 males.

The median income for a household in the town was $17,431, and the median income for a family was $19,286. Males had a median income of $27,222 versus $17,083 for females. The per capita income for the town was $7,898. About 49.2% of families and 53.7% of the population were below the poverty line, including 66.5% of those under age 18 and 58.1% of those age 65 or over.

== Education ==
The Town of Oakland is served by the Coffeeville School District.

The community college district for the county is Northwest Mississippi Community College. The Lafayette-Yalobusha Technical Center is in Oxford.

== Notable people ==
- Dunbar Rowland, attorney, archivist, and historian.
