= Community Relations Service =

US Federal agency

- Seal of the U.S. Department of Justice Community Relations Service

Agency overview
- Formed: July 2, 1964; 62 years ago
- Dissolved: September 30, 2025; 11 months ago
- Website: justice.gov/crs

The Community Relations Service (CRS) was part of the United States Department of Justice. The office was intended to act as a peacemaker "for community conflicts and tensions arising from differences of race, color, national origin, gender, gender identity, sexual orientation, religion and disability". It was created by the Civil Rights Act of 1964, and its mission was broadened by the Matthew Shepard and James Byrd Jr. Hate Crimes Prevention Act passed in 2009. Originally under the Department of Commerce, it was moved to the Department of Justice by order of President Lyndon B. Johnson.

It was "the only Federal agency dedicated to assist State and local units of government, private and public organizations, and community groups with preventing and resolving racial and ethnic tensions, incidents, and civil disorders, and in restoring racial stability and harmony" by employing conciliators.

The most recent director was Paul Monteiro, who was appointed by the Biden administration and sworn in on May 26, 2022. He resigned in April 2023.

In April 2025 the second Trump administration considered closing the Service. On September 30, 2025, it was shut down.
