= Water Valley, Mississippi =

- City
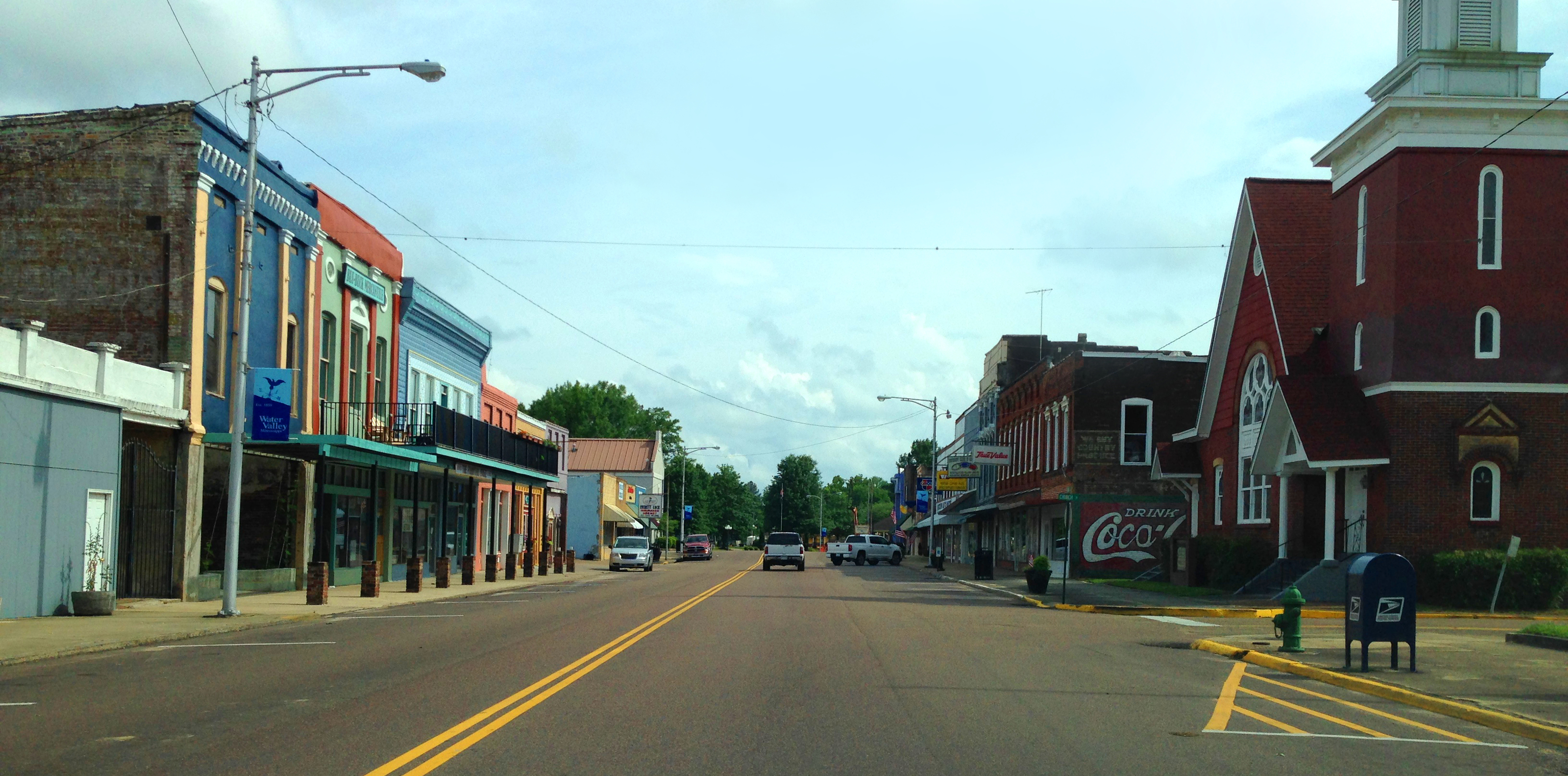
- Main Street in Water Valley is listed on the National Register of Historic Places

- Flag

- Location of Water Valley, Mississippi

- Location in the United States
- Coordinates: 34°9′13″N 89°37′52″W
- Country: United States
- State: Mississippi
- County: Yalobusha

Area
  - Total: 7.01 sq mi (18.16 km^{2})
  - Land: 7.01 sq mi (18.15 km^{2})
  - Water: 0 sq mi (0.00 km^{2})
- Elevation: 292 ft (89 m)

Population (2020)
  - Total: 3,380
  - Density: 482.2/sq mi (186.19/km^{2})
- Time zone: UTC-6 (Central (CST))
  - Summer (DST): UTC-5 (CDT)
- ZIP code: 38965
- Area code: 662
- FIPS code: 28-78000
- GNIS feature ID: 0679365
- Website: watervalleyms.gov

Water Valley is a city in Yalobusha County, Mississippi. As of the 2020 census, Water Valley had a population of 3,380. It is the larger of two county seats in the rural county and at one time was the center of railroad shops. Water Valley is served by the Water Valley School District.

== Geography ==
According to the United States Census Bureau, the city has a total area of 7.0 square miles (18 km^{2}), all land.

Climate data for Water Valley, Mississippi (1991–2020 normals, extremes 1900–2020)
| Month | Jan | Feb | Mar | Apr | May | Jun | Jul | Aug | Sep | Oct | Nov | Dec | Year |
|---|---|---|---|---|---|---|---|---|---|---|---|---|---|
| Record high °F (°C) | 82 (28) | 83 (28) | 91 (33) | 94 (34) | 98 (37) | 107 (42) | 109 (43) | 107 (42) | 110 (43) | 98 (37) | 89 (32) | 81 (27) | 110 (43) |
| Mean daily maximum °F (°C) | 52.6 (11.4) | 57.4 (14.1) | 66.2 (19.0) | 74.2 (23.4) | 81.6 (27.6) | 88.2 (31.2) | 90.4 (32.4) | 91.2 (32.9) | 86.2 (30.1) | 76.0 (24.4) | 64.2 (17.9) | 55.2 (12.9) | 73.6 (23.1) |
| Daily mean °F (°C) | 41.2 (5.1) | 44.8 (7.1) | 53.1 (11.7) | 60.9 (16.1) | 69.6 (20.9) | 77.2 (25.1) | 80.0 (26.7) | 79.8 (26.6) | 73.7 (23.2) | 62.6 (17.0) | 51.3 (10.7) | 43.9 (6.6) | 61.5 (16.4) |
| Mean daily minimum °F (°C) | 29.7 (−1.3) | 32.1 (0.1) | 40.0 (4.4) | 47.6 (8.7) | 57.6 (14.2) | 66.2 (19.0) | 69.6 (20.9) | 68.4 (20.2) | 61.3 (16.3) | 49.1 (9.5) | 38.3 (3.5) | 32.6 (0.3) | 49.4 (9.7) |
| Record low °F (°C) | −10 (−23) | −13 (−25) | 9 (−13) | 24 (−4) | 33 (1) | 45 (7) | 50 (10) | 49 (9) | 33 (1) | 24 (−4) | 12 (−11) | −4 (−20) | −13 (−25) |
| Average precipitation inches (mm) | 5.32 (135) | 5.14 (131) | 5.32 (135) | 6.31 (160) | 5.08 (129) | 5.12 (130) | 4.88 (124) | 3.96 (101) | 3.55 (90) | 3.66 (93) | 4.56 (116) | 5.67 (144) | 58.57 (1,488) |
| Average snowfall inches (cm) | 0.8 (2.0) | 0.3 (0.76) | 0.0 (0.0) | 0.0 (0.0) | 0.0 (0.0) | 0.0 (0.0) | 0.0 (0.0) | 0.0 (0.0) | 0.0 (0.0) | 0.0 (0.0) | 0.0 (0.0) | 0.1 (0.25) | 1.2 (3.0) |
| Average precipitation days (≥ 0.01 in) | 9.2 | 8.4 | 9.5 | 8.5 | 8.8 | 8.0 | 8.0 | 6.8 | 5.6 | 6.1 | 7.7 | 9.2 | 95.8 |
| Average snowy days (≥ 0.1 in) | 0.5 | 0.3 | 0.0 | 0.0 | 0.0 | 0.0 | 0.0 | 0.0 | 0.0 | 0.0 | 0.0 | 0.2 | 1.0 |
Source: NOAA

== Demographics ==
Historical population
| Census | Pop. | Note | %± |
|---|---|---|---|
| 1880 | 2,220 | | — |
| 1890 | 2,832 | | 27.6% |
| 1900 | 3,813 | | 34.6% |
| 1910 | 4,275 | | 12.1% |
| 1920 | 4,315 | | 0.9% |
| 1930 | 3,738 | | −13.4% |
| 1940 | 3,340 | | −10.6% |
| 1950 | 3,213 | | −3.8% |
| 1960 | 3,206 | | −0.2% |
| 1970 | 3,285 | | 2.5% |
| 1980 | 4,146 | | 26.2% |
| 1990 | 3,610 | | −12.9% |
| 2000 | 3,677 | | 1.9% |
| 2010 | 3,392 | | −7.8% |
| 2020 | 3,380 | | −0.4% |
U.S. Decennial Census

=== 2020 census ===
As of the 2020 census, Water Valley had a population of 3,380. There were 1,440 households, including 818 families. The median age was 42.4 years. 21.6% of residents were under the age of 18 and 23.6% of residents were 65 years of age or older. For every 100 females there were 90.0 males, and for every 100 females age 18 and over there were 86.4 males age 18 and over.

0.0% of residents lived in urban areas, while 100.0% lived in rural areas.

Of all households, 28.0% had children under the age of 18 living in them. 30.6% were married-couple households, 20.2% were households with a male householder and no spouse or partner present, and 43.2% were households with a female householder and no spouse or partner present. About 38.7% of all households were made up of individuals and 16.6% had someone living alone who was 65 years of age or older.

There were 1,639 housing units, of which 12.1% were vacant. The homeowner vacancy rate was 3.3% and the rental vacancy rate was 10.2%.

Racial composition as of the 2020 census
| Race | Number | Percent |
|---|---|---|
| White | 1,787 | 52.9% |
| Black or African American | 1,449 | 42.9% |
| American Indian and Alaska Native | 1 | 0.0% |
| Asian | 11 | 0.3% |
| Native Hawaiian and Other Pacific Islander | 2 | 0.1% |
| Some other race | 34 | 1.0% |
| Two or more races | 96 | 2.8% |
| Hispanic or Latino (of any race) | 39 | 1.2% |

=== 2000 census ===
At the 2000 census there were 3,677 people in 1,470 households, including 961 families, in the city. The population density was 523.2 inhabitants per square mile (202.0/km^{2}). There were 1,675 housing units at an average density of 238.3 per square mile (92.0/km^{2}). The racial makeup of the city was 57.87% White, 40.74% African American, 0.33% Native American, 0.16% Asian, 0.22% Pacific Islander, 0.19% from other races, and 0.49% from two or more races. Hispanic or Latino of any race were 1.20%.

Of the 1,470 households 30.0% had children under the age of 18 living with them, 39.0% were married couples living together, 23.2% had a female householder with no husband present, and 34.6% were non-families. 31.8% of households were one person and 16.2% were one person aged 65 or older. The average household size was 2.43 and the average family size was 3.07. The age distribution was 26.5% under the age of 18, 8.9% from 18 to 24, 26.2% from 25 to 44, 21.1% from 45 to 64, and 17.3% 65 or older. The median age was 37 years. For every 100 females, there were 81.3 males. For every 100 females age 18 and over, there were 74.3 males.

The median household income was $23,777 and the median family income was $31,083. Males had a median income of $26,888 versus $20,127 for females. The per capita income for the city was $13,324. About 23.7% of families and 26.9% of the population were below the poverty line, including 37.5% of those under age 18 and 15.9% of those age 65 or over.

== Education ==
It is in the Water Valley School District.

The community college district for the county is Northwest Mississippi Community College. The Lafayette-Yalobusha Technical Center is in Oxford.

== Notable people ==
- Hubert Creekmore (1907–1966), author
- James A. Ford (1911–1968), archaeologist
- Lloyd L. Gaines, plaintiff in Missouri ex rel. Gaines v. Canada
- Kevin Horan, attorney and member of the Mississippi House of Representatives
- Casey Jones (1864–1900), railroad engineer
- John William Meece, (1843–1924), member of the Mississippi Legislature in 1911
- Bryant Mix (born 1974), NFL player
- Ray Terrell (1919–1997), World War II veteran and professional football player
