= Mississippi Highway 9 =

Highway in Mississippi

Mississippi Highway 9
- Signed portion of MS 9 in red, unsigned spurs of MS 9 in blue

Route information
- Maintained by MDOT
- Length: 115.9 mi (186.5 km) (107.511 mi excluding concurrencies)
- Existed: 1932–present

Major junctions
- South end: MS 12 in Ackerman
- US 82 in Eupora; US 278 / MS 6 in Pontotoc; I-22 / US 78 in Sherman
- North end: MS 30 east of New Albany

Location
- Country: United States
- State: Mississippi
- Counties: Choctaw, Webster, Calhoun, Pontotoc, Union

Highway system
- Mississippi State Highway System; Interstate; US; State
← MS 8	→ MS 9W

Mississippi Highway 9 (MS 9) in the Appalachian Foothills (a.k.a. North Central Hills) region of northeastern Mississippi, running north–south from MS 30 east of New Albany to MS 12 in Ackerman. It runs approximately 116 miles (187 km), serving Choctaw, Webster, Calhoun, Pontotoc, and Union counties. MS 9W veers off to the left in a curve just about 2 miles north of Bruce. It goes north north-west until it merges with MS 7 just south of Oxford.

== Route description ==
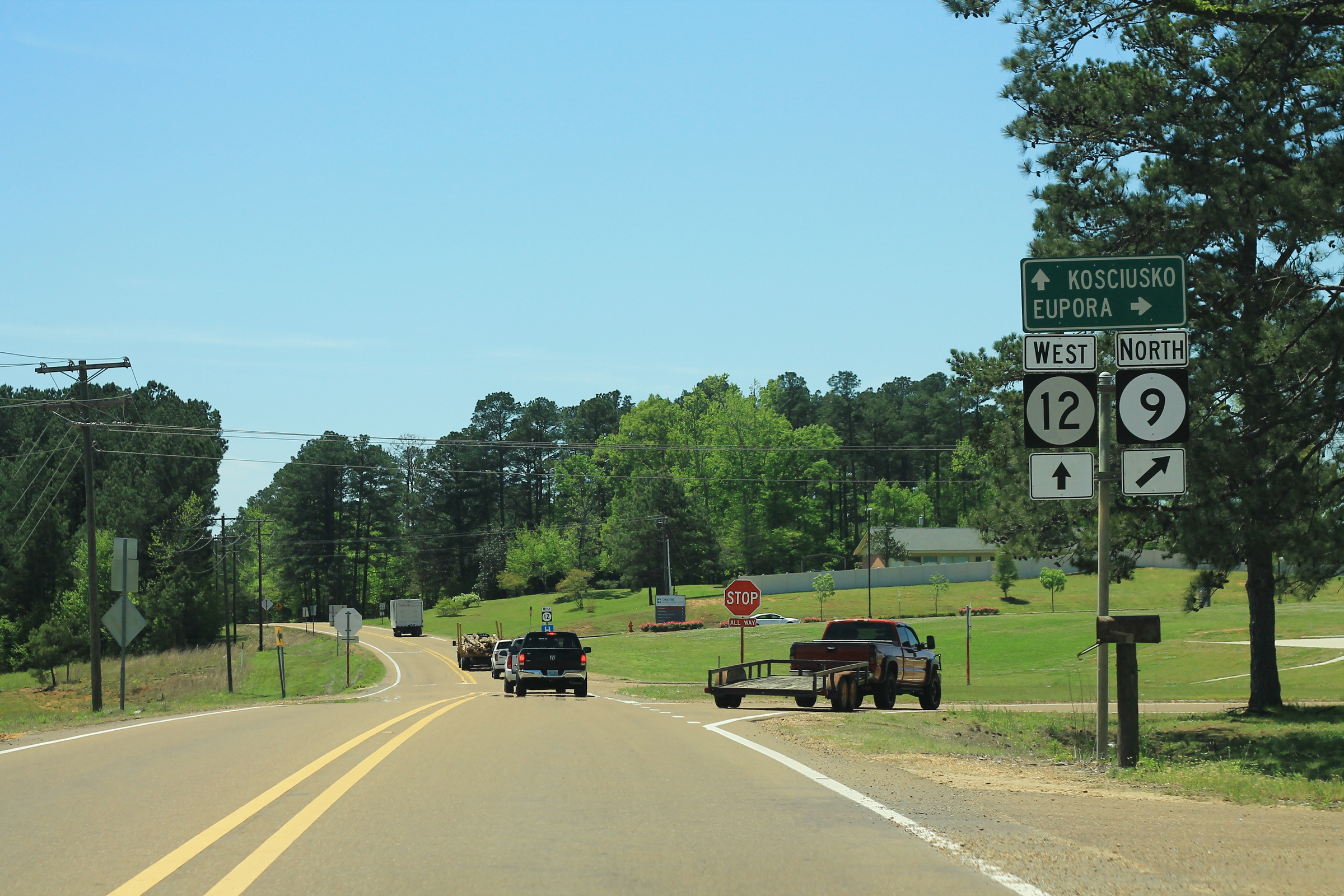
Southern terminus of MS 9 at MS 12 in Ackerman

MS 9 begins in Choctaw County in Ackerman at an intersection with MS 12 just north of downtown. It heads north as a two-lane highway to leave Ackerman and pass through mostly woodlands, where it has intersections with MS 415 and MS 790, before passing by the TVA Ackerman Combined Cycle Plant (along with the Red Hills Power Plant and Mine). The highway passes through the community of Bywy, where it has an interchange with the Natchez Trace Parkway, before passing through a mix of farmland and wooded areas for several miles to cross the Big Black River into Webster County.

MS 9 immediately enters Eupora and has an interchange with US 82 before passing through a business district and neighborhoods to have an intersection with MS 182 in downtown. The highway passes north through more neighborhoods to pass by Whites Creek Lake before leaving Eupora and passing through rural areas for several miles. MS 9 travels through the village of Walthall, where it has an intersections with the MS 784 loop as well as MS 50, before traveling northwest through the community of Bellefontaine, where it has an intersection with MS 404, with MS 9 entering Calhoun County shortly thereafter.

MS 9 immediately passes through the village of Slate Springs before curving back to the northeast. It heads through flatlands for several miles to become concurrent with MS 8, as well as crossing Topashaw Creek and the Yalobusha River, before entering Calhoun City. The two highways split at a Traffic Circle in the center of town, with MS 8 splitting off along Veterans Avenue, and MS 9 continues north along Main Street to pass through some neighborhoods before leaving Calhoun City and winding its way through hilly terrain to travel through the village of Pittsboro before crossing the Skuna River into Bruce. MS 9 travels through industrial areas for a couple of miles before having an intersection with MS 32 in downtown. The highway now passes through some neighborhoods before leaving Bruce and having a Y-Intersection with MS 9W just north of town. MS 9 winds its way northward through a mix hilly terrain and flat farmland for several miles, where it has an intersection with MS 331, before passing through the community of Sarepta and crossing into Pontotoc County.

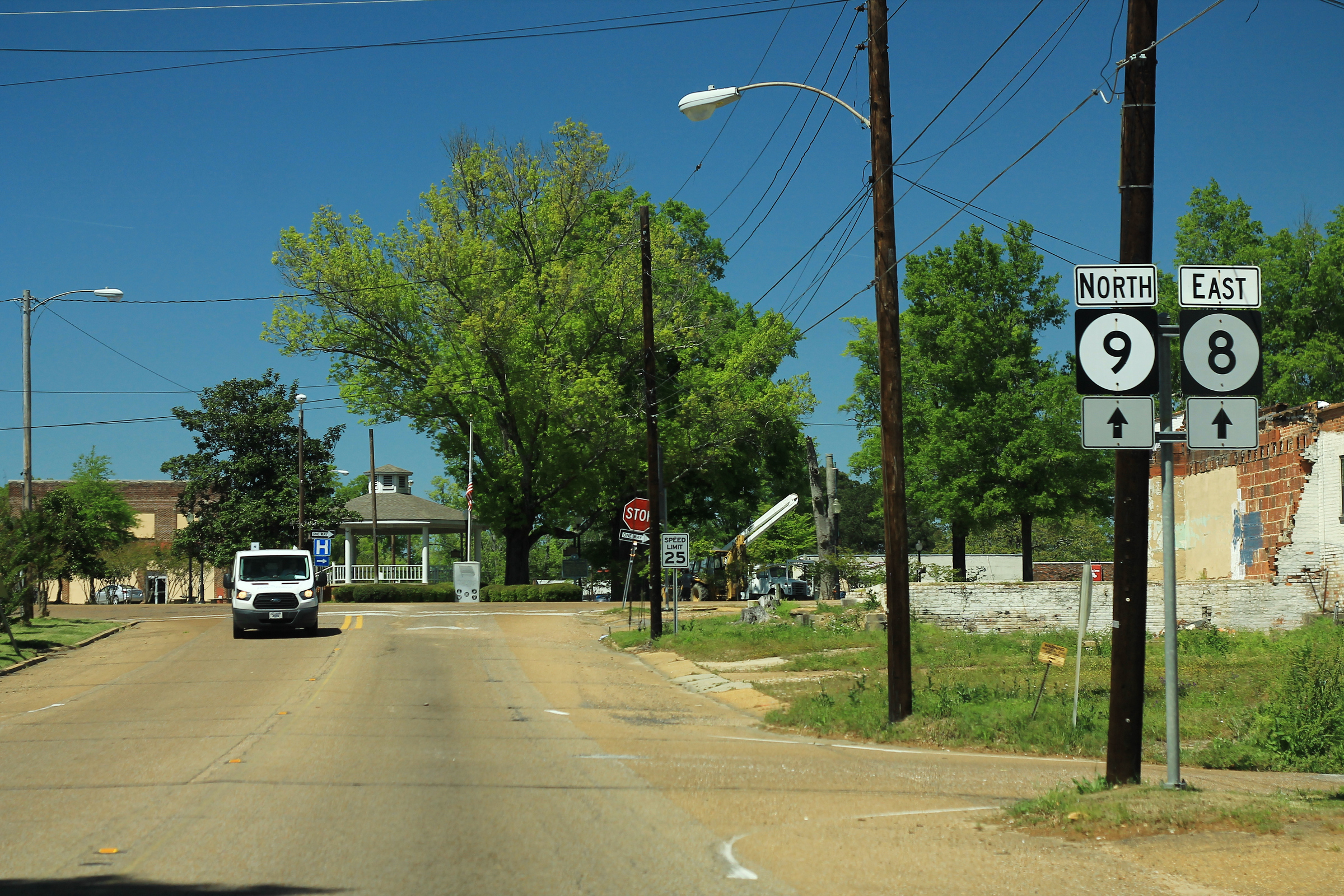
MS 8 and MS 9 traffic circle in Calhoun City

MS 9 curves to the northeast again as it travels through the communities of Randolph and Springville, where it has an intersection with MS 334, before passing through farmland, where it has an intersection with MS 341. The highway now enters Pontotoc and passes through neighborhoods, where it has an intersection with unsigned MS 770 (Spur Street) and becomes concurrent with MS 338 (W Oxford Street), before entering a business district. MS 9 has intersections with MS 15 and MS 336 (Turnpike Road) as it bypasses downtown along it western and northern sides. The highway now travels through neighborhoods, where it splits from MS 338 (E Oxford Street) and turns north along N Main Street at an intersection with MS 41 (N Main Street), before having an intersection with MS 345 (N Main Street) and passing through more rural areas. MS 9 leaves Pontotoc at an interchange with US 278/MS 6, where it widens to a four-lane divided expressway, and heads northeast through hilly areas to travel through the community of Endville. The highway enters Sherman after an intersection with Magnolia Way (unsigned MS 780), with the expressway end at an interchange with I-22/US 78 (Exit 76). The road continues into downtown Sherman as 3rd Avenue while MS 9 heads west along I-22/US 78 to cross into Union County.

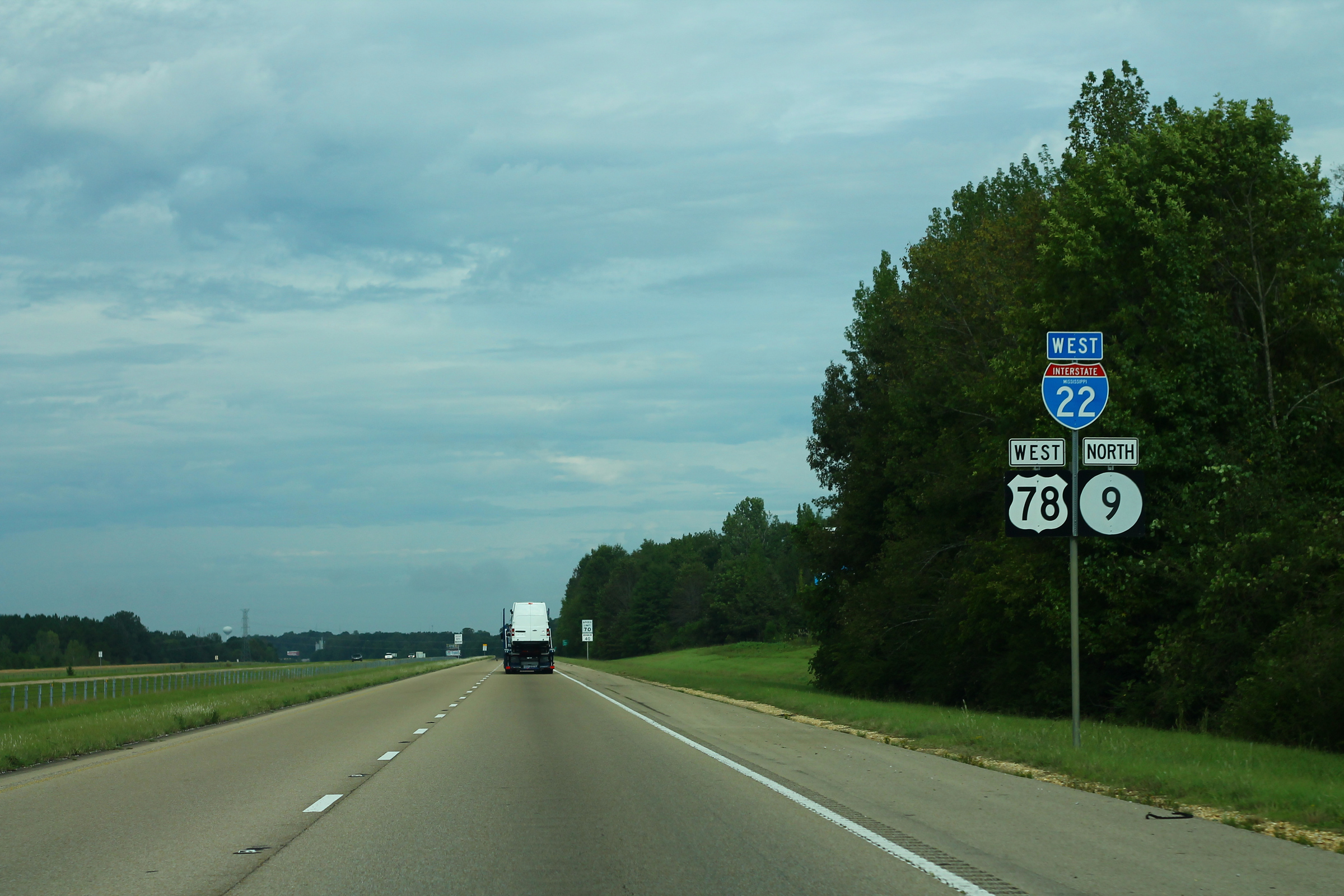
I-22/US 78/MS 9 concurrency between Sherman and Blue Springs

MS 9 splits off the interstate at Exit 73B, near Toyota Motor Manufacturing Mississippi, heading north as a two-lane to immediately have an intersection with MS 178 before entering Blue Springs. The highway winds its way through town along Main Street, where it has an intersection with County Road 278 (CR 278, unsigned MS 764). MS 9 leaves Blue Springs and passes through hilly terrain for a few miles to enter farmland, where it has a long concurrency with MS 348 between the communities of Ellistown and Branyan. The highway travels through the community of Alpine before re-entering hilly terrain to have a junction with MS 370 before MS 9 comes to an end at an intersection with MS 30 at the community of Graham.

== Major intersections ==
County	Location	mi	km	Destinations	Notes
Choctaw	Ackerman	0.0	0.0	MS 12 – Ackerman, Kosciusko	Southern terminus
Choctaw		1.3	2.1	MS 415 north – Chester	Southern terminus of MS 415
Choctaw		3.7– 3.8	6.0– 6.1	MS 790 east (Y Road) to MS 15	Western terminus of MS 790
Choctaw	Bywy	9.4	15.1	Natchez Trace Parkway	Interchange
Webster	Eupora	15.8– 15.9	25.4– 25.6	US 82 – Winona, Starkville	Interchange
Webster	Eupora	17.0	27.4	MS 182 – Downtown Eupora	
Webster	Walthall	21.4	34.4	MS 784 north (Main Street)	Southern terminus of MS 784
Webster	Walthall	21.6	34.8	MS 50 east (Avent Road)	Western terminus of MS 50
Webster	Walthall	21.9	35.2	MS 784 south (Hays Road)	Northern terminus of MS 784
Webster	Bellefontaine	25.3	40.7	MS 404 west – Cadaretta	Eastern terminus of MS 404
Calhoun		38.0	61.2	MS 8 west – Grenada	South end of MS 8 overlap
Calhoun	Calhoun City	42.0	67.6	MS 8 east (E Veterans Avenue) – Vardaman, Houston; W Veterans Avenue - Big Creek	North end of MS 8 overlap; traffic circle around city park; W Veterans Avenue is Old Highway 8
Calhoun	Bruce	52.1	83.8	MS 32 – Water Valley, Houlka, Downtown Bruce	
Calhoun		54.1	87.1	MS 9W north – Oxford	Southern terminus of MS 9W
Calhoun		59.8	96.2	MS 331 north – Tula	Southern terminus of MS 331
Pontotoc	Springville	76.8	123.6	MS 334 west – Toccopola, Camp Yocona, South Pontotoc High School	Eastern terminus of MS 334
Pontotoc		80.3	129.2	MS 341 south	Northern terminus of MS 341
Pontotoc	Pontotoc	81.9	131.8	MS 338 west (W Oxford Street) – Oxford, Houston; MS 770 east (Spur Street)	South end of MS 338 overlap; western terminus of unsigned MS 770
Pontotoc	Pontotoc	82.2	132.3	MS 15 – New Albany, Houston, Ecru, truck route to MS 9 north	
Pontotoc	Pontotoc	82.6	132.9	MS 336 west (Turnpike Road) – New Albany	Eastern terminus of MS 336
Pontotoc	Pontotoc	83.3	134.1	MS 41 south (N Main Street) / MS 338 east (E Oxford Street) – Okolona, Tupelo	Northern terminus of MS 41; north end of MS 338 overlap
Pontotoc	Pontotoc	83.6	134.5	MS 345 north (N Main Street) – Harmony, Ecru	Southern terminus of MS 345
Pontotoc		86.4– 86.7	139.0– 139.5	US 278 / MS 6 (Pontotoc Parkway) – Oxford, Tupelo, trucks to MS 9 south / MS 15 south / MS 41 south	Interchange
Pontotoc		93.0– 93.2	149.7– 150.0	Endville Road - Endville, Chesterville	Interchange
Pontotoc		96.2	154.8	Magnolia Way (MS 780 west) - trucks to Toyota plant	Eastern terminus of MS 780
Pontotoc	Sherman	96.3	155.0	I-22 east / US 78 east – Tupelo; 3rd Avenue - Sherman	South end of I-22 / US 78 overlap; MS 9 south follows exit 76; road continues north as 3rd Avenue
Union		99.5	160.1	I-22 west / US 78 west / to Magnolia Way – Memphis	North end of I-22 / US 78 overlap; MS 9 north follows exit 73B
Union		100.3	161.4	MS 178 – Sherman, New Albany	
Union	Blue Springs	101.8	163.8	CR 278 (Main Street/MS 764 west)	Eastern terminus of unsigned MS 764
Union	Ellistown	105.9	170.4	MS 348 west / CR 185 north – New Albany	South end of MS 348 overlap
Union	Branyan	108.4	174.5	MS 348 east – Guntown	North end of MS 348 overlap
Union		114.6	184.4	MS 370 east – Jericho, Baldwyn	Western terminus of southern segment of MS 370
Union	Graham	115.9	186.5	MS 30 to MS 370 – New Albany, Booneville	Northern terminus
1.000 mi = 1.609 km; 1.000 km = 0.621 mi: Concurrency terminus
