= Mississippi Highway 30 =

Highway in Mississippi

Mississippi Highway 30
- MS 30 in red, unsigned extensions near New Albany and Wheeler in blue

Route information
- Maintained by MDOT
- Length: 91.1 mi (146.6 km) (78.968 mi excluding concurrencies)
- Existed: 1932–present

Major junctions
- West end: Lamar Blvd. / Molly Barr Rd. in Oxford
- MS 7 in Oxford; I-22 / US 78 in New Albany; US 45 from Wheeler to Booneville
- East end: Natchez Trace Parkway in Mingo

Location
- Country: United States
- State: Mississippi
- Counties: Lafayette, Union, Prentiss, Tishomingo

Highway system
- Mississippi State Highway System; Interstate; US; State
| ← MS 29 | → MS 32 |

Mississippi Highway 30 (MS 30) is an American state highway that runs across the North Central Hills of the Appalachian Mountains in northeast Mississippi. It travels east–west for 91.1 miles (146.6 km) from MS 7 at Oxford, Mississippi to the Natchez Trace Parkway in Mingo near the Alabama state line.

== Route description ==
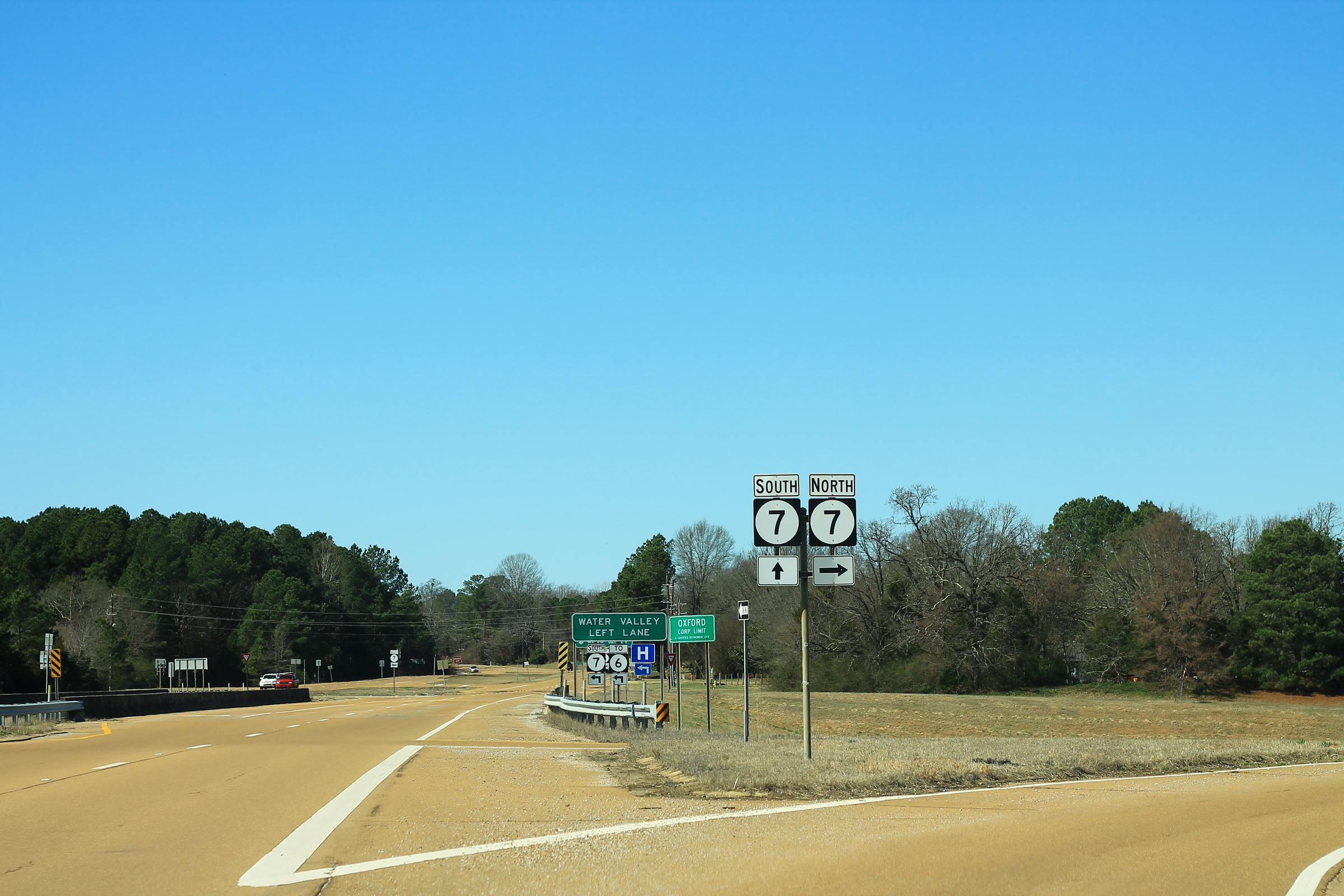
Signs at the interchange with MS 7

MS 30 begins in Lafayette County in Oxford at an interchange with MS 7 in the northern part of town. It heads east briefly as a four-lane divided highway through a business district before narrowing to two-lanes and passing through neighborhoods for several blocks. The highway now leaves Oxford and passes through farmland for a couple miles before entering the Holly Springs National Forest, where it travels through remote woodlands (passing by Puskus Lake Recreation Area) as it crosses into Union County.

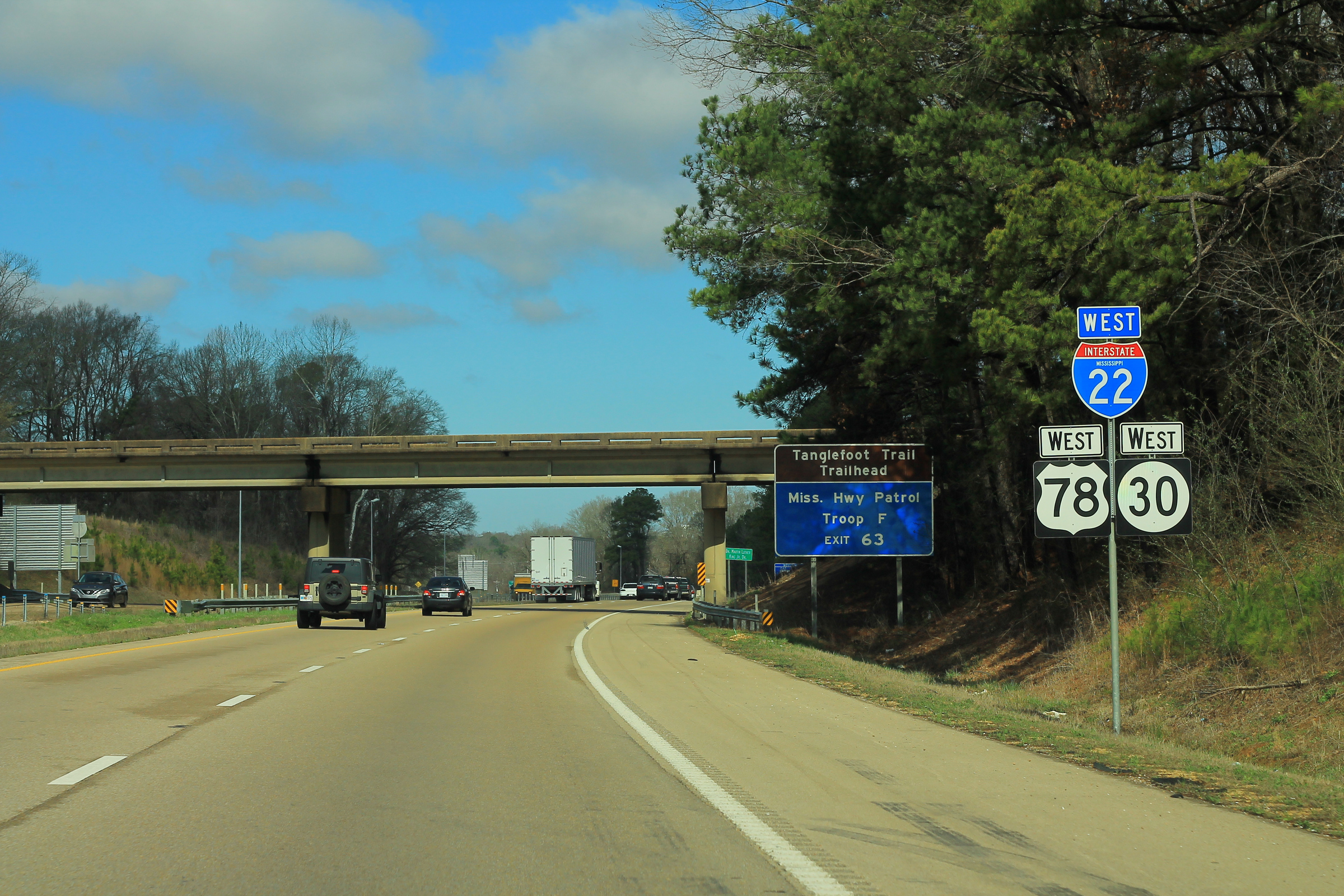
MS 30 along its concurrency with I-22/US 78 in New Albany

MS 30 exits the National Forest and travels eastward through farmland for several miles, where it passes through Etta (where it has an intersection with MS 355 and crosses the Tallahatchie River), before having an intersection with MS 349 and passing through the communities of Enterprise and Poolville. The highway enters the New Albany city limits and passes through an industrial area before some neighborhoods and business district at an interchange with I-22/US 78 (Exit 61), where MS 30 becomes concurrent (overlapped) with the Interstate. MS 30 heads east along four-lane I-22/US 78 east for a few miles to cross the Tallahatchie River for a second time immediately before Exit 63 (Carter Avenue/Central Avenue/Bratton Road; signed as Downtown New Albany). The freeway now reaches Exit 64, where MS 30 splits off and follows four-lane MS 15 north through the eastern side of town, where they have intersections with both MS 178 and MS 348, before MS 30 splits off and heads east through neighborhoods as a two-lane. MS 30 leaves New Albany and travels northeast through wooded and hilly terrain for the next several miles as it passes through Keownville, Pleasant Ridge (where it has an intersection with MS 370), and Graham (where it has an intersection with MS 9) before crossing into Prentiss County.

MS 30 passes through Geeville as it travels through farmland for a few miles to an interchange with US 45 in Wheeler, which MS 30 becomes concurrent with and they head north as a four-lane expressway for several miles to Booneville, where MS 30 splits off and heads east along a two-lane expressway on the southern outskirts of town, having an interchanges with MS 145 and MS 4, as well as having an intersection with MS 364 before leaving the Booneville area and winding its way through hilly woodlands for the next several miles, where it has an intersection with MS 365 in Burton before entering Tishomingo County.

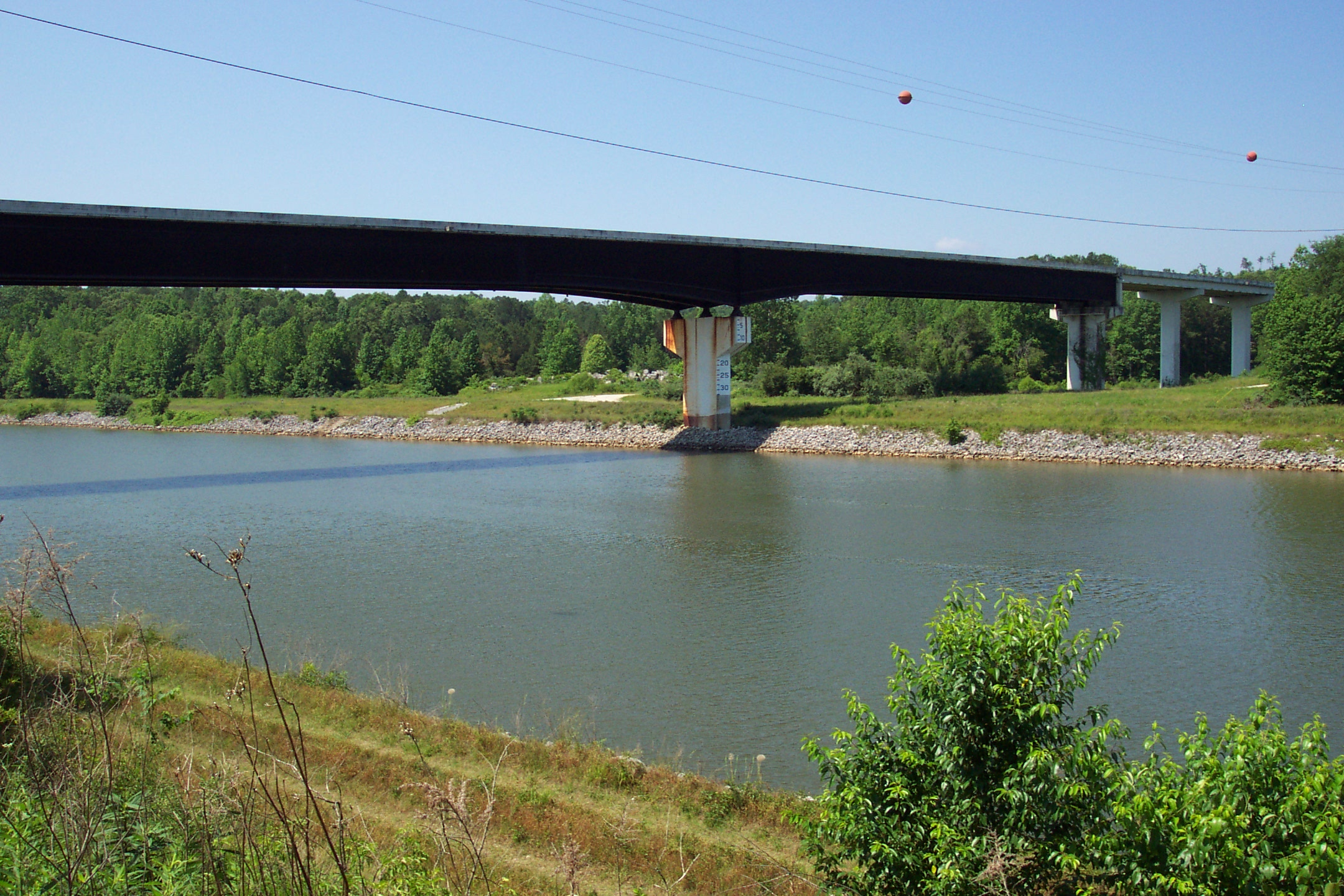
Mississippi Highway 30 bridge passing over the Tennessee-Tombigbee Waterway in Paden

MS 30 travels through more hilly woodlands to cross the Tennessee Tombigbee Waterway and pass through Paden before having an intersection with MS 25 in the northern part of the town of Tishomingo. The highway passes through more hilly for a few more miles before coming to an end at an interchange with the Natchez Trace Parkway at the community of Mingo, with the road continuing south as County Road 85 (CR 85) towards Bloody Springs and the Alabama state line.

== Major intersections ==
| County | Location | mi | km | Destinations | Notes |
|---|---|---|---|---|---|
| Lafayette | Oxford | 0.0 | 0.0 | MS 7 to I-55 / MS 6 / US 278 – Holly Springs, Water Valley, Batesville; Molly Barr Road – University-Oxford Airport | Interchange; Western terminus |
| Lafayette | Holly Springs National Forest | 8.8 | 14.2 | Road 2089 – Puskus Lake Recreation Area | Access road into park |
| Union | | 17.6 | 28.3 | MS 355 south – Etta | Northern terminus of MS 355 |
| Union | | 18.8 | 30.3 | MS 349 north – Macedonia, Cornersville, Potts Camp | Southern terminus of MS 349 |
| Union | New Albany | 30.0 | 48.3 | I-22 west / US 78 west – Memphis Highway 30 W to MS 178 – Museum | Western end of I-22 / US 78 overlap; MS 30 west follows exit 61 |
| Union | New Albany | 31.2– 31.7 | 50.2– 51.0 | Downtown New Albany | I-22 exit 63 |
| Union | New Albany | 32.2 | 51.8 | I-22 east / US 78 east – Tupelo MS 15 south – Pontotoc | Eastern end of I-22 / US 78 overlap; western end of MS 15 overlap; MS 30 east follows exit 64 |
| Union | New Albany | 33.4 | 53.8 | MS 178 (E Bankhead Street) – Myrtle, Downtown New Albany, Blue Springs, Sherman | |
| Union | New Albany | 33.6 | 54.1 | MS 348 east (Center Street) – Center, Ellistown | Western terminus of MS 348 |
| Union | New Albany | 34.1 | 54.9 | MS 15 north – Ripley, Union County Museum, Northeast Mississippi Community College | Eastern end of MS 15 overlap |
| Union | Pleasant Ridge | 46.2 | 74.4 | MS 370 west | Eastern terminus of MS 370 |
| Union | Graham | 49.0 | 78.9 | MS 9 south to MS 370 – Sherman, Alpine | Northern terminus of MS 9 |
| Prentiss | Wheeler | 58.6– 58.8 | 94.3– 94.6 | US 45 south – Tupelo Old Mississippi 30 to MS 145 – Wheeler | Interchange; western end of US 45 overlap |
| Prentiss | Booneville | 62.8 | 101.1 | US 45 north – Corinth | Interchange; eastern end of US 45 overlap |
| Prentiss | Booneville | 63.7– 63.9 | 102.5– 102.8 | MS 145 – Booneville | Interchange |
| Prentiss | | 68.2– 68.4 | 109.8– 110.1 | MS 4 – East Booneville | Interchange |
| Prentiss | | 69.9 | 112.5 | MS 364 east | Western terminus of MS 364 |
| Prentiss | Burton | 79.8 | 128.4 | MS 365 north – Cairo, Burnsville | Southern terminus of MS 365 |
| Tishomingo | Paden | 84.2 | 135.5 | Mississippi Avenue (MS 793 north) – Paden; Crows Neck Road – Crows Neck Paden Overlook (Paden Overlook Area) | Southern terminus of unsigned MS 793 |
| Tishomingo | Tishomingo | 86.2 | 138.7 | MS 25 – Iuka, Tishomingo, Tishomingo State Park | |
| Tishomingo | Mingo | 91.1 | 146.6 | Natchez Trace Parkway; CR 85 – Bloody Springs | Interchange; eastern terminus |
1.000 mi = 1.609 km; 1.000 km = 0.621 mi: Concurrency terminus
