= Albert C. Anderson =

American politician (1878–1954)

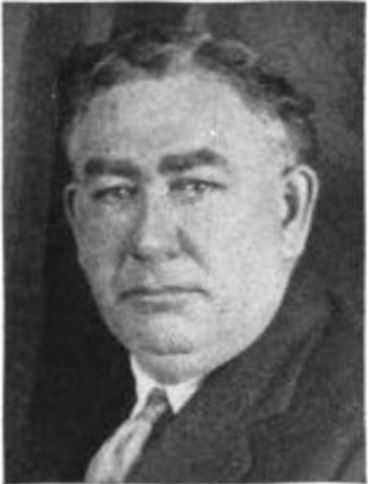
- c. 1924

President pro tempore of the Mississippi State Senate
- In office January 2, 1912 – January 1916
- Preceded by: John L. Hebron Jr.
- Succeeded by: Carroll Kendrick

Member of the Mississippi State Senate from the 36th district
- In office January 2, 1912 – January 1916 Serving with B. A. Tucker Jr. John M. Eddins
- Preceded by: W. J. East; Hugh K. Mahon; S. Joe Owen
- Succeeded by: William H. Dyson; Sam Mims Jr. Henry Clay Collins

Member of the Mississippi House of Representatives from the Tippah and Benton Counties district Tippah County (1900–1904)
- In office January 1924 – January 1928
- In office January 1908 – January 1912
- In office January 1900 – January 1904

Personal details
- Born: February 7, 1878 Dumas, Mississippi, U.S.
- Died: June 24, 1954 (aged 76) Ripley, Mississippi, U.S.
- Party: Democratic
- Children: 4

Albert Clarence Anderson (February 7, 1878 – June 24, 1954) was an American politician and newspaper publisher. He represented the 36th district in the Mississippi State Senate from 1912 to 1916, and was the Senate's President Pro Tempore during that term. He also served in the Mississippi House of Representatives from 1900 to 1904, from 1908 to 1912, and from 1924 to 1928.

== Biography ==
Albert Clarence Anderson was born on February 7, 1878, in Dumas, Mississippi. He was the son of William Walter Anderson, a farmer, and his wife, Mary Elizabeth (Shackelford) Anderson. He grew up on his family farm in Dumas and attended the public schools of Tippah County.

== Political career ==
=== 1899-1907 ===
Anderson was a Delegate to the Mississippi State Democratic Conventions in 1899 and 1904. In 1899, Anderson was elected to represent Tippah County as a Democrat in the Mississippi House of Representatives for the term spanning from 1900 to 1904. During this term, Anderson was a member of the House's Military Affairs and Corporations committees. In November 1903, Anderson purchased the Southern Sentinel newspaper and moved from Dumas to Ripley, Mississippi. In 1905, Anderson was sent by the Mississippi State Cotton Association to the National Meeting in New Orleans, Louisiana. In 1907, Anderson was the local Farmers' Union delegate to the state meeting in Jackson, Mississippi. In that same year, Anderson represented his congressional district at a Waterways Convention in Memphis, Tennessee.

=== 1908-1916 ===
On November 5, 1907, Anderson was elected to represent Tippah and Benton Counties in the House for the term spanning from 1908 to 1912. During this term, Anderson was the Chairman of the House's Liquor Traffic Committee and also served on the following committees: Public Printing, Constitution, Penitentiary, and Agriculture.

On November 7, 1911, Anderson was elected to the Mississippi State Senate, representing the 36th District (comprising Union, Tippah, Marshall, Benton, and Tate Counties), for the term spanning from 1912 to 1916. At the beginning of the term on January 2, 1912, Anderson was elected president pro tempore of the senate, defeating two other candidates in the election. In 1912, Anderson was a delegate to the Democratic National Convention in Baltimore.

=== 1917-1927 ===
In 1920, Anderson ran to represent Mississippi's 2nd Congressional District in the United States House of Representatives. In 1922, Anderson ran again for Congress, and received an endorsement from former legislative colleague and State Senate president pro tempore Carroll Kendrick.

In 1923, Anderson was re-elected to the House, and served a third term there (representing Tippah and Benton Counties) spanning from 1924 to 1928. During this term, Anderson led the passage of a $2.5 million appropriation to create a new "hospital for the insane" in Jackson. In 1926, Anderson strongly advocated a law prohibiting the teaching of evolution, which passed.

Anderson was a delegate to the 1924 Democratic National Convention held in New York City.

On July 22, 1926, Anderson announced his campaign for the office of Governor of Mississippi. Three other candidates were also in the race: former governor Theodore G. Bilbo, erstwhile state auditor George C. Riley, and former House Speaker Martin Sennet Conner. He lost the Democratic Party nomination to Theodore G. Bilbo.

=== After 1927 ===
On September 26, 1928, Anderson and his son, William Humphrey, purchased the Neshoba Democrat newspaper from R. C. Peeples. W. H. became the associate editor and business manager, and took active control of the newspaper.

In 1930, the Mississippi Legislature authorized a sum of $20,000 to be used in order to get statues of Jefferson Davis and James Z. George to be placed in the National Statuary Hall. Anderson, alongside D. C. Branlette and C. L. Lincoln, were part of a three-person commission in charge of using the funds to secure statues of the two men and have them placed in the hall. Out of the committee members, only Anderson was in charge of using the funds. On April 17, Mississippi Legislature investigated his use of the funds and found a $8,000 discrepancy between the funds given to Anderson and the funds being currently spent on the statues. On April 22, 1930, Anderson replied with a letter to the legislature, stating that the funds were accounted for.

On May 16, 1930, Anderson was charged with embezzling either $9,000 or the complete sum of the $20,000 of the money for his personal use between negotiations, although the full sum had been returned before his arrest. He made a bail bond of $1,000 for each of the two charges.

Anderson died after a long illness at his home in Ripley, Mississippi, on June 24, 1954.

== Personal life ==
Anderson was a Baptist. He was also a member of the Freemasons, the Knights of Pythias, and the Woodmen of the World. He married Frances Caroline "Carrye" Humphrey on December 24, 1905, in Dumas, Mississippi, . They had four children together: William Humphrey, Mary Belle, Frances Willard, and George Albert. He had six grandchildren at the time of his death.
