= Magnolia Way =

Highway in Mississippi

Magnolia Way Mississippi Highway 780
- Magnolia Way
- The road highlighted in orange

Route information
- Maintained by MDOT
- Length: 5.127 mi (8.251 km)
- Existed: August 24, 2009–present

Major junctions
- West end: CR 203 near Blue Springs
- East end: MS 9 near Sherman

Location
- Country: United States
- State: Mississippi
- Counties: Union, Pontotoc

Highway system
- Mississippi State Highway System; Interstate; US; State
← MS 779	→ MS 781

Magnolia Way, officially designated as Mississippi Highway 780 (MS 780), is a short unsigned state highway in northeastern Mississippi. The road starts at County Road 203 (CR 203), and travels southeastward as a frontage road of the concurrence of Interstate 22 (I-22) and U.S. Route 78 (US 78). It intersects the entrance of the Toyota Motor Manufacturing Mississippi (TMMMS), located near Blue Springs. Magnolia Way ends at its intersection with MS 9 south of Sherman. Construction of the road began in 2007 to serve TMMMS, and it opened on August 24, 2009, two years before the manufacturing plant opened.

== Route description ==
Traffic volume on Magnolia Way
Location	Volume
Southeast of CR 203	420
Corolla Lane	1,800
West of MS 9	1,800
Data was measured in 2016 in terms of AADT; Source: Mississippi Department of Transportation

The road is located in Union and Pontotoc counties. All of the route is maintained by the Mississippi Department of Transportation (MDOT), as part of the Mississippi State Highway System. Although the MS 780 designation appears on MDOT published maps, the designation does not appear on any reassurance marker on either terminus of the road.

West of the village of Blue Springs, Magnolia Way starts at CR 203 of Union County, and begins travelling southeastward. Surrounded by forests, the road parallels the concurrence of I-22 and US 78, acting as a frontage road for the highway. About one-half mile (0.80 km) later, the road travels under a railroad coming from TMMMS and transitions into a four-lane road. Magnolia Way shifts southward near the I-22/US 78-MS 9 interchange, then intersects another frontage road leading to the entrance to the manufacturing plant. It is followed by a connector to MS 9 and the partial cloverleaf interchange to I-22 and US 78. It intersects Corolla Lane (CR 207) east of the plant and shifts eastward, closer to the Interstate Highway. The road intersects Line Road, and enters Pontotoc County. Magnolia Way enters the corporate limits of the town of Sherman, and travels southward afterwards, turning away from the triplex I-22, US 78, and MS 9. It crosses Town Creek and gently curves eastward out of the town. The road then ends at a three-way junction at MS 9 outside of Sherman, south of its interchange with I-22 and US 78.

== History ==
In March 2007, the Mississippi Legislature passed a $323.9 million (equivalent to $471 million in 2024) incentive package for worker training, site construction, and infrastructure improvements, after Toyota announced its plans to build a manufacturing plant near Blue Springs. A fraction of the package, $43 million (equivalent to $62.5 million in 2024), was used to construct new roads and improve existing ones in the area to accommodate the new plant. The project to construct Magnolia Way started soon after the package was approved, and the road opened on August 24, 2009, ahead of schedule. The manufacturing plant produced its first vehicle in November 2011, after an economic downturn caused construction to cease from 2008 to 2010.

== Major intersections ==
County	Location	mi	km	Destinations	Notes
Union		0.0	0.0	CR 203	Western terminus
Union		1.1– 1.2	1.8– 1.9	To I-22 / US 78 / MS 9 – Blue Springs, Memphis, Tupelo	Connector to MS 9
Pontotoc		5.1	8.2	MS 9 to I-22 / US 78 – Pontotoc, Sherman	Eastern terminus
1.000 mi = 1.609 km; 1.000 km = 0.621 mi

== See also ==
- Mississippi Highway 178 – Former alignment of US 78, located to its east
- Nissan Parkway – State maintained route serving a Nissan assembly plant
