= Mississippi Highway 348 =

State Highway in Mississippi

Mississippi Highway 348

Route information
- Maintained by MDOT
- Length: 21.441 mi (34.506 km)
- Existed: 1956–present

Major junctions
- West end: MS 15 / MS 30 in New Albany
- MS 9 betweenin Ellistown; US 45 in Guntown
- East end: Mill Street / Bryson Street in Guntown

Location
- Country: United States
- State: Mississippi
- Counties: Union, Lee County

Highway system
- Mississippi State Highway System; Interstate; US; State
← MS 347	→ MS 349

Mississippi Highway 348 (MS 348) is a 21.4-mile-long (34.4 km) east-west state highway in the North Central Hills of North Mississippi. It connects the cities of New Albany and Guntown, via the community of Ellistown.

== Route description ==
MS 348 begins in Union County in the city of New Albany, at an intersection with MS 15/MS 30 just southeast of downtown. It heads southeast along Center Street through neighborhoods before leaving the city and winding its way through hilly woodlands for the next several miles, passing through the communities of Center and Mound City. The highway becomes concurrent with MS 9 between the communities of Ellistown and Branyan before entering Lee County.

MS 348 immediately crosses Camp Creek before traveling due east through farmland for the next several miles, passing through the communities of Boggan Bend and Blair, to enter the city of Guntown, just shortly before an interchange with U.S. Route 45 (US 45). It enters town along North Main Street and has an intersection with MS 145 where state maintenance and signage for the highway ends. The road then travels through neighborhoods, becoming Bryson Street as Main Street splits off to head south through downtown. The highway continues east to cross a railroad track before state maintenance, as well as MS 348, comes to an end at the intersection between East Mill Street and Bryson Street.

The entire length of Mississippi Highway 348 is a two-lane highway.

== Major intersections ==
County	Location	mi	km	Destinations	Notes
Union	New Albany	0.000	0.000	MS 15 / MS 30 – Downtown New Albany, Pontotoc, Ripley	Western terminus
Union	Ellistown	10.611	17.077	MS 9 south – Blue Springs	Western end of MS 9 concurrency
Union	Branyan	13.148	21.160	MS 9 north – Alpine	Eastern end of MS 9 concurrency
Lee	Guntown	20.261– 20.479	32.607– 32.958	US 45 – Tupelo, Corinth, Booneville	Interchange
Lee	Guntown	20.753	33.399	MS 145 – Baldwyn, Saltillo	Eastern end of state maintenance
Lee	Guntown	21.441	34.506	East Mill Street / Bryson Street	Eastern terminus; road continues east as Bryson Street
1.000 mi = 1.609 km; 1.000 km = 0.621 mi: Concurrency terminus
