= Mississippi Highway 334 =

Highway in Mississippi

Mississippi Highway 334

Route information
- Maintained by MDOT
- Length: 27.772 mi (44.695 km)
- Existed: 1956–present

Major junctions
- West end: MS 7 / MS 314 in Oxford
- US 278 / MS 6 in Oxford; MS 331 near Tula
- East end: MS 9 in Springville

Location
- Country: United States
- State: Mississippi
- Counties: Lafayette, Pontotoc

Highway system
- Mississippi State Highway System; Interstate; US; State
← MS 333	→ MS 335

Mississippi Highway 334 (MS 334) is a 27.772-mile-long (44.695 km) west–east state highway in the North Central Hills region of northern Mississippi, connecting Oxford, through Toccopola, to MS 9 in Springville.

== Route description ==
MS 334 begins in Lafayette County at the interchange between MS 314 (University Avenue) and MS 7 on the east side of downtown. It heads east along University Avenue for a few blocks before turning right and heading south at a signalized intersection. The highway has an interchange with US 278/MS 6 before passing through some neighborhoods and leaving Oxford shortly thereafter. MS 334 winds its way across some wooded hills for a few miles before lowering down into the Yocona River valley, following the river eastward along its northern banks. The highway passes through the communities of Yocona and Cornish (where it has an intersection with MS 331) before entering Pontotoc County.

MS 334 immediately passes through the town of Toccopola before leaving the Yocona River and heading east through mostly woodlands for the next several miles (passing by Camp Yocona) before coming to an end at an intersection with MS 9 in the community of Springville.

The entire length of Mississippi Highway 334, excluding around the interchanges with both MS 7 and US 278/MS 6 in Oxford, is a two-lane highway.

== History ==
The entire route of MS 334 represents the original alignment of MS 6 between Oxford and Pontotoc.

== Major intersections ==
County	Location	mi	km	Destinations	Notes
Lafayette	Oxford	0.000	0.000	MS 7 – Water Valley, Holly Springs MS 314 west (University Avenue) – Downtown Oxford	Western terminus; interchange; eastern terminus of MS 314
Lafayette	Oxford	0.773– 0.892	1.244– 1.436	US 278 / MS 6 – Batesville, Pontotoc	Interchange
Lafayette		12.156	19.563	MS 331 south – Tula	Northern terminus of MS 331
Pontotoc	Springville	27.772	44.695	MS 9 – Pontotoc, Bruce	Eastern terminus
1.000 mi = 1.609 km; 1.000 km = 0.621 mi
