= Mississippi Highway 355 =

State Highway in Mississippi

Mississippi Highway 355

Route information
- Maintained by Pontotoc County and MDOT
- Length: 11.931 mi (19.201 km)
- Existed: 1957–present

Major junctions
- South end: MS 346 near Thaxton
- North end: MS 30 near New Albany

Location
- Country: United States
- State: Mississippi
- Counties: Pontotoc, Union

Highway system
- Mississippi State Highway System; Interstate; US; State
← MS 354	→ MS 356

Mississippi Highway 355 (MS 355) is a 11.9-mile-long (19.2 km) north–south state highway in Pontotoc and Union counties. It connects the town of Thaxton with the town of New Albany.

The entire length of MS 355 is a rural, two-lane, state highway.

== Route description ==
MS 355 begins at an intersection with MS 346 in the community of Esperanza, north of Thaxton in Pontotoc County. The highway at this point is unsigned; it is not maintained by the state, rather by Pontotoc County as unsigned County Road 858 (CR 858). The road heads northwest, then north intersecting minor county roads and crossing Mill Creek as it passes through mostly agricultural fields. At the Pontotoc-Union county line, state maintenance and signage for MS 355 begins. The highway generally continues northwest through woods and farm fields. At Union CR 47, MS 355 reaches a T-intersection; MS 355 heads due west from this intersection. It later curves to the north passing through the community of Etta before ending at MS 30.

== Major junctions ==
County	Location	mi	km	Destinations	Notes
Pontotoc	Esperanza	0.000	0.000	MS 346	Southern terminus
Union	Etta	11.931	19.201	MS 30 – Oxford, New Albany	Northern terminus
1.000 mi = 1.609 km; 1.000 km = 0.621 mi
