= Mississippi Highway 346 =

Highway in Mississippi

Mississippi Highway 346
- Hurricane Road

Route information
- Maintained by MDOT
- Length: 9.644 mi (15.521 km)
- Existed: 1958–present

Major junctions
- West end: Hurricane Road near Esperanza
- MS 355 in Esperanza
- East end: MS 15 in Ecru

Location
- Country: United States
- State: Mississippi
- Counties: Pontotoc

Highway system
- Mississippi State Highway System; Interstate; US; State
← MS 345	→ MS 347

Mississippi Highway 346 (MS 346), also known as Hurricane Road, is a 9.644-mile-long (15.521 km) west–east state highway in Pontotoc County, Mississippi, connecting the community of Esperanza with MS 15 and the town of Ecru. It is generally a narrow two-lane route.

== Route description ==
MS 346 begins at the beginning of state maintenance just before Sand Springs Church, with the road continuing west as Hurricane Road to MS 336. It heads east past the church, and through farmland, to pass through the community of Esperanza, where it has an intersection with MS 355. The highway continues east to cross Cane Creek before paralleling the southern banks of the Little Tallahatchie River as it travels through farmland for the next several miles. MS 346 enters the town of Ecru city limits, immediately passing by the Ashley Furniture plant before coming to an end at an intersection with MS 15, just across the river from downtown.

The entire length of Mississippi Highway 346 is a rural, two-lane, state highway, located entirely in Pontotoc County.

== Major intersections ==
The entire route is in Pontotoc County.

Location	mi	km	Destinations	Notes
Esperanza	0.000	0.000	Hurricane Road	Continuation beyond end of state maintenance; western terminus
Esperanza	1.702	2.739	MS 355 north (Esperanza Road)	Southern terminus of MS 355
Ecru	9.644	15.521	MS 15 – Pontotoc, New Albany	Eastern terminus
1.000 mi = 1.609 km; 1.000 km = 0.621 mi
