= Jug Fork, Mississippi =

- Unincorporated community
- Location within Mississippi Location within the United States
- Coordinates: 34°25′35″N 88°47′21″W
- Country: United States
- State: Mississippi
- County: Lee, Union
- Elevation: 341 ft (104 m)
- Time zone: UTC-6 (Central (CST))
  - Summer (DST): UTC-5 (CDT)
- Postal code: 38828
- Area code: 662
- GNIS feature ID: 672049

Jug Fork is an unincorporated community on the Lee-Union County line in northeast Mississippi, United States.

Jug Fork is approximately 5.5 miles (8.9 km) south-southwest of Blue Springs and approximately 7 miles (11 km) west-northwest of Ellistown. The Lee County side is part of the Tupelo Micropolitan Statistical Area.
