= Bywy Creek =

Bywy Creek may refer to:

- Bywy Creek (Choctaw County, Mississippi)
- By-Wy Creek (Biba Wila Creek tributary)
