= William J. East =

American politician (1854–1933)

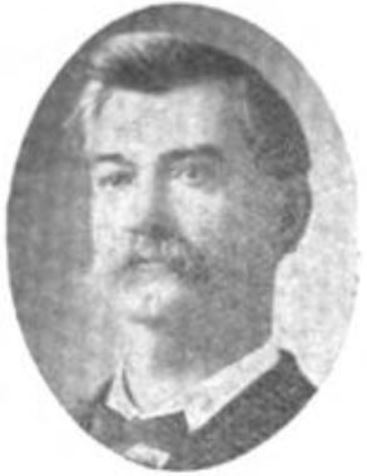
- c. 1907

Member of the Mississippi Senate from the 36th district
- In office January 1928 – January 1932
- In office January 1920 – January 1924
- Preceded by: Sam Mims Jr. William H. Dyson; Henry C. Collins
- In office January 1908 – January 1912
- In office January 1892 – January 1896

Member of the Mississippi House of Representatives from the Tate County district
- In office January 1916 – January 1920 Serving with Servetus L. Crockett
- In office January 1904 – January 1908
- In office January 1896 – January 1900

Personal details
- Born: September 1, 1854 Monroe County, MS
- Died: 1933 (aged 78–79) Mississippi
- Party: Democrat

William Jasper East (September 1, 1854 - 1933) was a longtime Democratic Mississippi state legislator from Tate County in the late 19th and early 20th centuries.

== Early life ==
William Jasper East was born on September 1, 1854, in Monroe County, Mississippi. He was the eldest child of Josiah Robertson East and Matilda (Callahan) East. William attended the public schools of Panola County. He entered the University of Mississippi in 1879 and graduated from there with a L. L. B. in 1881. He then studied law, and was admitted to the bar in 1883. He then went to practice law in Senatobia.

== Political career ==
He was the mayor of Senatobia, Mississippi, from 1887 to 1888. He then was a member of the Mississippi State Senate, representing the state's 36th district which was composed of Union, Tippah, Benton, Marshall, and Tate counties, from 1892 to 1896. From 1896 to 1900, he was a member of the Mississippi House of Representatives for Tate County. He was a presidential elector in the 1900 presidential election. After being re-elected in 1903, he was again a member of the Mississippi House for Tate County from 1904 to 1908. From 1908 to 1912, he was again a member of the Mississippi State Senate for the 36th district. He served in the Mississippi House of Representatives for Tate County a final time from 1916 to 1920. He was again a member of the Mississippi Senate for the 36th district from 1920 to 1924. He then served in the same position from 1928 to 1932. East died in Mississippi in 1933.

== Personal life ==
East was an Episcopalian. He was a member of the Phi Kappa Psi (ΦΚΨ) fraternity. East married Lula Whitten in 1892. They had three children, Whitten, Fletcher, and Lula.
