= Tupelo Automobile Museum =

Coordinates: 34.25889°N 88.69691°W

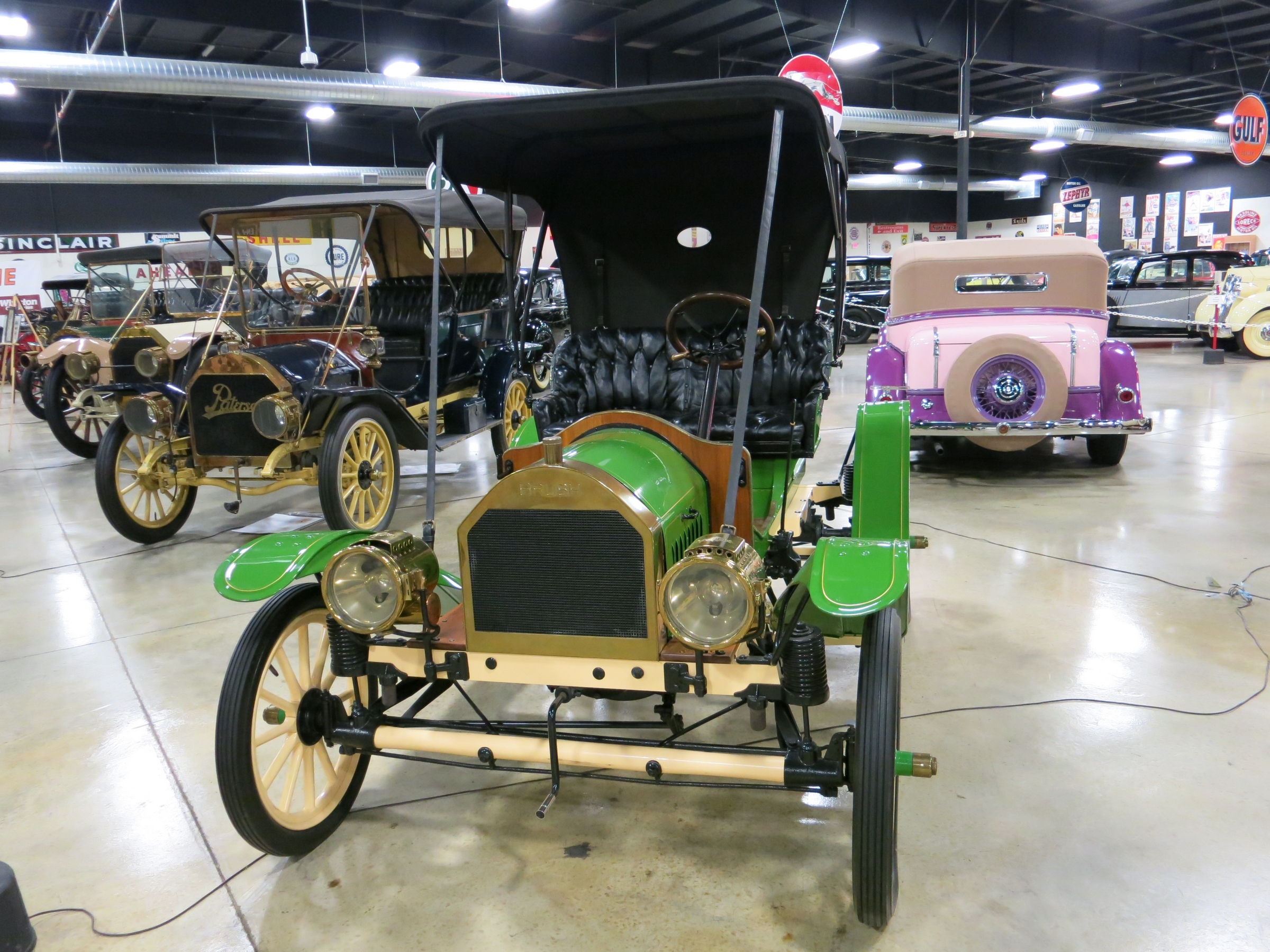
Vehicles at the Tupelo Automobile Museum

The Tupelo Automobile Museum was located in Tupelo, Mississippi. This museum had over one hundred cars. Consisting of the late Frank K. Spain's personal collection, which totalled 150 vehicles, the cars ranged from antique, rare, and celebrity and were displayed in chronological order to illustrate the history of automotive design and innovation.

The museum sold its collection to benefit a charitable educational foundation and closed in 2019.

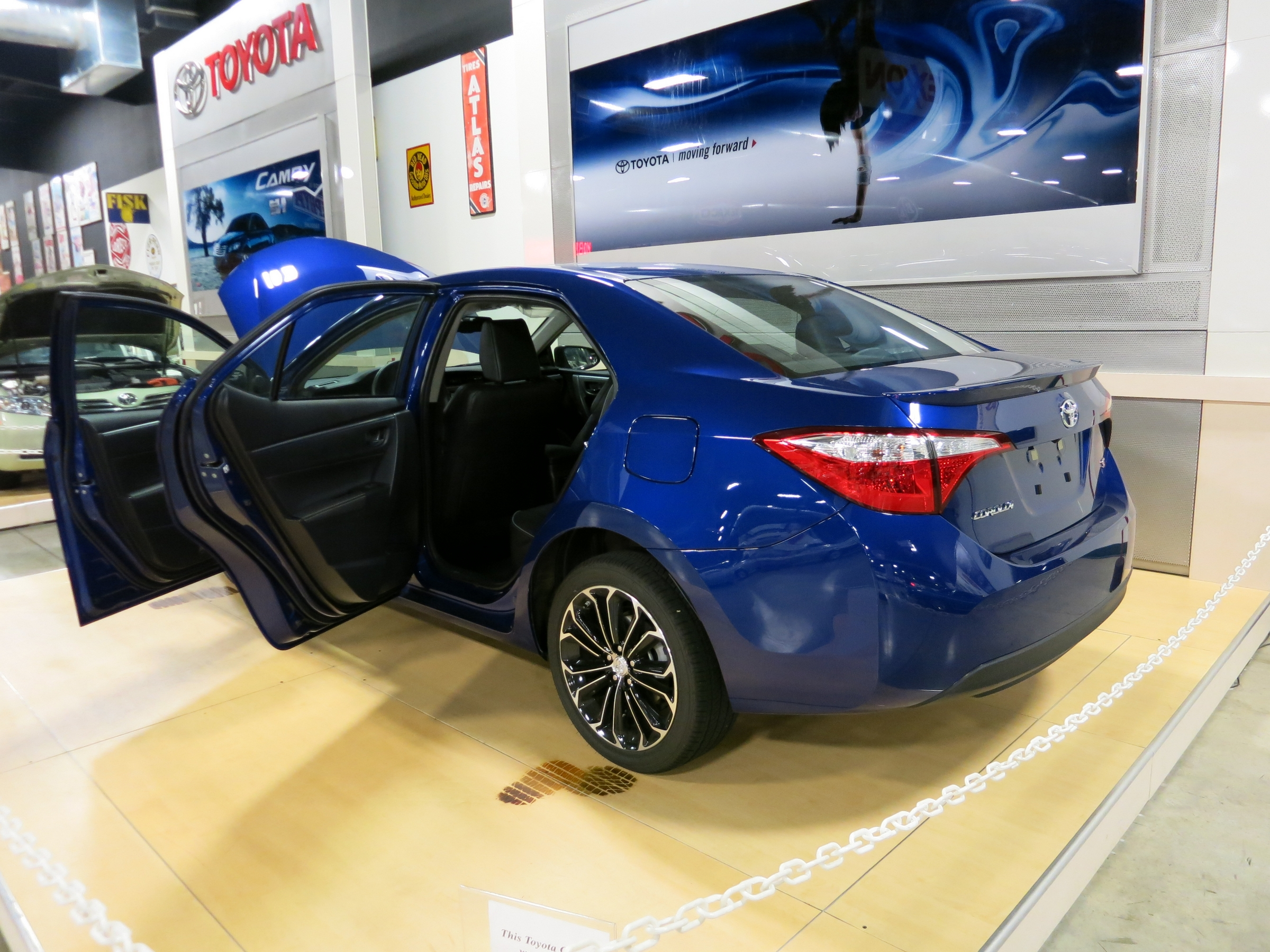
Display of a 2014 Toyota Corolla built by Toyota Motor Manufacturing Mississippi in Blue Springs, Mississippi.

== Collection ==
The museum had over one hundred cars on display. Some of the cars were: a Tucker 48, a 1899 Knox, a 1964 Leslie, a never-driven Dodge Viper, and a 1976 Lincoln Mark IV. The specially built "Leslie Special" was in the film The Great Race. The 1976 Lincoln Mark IV was once owned by Elvis Presley. The museum also featured Hispano-Suizas.
