= Enville =

Enville may refer to:

- Enville, Staffordshire, England, a rural village
- Enville, Oklahoma, United States, a rural community
- Enville, Tennessee, United States, a town
- Enville, alternate name for Endville, Mississippi, an unincorporated community
