= New Harmony, Mississippi =

- Unincorporated community
- Location within Mississippi Location within the United States
- Coordinates: 34°23′38″N 88°55′11″W
- Country: United States
- State: Mississippi
- County: Union
- Elevation: 482 ft (147 m)
- Time zone: UTC-6 (Central (CST))
  - Summer (DST): UTC-5 (CDT)
- Postal code: 38828
- Area code: 662
- GNIS feature ID: 674636

New Harmony is an unincorporated community located near U.S. Route 78 in Union County, Mississippi.

New Harmony is approximately 2.7 miles (4.3 km) east-northeast of Blue Springs and approximately 7 miles (11 km) southeast of New Albany.
