= Senator Dyson =

Senator Dyson may refer to:

- Fred Dyson (born 1939), Alaska State Senate
- Roy Dyson (born 1948), Maryland State Senate
- Thomas A. Dyson (1851–1898), Wisconsin State Senate
- William H. Dyson (1882–1964), Mississippi State Senate
