= Enterprise, Mississippi =

Enterprise, Mississippi may refer to:

- Enterprise, Clarke County, Mississippi, a town in Clarke County, Mississippi
- Enterprise, Union County, Mississippi, an unincorporated community in Union County, Mississippi
