= Sarepta (disambiguation) =

Sarepta was an ancient Phoenician city.

Sarepta may also refer to:

== Places ==
- Sarepta, Louisiana, a town
- Sarepta, Mississippi, an unincorporated community
- Sarepta, a community within the town of Bluewater, Ontario, Canada
- Sarepta, a suburb of Cape Town, Western Cape province, South Africa

== Other uses ==
- Sarepta Therapeutics, an American medical research and drug development company
- HMS Sarepta, a Royal Navy air station from 1917 to 1959, when it was renamed
- Sarepta M. I. Henry (1839–1900), a Woman's Christian Temperance Union leader

== See also ==
- Old Sarepta, a district of Volgograd, Russia
- New Sarepta, a hamlet in Alberta, Canada
