= Mississippi Highway 331 =

Highway in Mississippi

Mississippi Highway 331

Route information
- Maintained by MDOT
- Length: 13.439 mi (21.628 km)
- Existed: 1956–present

Major junctions
- North end: MS 9 near Sarepta
- South end: MS 334 north of Tula

Location
- Country: United States
- State: Mississippi
- Counties: Calhoun, Lafayette

Highway system
- Mississippi State Highway System; Interstate; US; State
← MS 330	→ MS 332

Mississippi Highway 331 (MS 331) is a 13.4-mile-long (21.6 km) south-north state highway in the North Central Hills region of northern Mississippi, connecting MS 9 to MS 334. It is generally a narrow two-lane route.

It starts on MS 9 southwest of Sarepta, and extends north to or near Tula and ends on MS 334 north of Tula.

== Route description ==
MS 331 begins at an intersection with MS 9 in northern Calhoun County, roughly five miles north of Bruce and three miles west of Sarepta. It heads north through farmland for a couple of miles before entering the hilly, remote, wooded terrain of the Holly Springs National Forest. The highway then enters Lafayette County. MS 331 winds its way through hills of the National Forest for several miles before exiting and immediately passing through community of Tula. The highway now crosses the Yocona River before coming to an end at an intersection with MS 334 at the community of Cornish.

The entire length of Mississippi Highway 331 is a rural, two-lane, state highway.

== Major intersections ==
County	Location	mi	km	Destinations	Notes
Calhoun		0.000	0.000	MS 9 – Bruce, Pontotoc	Southern terminus
Lafayette	Cornish	13.439	21.628	MS 334 – Oxford, Toccopola	Northern terminus
1.000 mi = 1.609 km; 1.000 km = 0.621 mi
