= By-Wy Creek (Biba Wila Creek tributary) =

Stream in Mississippi, U.S.

- Location within Mississippi Location within the United States
- Etymology: Choctaw word baii, meaning "white oak", and waiya, meaning "leaning"

Location
- Country: United States
- State: Mississippi
- County: Oktibbeha

Physical characteristics
- Source
  - location: near Maben, Mississippi
  - coordinates: 33°31′42.44″N 89°3′55.22″W
  - elevation: 492 feet (150 m)
- Mouth: Biba Wila Creek
  - location: near Pheba, Mississippi
  - coordinates: 33°30′57.44″N 88°59′8.22″W
  - elevation: 342 feet (104 m)

By-Wy Creek is a stream in the U.S. state of Mississippi. It is a tributary to Biba Wila Creek.

By-Wy (pronounced BYE-wye) is a name derived from the Choctaw language meaning "leaning white oak".
