= Mississippi Highway 859 =

Highway in Mississippi

Mississippi Highway 859

Route information
- Maintained by MDOT
- Length: 0.5 mi (800 m)

Major junctions
- South end: Church Road/Old Jackson Road in Gluckstadt
- North end: MS 857 in Gluckstadt

Location
- Country: United States
- State: Mississippi
- Counties: Madison

Highway system
- Mississippi State Highway System; Interstate; US; State
← MS 857	→ MS 860

Mississippi Highway 859 (MS 859) is a highway in Central Mississippi in Gluckstadt. The highway's southern terminus is at Church Road/Old Jackson Road in Gluckstadt. It travels north to its northern terminus at MS 857 in Gluckstadt. The highway carried 5,600 vehicles on average in 2023.

== Major intersections ==
The entire route is in Gluckstadt, Madison County.

mi	km	Destinations	Notes
0.0	0.0	Church Road/Old Jackson Road	Southern terminus
0.5	0.80	MS 857 to I-55 – Grenada, Jackson	Northern terminus
1.000 mi = 1.609 km; 1.000 km = 0.621 mi
