= Bywy, Mississippi =

- Unincorporated community
- Location within Mississippi Location within the United States
- Coordinates: 33°26′14″N 89°14′28″W
- Country: United States
- State: Mississippi
- County: Choctaw
- Elevation: 436 ft (133 m)
- Time zone: UTC-6 (Central (CST))
  - Summer (DST): UTC-5 (CDT)
- Area code: 662
- GNIS feature ID: 667894

Bywy is an unincorporated community in Choctaw County, Mississippi, United States. Variant names are "Biwyah" and "Wise Store".

== History ==
A post office called Bywy was established in 1880, and remained in operation until 1903. The community takes its name from Bywy Creek.
