= Mississippi Highway 857 =

Highway in Mississippi

Mississippi Highway 857

Route information
- Maintained by MDOT
- Length: 4.504 mi (7.248 km)

Major junctions
- South end: Calhoun Station Parkway in Gluckstadt
- I-55 – Grenada, Jackson
- North end: Nissan Parkway in Canton

Location
- Country: United States
- State: Mississippi
- Counties: Madison

Highway system
- Mississippi State Highway System; Interstate; US; State
← MS 855	→ MS 859

Mississippi Highway 857 (MS 857) is a highway in Central Mississippi that connects Gluckstadt to Canton.

== Route description ==
MS 857's southern terminus is at Calhoun Station Parkway in Gluckstadt then shortly after the southern terminus it has an interchange with I-55 exit 114 then continues north and intersects with MS 860 and then the northern terminus is at Nissan Parkway in Canton.

== Major intersections ==
The entire route is in Madison County.

Location	mi	km	Destinations	Notes
Gluckstadt	0.00	0.00	Calhoun Station Parkway	Southern terminus
Gluckstadt	0.2	0.32	I-55 – Grenada, Jackson	Diamond interchange; I-55 exit 114; signed as 114A (east) and 114B (west) southbound
Gluckstadt	0.7	1.1	MS 859 south	Northern terminus of MS 859
	3.1	5.0	MS 860 east	Western terminus of MS 860
Canton	4.5	7.2	Nissan Parkway to I-55 / US 51 / MS 16	Northern terminus
1.000 mi = 1.609 km; 1.000 km = 0.621 mi
