= Henry Clay Collins =

American politician

Member of the Mississippi State Senate from the 36th district
- In office January 1932 – January 1936 Serving with V. E. Crawford; R. S. Hardy
- In office January 1916 – January 1920 Serving with Sam Mims Jr. William H. Dyson

Personal details
- Born: December 20, 1883 Myrtle, Mississippi, U.S.
- Died: April 26, 1950 (aged 66) Enterprise, Mississippi
- Party: Democratic

Henry Clay Collins (December 20, 1883 – April 26, 1950) was an American teacher and Democratic politician. He was a member of the Mississippi State Senate, from the 36th District, from 1916 to 1920 and from 1932 to 1936.

== Biography ==
Henry Clay Collins was born on December 20, 1883, in Myrtle, Mississippi. He was the son of Alva Collins, a one-time county treasurer of Union County, Mississippi, and Fannie Virginia (Graham) Collins. Collins was of English (paternal) and Scotch-Irish (maternal) descent. Collins attended the common schools of Union County, and attended the Chalybeate Springs Institute for two years. Collins then attended Mississippi College, where he played on the football team and took training courses to become a teacher, graduating with a Ph. B. in 1910.

== Professional career ==
After graduating, Collins taught at high schools. In 1915, Collins was elected to represent the 36th District as a Democrat in the Mississippi State Senate for the 1916–1920 term. In 1931, Collins was re-elected to the Senate, and served in the 1932–1936 term. During this term, Collins was the chairman of the Senate's Labor Committee.

== Personal life and death ==
Collins was a member of the Baptist Church, and he was also a member of the Freemasons and of the Woodmen of the World. He married Marietta Bridges on November 24, 1910. Collins died suddenly at his home in Enterprise, Mississippi, on April 26, 1950.
