= Nissan Parkway =

Highway in Mississippi

Nissan Pkwy
- The parkway highlighted in red
- Maintained by: Mississippi Department of Transportation
- Length: 2.9 mi (4.7 km)
- Location: Madison County, Mississippi
- West end: MS 22 near Canton
- Major junctions: I-55 in Canton
- East end: US 51 / MS 16 in Canton

Construction
- Construction start: December 2001
- Completion: December 2002

Nissan Parkway is a short divided highway in central Mississippi. The road starts at Mississippi Highway 22 (MS 22). It travels east to an interchange with Interstate 55 (I-55) and intersects a road leading to a Nissan assembly plant. The parkway then continues eastward to its eastern terminus at U.S. Route 51 (US 51) and MS 16. Nissan Parkway was constructed in 2002 from MS 22 to I-55, after being proposed in one year before. The road was extended to its current eastern terminus by 2003.

== Description ==
All of the road is inside Madison County and is a divided highway. The parkway is fully maintained by the Mississippi Department of Transportation (MDOT). In 2017, MDOT calculated as many as 14,000 vehicles traveling west of Nissan Drive, and as few as 4,300 vehicles traveling east of Industrial Parkway. This is expressed in terms of annual average daily traffic (AADT), a measure of traffic volume for any average day of the year.

Nissan Parkway starts at MS 22 southwest of Canton, and travels southeastward. The road soon turns east at Old Jackson Road, and trees soon clears up. Nissan Parkway then curves to the northeast, near a road to a medical center. The parkway later turns east at Mississippi Parkway, which leads to a Mississippi State University extension center. Nissan Parkway soon intersects Interstate 55 (I-55) at a cloverleaf interchange. The road then meets the northern terminus of Nissan Drive (MS 857), linking to a Nissan assembly plant. The parkway travels near a pond, and crosses over a railroad owned by the Canadian National Railway. Less than one mile (1.6 km) later, Nissan Parkway ends at US 51 and MS 16. The road continues east as MS 16 and Canton Parkway.

== History ==
In November 2000, Nissan announced plans to build an assembly plant near Canton, and the Madison County Board of Supervisors and MDOT issued $20 million (equivalent to $34.5 million in 2024) worth of bonds and allocated $65 million (equivalent to $112 million in 2024) respectively for roads, bridges, and interchanges. The solicitation of bids for the parkway were announced in October 2001, with the road starting from MS 22 to I-55, and extending to US 51 in another phase. The project began by December 2001, along with nearby Nissan Drive. The parkway was almost complete by September 2002, and it was opened by December of that year. The remaining section from I-55 to US 51 was finished by 2003, with the final project cost close to $35 million (equivalent to $57 million in 2024). The plant opened on May 27, 2003, after two years of construction and the Mississippi Legislature investing $363 million (equivalent to $591 million in 2024) into the facility. In 2013, Canton Parkway was built, connecting Nissan Parkway and US 51 to MS 43, with MS 16 being rerouted onto both Nissan Parkway and Canton Parkway at that time between I-55 and MS 43.

== Major intersections ==
The entire route is in Madison County.

Location	mi	km	Destinations	Notes
	0.0	0.0	MS 22 – Canton, Flora	Western terminus
Canton	1.3– 1.9	2.1– 3.1	I-55 – Grenada, Jackson	Cloverleaf interchange; I-55 exit 118 A/B
Canton	2.0	3.2	MS 857 south (Nissan Drive)	Northern terminus of MS 857
Canton	2.9	4.7	US 51 (South Liberty Street) / MS 16 – Canton, Gluckstadt	Eastern terminus
1.000 mi = 1.609 km; 1.000 km = 0.621 mi: Concurrency terminus

== See also ==
- Magnolia Way – State maintained road linking to a Toyota manufacturing facility
- List of state highways in Mississippi
