= Union County School District (Mississippi) =

School district in Mississippi

Address
- 250 Carter Avenue New Albany, Mississippi, 38652; United States
- Coordinates: 34.491783°N 89.009960°W

District information
- Type: Public
- Grades: PreK–12
- NCES District ID: 2804350

Students and staff
- Students: 2,899
- Teachers: 186.54
- Staff: 193.84
- Student–teacher ratio: 15.54

Other information
- Website: www.union.k12.ms.us

The Union County School District is a public school district based in Union County, Mississippi (USA).

The district serves the towns of Blue Springs and Myrtle, the Union County part of Sherman, and most of rural Union County, as well as small portions of New Albany.

Its headquarters are in New Albany.

== Schools ==
- East Union Attendance Center
- Ingomar Attendance Center
- Myrtle Attendance Center
- West Union Attendance Center

== Demographics ==
=== 2006-07 school year ===
There were a total of 2,642 students enrolled in the Union County School District during the 2006–2007 school year. The gender makeup of the district was 50% female and 50% male. The racial makeup of the district was 8.44% African American, 90.31% White, 1.21% Hispanic, and 0.04% Asian. 40.3% of the district's students were eligible to receive free lunch.

=== Previous school years ===
School Year	Enrollment	Gender Makeup		Racial Makeup				
School Year	Enrollment	Female	Male	Asian	African American	Hispanic	Native American	White
2005-06	2,720	50%	50%	0.07%	7.79%	1.21%	–	90.92%
2004-05	2,711	50%	50%	0.11%	8.52%	0.92%	0.07%	90.37%
2003-04	2,738	49%	51%	0.15%	8.69%	0.69%	–	90.47%
2002-03	2,697	50%	50%	0.15%	7.19%	0.48%	–	92.18

== Accountability statistics ==
	2006-07	2005-06	2004-05	2003-04	2002-03
District Accreditation Status	Accredited	Accredited	Accredited	Accredited	Accredited
School Performance Classifications
Level 5 (Superior Performing) Schools	3	3	2	4	2
Level 4 (Exemplary) Schools	1	1	2	0	2
Level 3 (Successful) Schools	0	0	0	0	0
Level 2 (Under Performing) Schools	0	0	0	0	0
Level 1 (Low Performing) Schools	0	0	0	0	0
Not Assigned	0	0	0	0	0

== See also ==
- List of school districts in Mississippi
