= Henry L. Davis =

American politician

Member of the Mississippi Senate from the 32nd district
- In office January 1940 – January 1944
- In office January 1928 – January 1932
- In office January 1920 – January 1924

Member of the Mississippi House of Representatives from the Lafayette County district
- In office January 1926 – January 1928
- In office January 1916 – January 1920

Personal details
- Born: October 3, 1868 Dallon, Mississippi
- Died: September 18, 1948 (aged 79) Oxford, Mississippi
- Party: Democrat

Richard Henry Lee Davis (October 3, 1868 - September 18, 1948) was a dairyman, farmer, merchant, mayor and Democratic Party politician. He served in the Mississippi House of Representatives and Mississippi Senate in the early 20th century. He was also a mayor.

== Biography ==
Richard Henry Lee Davis was born on October 3, 1868, in Dallon, Lafayette County, Mississippi. He was the son of Aaron Davis and Dincilla (Bailey) Davis. Davis attended the schools of Lafayette County.

Starting in 1908, he was a member of the Board of Supervisors of Lafayette County, Mississippi, and he also was a mayor of Tula, Mississippi, his town of residence. In 1915, he was elected to represent Lafayette County as a Democrat in the Mississippi House of Representatives and served from 1916 to 1920. In 1919, he was elected to represent Mississippi's 32nd senatorial district in the Mississippi Senate from 1920 to 1924. He served in the House again from 1924 to 1926. He then served in the Senate in the same district as before from 1928 to 1932. Finally, he served in the Senate again from 1940 to 1944. He died on September 18, 1948, in his home in Oxford, Mississippi.
