= Don Grist =

American politician and jurist (1938–2022)

William LaDon Grist (April 8, 1938 – February 23, 2022) was an American politician and jurist.

Grist was born in Sarepta, Mississippi. He received his degree in chemistry from the University of Southern Mississippi and his law degree from the Mississippi College School of Law. Grist was admitted to the Mississippi bar. He practiced law in Vardaman, Mississippi. Grist served in the Mississippi House of Representatives from 1976 to 1990. He then served as chancellor in the Mississippi Chancery Courts until he retired. Grist lived in Oxford, Mississippi. Grist died at his son's home in Alexander, Arkansas.
