= Paden, Mississippi =

- Village
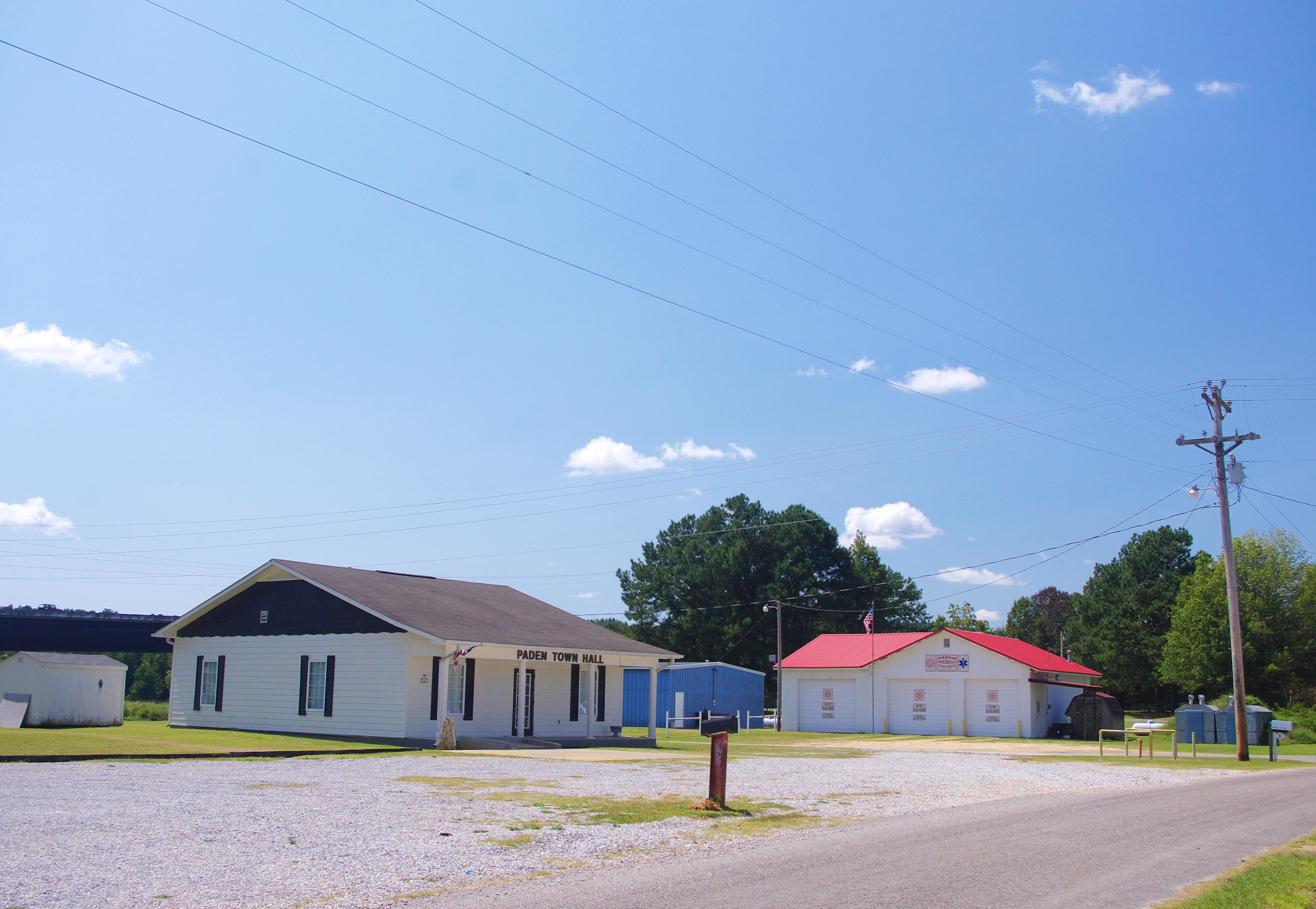
- Paden Town Hall

- Location of Paden, Mississippi

- Location in the United States
- Coordinates: 34°39′25″N 88°15′18″W
- Country: United States
- State: Mississippi
- County: Tishomingo

Area
  - Total: 0.90 sq mi (2.33 km^{2})
  - Land: 0.90 sq mi (2.33 km^{2})
  - Water: 0 sq mi (0.00 km^{2})
- Elevation: 440 ft (130 m)

Population (2020)
  - Total: 104
  - Density: 115.5/sq mi (44.59/km^{2})
- Time zone: UTC-6 (Central (CST))
  - Summer (DST): UTC-5 (CDT)
- ZIP code: 38873
- Area code: 662
- FIPS code: 28-55000
- GNIS feature ID: 2407516

Paden is a village in Tishomingo County, Mississippi, United States. As of the 2020 census, Paden had a population of 104.

== History ==
An early settler of the area, Thomas Paden, built his home here, which he called Castle Garden. The establishment was burned by Union troops during the American Civil War and the area became known as Burnt Hill. When the town was incorporated its name was changed to Paden.

== Geography ==
Paden is on the north side of Mississippi Highway 30 northwest of Tishomingo. The Tennessee-Tombigbee Waterway passes just west of Paden. The Paden Overlook Area, a park along the waterway, lies to the southwest.

According to the United States Census Bureau, the village has a total area of 0.9 square miles (2.3 km^{2}), all land.

=== Lakes, rivers, and streams ===
- Bay Springs Lake
- Black Branch
- Panther Creek
- Pollard Mill Branch
- Tennessee-Tombigbee Waterway

== Demographics ==
Historical population
Census	Pop.	Note	%±
1910	186		—
1920	250		34.4%
1930	167		−33.2%
1940	194		16.2%
1950	158		−18.6%
1960	134		−15.2%
1970	97		−27.6%
1980	119		22.7%
1990	123		3.4%
2000	106		−13.8%
2010	116		9.4%
2020	104		−10.3%
U.S. Decennial Census

Village of Paden
Population by year

1990 - 123
2000 - 106
2004 - 106 (estimate)

As of the census of 2000, there were 106 people, 49 households, and 29 families residing in the village. The population density was 118.6 inhabitants per square mile (45.8/km^{2}). There were 65 housing units at an average density of 72.7 per square mile (28.1/km^{2}). The racial makeup of the village was 100.00% White.

There were 49 households, out of which 32.7% had children under the age of 18 living with them, 44.9% were married couples living together, 8.2% had a female householder with no husband present, and 40.8% were non-families. 38.8% of all households were made up of individuals, and 18.4% had someone living alone who was 65 years of age or older. The average household size was 2.16 and the average family size was 2.90.

In the village, the population was spread out, with 25.5% under the age of 18, 5.7% from 18 to 24, 36.8% from 25 to 44, 16.0% from 45 to 64, and 16.0% who were 65 years of age or older. The median age was 37 years. For every 100 females, there were 107.8 males. For every 100 females age 18 and over, there were 119.4 males.

The median income for a household in the village was $38,333, and the median income for a family was $43,000. Males had a median income of $28,333 versus $16,750 for females. The per capita income for the village was $17,861. There were 5.3% of families and 4.4% of the population living below the poverty line, including no under eighteens and none of those over 64.

== Education ==
The Village of Paden is served by the Tishomingo County School District.

== Transportation ==
=== Highways ===
- Mississippi Highway 30 - east–west corridor that connects Paden to Booneville to the west, and the Natchez Trace Parkway to the east

=== Railroads ===
- Redmont Railway

== Industry ==
The main manufacturing plant for Domes International, Inc., a company that designs and manufactures dome-shaped fiberglass products, is in Paden.
