= Springville, Mississippi =

Unincorporated community in Mississippi, United States

- Unincorporated community
- Location within Mississippi Location within the United States
- Coordinates: 34°13′54″N 89°06′13″W
- Country: United States
- State: Mississippi
- County: Pontotoc
- Elevation: 489 ft (149 m)
- Time zone: UTC-6 (Central (CST))
  - Summer (DST): UTC-5 (CDT)
- Postal code: 38863
- Area code: 662
- GNIS feature ID: 678188

Springville is an unincorporated community in Pontotoc County, Mississippi.

Springville is located on Mississippi Highway 9 approximately 6.9 miles (11.1 km) west of Pontotoc and approximately 24.7 miles (39.8 km) northeast of Bruce. It is part of the Tupelo Micropolitan Statistical Area.

The community was first settled in 1867.

A post office operated under the name Springville from 1908 to 1956.
