= Ellistown, Mississippi =

- Unincorporated community
- Location within Mississippi Location within the United States
- Coordinates: 34°26′41″N 88°50′27″W
- Country: United States
- State: Mississippi
- County: Union
- Elevation: 364 ft (111 m)
- Time zone: UTC-6 (Central (CST))
  - Summer (DST): UTC-5 (CDT)
- Postal code: 38828
- Area code: 662
- GNIS feature ID: 669745

Ellistown is an unincorporated community in Union County, Mississippi.

Ellistown is approximately 3.1 miles (5.0 km) east-southeast of Jug Fork and approximately 3.6 miles (5.8 km) north-northeast of Blue Springs. It is part of the Tupelo Micropolitan Statistical Area.
