= Mississippi Highway 349 =

State highway in Mississippi

Mississippi Highway 349
- MS 347 in blue, MS 349 in red

Route information
- Maintained by MDOT
- Length: 17.111 mi (27.537 km)
- Existed: 1953–present

Major junctions
- South end: MS 30 near New Albany
- North end: MS 178 in Potts Camp

Location
- Country: United States
- State: Mississippi
- Counties: Union, Marshall

Highway system
- Mississippi State Highway System; Interstate; US; State
← MS 348	→ MS 350

Mississippi Highway 349 (MS 349) is a 17.1-mile-long (27.5 km) north–south state highway in the North Central Hills region of North Mississippi. It connects MS 30 to the town of Potts Camp ending at MS 178. All of MS 349 travels within Holly Springs National Forest. A loop of MS 349 runs to the east of the highway near Bethlehem is designated Mississippi Highway 347.

== Route description ==
MS 349 begins in Union County at an intersection with MS 30, roughly halfway between New Albany and Oxford along the banks of the Tallahatchie River. It follows along the northern bank of the river as it winds its way northeast for a few miles, where it makes a sharp left turn, before crossing into Marshall County. The highway immediately passes through the community of Cornersville, where it makes another sharp left, before leaving the Tallahatchie River curving northward, traveling through farmland as it passes through the community of Bethlehem. MS 349 begins following the Tippah River as it crosses some wooded hills before entering the town of Potts Camp at a crossing of Oaklimeter Creek. It enters town along South Center Street, passing through neighborhoods before crossing railroad tracks into downtown, first intersecting Front Avenue (which carries unsigned MS 701), coming to an end shortly thereafter at an intersection MS 178 (Church Avenue) at the center of town.

Though MS 349 does not continue to Interstate 22, there is signage at exit 41 (the Potts Camp exit) stating "To 349 - Potts Camp." The entire length of MS 349 is a rural, two-lane, state highway.

== Major intersections ==
County	Location	mi	km	Destinations	Notes
Union		0.000	0.000	MS 30 – New Albany, Oxford	Southern terminus
Marshall	Bethlehem	11.808	19.003	MS 347 north (Macedonia Road)	Southern terminus of unsigned MS 347
Marshall		14.781	23.788	MS 347 south (Barber Road)	Northern terminus of unsigned MS 347
Marshall	Potts Camp	17.018	27.388	MS 701 (Front Avenue)	
Marshall	Potts Camp	17.111	27.537	MS 178 (Church Avenue) – New Albany, Holly Springs	Northern terminus
1.000 mi = 1.609 km; 1.000 km = 0.621 mi

== Related route ==
Mississippi Highway 347
- Location: Bethlehem - Potts Camp
- Length: 3.577 mi (5.757 km)
- Existed: 1958–present

Mississippi Highway 347 (MS 347) is a 3.577-mile-long (5.757 km), unsigned, and locally maintained, north–south road in Marshall County, Mississippi. It acts as an eastern loop off of MS 349, serving several local farms.

MS 347 begins as Macedonia Road in the community of Bethlehem at an intersection with MS 349. The road winds its way across a wooded ridge for the next mile before lowering down into valley and passing through farmland. MS 347 now takes a left onto Barber Road to pass through a small portion of Holly Springs National Forest before coming to an end at another intersection with MS 349, just two miles (3.2 km) south of the town of Potts Camp. The entire length of Mississippi Highway 347 is a rural, unsigned, and narrow two-lane road.

The entire route is in Marshall County.

Location	mi	km	Destinations	Notes
Bethlehem	0.000	0.000	MS 349 / Macedonia Road	Southern terminus
	3.577	5.757	MS 349	Northern terminus
1.000 mi = 1.609 km; 1.000 km = 0.621 mi
