= Bloody Springs, Mississippi =

- Unincorporated community
- Location of Bloody Springs in Mississippi Bloody Springs, Mississippi (the United States)
- Coordinates: 34°35′18.34″N 88°8′27.15″W
- Country: United States
- State: Mississippi
- County: Tishomingo
- Elevation: 538 ft (164 m)
- Time zone: UTC-6 (Central (CST))
  - Summer (DST): UTC-5 (CDT)
- GNIS feature ID: 691711

Bloody Springs is an inhabited area in Tishomingo County, Mississippi. It is located at 538 feet above sea level. The community is located off of County Road 85. There is a graveyard in the area. Bloody Springs was included in an article on the strangest town names in America.

The community was first settled in the early 1800s. Hunting is a common pastime for residents.
