= Biba Wila Creek =

Stream in Mississippi, U.S.

Coordinates: 33°29′54″N 88°52′02″W

Biba Wila Creek is a stream in the U.S. state of Mississippi. It is a tributary to Trim Cane Creek.

Biba Wila Creek is a name derived from the Choctaw language meaning "where the mulberry trees stand in rows".
