= Enterprise, Union County, Mississippi =

Enterprise, Mississippi
- Unincorporated community
- Location within Mississippi Location within the United States
- Coordinates: 34°28′01″N 89°09′26″W
- Country: United States
- State: Mississippi
- County: Union
- Elevation: 335 ft (102 m)
- Time zone: UTC-6 (Central (CST))
  - Summer (DST): UTC-5 (CDT)
- Postal code: 38650
- Area code: 662
- GNIS feature ID: 693179

Enterprise is an unincorporated community located on Mississippi Highway 30 in Union County, Mississippi.

Enterprise is 9.1 miles (14.6 km) south of Myrtle and approximately 10 miles (16 km) west of New Albany.
