= Tula, Mississippi =

- Census-designated place
- Location within Mississippi Location within the United States
- Coordinates: 34°14′10″N 89°21′56″W
- Country: United States
- State: Mississippi
- County: Lafayette

Area
  - Total: 3.82 sq mi (9.89 km^{2})
  - Land: 3.81 sq mi (9.86 km^{2})
  - Water: 0.0077 sq mi (0.02 km^{2})
- Elevation: 404 ft (123 m)

Population (2020)
  - Total: 197
  - Density: 51.7/sq mi (19.98/km^{2})
- Time zone: UTC-6 (Central (CST))
  - Summer (DST): UTC-5 (CDT)
- Area code: 662
- GNIS feature ID: 2812730

Tula is a census-designated place (CDP) and unincorporated community in Lafayette County, Mississippi, United States. Tula is located on Mississippi Highway 331 7.5 miles (12.1 km) west-southwest of Toccopola.

Tula is a name either (sources vary) derived from the Chickasaw language meaning "rock", or a transfer from Tula, in Russia.

Per the 2020 Census, the population was 197.

== History ==
Tula was the location of the Tula Normal Institute and Business College.

It was once believed that Tula was a site of petroleum deposits. Two experimental oil wells existed in 1962, but like many wells in the Lafayette County area they were abandoned before significant investments were made. There were many oil prospects in northern Mississippi which quickly ran dry, causing a large majority of investors to view the Tula wells with caution.

== Demographics ==
Historical population
Census	Pop.	Note	%±
2020	197		—
U.S. Decennial Census; 2020

Tula was first listed as a census designated place in the 2020 U.S. census.

=== 2020 census ===
Tula CDP, Mississippi – Racial and ethnic composition Note: the US Census treats Hispanic/Latino as an ethnic category. This table excludes Latinos from the racial categories and assigns them to a separate category. Hispanics/Latinos may be of any race.
Race / Ethnicity (NH = Non-Hispanic)	Pop 2020	% 2020
White alone (NH)	180	91.37%
Black or African American alone (NH)	7	3.55%
Native American or Alaska Native alone (NH)	0	0.00%
Asian alone (NH)	0	0.00%
Pacific Islander alone (NH)	1	0.51%
Some Other Race alone (NH)	1	0.51%
Mixed Race or Multi-Racial (NH)	6	3.05%
Hispanic or Latino (any race)	2	1.02%
Total	197	100.00%

== Arts and culture ==
The Tula Opry is a bluegrass musical located in Tula.

== Education ==
It is in the Lafayette County School District.

== Notable people ==
- Larry Brown, author. Many of the scenes in his novel Father and Son are set in and around Tula.
- Henry L. Davis, former member of the Mississippi House of Representatives and the Mississippi Senate
