= Etta, Mississippi =

- Unincorporated community
- Location within Mississippi Location within the United States
- Coordinates: 34°28′13″N 89°13′39″W
- Country: United States
- State: Mississippi
- County: Union
- Elevation: 322 ft (98 m)

Population (2010)
  - Total: 1,120
- Time zone: UTC-6 (Central (CST))
  - Summer (DST): UTC-5 (CDT)
- ZIP code: 38627
- Area code: 662
- GNIS feature ID: 693185

Etta is an unincorporated community in Union County, Mississippi, United States. Its ZIP code is 38627. It has a population of 1,120 as of the 2010 Census.
