= Myrtle, Mississippi =

- Town
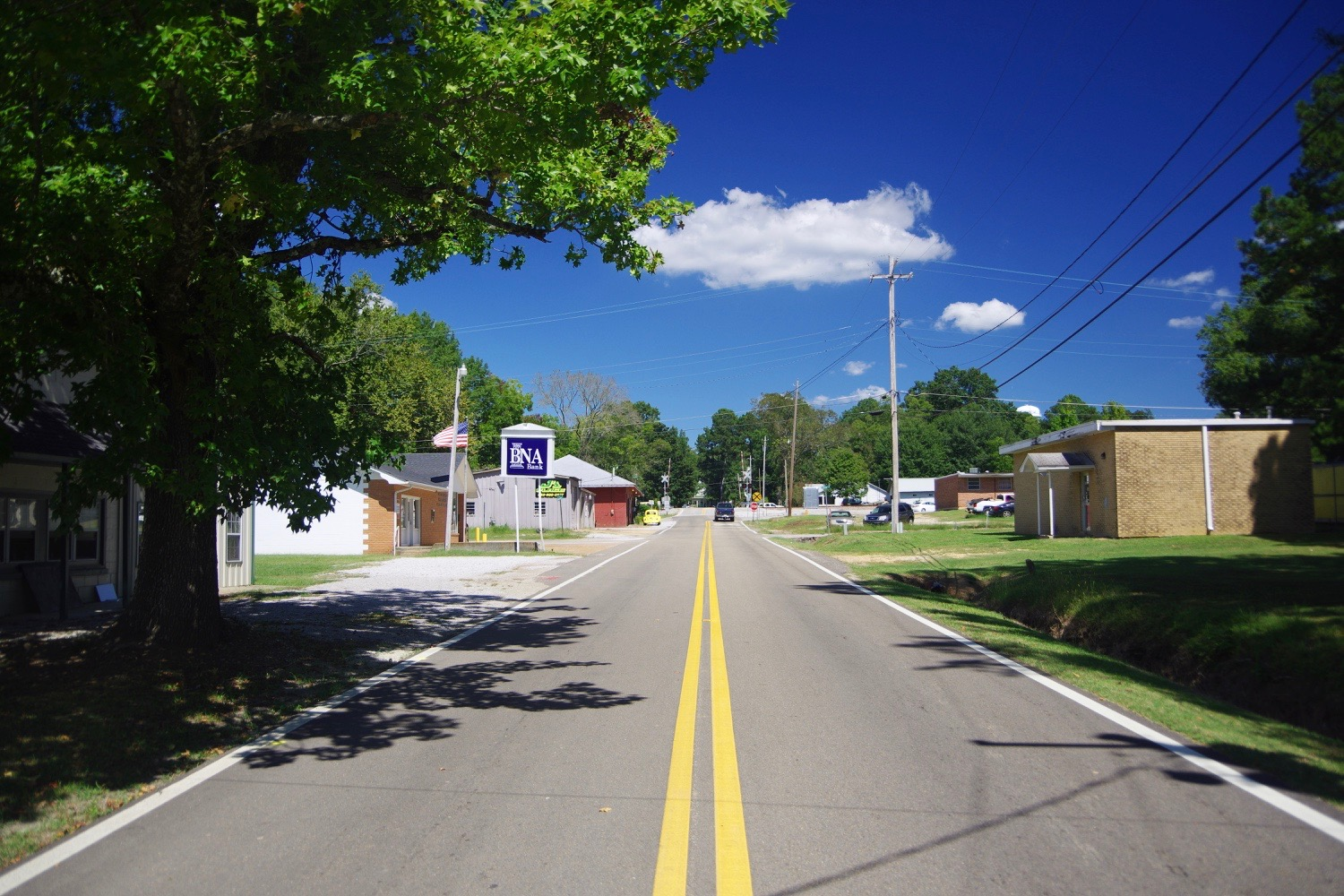
- Springdale Avenue

- Flag

- Location of Myrtle, Mississippi

- Location in the United States
- Coordinates: 34°33′38″N 89°07′20″W
- Country: United States
- State: Mississippi
- County: Union

Area
  - Total: 2.08 sq mi (5.40 km^{2})
  - Land: 2.08 sq mi (5.40 km^{2})
  - Water: 0 sq mi (0.00 km^{2})
- Elevation: 420 ft (130 m)

Population (2020)
  - Total: 484
  - Density: 232.3/sq mi (89.68/km^{2})
- Time zone: UTC-6 (Central (CST))
  - Summer (DST): UTC-5 (CDT)
- ZIP code: 38650
- Area code: 662
- FIPS code: 28-50280
- GNIS feature ID: 2406221

Myrtle is a town in Union County, Mississippi, United States. As of the 2020 census, Myrtle had a population of 484.

== History ==
Myrtle is rooted in a settlement known as "Candy Hill", which was established about 2 miles (3.2 km) south of the town's present location in 1857. When Candy Hill applied for a post office after the Civil War, it changed its name to "Myrtle", after the abundance of myrtle trees growing in the area. Following the construction of the Kansas City, Memphis and Birmingham Railroad in the 1880s, the town shifted northward to its present location.

== Geography ==
Myrtle is located northwest of New Albany along Mississippi Highway 178. Interstate 22 passes through the southern part of town.

According to the United States Census Bureau, the town has a total area of 0.6 square miles (1.6 km^{2}), all land.

== Demographics ==
Historical population
Census	Pop.	Note	%±
1900	165		—
1910	255		54.5%
1920	325		27.5%
1930	313		−3.7%
1940	349		11.5%
1950	331		−5.2%
1960	313		−5.4%
1970	308		−1.6%
1980	402		30.5%
1990	358		−10.9%
2000	407		13.7%
2010	490		20.4%
2020	484		−1.2%
U.S. Decennial Census

As of the census of 2000, there were 407 people, 162 households, and 117 families residing in the town. The population density was 715.6 inhabitants per square mile (276.3/km^{2}). There were 183 housing units at an average density of 321.7 per square mile (124.2/km^{2}). The racial makeup of the town was 85.26% White, 13.02% African American, 1.72% from other races. Hispanic or Latino of any race were 1.72% of the population.

There were 162 households, out of which 42.0% had children under the age of 18 living with them, 48.1% were married couples living together, 19.1% had a female householder with no husband present, and 27.2% were non-families. 25.9% of all households were made up of individuals, and 12.3% had someone living alone who was 65 years of age or older. The average household size was 2.51 and the average family size was 3.01.

In the town, the population was spread out, with 32.7% under the age of 18, 7.9% from 18 to 24, 27.8% from 25 to 44, 18.7% from 45 to 64, and 13.0% who were 65 years of age or older. The median age was 32 years. For every 100 females, there were 79.3 males. For every 100 females age 18 and over, there were 76.8 males.

The median income for a household in the town was $28,125, and the median income for a family was $34,583. Males had a median income of $25,227 versus $20,875 for females. The per capita income for the town was $11,268. About 12.1% of families and 15.3% of the population were below the poverty line, including 15.5% of those under age 18 and 24.4% of those age 65 or over.

== Education ==
The town of Myrtle is served by the Union County School District.

== Notable people ==
- Henry Clay Collins, Mississippi state senator (1916-1920, 1932-1936)
- Armintie Price, WNBA Player
