= William H. Dyson =

American politician

Member of the Mississippi State Senate from the 36th district
- In office January 1916 – January 1920 Serving with Sam Mims Jr. Henry Clay Collins

Personal details
- Born: August 15, 1882 Esperanza, Mississippi, U.S.
- Died: December 11, 1964 (aged 82) Memphis, Tennessee, U.S.
- Party: Democratic
- Children: 2

William Hunter Dyson (August 15, 1882 - December 11, 1964) was an American Democratic politician and barber. He was a member of the Mississippi State Senate, from the 36th District, from 1916 to 1920.

== Biography ==
William Hunter Dyson was born on August 15, 1882, in Esperanza, Mississippi. He was the son of Lewis Woodward Dyson and Fannie Elizabeth (Ellis) Dyson. Dyson attended the country schools, and became a barber by occupation. By 1915, he lived in Hickory Flat, Mississippi. In 1915, he was elected as one of the 36th District's three representatives to the Mississippi State Senate for the 1916-1920 term. Dyson moved to Memphis, Tennessee, in about 1919. He retired from his occupation in 1949. He died on the afternoon of December 11, 1964, at the Mustin Nursing Home in Memphis.

== Personal life ==
Dyson married Sarah Rebecca Johnson in 1902. They had two children, named Christine Leonora and Harold Payne.
