= Bywy Creek (Choctaw County, Mississippi) =

Stream in Mississippi

Coordinates: 33.4631788°N 89.3725706°W

Location
- Country: United States
- State: Mississippi
- County: Choctaw County#

Bywy Creek is a stream in the U.S. state of Mississippi.

Bywy Creek is a name derived from the Choctaw language meaning "leaning white oak". Variant names are "Big Bywiah Creek", "Big Bywy", "Big Bywyah", "By Wy", "By Wyah", and "Bywyah".
