= Toyota Motor Manufacturing Mississippi =

Automobile plant in Mississippi, US

Coordinates: 34°22′50″N 88°53′41″W

Toyota Motor Manufacturing, Mississippi, Inc.

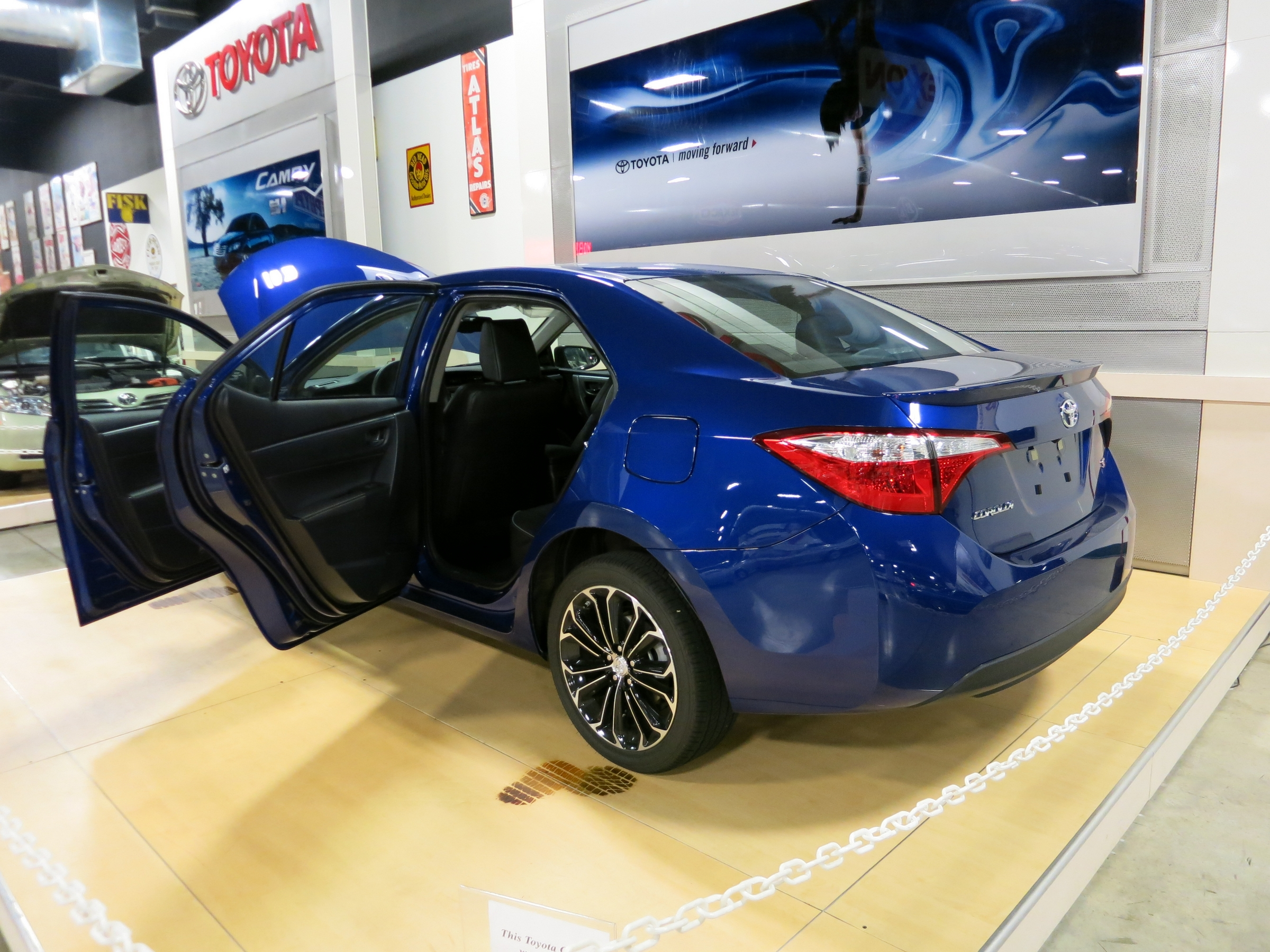
- 2014 Corolla built in Blue Springs on display at the Tupelo Automobile Museum
- Type: Subsidiary
- Industry: Automotive
- Founded: November 17, 2011
- Headquarters: Blue Springs, Mississippi, United States
- Key people: Aaron Foster (president)
- Products: Toyota Corolla
- Number of employees: 2,250 (2022)
- Parent: Toyota Motor North America

Toyota Motor Manufacturing Mississippi (TMMMS) is a Toyota manufacturing facility located in Blue Springs, Mississippi that opened in October 2011. It is a subsidiary of Toyota Motor North America, itself a subsidiary of Toyota Motor Corporation of Japan. The facility currently produces the Toyota Corolla for the North American market. The plant has the capacity to produce 170,000 vehicles per year and employs more than 2,000 people.

== History ==
Toyota announced on February 27, 2007, that it would build its fourteenth North American plant in Blue Springs, Mississippi. The plan was to employ about 2,000 people to build the Highlander SUV beginning in 2010 at an annual capacity of 150,000 vehicles per year. A groundbreaking ceremony for the facility was held on April 18, 2007.

In July 2008, Toyota announced that the Prius would be produced at the plant instead as the Highlander would instead be produced at the Toyota Princeton, Indiana plant replacing the Sequoia that would move production to the San Antonio, Texas plant.

Construction of the plant was put on hold on December 15, 2008, due to the Great Recession in the United States. Construction resumed on June 17, 2010, and at that time, Toyota announced that the plant would now produce the Toyota Corolla instead of the Prius, replacing the NUMMI plant in Fremont, California which closed on April 1, 2010.

The plant began production of the Corolla on October 10, 2011, and the first vehicle rolled off the production line on November 17, 2011. A second shift was added to the plant on February 6, 2012.

The plant built nearly 1.2 million 11th generation Corollas, with the last rolling off the production line on February 22, 2019. The plant spent a few weeks preparing to produce the all-new 12th-generation Corolla, which is built on the new Toyota New Global Architecture platform. The first 12th generation Corolla was completed on March 18, 2019.

== Products made ==
- Toyota Corolla (2011–present)

Annual Corolla Production at TMMMS, 2011–present
Year	Production	±%
2011	1,967	—
2012	129,602	+6488.8%
2013	158,647	+22.4%
2014	189,314	+19.3%
2015	190,514	+0.6%
2016	182,025	−4.5%
2017	163,832	−10.0%
2018	136,108	−16.9%
2019	157,000	+15.3%
2020		—
2021	128,297	—
2022	132,684	+3.4%
2023	156,219	+17.7%
2024	180,197	+15.3%
