= Sarepta, Mississippi =

- Unincorporated community
- Location in Mississippi
- Coordinates: 34°07′28″N 89°17′15″W
- Country: United States
- State: Mississippi
- County: Calhoun
- Founded: September 19, 1835
- Elevation: 410 ft (120 m)
- Time zone: UTC-6 (Central (CST))
  - Summer (DST): UTC-5 (CDT)
- ZIP code: 38864
- Area code: 662
- GNIS feature ID: 677422
- Highways: Highway 9
- Major airport: Memphis Airport (MEM)

Sarepta is an unincorporated community in Calhoun County, Mississippi, United States. Founded in 1835, it is located along Mississippi Highway 9, 9.8 miles (15.8 km) north-northeast of Bruce.

== Notable people ==
- Don Grist (1935–2022), Mississippi judge and state legislator, was born in Sarepta.
