= Endville, Mississippi =

Endville
- Unincorporated community
- Endville's position in Mississippi.
- Coordinates: 34°19′20″N 88°52′59″W
- Country: United States
- State: Mississippi
- County: Pontotoc
- Elevation: 440 ft (130 m)
- Time zone: UTC-6 (Central (CST))
  - Summer (DST): UTC-5 (CDT)
- GNIS feature ID: 669777

Endville (also, Enville) is an unincorporated community in Pontotoc County, Mississippi, United States.

A post office operated under the name Endville from 1900 to 1904.

On April 27, 2011, a tornado hit Endville as part of the 2011 Super Outbreak. The tornado was rated EF0, with estimated wind speeds of 70 mph (110 km/h; 61 kn). The tornado downed several trees and damaged a couple of houses; its path of destruction was 75 yards (69 m) wide and the tornado travelled a path of 1.02 miles (1.64 km).
