= Sam Mims Jr. =

American politician

- c. 1916

Member of the Mississippi Senate from the 36th district
- In office January 1916 – January 1920 Serving with William H. Dyson; Henry C. Collins

Personal details
- Born: November 27, 1880 Marshall County, MS
- Died: December 12, 1946 (aged 66)
- Party: Democrat
- Spouse: Virginia Stone (m. 1915)
- Relations: Sam Mims V (great-grandson)

Samuel Cochran Mims, Jr. (November 27, 1880 - December 12, 1946) was a Mississippi state senator, representing the state's 36th district as a Democrat, from 1916 to 1920.

== Biography ==
Samuel Cochran Mims, Jr. was born on November 27, 1880, in Chulahoma, Marshall County, Mississippi. He was the son of Samuel Cochran Mims and Jessie (Thompson) Mims. Mims Sr. was a member of the Board of Supervisors of Marshall County. In 1892, his family moved to Byhalia, Mississippi. Mims Jr. then graduated from the University of Mississippi. He was admitted to the bar in 1909. He began practicing law after that. He served as the County Attorney of Marshall County from May 1910 to December 1915. In 1915, he was elected to the Mississippi State Senate for the 1916–1920 term, as one of the three senators representing the 36th district and the senator representing Marshall County in that district. Later, he resided in Grenada, Mississippi, where he continued to practice law. Mims died on December 12, 1946, and was buried in Woodlawn Cemetery in Grenada, Mississippi.

== Personal life ==
Mims married Virginia Stone in 1915. They had a son named Samuel Cochran Mims, III. Mims Jr's great-grandson, and Mims III's grandson, Sam C. Mims V, also served in the Mississippi State Legislature.
