= Hurricane, Mississippi =

Hurricane
- Unincorporated community
- Hurricane's position in Mississippi
- Coordinates: 34°21′04″N 89°08′52″W
- Country: United States
- State: Mississippi
- County: Pontotoc
- Elevation: 354 ft (108 m)
- Time zone: UTC-6 (Central (CST))
  - Summer (DST): UTC-5 (CDT)
- GNIS feature ID: 693562

Hurricane is an unincorporated community in Pontotoc County, Mississippi, United States. It was originally called Esperanza, but the name changed due to being impacted by several severe storms.

== History ==
The Esperanza Post Office was established in 1871 and continued into the early 1900s. The population in 1900 was 26. But sometime before 1900, the inhabitants began calling the community "Hurricane" after it was hit by a hurricane season storm from the Gulf of Mexico. The New Prospect Baptist Church, originally housed in a 1880s wood building, was renamed Hurricane Baptist in 1940 when a two-story brick building replaced the prior structure.

On April 27, 2011, a tornado touched down in the Esperanza area as part of the 2011 Super Outbreak, but apparently caused no damage.
