= Alpine, Mississippi =

- Unincorporated community
- Location within Mississippi Location within the United States
- Coordinates: 34°29′43″N 88°47′52″W
- Country: United States
- State: Mississippi
- County: Union
- Elevation: 420 ft (130 m)
- Time zone: UTC-6 (Central (CST))
  - Summer (DST): UTC-5 (CDT)
- Area code: 662
- GNIS feature ID: 666235

Alpine is an unincorporated community in Union County, Mississippi.

== The Bain Murders of 2012 ==
On May 10, 2012, the bodies of Jo Ann Bain (31) and her oldest daughter Adrienne (14), who allegedly were murdered by Adam Christopher Mayes on April 27, 2012, were found buried in a shallow grave behind the mobile home of Mary Mayes, Adam's mother, in Alpine.
