= Sherman, Mississippi =

- Town
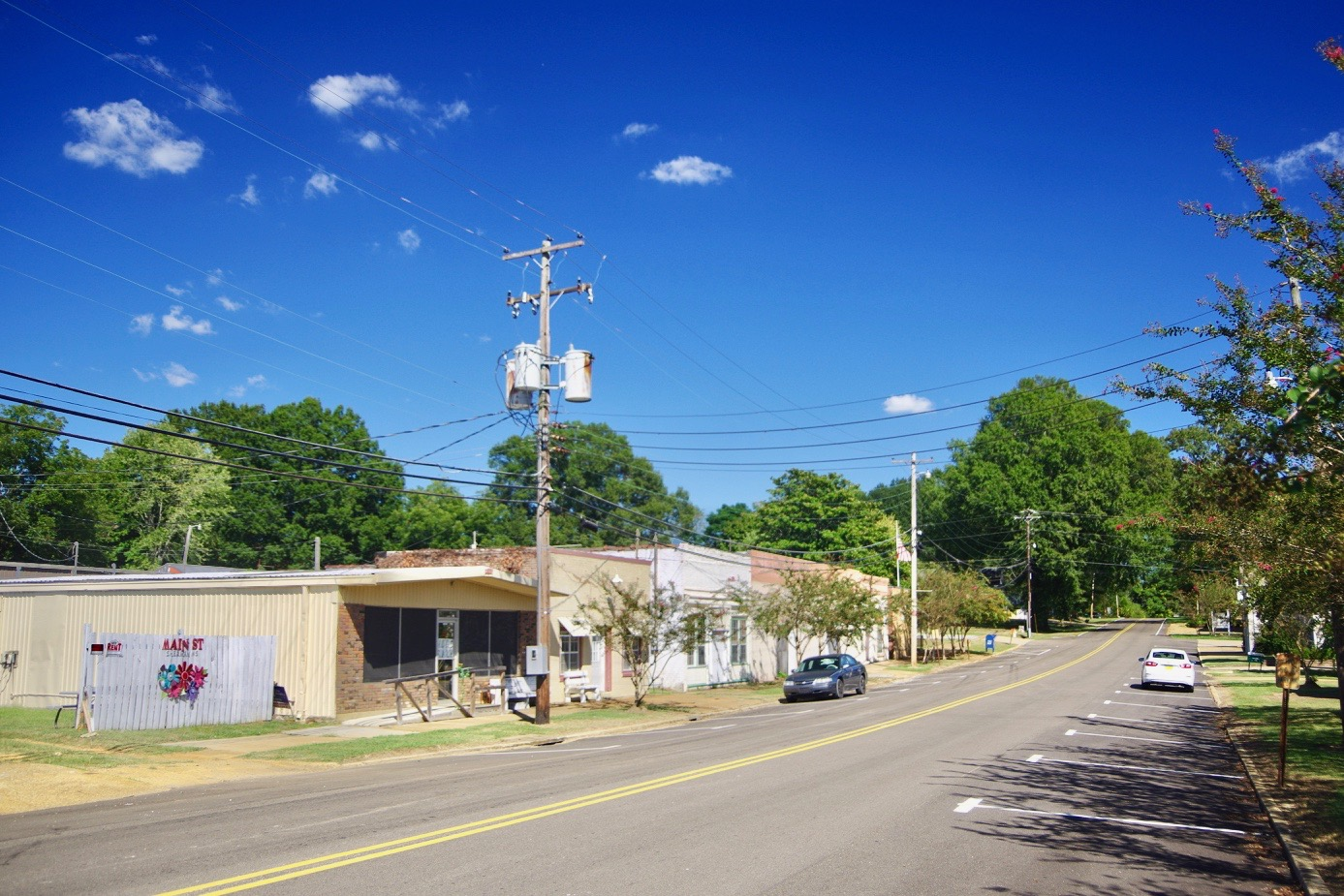
- Main Street

- Flag Logo

- Location of Sherman, Mississippi

- Location in the United States
- Coordinates: 34°22′12″N 88°50′44″W
- Country: United States
- State: Mississippi
- Counties: Pontotoc, Union, Lee

Area
  - Total: 1.74 sq mi (4.51 km^{2})
  - Land: 1.74 sq mi (4.51 km^{2})
  - Water: 0 sq mi (0.00 km^{2})
- Elevation: 367 ft (112 m)

Population (2020)
  - Total: 600
  - Density: 344.6/sq mi (133.04/km^{2})
- Time zone: UTC-6 (Central (CST))
  - Summer (DST): UTC-5 (CDT)
- ZIP code: 38869
- Area code: 662
- FIPS code: 28-67200
- GNIS feature ID: 2407325
- Website: shermanms.gov

Sherman is a town which straddles Lee, Pontotoc, and Union counties in Mississippi. The population was 600 at the 2020 census.

== History ==
In 1840 Reuben Jones and John Witt settled what is now the Sherman community fourteen miles northeast of Pontotoc, however the town owes its formation and growth to the building of the old Kansas City, Memphis and Birmingham Railroad. When the operation of trains was begun on the newly built railroad in 1886 a station was established and named Sherman by a resident who had formerly lived in Sherman, Texas. R.P. Kelly built the first home in the spring of 1886. Other citizens and businessmen of the town were John Witt, J.E. Wade, and John Johnson.

The Mississippi Normal Institute was founded in 1889 by Professor J.N. Davis and a boarding house was maintained in connection with the institute. The institute flourished for several years with an enrollment of 300 but with the development of the public school system its patronage dwindled and about 1903 it was consolidated with the public school at Sherman.

The following excerpt from the Pontotoc Democrat of September 19, 1890, describes the town: "Ninety-four miles from Memphis, 158 miles from Birmingham on the K C M & B Railroad is the thriving little town of Sherman. Her population has almost doubled in the last twelve months. She is surrounded by the best fanning lands in the State. She has 35 dwellings, 6 stores, 2 doctors, no graveyards, a ~40,000 school building and destined to be the Jupiter in the educational world.”

== Geography ==
Sherman lies northwest of Tupelo, and is concentrated in an area north of Interstate 22 and south of Mississippi Highway 178. Most of the town is in Pontotoc County with a portion extending north into Union County and a tiny portion extending east into Lee County. In the 2000 census, 425 of the town's 548 residents (77.6%) lived in Pontotoc County, 122 (22.3%) in Union County, and 1 (0.2%) in Lee County. According to the United States Census Bureau, the town has a total area of 1.9 square miles (4.8 km^{2}), all land.

== Demographics ==
Historical population
Census	Pop.	Note	%±
1890	79		—
1900	300		279.7%
1910	353		17.7%
1920	421		19.3%
1930	464		10.2%
1940	449		−3.2%
1950	386		−14.0%
1960	403		4.4%
1970	468		16.1%
1980	499		6.6%
1990	528		5.8%
2000	548		3.8%
2010	650		18.6%
2020	600		−7.7%
U.S. Decennial Census

=== 2020 census ===
Sherman Racial Composition
Race	Num.	Perc.
White	409	68.17%
Black or African American	136	22.67%
Native American	1	0.17%
Asian	5	0.83%
Pacific Islander	1	0.17%
Other/Mixed	30	5.0%
Hispanic or Latino	18	3.0%

As of the 2020 United States Census, there were 600 people, 289 households, and 180 families residing in the town.

=== 2000 census ===
As of the census of 2000, there were 548 people, 241 households, and 153 families residing in the town. The population density was 293.6 inhabitants per square mile (113.4/km^{2}). There were 263 housing units at an average density of 140.9 per square mile (54.4/km^{2}). The racial makeup of the town was 83.39% White, 16.06% African American, 0.36% Native American, and 0.18% from two or more races. Hispanic or Latino of any race were 0.36% of the population.

There were 241 households, out of which 29.5% had children under the age of 18 living with them, 46.9% were married couples living together, 14.1% had a female householder with no husband present, and 36.5% were non-families. 34.4% of all households were made up of individuals, and 14.9% had someone living alone who was 65 years of age or older. The average household size was 2.27 and the average family size was 2.95.

In the town, the population was spread out, with 25.5% under the age of 18, 7.5% from 18 to 24, 29.0% from 25 to 44, 24.1% from 45 to 64, and 13.9% who were 65 years of age or older. The median age was 37 years. For every 100 females, there were 83.9 males. For every 100 females age 18 and over, there were 76.6 males.

The median income for a household in the town was $21,667, and the median income for a family was $29,844. Males had a median income of $29,038 versus $18,958 for females. The per capita income for the town was $11,301. About 20.4% of families and 20.9% of the population were below the poverty line, including 19.0% of those under age 18 and 22.7% of those age 65 or over.

== Education ==
The town of Sherman is served by three school districts based on the county the land resides in. Most of the town is served by the Pontotoc County School District, while the Union County portion is served by the Union County School District. The Lee County School District serves the small portion of Sherman that lies in Lee County.

== Government ==
The town's government is headed by the mayor and five aldermen who serve four-year terms.

== Notable person ==
- Dode Criss, former Major League Baseball pitcher
