= Union County, Mississippi =

County in Mississippi, United States

- County
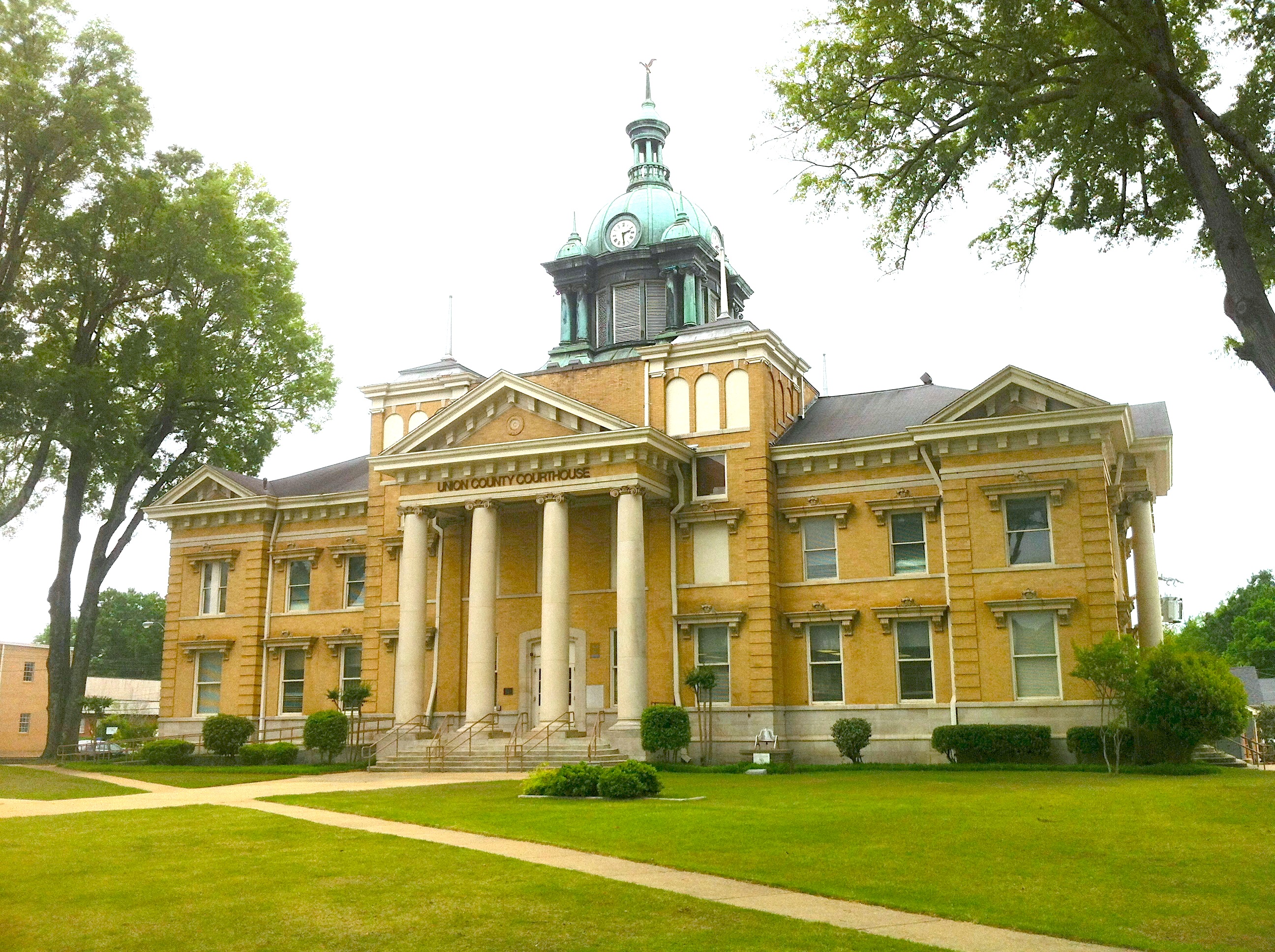
- The Union County Courthouse in New Albany

- Location within the U.S. state of Mississippi
- Coordinates: 34°29′N 89°00′W
- Country: United States
- State: Mississippi
- Founded: July 7, 1870
- Seat: New Albany
- Largest city: New Albany

Area
  - Total: 417 sq mi (1,080 km^{2})
  - Land: 416 sq mi (1,080 km^{2})
  - Water: 1.3 sq mi (3.4 km^{2}) 0.3%

Population (2020)
  - Total: 27,777
  - Estimate (2025): 28,459 ▲
  - Density: 66.8/sq mi (25.8/km^{2})
- Time zone: UTC−6 (Central)
  - Summer (DST): UTC−5 (CDT)
- Congressional district: 1st
- Website: unioncoms.com

Union County is a county located in the U.S. state of Mississippi. It was formed in 1870 from Tippah and Pontotoc counties, and in 1874 a portion of Lee County was added. As of the 2020 census, the population was 27,777. Its county seat is New Albany. According to most sources, the county received its name by being a union of pieces of several large counties, like other Union counties in other states. However, other sources say that the name was meant to mark the re-union of Mississippi and the other Confederate states after the Civil War (at the time, the state had a Republican government under Reconstruction).

== Geography ==
According to the U.S. Census Bureau, the county has a total area of 417 square miles (1,080 km^{2}), of which 416 square miles (1,080 km^{2}) is land and 1.3 square miles (3.4 km^{2}) (0.3%) is water.

=== Major highways ===
- Interstate 22
- U.S. Route 78
- Mississippi Highway 9
- Mississippi Highway 15
- Mississippi Highway 30
- Mississippi Highway 178
- Mississippi Highway 348
- Mississippi Highway 349
- Mississippi Highway 355

=== Adjacent counties ===
- Benton County (north)
- Tippah County (north)
- Prentiss County (east)
- Lee County (southeast)
- Pontotoc County (south)
- Lafayette County (southwest)
- Marshall County (northwest)

=== National protected area ===
- Holly Springs National Forest (part)

== Demographics ==
Historical population
Census	Pop.	Note	%±
1880	13,030		—
1890	15,606		19.8%
1900	16,522		5.9%
1910	18,997		15.0%
1920	20,044		5.5%
1930	21,268		6.1%
1940	21,867		2.8%
1950	20,262		−7.3%
1960	18,904		−6.7%
1970	19,096		1.0%
1980	21,741		13.9%
1990	22,085		1.6%
2000	25,362		14.8%
2010	27,134		7.0%
2020	27,777		2.4%
2025 (est.)	28,459	▲	2.5%
U.S. Decennial Census; 1790-1960 1900-1990; 1990-2000 2010-2013

=== Racial and ethnic composition ===
Union County, Mississippi – Racial and ethnic composition Note: the US Census treats Hispanic/Latino as an ethnic category. This table excludes Latinos from the racial categories and assigns them to a separate category. Hispanics/Latinos may be of any race.
Race / Ethnicity (NH = Non-Hispanic)	Pop 1980	Pop 1990	Pop 2000	Pop 2010	Pop 2020	% 1980	% 1990	% 2000	% 2010	% 2020
White alone (NH)	18,595	18,744	20,969	21,649	21,560	85.53%	84.87%	82.68%	79.79%	77.62%
Black or African American alone (NH)	2,974	3,202	3,784	3,911	3,950	13.68%	14.50%	14.92%	14.41%	14.22%
Native American or Alaska Native alone (NH)	18	9	32	29	27	0.08%	0.04%	0.13%	0.11%	0.10%
Asian alone (NH)	10	25	38	46	109	0.05%	0.11%	0.15%	0.17%	0.39%
Native Hawaiian or Pacific Islander alone (NH)	x	x	1	5	0	x	x	0.00%	0.02%	0.00%
Other race alone (NH)	4	2	5	16	76	0.02%	0.01%	0.02%	0.06%	0.27%
Mixed race or Multiracial (NH)	x	x	120	268	754	x	x	0.47%	0.99%	2.71%
Hispanic or Latino (any race)	140	103	413	1,210	1,301	0.64%	0.47%	1.63%	4.46%	4.68%
Total	21,741	22,085	25,362	27,134	27,777	100.00%	100.00%	100.00%	100.00%	100.00%

=== 2020 census ===
As of the 2020 census, the county had a population of 27,777. The median age was 40.2 years. 24.0% of residents were under the age of 18 and 18.2% of residents were 65 years of age or older. For every 100 females there were 94.7 males, and for every 100 females age 18 and over there were 93.1 males age 18 and over.

The racial makeup of the county was 78.3% White, 14.3% Black or African American, 0.2% American Indian and Alaska Native, 0.4% Asian, <0.1% Native Hawaiian and Pacific Islander, 3.2% from some other race, and 3.5% from two or more races. Hispanic or Latino residents of any race comprised 4.7% of the population.

24.3% of residents lived in urban areas, while 75.7% lived in rural areas.

There were 10,809 households in the county, of which 32.3% had children under the age of 18 living in them. Of all households, 50.8% were married-couple households, 17.7% were households with a male householder and no spouse or partner present, and 26.7% were households with a female householder and no spouse or partner present. About 26.6% of all households were made up of individuals and 12.3% had someone living alone who was 65 years of age or older.

There were 12,119 housing units, of which 10.8% were vacant. Among occupied housing units, 73.5% were owner-occupied and 26.5% were renter-occupied. The homeowner vacancy rate was 1.0% and the rental vacancy rate was 13.9%.

=== 2000 census ===
As of the census of 2000, there were 25,362 people, 9,786 households, and 7,241 families residing in the county. The population density was 61 people per square mile (24 people/km^{2}). There were 10,693 housing units at an average density of 26 units per square mile (10 units/km^{2}). The racial makeup of the county was 83.42% White, 14.95% Black or African American, 0.13% Native American, 0.20% Asian, 0.02% Pacific Islander, 0.67% from other races, and 0.62% from two or more races. 1.63% of the population were Hispanic or Latino of any race.

As of the census of 2000, there were 9,786 households, out of which 34.70% had children under the age of 18 living with them, 58.90% were married couples living together, 11.10% had a female householder with no husband present, and 26.00% were non-families. 23.40% of all households were made up of individuals, and 11.30% had someone living alone who was 65 years of age or older. The average household size was 2.57 and the average family size was 3.02.

In the county, the population was spread out, with 25.90% under the age of 18, 9.20% from 18 to 24, 28.50% from 25 to 44, 22.20% from 45 to 64, and 14.10% who were 65 years of age or older. The median age was 36 years. For every 100 females there were 93.80 males. For every 100 females age 18 and over, there were 90.00 males.

The median income for a household in the county was $32,682, and the median income for a family was $39,777. Males had a median income of $29,087 versus $21,418 for females. The per capita income for the county was $15,700. About 9.60% of families and 12.60% of the population were below the poverty line, including 14.10% of those under age 18 and 20.80% of those age 65 or over.

== Communities ==
=== City ===
- New Albany (county seat and largest municipality)

=== Towns ===
- Myrtle
- Sherman (partly in Pontotoc County and Lee County)

=== Village ===
- Blue Springs

=== Unincorporated communities ===
- Alpine
- Enterprise
- Etta
- Ingomar
- Jugfork
- Keownville
- New Harmony
- Wallerville

== Education ==
There are two school districts: New Albany Public Schools and Union County School District.

Northeast Mississippi Community College is the community college for Union County.

== Politics ==
A solidly Democratic county through 1960, Union County has since trended powerfully Republican. The last Democrat to carry the county, and indeed to win over 40% of its vote, was Jimmy Carter in 1980.

United States presidential election results for Union County, Mississippi
Year	Republican		Democratic		Third party(ies)	
Year	No.	%	No.	%	No.	%
1912	23	2.13%	962	89.24%	93	8.63%
1916	89	5.05%	1,666	94.50%	8	0.45%
1920	429	25.77%	1,224	73.51%	12	0.72%
1924	135	6.85%	1,750	88.79%	86	4.36%
1928	324	14.85%	1,858	85.15%	0	0.00%
1932	74	3.15%	2,264	96.50%	8	0.34%
1936	63	2.72%	2,249	97.11%	4	0.17%
1940	108	3.96%	2,609	95.71%	9	0.33%
1944	183	7.88%	2,140	92.12%	0	0.00%
1948	63	3.21%	478	24.34%	1,423	72.45%
1952	917	25.01%	2,749	74.99%	0	0.00%
1956	427	12.22%	2,882	82.48%	185	5.29%
1960	605	18.36%	2,001	60.73%	689	20.91%
1964	2,939	70.38%	1,237	29.62%	0	0.00%
1968	948	14.00%	624	9.22%	5,198	76.78%
1972	5,477	87.91%	658	10.56%	95	1.52%
1976	2,507	32.73%	5,021	65.56%	131	1.71%
1980	3,545	40.68%	5,001	57.38%	169	1.94%
1984	5,837	67.74%	2,766	32.10%	14	0.16%
1988	5,511	64.15%	3,044	35.43%	36	0.42%
1992	5,173	53.10%	3,714	38.12%	855	8.78%
1996	4,375	51.14%	3,316	38.76%	864	10.10%
2000	6,087	65.37%	3,094	33.23%	130	1.40%
2004	7,906	73.08%	2,839	26.24%	74	0.68%
2008	9,072	74.39%	2,985	24.48%	138	1.13%
2012	8,498	74.77%	2,742	24.13%	125	1.10%
2016	9,235	80.33%	2,012	17.50%	249	2.17%
2020	10,373	81.79%	2,160	17.03%	150	1.18%
2024	10,559	84.62%	1,807	14.48%	112	0.90%

== See also ==
- National Register of Historic Places listings in Union County, Mississippi
