= Blue Springs, Mississippi =

- Village
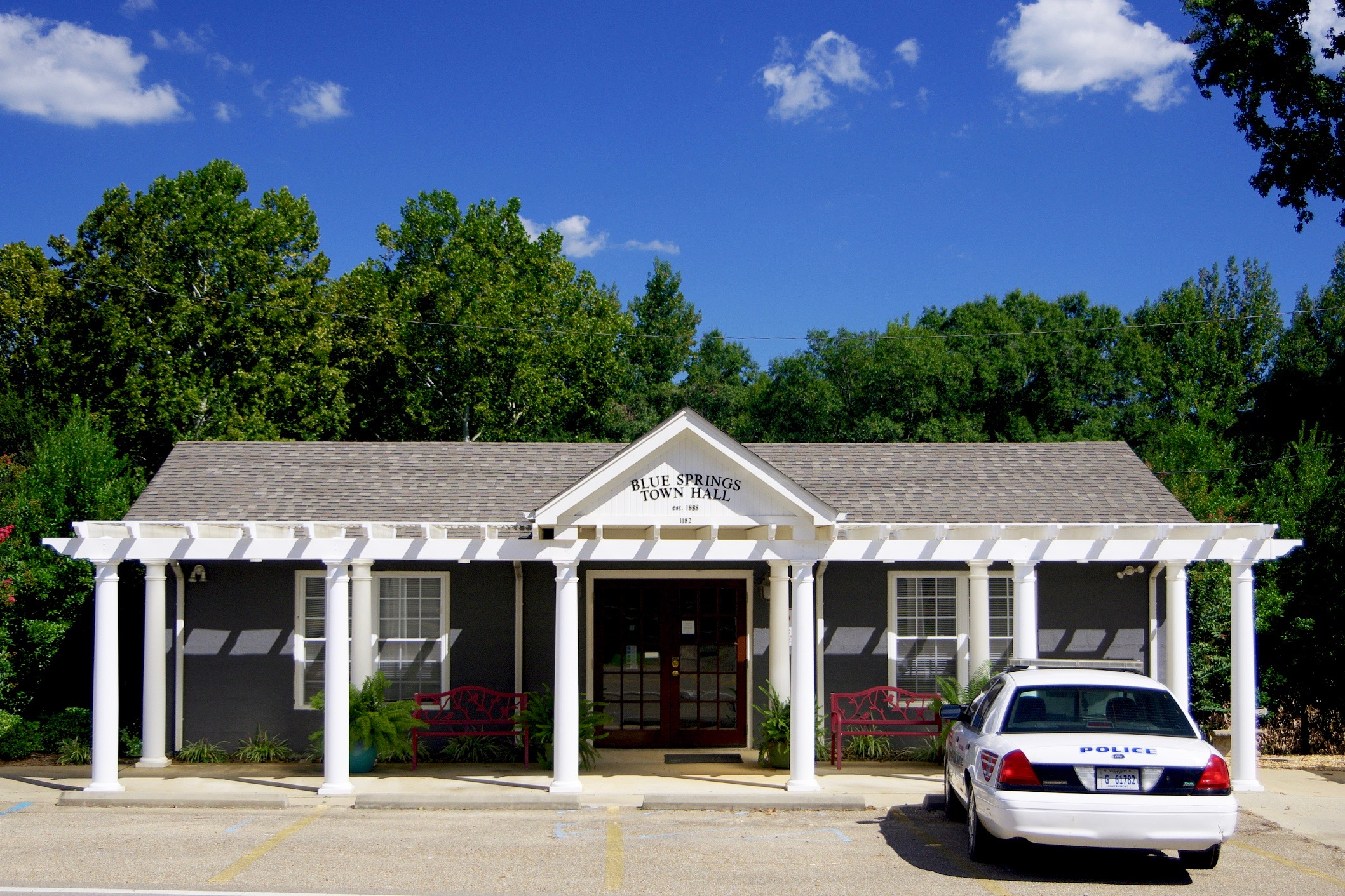
- Town Hall

- Flag

- Location of Blue Springs, Mississippi

- Location in the United States
- Coordinates: 34°24′11″N 88°52′22″W
- Country: United States
- State: Mississippi
- County: Union
- Established: 1888

Government
  - Mayor: Rita Gentry

Area
  - Total: 4.50 sq mi (11.66 km^{2})
  - Land: 4.47 sq mi (11.59 km^{2})
  - Water: 0.023 sq mi (0.06 km^{2})
- Elevation: 404 ft (123 m)

Population (2020)
  - Total: 436
  - Density: 97.4/sq mi (37.61/km^{2})
- Time zone: UTC-6 (Central (CST))
  - Summer (DST): UTC-5 (CDT)
- ZIP code: 38828
- Area code: 662
- FIPS code: 28-07100
- GNIS feature ID: 0667322
- Website: www.townofbluespringsms.com

Blue Springs is a village in Union County, Mississippi, United States. Located near Tupelo in northeastern Mississippi, the village had a population of 436 at the 2020 census. It is the site of Toyota Motor Manufacturing Mississippi, Toyota's eighth North American vehicle assembly plant.

== History ==
Blue Springs was established in 1888 as a stop along the Kansas City, Memphis and Birmingham Railroad. Many of the first residents were from the older nearby community of Ellistown, which had been bypassed by the railroad.

== Geography ==
Blue Springs is located along Mississippi Highway 9 northwest of Tupelo. The town of Sherman lies just to the southeast. Interstate 22 and Mississippi Highway 178 pass southwest of Blue Springs, connecting the area with Tupelo to the southeast and New Albany to the northwest.

According to the United States Census Bureau, the village has a total area of 1.0 square mile (2.6 km^{2}), all land.

== Demographics ==
Historical population
Census	Pop.	Note	%±
1900	198		—
1910	167		−15.7%
1920	167		0.0%
1930	171		2.4%
1940	183		7.0%
1950	125		−31.7%
1960	99		−20.8%
1970	125		26.3%
1980	131		4.8%
1990	140		6.9%
2000	144		2.9%
2010	228		58.3%
2020	436		91.2%
U.S. Decennial Census

As of the census of 2000, there were 144 people, 53 households, and 34 families residing in the village. The population density was 139.8 inhabitants per square mile (54.0/km^{2}). There were 56 housing units at an average density of 54.4 per square mile (21.0/km^{2}). The racial makeup of the village was 93.06% White, 6.25% African American and 0.69% Native American. Hispanic or Latino of any race were 2.08% of the population.

There were 53 households, out of which 32.1% had children under the age of 18 living with them, 54.7% were married couples living together, 11.3% had a female householder with no husband present, and 34.0% were non-families. 30.2% of all households were made up of individuals, and 9.4% had someone living alone who was 65 years of age or older. The average household size was 2.72 and the average family size was 3.46.

In the village, the population was spread out, with 21.5% under the age of 18, 10.4% from 18 to 24, 34.7% from 25 to 44, 20.1% from 45 to 64, and 13.2% who were 65 years of age or older. The median age was 38 years. For every 100 females, there were 89.5 males. For every 100 females age 18 and over, there were 94.8 males.

The median income for a household in the village was $41,250, and the median income for a family was $52,188. Males had a median income of $30,938 versus $26,000 for females. The per capita income for the village was $16,257. There were none of the families and 4.0% of the population living below the poverty line, including no under eighteens and 33.3% of those over 64.

== Economy ==
Blue Springs is the site of Toyota's eighth North American vehicle assembly plant, Toyota Motor Manufacturing Mississippi. The plant was slated to produce the company's Prius hybrid vehicle beginning in 2010. Groundbreaking for the facility was held on April 18, 2007. After the economy collapsed the construction of the new plant was put on hold. Construction of the plant restarted in June 2010, with a promise of 2,000 jobs for the economically hard hit area. Due to falling gas prices, the Toyota Prius will no longer be produced there, but rather the Toyota Corolla which was previously produced at NUMMI.

== Education ==
The Village of Blue Springs is served by the Union County School District.
