= Bankhead Highway =

Auto trail

Bankhead Highway

Route information
- Existed: 1916–present

Major junctions
- West end: Corners of 5th Avenue and Broadway in downtown San Diego, California
- East end: Zero Milestone in Washington, D.C.

Location
- Country: United States

Highway system
- Auto trails

The Bankhead Highway was a United States cross-country automobile highway connecting Washington, D.C., and San Diego, California. The Bankhead Highway's beginnings can be traced back to 1916 when the Bankhead Highway Association was organized to promote the highway's development. It was part of the National Auto Trail system. The road was named for Alabama politician John H. Bankhead, a leader in the early national road-building movement. In later years, several stretches of U.S. Route 78 in northwest Alabama were renamed for Bankhead's son, former U.S. representative and speaker of the House William B. Bankhead.

== Route description ==
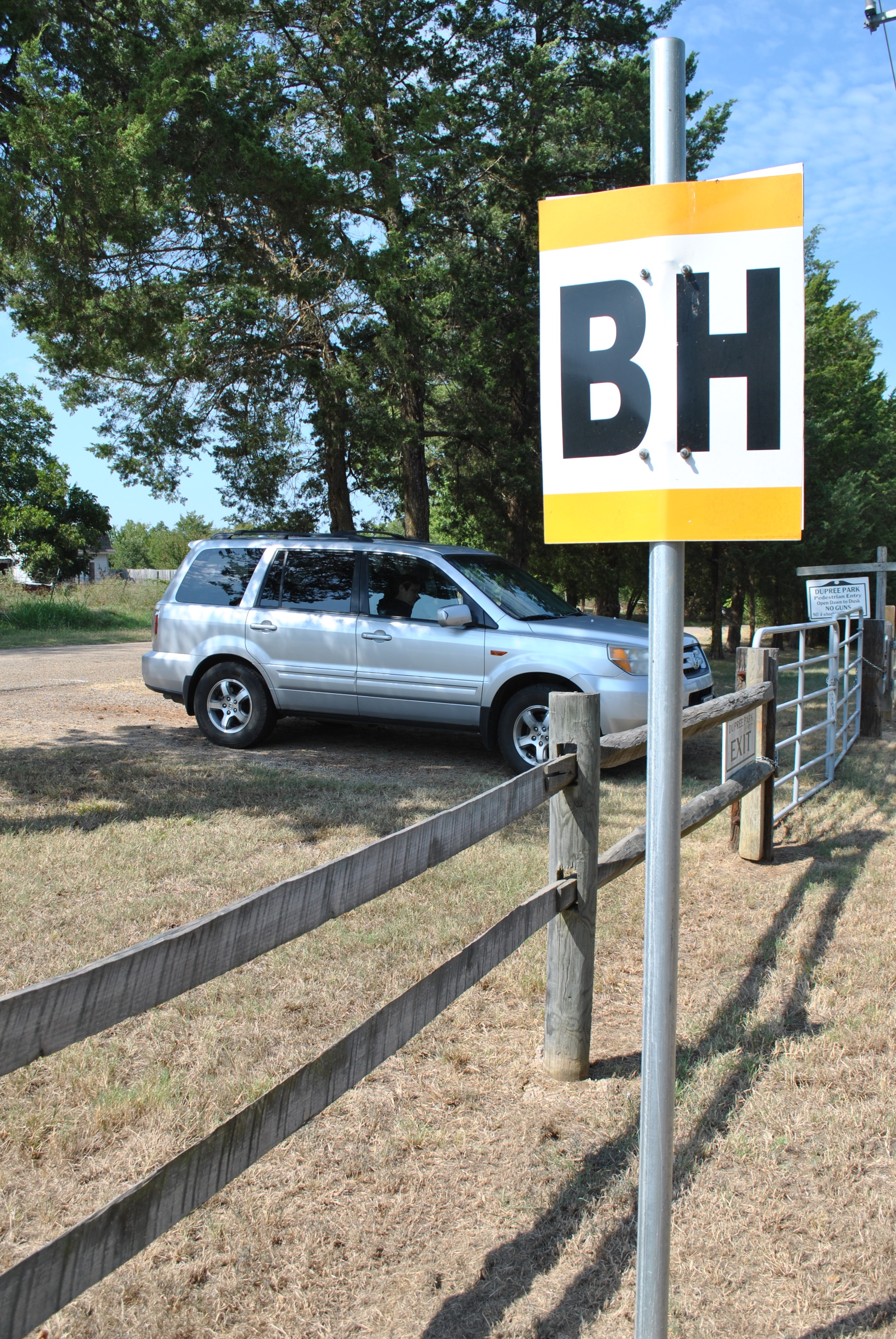
BH signpost, Texas

As was common with early auto trails, the Bankhead Highway had several different routes. The main and branch routes below are considered to be the primary configurations of the highway.

=== California ===
The route followed the former US 80 from San Diego and through La Mesa, El Cajon, and El Centro before crossing into Arizona. This section of the Bankhead Highway is now a California state historic highway.

=== Arizona ===
In Arizona, the route followed what is Interstate 8 today from the California state line. Continuing as former US 80, it followed through Gila Bend and smaller towns on the west side of Phoenix. It then went through Phoenix on Van Buren Street then Tempe and Mesa. It then followed US 60 and then Arizona State Route 79 to Arizona State Route 77 to Tucson.

=== New Mexico ===
(For details on the branch routes in New Mexico, see branch route and third route entries for Texas/New Mexico).

In New Mexico, the Bankhead route followed the former US 80 (now I-10 from Arizona and then through Las Cruces.

=== Texas ===
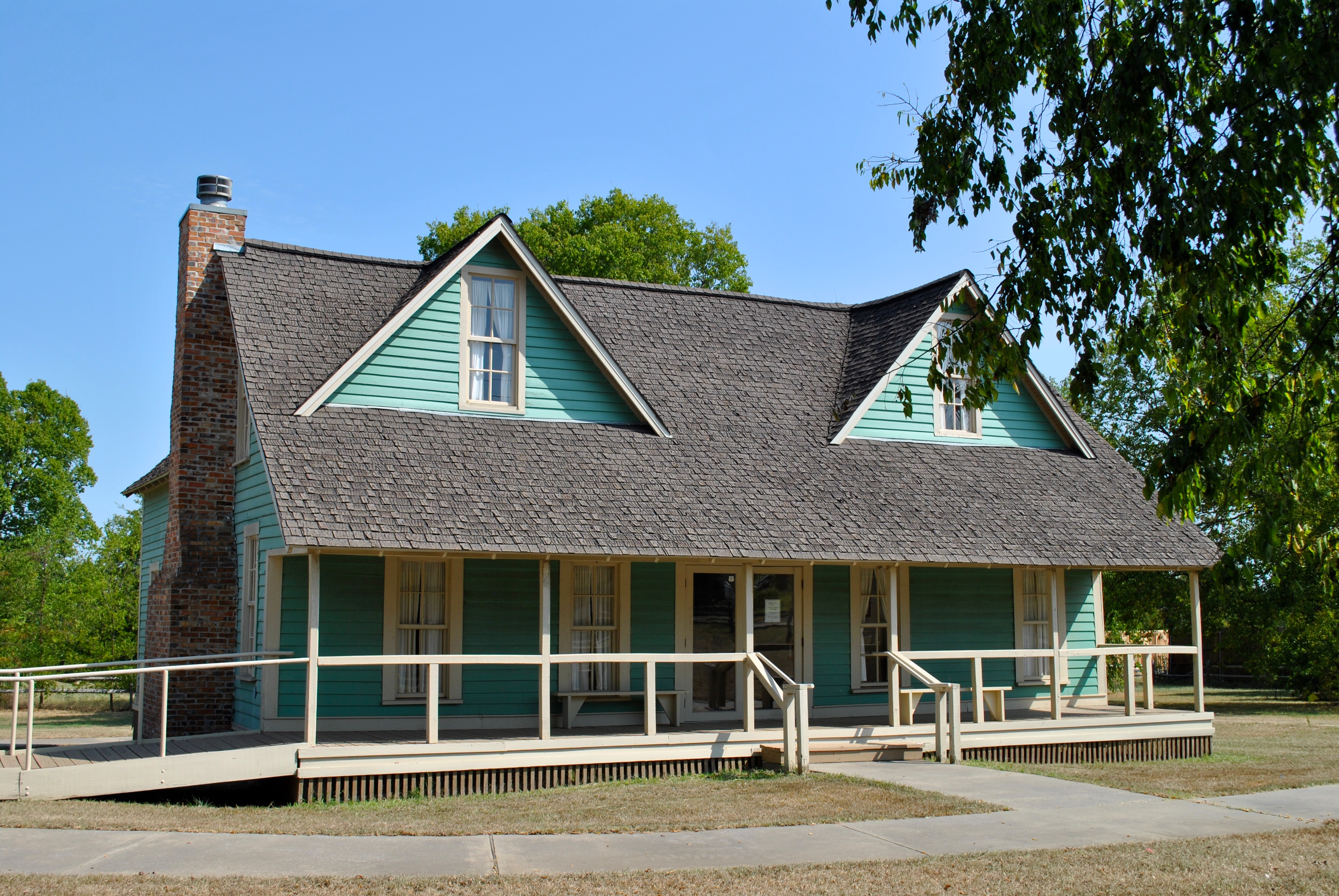
Historic Bankhead Highway visitor center in Mount Vernon, Texas

In June 2009 the Bankhead Highway was designated a Texas Historic Highway as part of the state's Historic Roads and Highways Program. The purpose of this designation is to supplement the Texas Historical Commission's existing "heritage tourism" programs and to increase interest in the Bankhead Highway.

Main Route

The primary route through Texas was originally Texas Highway No.1, which became part of U.S. Route 67 and former U.S. Route 80. The main route was followed by Interstate 10 and then Interstate 20 from El Paso to Fort Worth. It also passed through smaller cities as US 80 such as Odessa and Midland. From Fort Worth, the route left former US 80 and went through Garland and Texarkana before crossing into Arkansas.

Branch Route (also includes New Mexico)

The branch route entered Texas on US 62, then turned onto US 70 at Paducah. The route went through eastern New Mexico, first at Alamogordo on US 54, then through Roswell and then Clovis before entering Texas at El Paso. The branch route rejoined the main one at El Paso.

Third Route

A third route connected the main and branch routes in western Texas and eastern New Mexico. This route followed the current US 380 from Roswell, New Mexico to Post and then followed US 84.

=== Oklahoma ===
Branch Route

In Oklahoma, the branch route followed US 62 at Lawton from Texas. Then it followed US 70 to US 81 to Oklahoma State Highway 7 in rural parts of the state.

=== Arkansas ===
The route passed through Little Rock on US 70. At Hot Springs, travelers were given two options (alternate routes were common on auto trails).

Main Route

The main route followed US 67 from Texarkana and went through Arkadelphia and then followed Arkansas Highway 7.

Branch Route

The branch route followed US 70 from Oklahoma to Hot Springs.

=== Tennessee ===
Bankhead's route entered Tennessee followed US-70 from Arkansas to Memphis. In Memphis, the route followed US 78.

=== Mississippi ===
North Branch

North branch went from the south branch on Interstate 22/US 78 in Tupelo and then to Mooreville, Fulton and then Tremont before crossing into Alabama.

South Branch

South branch went from Tupelo on MS 6, then to Plantersville, Nettleton, Bigbee, and then Amory. It then followed US 278 south of Hatley and then Splunge before crossing into Alabama.

North branch to Tupelo

The route went from Olive Branch along US 78, then I-22 through Byhalia, Victoria, Red Banks, Holly Springs, Winborn, Hickory Flat, Myrtle, New Albany, Blue Springs, and then Sherman.

South branch from Tupelo

The route followed MS 305 from Olive Branch, Lewisburg, and Independence. Then it went on MS 310 around Sardis Lake and then MS 7 down to Oxford and then followed US 278 to Tupelo.

=== Alabama ===
The highway took the route of US-78 eastward from Mississippi and through Birmingham, and into Georgia.

=== Georgia ===
The Bankhead Highway followed present-day US 29, which traverses the northern half of Georgia on mostly its original alignment until it reaches Athens, where major highway construction in the 1960s re-routed the route of US 29 around the Athens loop highway. Along this stretch there are numerous "Old US 29" segments that pull off the main roadway. The Bankhead Highway then pulled off the current route of US 29 at Danielsville Road, and followed it until it became North Avenue, and followed North Avenue onto West Dougherty Street. It followed West Dougherty Street, turning South onto Pulaski St, and then turning West onto Broad Street, which eventually turns into Atlanta Highway. While US 29 now follows the route of State Route 316 (University Parkway) for much of the distance between Athens and Lawrenceville, the Bankhead route followed Atlanta Highway to the present US 29 Business (Winder Highway out of Lawrenceville and Atlanta Highway out of Athens) and went through the smaller towns of Bogart and Winder until joining back up with current US 29 outside of Lawrenceville, where it followed the current alignment of US 29 through Lawrenceville and on to Decatur. The Bankhead Highway (older US 29 alignment) veered onto Church Street (Georgia SR 8) and following it until it intersected Ponce De Leon Avenue. The route then headed west and followed Ponce De Leon Avenue into Atlanta to the intersection with Peachtree Street, where the route turned South one block to North Avenue, then followed North Avenue to Marietta Street. Following Marietta Street, it veered off to the west where a bridge (now closed but still standing) carried the highway over Georgia Southern Railroad tracks to the present Donald Lee Hollowell Parkway. From the intersection of Northside Drive and Donald Lee Hollowell Parkway west, the route roughly followed US 78 to Villa Rica, Georgia, then followed Highway 61 to Carrollton, Georgia, then followed 166 to Alabama state line.

Many Georgia cities along the original route have streets named Bankhead which mark the actual route. One notable exception to this rule is the Donald Lee Hollowell Parkway in the Bankhead neighborhood of Atlanta. This section was renamed in an effort to revitalize, or mask the social stigma attached to this high-crime section of the city. The same was done in the adjacent section west of the Chattahoochee River by the Cobb county commission, which named it Veterans Memorial Parkway through Mableton and Austell.

=== South Carolina ===
US 29 passed through the city of Greenville on Wade Hampton Boulevard and Church Street.

=== North Carolina ===
The route entered North Carolina on US 29 through Charlotte. It then went through Greensboro on US 70 before going into Durham on US 15.

=== Virginia ===
In Virginia, the route followed US 15 through Clarksville and then onto US 58 heading into South Hill. The route then went through Richmond and then Fredericksburg on US 1 before entering Washington D.C.

=== District of Columbia ===
The route followed US 1 from Virginia and terminated here.

== Signage ==
The Bankhead Highway was marked by a pole marker that was white with yellow stripes on the top and bottom and the letters "BH" in black.

== See also ==
- 1920 Motor Transport Corps convoy
