= Mississippi Highway 371 =

State highway in Mississippi

Mississippi Highway 371

Route information
- Maintained by MDOT
- Length: 44.347 mi (71.370 km)
- Existed: 1950–present

Major junctions
- South end: MS 6 in Bigbee
- I-22 / US 78 near Mooreville; Natchez Trace Parkway in Kirkville
- North end: MS 4 near New Site

Location
- Country: United States
- State: Mississippi
- Counties: Monroe, Itawamba, Lee, Prentiss

Highway system
- Mississippi State Highway System; Interstate; US; State
← MS 370	→ MS 373

Mississippi Highway 371 (MS 371) is a 44-mile-long (71 km) state highway in northeastern Mississippi running from MS 6 near Amory to MS 4 near New Site. The highway has been in existence since 1950 but it has followed its current alignment since 1965.

== Route description ==
MS 371 begins in the community of Bigbee, about three miles (4.8 km) northwest of the city of Amory at MS 6. The two-lane highway heads north through mostly wooded area of northern Monroe County. At the community of Cason, MS 371 intersects MS 776, the unsigned former alignment of MS 6. The highway heads into Itawamba County, where it continues north through more wooded areas. At the community of Evergreen, MS 371 curves to the northwest, crosses into Lee County and turns back to the north in the community of Richmond. Through this area, agricultural fields begin to surround the road. MS 371 reaches the community of Mooreville at a four-way stop controlled intersection with MS 178.

North of this intersection, MS 371 makes a sweeping s-curve to reach an interchange with Interstate 22 (I-22) and U.S. Route 78 (US 78). The interchange, exit 94 along I-22, is a simple diamond interchange. Through the interchange, MS 371 is briefly a four-lane divided highway. The state highway continues towards the east, back into Itawamba County, towards the town of Mantachie, one of two incorporated towns through which MS 371 travels. MS 371 heads southwest-northeast through the town on Main Street passing through the main commercial district of the town. Towards the east side of town, MS 371 intersects MS 363. Continuing north, the highway passes in front of Mantachie High School. As it exits the town, MS 371 crosses Twentymile Creek and heads through the census designated place of Kirkville. North of Kirkville, MS 371 has a pair of quadrant interchanges with the Natchez Trace Parkway, each separated by about one-half mile (0.80 km), though either direction of the parkway is accessible from both interchanges. Between the two interchanges, MS 371 also intersects MS 370 at its eastern terminus.

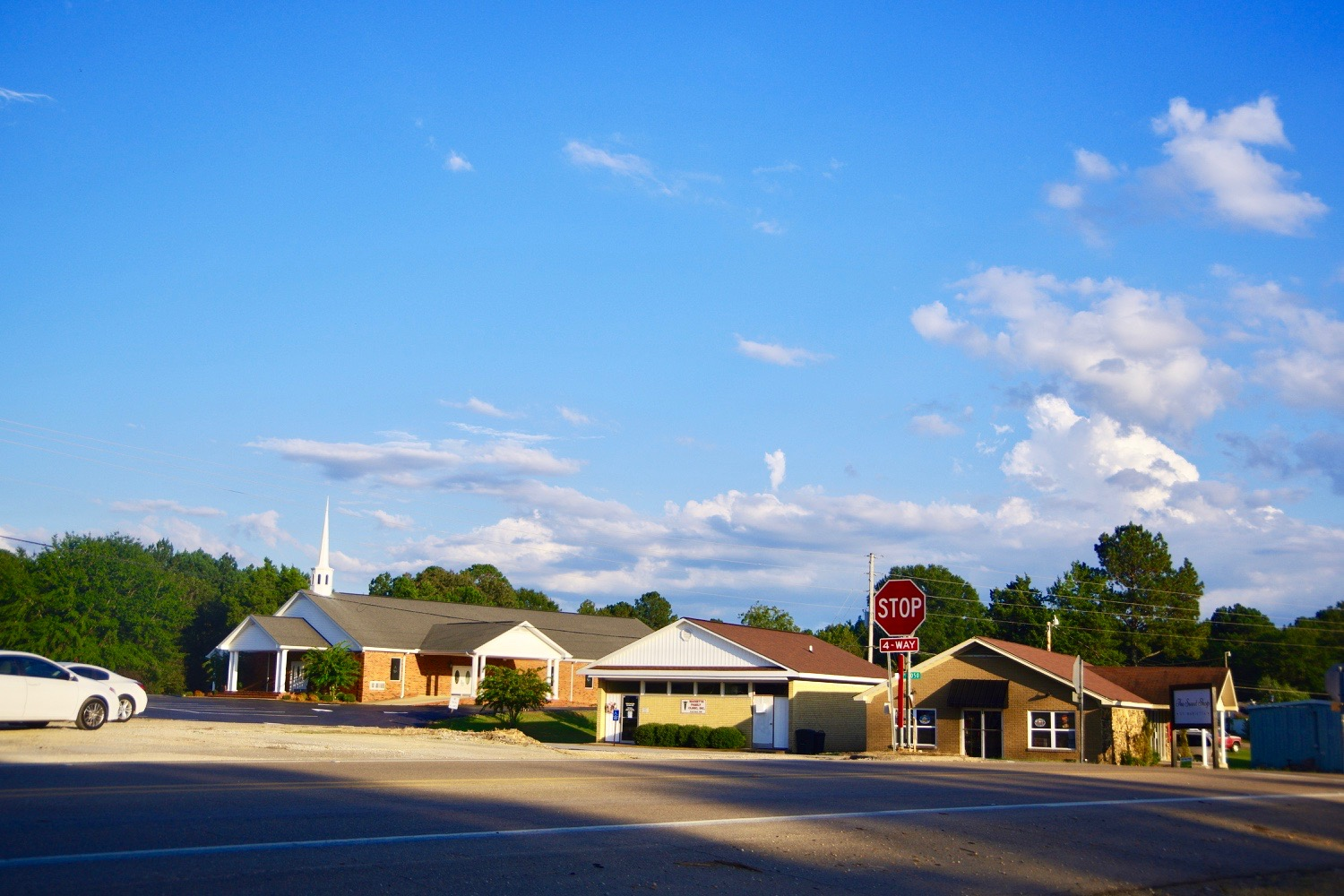
Intersection of MS 371 and MS 366 in Marietta

Continuing north, MS 371 enters Prentiss County. It soon enters the town of Marietta. Through Marietta, the highway only passes a few homes and businesses. Near the center of town, it reaches the eastern terminus of MS 366 and western terminus of County Road 4050 (CR 4050) at a four-way stop. MS 371 heads north, passing the town hall before traveling through unincorporated areas again. At the settlement known as Hobo Station, MS 371 ends at an intersection with MS 4 adjacent to a gas station and general store.

== History ==
MS 371 first appeared on the Mississippi state map in the 1950 edition connecting Cason at MS 6 and Mooreville at US 78. However, a state-maintained road connecting the two communities had existed since 1940. A second segment of MS 371 was designated in 1956, running from Mantachie to US 45 in the Saltillo vicinity, generally following the route of MS 363. Also around this time, MS 363 followed the current routing of MS 371 from Mantachie to MS 4. By 1958, the two segments of the route were connected along an unpaved road from Mooreville to Mantachie. In 1960, a slight extension of the route was made at its southern end. MS 6 was relocated away from Cason, and MS 371 took over the 3.7-mile-long (6.0 km) north-south former segment of MS 6 between Bigbee and Cason. A swap of highways 363 and 371 north of Mantachie occurred between 1964 and 1965. MS 371 has remained on this alignment since then.

== Major intersections ==
County	Location	mi	km	Destinations	Notes
Monroe	Bigbee	0.000	0.000	MS 6 – Amory, Nettleton	Southern terminus
Monroe	Cason	3.652	5.877	MS 776 west (Old Highway 6)	Eastern terminus of MS 776
Itawamba	No major junctions				
Lee	Mooreville	18.971	30.531	MS 178	
Lee		19.658– 19.917	31.636– 32.053	I-22 / US 78 – Birmingham, Tupelo	Exit 94 (I-22)
Itawamba	Mantachie	26.058	41.936	MS 363 – Mantachie, Fulton	
Itawamba	Kirkville	36.415	58.604	Natchez Trace Parkway – Tupelo, Nashville	Quadrant interchange
Itawamba	Kirkville	36.605	58.910	MS 370 west – Baldwyn	Eastern terminus of MS 370
Itawamba	Kirkville	36.911	59.402	Natchez Trace Parkway – Tupelo, Nashville	Quadrant interchange
Prentiss	Marietta	40.122	64.570	MS 366 west / CR 4050 – Baldwyn, Marietta Springs Park	Eastern terminus of MS 366
Prentiss	Hobo Station	44.347	71.370	MS 4	Northern terminus
1.000 mi = 1.609 km; 1.000 km = 0.621 mi
