= U.S. Route 78 in Mississippi =

Segment of U.S. Highway in northern Mississippi

U.S. Highway 78

Route information
- Maintained by MDOT
- Length: 117.4 mi (188.9 km)
- Existed: November 11, 1926–present

Major junctions
- West end: US 78 / SR 4 at the Tennessee state line in Mineral Wells
- I-22 / I-269 / MS 304 in Byhalia; MS 4 / MS 7 in Holly Springs; MS 178 at various locations; MS 15 / MS 30 in New Albany; US 45 in Tupelo; MS 23 in Tremont
- East end: I-22 / US 78 / SR 4 at the Alabama state line near Tremont

Location
- Country: United States
- State: Mississippi
- Counties: DeSoto, Marshall, Benton, Union, Pontotoc, Lee, Itawamba

Highway system
- United States Numbered Highway System; List; Special; Divided; Mississippi State Highway System; Interstate; US; State
← MS 76	→ US 80
← MS 172	MS 178	→ MS 182

U.S. Highway 78 (US 78) is a 117.4 miles (188.9 km) east-west controlled-access highway in northern Mississippi. The section from its intersection with Interstate 269 (I-269) in Byhalia to the Alabama state line runs concurrently with I-22. The highway runs across the northeastern rural part of the state, connecting several population centers.

Mississippi's portion of US 78 is defined in Mississippi Code Annotated § 65-3-3.

== Route description ==
US 78 enters Olive Branch in DeSoto County, Mississippi from Capleville in Shelby County, Tennessee. In DeSoto County; it then has an interchanges with Craft Road, MS 302, MS 305, Bethel Road, and Red Banks Road before meeting the western terminus of I-22 at the DeSoto-Marshall line at Byhalia. I-22/US 78 bypasses the city to the southwest; exits 26 (Landfill Road) and 30 (MS 4/MS 7) provide access to the city. Continuing southeastward, the freeway than passes through the Holly Springs National Forest and into Benton County passing near several small towns that are accessible through interchanges with or connecting to MS 178. Upon exiting the forest into Union County, I-22/US 78 approaches the county seat of New Albany before passing just southwest of it with four exits (60, 61, 63, and 64) providing direct access to the city. MS 30 shares a brief concurrency with I-22/US 78 between exits 61 and 64 with the latter exit being at MS 15. To the southeast of the city near the town of Sherman in Pontotoc County, I-22/US 78 has a second brief concurrency with MS 9 starting between the exits 73 and 76. Exit 73 is a six-ramp partial cloverleaf interchange, the first non-diamond interchange on the freeway since I-22's starting point at I-269, a distance of about 61.2 miles (98.5 km). I-22/US 78 then enters Lee County and passes north of Tupelo, its county seat, with five exits (81, 82, 85, 86, and 87) connecting to the city, including an interchange with MS 178 (exit 81) northwest of Tupelo along with interchanges with the Natchez Trace Parkway (exit 85) and US 45/Corridor V (exit 86) north of the city with Corridor V becoming concurrent with I-22/US 78. The freeway then turns eastward and has an interchange with MS 371 north of Mooreville before crossing into Itawamba County. I-22/US 78/Corridor V then has an interchange with MS 178 (to MS 363) in Peppertown before crossing the Tennessee–Tombigbee Waterway to its next interchange with South Adams Street (exit 104), which provides access to the community of Fulton, the county seat. MS 25 becomes concurrent with I-22/US 78/Corridor V and heads eastward along the route at the exit as well. A weigh station is also just beyond the exit. One exit later (108), MS 25 and Corridor V branch off and head northward. I-22/US 78 then turns east-southeastward with one final interchange (exit 113) with MS 23 south of Tremont before crossing into Alabama.

== History ==
Bankhead Highway
- Location: Olive Branch–Alabama state line

In 1916, the Bankhead Highway was established along modern-day MS 178 from Olive Branch in DeSoto County to Itawamba County.

Across the country, the numerous named auto trails began creating problems for motorists. Many auto trails had confusing alternate routes and were not always the most direct routes; also, multiple different auto trails often overlapped on the same roadway. During the annual meeting of the American Association of State Highway Officials (AASHO) in San Francisco, California, in 1924, Minnesota state maintenance engineer A.H. Hinkle lobbied the organization to reorganize the nation's transcontinental highway system, suggesting a nationwide numbering system of well-located and direct interstate highways be implemented. AASHO agreed to Hinkle's ideas, passing a resolution on November 20, 1924, to develop a better organized interstate highway system. AASHO then sent a recommendation to the U.S. Secretary of Agriculture, Howard M. Gore, to create a joint board between the Bureau of Public Roads and state highway officials from across the nation to develop a new organized system of numbered interstate highways. Gore acted on the recommendation in 1925, establishing the Joint Board on Interstate Highways.

The road that would become US 78 was established in 1926 along Bankhead Highway from Olive Branch to the Alabama state line.

== Exit list ==
County	Location	mi	km	Exit	Destinations	Notes
DeSoto	Olive Branch	0.0	0.0		US 78 west (SR 4 west) – Memphis	Continuation into Tennessee
DeSoto	Olive Branch	1.5	2.4	1	Craft Road	
DeSoto	Olive Branch	2.7	4.3	2	MS 302 (Goodham Road) – Olive Branch, Southaven	
DeSoto	Olive Branch	3.5	5.6	–	Weigh Station	
DeSoto	Olive Branch	4.4	7.1	4	MS 305 (Cockrum Road) – Olive Branch, Independence	
DeSoto	Olive Branch	5.3	8.5	–	Parking area	Closed to traffic
DeSoto	Olive Branch	6.6	10.6	6	Bethel Road / Hacks Cross Road	
DeSoto		10.2	16.4	10	Red Banks Road – Ingrams Mill, West Byhalia	
DeSoto–Marshall county line	Byhalia	11.4	18.3	12	I-269 / MS 304 – Tunica, Collierville I-22 east	Western terminus of I-22; western end of I-22 concurrency; exit 16 on I-269; signed as exits 12A (I-269 south, MS 304 west), 12B (I-269 north, MS 304 east)
Marshall	Byhalia	13.8	22.2	14	MS 309 – Byhalia	
Marshall		18.0	29.0	18	Victoria Road – Victoria, East Byhalia	
Marshall		21.2	34.1	21	Red Banks Road – Red Banks	
Marshall	Holly Springs	25.8	41.5	26	Landfill Road – West Holly Springs, Ashland	Former MS 4/MS 7
Marshall	Holly Springs	29.9	48.1	30	MS 4 / MS 7 – Holly Springs, Oxford	Access to Senatobia via MS 7
Marshall		36.9	59.4	37	CCC Road – Lake Center	
Marshall	Potts Camp	41.0	66.0	41	To MS 349 – Potts Camp	
Benton	Hickory Flat	47.8	76.9	48	MS 178 – Hickory Flat	Access to MS 2 and MS 5
Union	Myrtle	54.3	87.4	55	Willow Drive – Myrtle	
Union	New Albany	60.0	96.6	60	Musford Drive – Glenfield	Connector to MS 30 and to a Walmart distribution center
Union	New Albany	61.0	98.2	61	MS 30 west – West New Albany, Mississippi, Oxford	Western end of MS 30 concurrency
Union	New Albany	62.4	100.4	63	Bratton Road / Carter Avenue / Central Avenue – Downtown New Albany	
Union	New Albany	63.4	102.0	64	MS 15 / MS 30 east – Pontotoc, Ripley	Eastern end of MS 30 concurrency
Union	New Albany	72.6	116.8	73	MS 9 north – Blue Springs	Western end of MS 9 concurrency; signed as exits 73A and 73B
Pontotoc	Sherman	76.2	122.6	76	MS 9 south (MS 178) – Sherman, Pontotoc	Eastern end of MS 9 concurrency
Lee	Tupelo	80.4	129.4	81	MS 178 (McCullough Boulevard) – West Tupelo	
Lee	Tupelo	81.7	131.5	82	Coley Road / Barnes Crossing Road	
Lee	Tupelo	84.3	135.7	85	Natchez Trace Parkway	
Lee	Tupelo	85.7	137.9	86	US 45 (Corridor V west) – Tupelo, Corinth	Western end of Corridor V concurrency; signed as exits 86A (south) and 86B (north)
Lee	Tupelo	87.2	140.3	87	Veterans Boulevard	Access to Elvis Presley birthplace
Lee		89.5	144.0	90	Auburn Road	
Lee		93.6	150.6	94	MS 371 – Mantachie, Mooreville	
Itawamba		96.7	155.6	97	Fawn Grove Road – Dorsey	
Itawamba		100.2	161.3	101	MS 178 / MS 363 – Peppertown, Mantachie	
Itawamba	Fulton	104.3	167.9	104	MS 25 south – Fulton, Amory	Western end of MS 25 concurrency, MS 178 resumes eastbound in downtown Fulton
Itawamba		108.0	173.8	108	MS 25 north (Corridor V east) – Belmont, Iuka; Corridor X ends	Eastern end of MS 25/Corridor V concurrency; western end of Corridor X concurrency; access to MS 76
Itawamba	Tremont	101.4	163.2	113	MS 23 – Tremont, Smithville	MS 178 terminates eastbound at intersection with MS 23 just north of Corridor X
Itawamba		117.4	188.9		I-22 east / US 78 east (SR 4 east) – Birmingham	Continuation into Alabama
1.000 mi = 1.609 km; 1.000 km = 0.621 mi: Closed/former; Concurrency terminus

== Mississippi Highway 178 ==
Mississippi Highway 178
- Old 78
- Location: Olive Branch–Tremont
- Length: 119.1 mi (191.7 km) (126.160 mi according to MDOT mileage)
- Existed: 1993–present

Mississippi Highway 178 (MS 178), or simply "Old 78", is a 119.1-mile-long (191.7 km) east-west state highway across the northern portion of the state of Mississippi. It is the former alignment of US 78, used from the 1940s until the 1990s. With the exception of a break at the Tennessee-Tombigbee Waterway in Fulton, MS 178 is a complete route from Memphis, Tennessee, to the Alabama state line.

== See also ==
U.S. Route 78
Previous state: Tennessee	Mississippi	Next state: Alabama
