= Mississippi Highway 145 =

Highway in Mississippi

Mississippi Highway 145

Route information
- Maintained by MDOT
- Length: 115.681 mi (186.171 km)
- Existed: 1993–present

Location
- Country: United States
- State: Mississippi

Highway system
- Mississippi State Highway System; Interstate; US; State
← I-110	→ MS 149

Mississippi Highway 145 (MS 145) is the designation for the parts of the old U.S. Route 45 (US 45) roadbed that the state continues to maintain or has designated. Those ten sections travel through Waynesboro, near Boice, through Shubuta, from De Soto to Meridian, through Shuqualak, through Macon, through Aberdeen, through Nettleton, from Shannon to Booneville, and through Corinth.

== Waynesboro ==
Mississippi Drive
- Location: Waynesboro
- Length: 7.721 mi (12.426 km)
- Existed: 2004–present

US 45 was fully rerouted out of Waynesboro in 2004, and the old alignment became MS 145.

MS 145 begins south of town at an intersection with US 45. It heads north through rural and wooded areas before entering the city limits as Mississippi Drive and passing through neighborhoods. The highway then passes through downtown, where it has an intersection with MS 184, before passing through business district and some more neighborhoods. MS 145 passes through more rural areas to have an interchange with US 84 to leave Waynesboro and continue north through wooded areas to come to an end at another intersection with US 45. The entire route of MS 145 is a two-lane highway.

The entire route is in Wayne County.

Location	mi	km	Destinations	Notes
	0.000	0.000	US 45 – Quitman, Shubuta, State Line	Southern terminus
Waynesboro	4.341	6.986	MS 184 (Azalea Drive)	
	6.176– 6.410	9.939– 10.316	US 84 – Laurel, Silas, AL	Diamond interchange
	7.721	12.426	US 45 – Quitman, Shubuta, State Line	Northern terminus
1.000 mi = 1.609 km; 1.000 km = 0.621 mi

== Boice ==
Mississippi Highway 145
- Location: Boice
- Length: 1.276 mi (2.054 km)

The section of MS 145 near the unincorporated community of Boice, Wayne County is a 1.3-mile-long (2.1 km) two-lane road. The highway is not signed with standard highway markers, the only references to the highway number are on small street signs at its two ends at US 45. The highway is not maintained by the Mississippi Department of Transportation (MDOT) past the limits of the intersections with US 45.

The entire route is in Boice, Wayne County.

mi	km	Destinations	Notes
0.000	0.000	US 45 / Pleasant Grove Chapparal Road – Pleasant Grove	Southern terminus
1.276	2.054	US 45 / Sally Gray Road	Northern terminus
1.000 mi = 1.609 km; 1.000 km = 0.621 mi

== Shubuta ==
High Street
- Location: Shubuta
- Length: 4.500 mi (7.242 km)
- Existed: 2001–present

By 2001, US 45 bypassed Shubuta, and MS 145 was created for US 45's old routing.

MS 145 begins south of town at an intersection with US 45. It heads north through rural wooded areas to have an intersection with MS 510 before curving to the northwest to cross a bridge over the Chickasawhay River. The highway then crosses a bridge over some railroad tracks before entering Shubuta and passing straight through downtown along High Street. MS 145 continues northwest to leave Shubuta and pass through farmland before coming to an end at another intersection with US 45. The entire route of MS 145 is a two-lane highway.

County	Location	mi	km	Destinations	Notes
Wayne		0.000	0.000	US 45 – Quitman, Waynesboro	Southern terminus
Wayne		1.517	2.441	MS 510 east – Matherville	Western terminus of MS 510
Clarke		4.500	7.242	US 45 – Quitman, Waynesboro	Northern terminus
1.000 mi = 1.609 km; 1.000 km = 0.621 mi

== De Soto–Meridian ==
Mississippi Highway 145
- Location: De Soto–Meridian
- Length: 29.909 mi (48.134 km)
- Existed: 1994–present

Beginning in 1994, US 45 was upgraded to a divided highway outside Meridian. The old alignment continued to be in the state highway system. All of US 45's former routing in Lauderdale County became part of MS 145 in 1998. Two years later, US 45 was realigned onto a new divided highway in Clarke County, and old sections of US 45 became signed as MS 145.

MS 145 begins in Clarke County at an intersection with US 45 just south of De Soto. It heads north to pass through the community as a two-lane highway before having an interchange with US 45. The highway leaves De Soto and passes through rural areas for several miles to become concurrent with MS 18 and cross the Chickasawhay River to enter Quitman. MS 145/MS 18 pass through a business district along Archusa Avenue before entering and having an intersection with MS 512, where MS 18 splits off and heads east. MS 145 continues north through neighborhoods, where it has an intersection with MS 513, before winding its way through rural areas for the next several miles, where it crosses US 45 several times, passes by Clarkco State Park, crosses in Lauderdale County, and passes through the community of Wolf Springs. The highway then enters the Meridian city limits and passes through neighborhoods along Roebuck Drive, where it widens to four-lane undivided highway shortly before coming to an end at an interchange with I-20/I-59 (US 11/US 80/MS 19; Exit 53), with the road continuing northwest into downtown as 22nd Avenue.

County	Location	mi	km	Destinations	Notes
Clarke	De Soto	0.000	0.000	US 45 – Waynesboro, Shubuta, Meridian	Southern terminus
Clarke	De Soto	1.516– 1.840	2.440– 2.961	US 45 – Meridian, Waynesboro	Partial cloverleaf interchange
Clarke		3.573	5.750	MS 18 west – Pachuta	Southern end of MS 18 concurrency
Clarke	Quitman	5.845	9.407	MS 18 east / MS 512 west (Donald Street)	Northern end of MS 18 concurrency; eastern terminus of MS 512
Clarke	Quitman	6.979	11.232	MS 513 north (Stonewall Road) – Stonewall	Southern terminus of MS 513
Clarke		11.788	18.971	US 45 – Waynesboro, Meridian	
Clarke		16.215	26.096	MS 514 west – Enterprise	Eastern terminus of MS 514
Clarke		19.327	31.104	US 45 – Waynesboro, Meridian	
Lauderdale	Wolf Springs	25.855– 26.140	41.610– 42.068	US 45 – Waynesboro, Meridian	Diamond interchange
Lauderdale	Meridian	29.561– 29.826	47.574– 48.000	I-20 / I-59 / US 11 / US 80 / MS 19 – Laurel, Jackson, Tuscaloosa	I-20/59 exit 153
Lauderdale	Meridian	29.909	48.134	22nd Avenue / Frontage Road – Downtown Meridian	Northern terminus
1.000 mi = 1.609 km; 1.000 km = 0.621 mi: Concurrency terminus

== Shuqualak ==
Mississippi Highway 145
- Location: Shuqualak
- Length: 4.277 mi (6.883 km)

MS 145 runs for 4.2 miles (6.8 km) in Shuqualak in Noxubee County, Mississippi.

MS 145 begins just south of town at an intersection with US 45. It heads north through rural areas for a short distance to enter Shuqualak at an intersection with MS 21/MS 39. It bypasses downtown along its east side, passing through neighborhoods before leaving Shuqualak and continuing north through rural areas for a few miles before coming to an end at another intersection with US 45. The entire route of MS 145 is a two-lane highway.

The entire route is in Noxubee County.

Location	mi	km	Destinations	Notes
	0.000	0.000	US 45 – Macon, Scooba	Southern terminus
Shuqualak	0.557	0.896	MS 21 south / MS 39 (Line Street) – Downtown, Philadelphia, De Kalb	Northern terminus of MS 21
	4.277	6.883	US 45 – Macon, Scooba	Northern terminus
1.000 mi = 1.609 km; 1.000 km = 0.621 mi

== Macon ==
Jefferson Street
- Location: Macon
- Length: 7.409 mi (11.924 km)
- Existed: 1998–present

By 1998, MS 145 was created after US 45 bypassed the town of Macon.

MS 145 begins just south of town at an intersection with US 45. It heads north through wooded areas, running parallel to the Noxubee River, for a few miles to become concurrent with MS 14 and cross a bridge over the river to enter Macon. The highway immediately passes through downtown along Jefferson Street, where MS 14 splits off onto Adams Street, before continuing north through neighborhoods for several miles. MS 145 the leaves Macon and continues through rural areas before coming to an end at another intersection with US 45. The entire route of MS 145 is a two-lane highway.

The entire route is in Noxubee County.

Location	mi	km	Destinations	Notes
	0.000	0.000	US 45 – Shuqualak, Brooksville	Southern terminus
	2.235	3.597	MS 14 west – Louisville	Southern end of MS 14 concurrency
Macon	2.812	4.525	MS 14 east (Adams Street) – Aliceville, AL	Northern end of MS 14 concurrency
	7.409	11.924	US 45 – Brooksville, Shuqualak	Northern terminus
1.000 mi = 1.609 km; 1.000 km = 0.621 mi: Concurrency terminus

== Aberdeen ==
Commerce Street
- Location: Aberdeen
- Length: 5.228 mi (8.414 km)
- Existed: 2000–present

MS 145 was created in 2000 after US 45 was rerouted to a new divided highway outside Aberdeen.

MS 145 begins on the east side of town at an intersection with US 45/MS 8/MS 25 along the banks of the Tombigbee River. It heads west to immediately pass through downtown along Commerce Street before passing through neighborhoods and curving to the north. The highway then passes through a business district before coming to an end at another intersection with US 45. Excluding a short section between James Street and Matubba Street, the entire route of MS 145 is a two-lane highway.

The entire route is in Aberdeen, Monroe County.

mi	km	Destinations	Notes
0.000	0.000	US 45 / MS 8 / MS 25 – Columbus, Amory, West Point, Houston	Southern terminus
3.439	5.535	To MS 8 west	Eastern terminus of unsigned segment of MS 8
5.228	8.414	US 45 – Columbus, Nettleton	Northern terminus
1.000 mi = 1.609 km; 1.000 km = 0.621 mi

== Nettleton ==
Will Robbins Highway
- Location: Nettleton
- Length: 2.550 mi (4.104 km)
- Existed: 1998–present

After US 45 was upgraded to a divided highway outside of Nettleton, MS 145 was designated along the former routing.

MS 145 begins on the south side of town in Monroe County at an intersection with US 45/US 278. It heads north through neighborhoods before turning northwest to pass through a business district and enter downtown, where it comes to an intersection with W Main Street (unsigned MS 774), a connector to MS 6, where it crosses into Lee County. The highway then passes through more neighborhoods before coming to an end at another intersection with US 45/US 278. The entire route of MS 145 is a two-lane highway.

The entire route is in Nettleton.

County	mi	km	Destinations	Notes
Monroe	0.000	0.000	US 45 / US 278 – Tupelo, Amory, Aberdeen	Southern terminus
Monroe–Lee county line	1.560	2.511	W Main Street (MS 774 east) to MS 6	Western terminus of MS 774
Lee	2.550	4.104	US 45 / US 278 – Tupelo, Amory, Aberdeen	Northern terminus
1.000 mi = 1.609 km; 1.000 km = 0.621 mi

== Shannon–Booneville ==
Mississippi Highway 145
- Location: Shannon–Booneville
- Length: 45.201 mi (72.744 km)
- Existed: 1977–present

US 45 was rerouted onto a freeway in Tupelo in 1977, no longer going through downtown Tupelo. The freeway was extended north and south in 1982 and 1984, and more of US 45 was moved. By 1986, the freeway extended as far as Shannon. About ten years later, US 45 was moved to a divided highway for Lee and most of Prentiss County, and the old alignment became MS 145.

MS 145 begins in Lee County in the eastern part of Shannon at an interchange between US 45, US 45 Alternate, and US 278. It heads northwest as a two-lane highway to bypass downtown along Noah Curtis Street before turning north along Romie Hill Avenue at an intersection with MS 245. The highway leaves Shannon and crosses over a creek to enter Verona along Raymond Avenue. MS 145 widens to a four-lane undivided highway as it passes through industrial areas before passing through downtown. It passes through neighborhoods before crossing into Tupelo at an intersection with US 278/MS 6 (Pontotoc Parkway). The highway heads north through a business district (along Gloster Street), where it has an intersection with South Green Street (unsigned MS 769), before crossing over a creek and reaching an intersection with Main Street that includes a railroad crossing diagonally across it. Continuing north through a business district, it has an interchange with McCullough Boulevard, MS 178, and MS 145 continues north to have another intersection with Green Street (MS 769) before leaving Tupelo, crossing a creek and passing under I-22/US 78. MS 145 narrows to two-lanes and has an interchange with the Natchez Trace Parkway before entering Saltillo and passing a business district before having an interchange with US 45. It bypasses downtown to the northwest, having intersections with MS 363 (Mobile Street) and MS 766 (N 3rd Street) as it passes through neighborhoods, before leaving Saltillo and passing through rural areas. It passes through Guntown, where it has an intersection with MS 348, before passing through Baldwyn, where it has a concurrency with MS 370 and crosses into Prentiss County.

MS 145 continues northeast through rural areas for several miles, where it passes just west of Wheeler and have an intersection with MS 362, to have an interchange with MS 30 and enter Booneville. It becomes 2nd Street as it widens to four-lane undivided highway and passes through neighborhoods and straight through downtown. The highway then passes through a business district, where it has an intersection with MS 4, before crossing a creek and narrowing to two-lanes to leave Booneville and pass through rural areas before coming to an end at another intersection with US 45.

County	Location	mi	km	Destinations	Notes
Lee	Shannon	0.000– 0.301	0.000– 0.484	US 45 / US 45 Alt. south / US 278 – Tupelo, Okolona, Nettleton, Columbus	Interchange; southern terminus; northern terminus of US 45 Alternate
Lee	Shannon	1.375	2.213	MS 245 south (Romie Hill Avenue) – Okolona	Northern terminus of MS 245
Lee	Tupelo	7.181	11.557	US 278 / MS 6 (Pontotoc Parkway) – Oxford, Pontotoc, Nettleton	
Lee	Tupelo	8.208	13.209	MS 769 north (S Green St)	Southern terminus of unsigned MS 769
Lee	Tupelo	11.439– 11.749	18.409– 18.908	MS 178 (McCullough Boulevard) to I-22 / US 45 / US 78 – Sherman	Interchange
Lee	Tupelo	12.345	19.867	MS 769 south (N Green St)	Northern terminus of unsigned MS 769
Lee		15.626– 16.081	25.148– 25.880	Natchez Trace Parkway	Interchange
Lee	Saltillo	18.690– 19.015	30.079– 30.602	US 45 – Corinth, Tupelo	Interchange
Lee	Saltillo	19.253	30.985	MS 363 south (Mobile Street) – Downtown, Mantachie	Northern terminus of MS 363
Lee	Saltillo	19.962	32.126	MS 766 south (N 3rd Street) – Downtown	Northern terminus of MS 766
Lee	Guntown	24.016	38.650	MS 348 (North Main Street) – New Albany, Downtown	
Lee	Baldwyn	28.457	45.797	MS 370 west (Bethany Road)	Southern end of MS 370 concurrency
Prentiss	Baldwyn	28.757	46.280	MS 370 east (Clayton Street) – Marietta	Northern end of MS 370 concurrency
Prentiss		33.136	53.327	MS 30 west to US 45 – New Albany, Tupelo	Eastern terminus of unsigned segment of MS 30
Prentiss		33.314	53.614	MS 362 east – Wheeler	Western terminus of MS 362
Prentiss	Booneville	37.309– 37.591	60.043– 60.497	MS 30 – Tishomingo, New Albany	Interchange
Prentiss	Booneville	42.029	67.639	MS 4 (Chambers Drive) – Ripley, Bay Springs Lake	
Prentiss		45.201	72.744	US 45 – Corinth, Tupelo	Northern terminus
1.000 mi = 1.609 km; 1.000 km = 0.621 mi: Concurrency terminus

== Corinth ==
Mississippi Highway 145
- Location: Corinth
- Length: 7.610 mi (12.247 km)
- Existed: 1998–present

MS 145 was designated as the old routing of US 45 through Corinth in 1998.

MS 145 begins just south of town at an intersection with US 45. It heads northeast to enter the city limits along Tate Street to pass through some industrial areas to have an intersection with US 72 before passing through a business district and crossing a railroad track to enter downtown. The highway then turns north along Fillmore Street, at an intersection with MS 785, and crosses another railroad track to continue north through downtown and pass through neighborhoods. MS 145 then makes a left turn onto Main Street for a short distance before turning right onto Polk Street. It continues north through neighborhoods for several miles before passing through rural areas, where it has an intersection with MS 2. The highway continues north through rural areas before coming to the Tennessee state line, where the road continues north into Guys, TN as Old US Highway 45 S. The entire route of MS 145 is a two-lane highway. The portion of the road north of its southern terminus and north of downtown Corinth is not maintained by the state.

The entire route is in Alcorn County.

Location	mi	km	Destinations	Notes
	0.000	0.000	US 45 – Tupelo, Jackson, TN	Southern terminus
Corinth	2.501	4.025	US 72 (Lee Highway) – Memphis, TN, Iuka	
Corinth	6.640	10.686	MS 2 – Kossuth, Michie, TN	
Corinth	7.610	12.247	Old US Highway 45 S To US 45 – Guys	Tennessee state line; northern terminus
1.000 mi = 1.609 km; 1.000 km = 0.621 mi
