= Mississippi Highway 363 =

State highway in Mississippi

Mississippi Highway 363

Route information
- Maintained by MDOT
- Length: 20.901 mi (33.637 km)

Major junctions
- South end: MS 178 in Peppertown
- North end: MS 145 in Saltillo

Location
- Country: United States
- State: Mississippi
- Counties: Itawamba, Lee

Highway system
- Mississippi State Highway System; Interstate; US; State
← MS 362	→ MS 364

Mississippi Highway 363 (MS 363) is a state highway in Itawamba and Lee counties in northeastern Mississippi. It travels for a length of 20.9 miles (33.6 km).

== Route description ==
MS 363 begins in the community of Peppertown, about three miles (4.8 km) west of Itawama County's county seat of Fulton. The highway's southern terminus is at MS 178, however some signage for MS 363 appears west along MS 178 to its interchange with Interstate 22/U.S. Route 78 (I-22/US 78). MS 363 heads north and northwest towards Mantachie. In the center of town, it intersects MS 371. Continuing its course northwest and north, the highway passes a few businesses near the town center but its surroundings becomes more rural with some open fields and houses lining the road. At Centerville, MS 363 exits the town limits of Mantachie, briefly curves towards the west, then resumes a northwest heading. At the community of Ratliff, the highway curves to the west again and enters Lee County. In Lee County, the surroundings turn to more woods. It has an interchange with the Natchez Trace Parkway (a pair of quadrant interchanges) and then enters Saltillo. In the western part of the city, MS 363 is known as Mobile Street and passes through a residential neighborhood. Upon crossing a railroad, it heads west through the central business district of Saltillo. At 3rd Avenue, MS 366 meets MS 766 at its southern terminus. Past there, the highway heads through another residential neighborhood before curving to the north, curving back to the west, and ending at MS 145.

== History ==
The portion of highway from Peppertown to Mantachie had been part of the state highway since at least 1928. Around 1950, the designation of MS 363 was assigned on this highway from US 78 at Peppertown to Mantachie and then further north along modern-day MS 371 to MS 4 at Hobo Station, Prentiss County. A state highway, initially designated MS 371, connecting Mantachie with Saltillo was created in 1956. Around 1965, MS 363 and MS 371 swapped alignments north of Mantachie with MS 363 heading west to Saltillo at US 45 and MS 371 heading north to MS 4. MS 363 has not had any major changes since then.

== Major intersections ==
County	Location	mi	km	Destinations	Notes
Itawamba	Peppertown	0.000	0.000	MS 178 to I-22 / US 78	Southern terminus
Itawamba	Mantachie	5.547	8.927	MS 371 – Mooreville, Kirkville	
Lee		18.328– 18.592	29.496– 29.921	Natchez Trace Parkway	Interchange
Lee	Saltillo	19.866	31.971	MS 766 west (3rd Avenue) – Lake Lamar Bruce	Eastern terminus of MS 766
Lee	Saltillo	20.901	33.637	MS 145 / Mobile Street	Northern terminus
1.000 mi = 1.609 km; 1.000 km = 0.621 mi
