= Mississippi Highway 370 =

Highway in Mississippi

Mississippi Highway 370

Route information
- Maintained by MDOT, Union County, City of Baldwyn
- Length: 52.008 mi (83.699 km)

Western segment
- Length: 15.245 mi (24.534 km)
- West end: MS 5 in Ashland
- East end: MS 15 in Falkner

Central segment
- Length: 14.122 mi (22.727 km)
- West end: MS 4 in Ripley
- East end: MS 30 in Pleasant Ridge

Eastern segment
- Length: 22.641 mi (36.437 km)
- West end: MS 9 near Jericho
- Major intersections: US 45 in Baldwyn; MS 145 in Baldwyn; MS 366 near Baldwyn
- East end: MS 371 in Kirkville

Location
- Country: United States
- State: Mississippi
- Counties: Benton, Tippah, Union, Prentiss, Lee, Itawamba

Highway system
- Mississippi State Highway System; Interstate; US; State
← MS 369	→ MS 371

Mississippi Highway 370 (MS 370) is a state highway in northeastern Mississippi. It is split into three distinct sections, with the first running from Ashland at MS 5 to MS 15 at Falkner, the second running from MS 4 in Ripley to MS 30 in Pleasant Ridge, and the third and final section running from MS 9 and MS 30 near Jericho to Kirkville at MS 371.

== Route description ==
=== Western segment ===
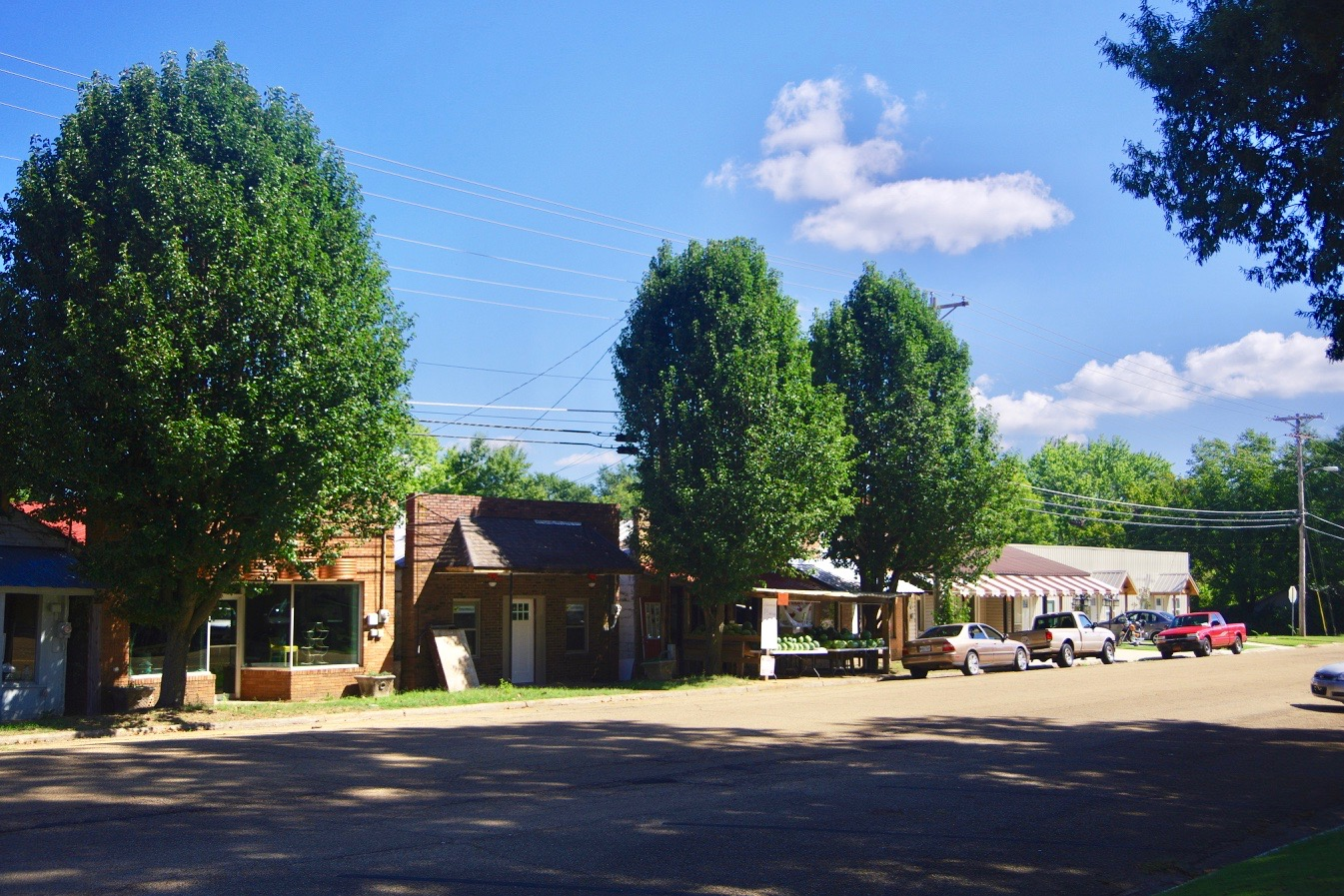
MS 370 in Ashland

MS 370 begins in Benton County in Ashland at a large intersection with MS 5. It heads straight through downtown along Ripley Avenue before leaving Ashland and winding its way east through wooded hilly terrain for several miles to cross into Tippah County. The highway now enters farmland for a few miles before entering Falkner, where it comes to an end at an intersection with MS 15 just south of downtown.

=== Central segment ===
MS 370 begins again in Tippah County in the eastern outskirts of Ripley at an intersection with MS 4. It travels southeast through rural hilly areas to pass through Dumas before entering Union County and ending up at Pleasant Ridge, where it comes to an end Aton intersection with MS 30.

=== Eastern segment ===
MS 370 begins again in Union County just south of Graham at an intersection with MS 30 and MS 9. While the middle and eastern sections of the highway are not connected, there is signage along MS 30 pointing to MS 4 south stating "To MS 370" but signage along the MS 4 concurrency itself indicating that it's part of mainline MS 370. MS 4 and MS 370 head south along Naaman Branyan Memorial Highway through a wooded/brush-lined area. MS 4 breaks off the concurrency leaving MS 370 to continue south as an unsigned highway, though signage along the road indicates that it is maintained by the county as Union County Route 170 (CR 170). The road winds its way through wooded terrain to pass through Jericho.

In Jericho, MS 370 briefly travels southwest along CR 171 before the road turns due east onto a state-maintained road where signage for MS 370 resumes. It briefly crosses into Prentiss County before crossing into Lee County to pass through Bethany. The highway now straddles the county line with Prentiss County for three miles (4.8 km) to enter Baldwyn. Inside the city limits, a diamond interchange with U.S. Route 45 (US 45) is present. MS 370 now enters downtown, curves slightly to the south to fully reenter Lee County, and has a short concurrency with MS 145 (4th Street). Along the concurrency, the two roads travel northeast into Prentiss County.

The highway now leaves Baldwyn along East Clayton Street. At first, the highway is city-maintained and travels southeast, then heads east along the Prentiss-Lee county line again. At East Street, state maintenance resumes. Continuing east, it has an intersection with MS 366, where MS 370 turns southeast and later crosses into Itawamba County. MS 370 now enters Kirkville, where it comes to an end at an intersection with MS 371, near that highway's intersection with the Natchez Trace Parkway.

None of Mississippi Highway 370 is included in the National Highway System.

== Major intersections ==
County	Location	mi	km	Destinations	Notes
Benton	Ashland	0.000	0.000	MS 5 (Boundary Drive)	Western terminus of western segment
Tippah	Cross Roads	11.394	18.337	MS 369 north / CR 327 north / CR 400 south – Little Hope	Southern terminus of unsigned MS 369
Tippah	Falkner	15.245	24.534	MS 15 – Walnut, Ripley	Eastern terminus of western segment
Gap in route
Tippah	Ripley	15.245	24.534	MS 4 (East Walnut Street) / Hazel Road – Ripley, Booneville	Western terminus of central segment
Union	Pleasant Ridge	29.367	47.262	MS 30 – New Albany, Booneville	Eastern terminus of central segment
Gap in route
Union		29.367	47.262	MS 30 / MS 9 begins – New Albany, Booneville	Western terminus of eastern segment; western end of MS 4 concurrency
Union		30.652	49.330	MS 9 south – Ellistown, Alpine, Blue Springs	Eastern end of MS 4 concurrency
Prentiss	No major junctions				
Lee	Baldwyn	39.408– 39.673	63.421– 63.848	US 45 – Tupelo, Booneville, Corinth	Diamond interchange
Lee	Baldwyn	40.962	65.922	MS 145 south (South 4th Street) – Guntown	Western end of MS 145 concurrency
Prentiss	Baldwyn	41.262	66.405	MS 145 north (North 4th Street) / Clayton Street	Eastern end of MS 145 concurrency
Lee–Prentiss county line		43.559	70.101	MS 366 east – Marietta	Western terminus of Prentiss County section of MS 366
Itawamba	Kirkville	52.008	83.699	MS 371 – Marietta, Kirkville, Mantachie	Eastern terminus of eastern segment
1.000 mi = 1.609 km; 1.000 km = 0.621 mi: Concurrency terminus
