= Mississippi Highway 178 =

Highway in Mississippi

Mississippi Highway 178
- Old 78
- MS 178 is highlighted in red

Route information
- Auxiliary route of US 78
- Maintained by MDOT
- Length: 119.1 mi (191.7 km) (126.160 mi according to state mileage)
- Existed: 1993–present

Western segment
- Length: 105.2 mi (169.3 km)
- West end: Old Highway 78 at the Tennessee state line
- Major intersections: MS 4 / MS 7 in Holly Springs; I-22 / US 78 in Hickory Flat; MS 5 / MS 705 in Hickory Flat; MS 15 / MS 30 in New Albany; MS 9 in Blue Springs; I-22 / US 78 in Tupelo; US 45 / MS 6 in Tupelo; I-22 / US 78 in West Fulton
- East end: Dirt road at the Tennessee Tombigbee Waterway

Eastern segment
- Length: 13.9 mi (22.4 km)
- West end: Access Road in Fulton (at the Tennessee Tombigbee Waterway)
- Major intersections: MS 25 near Fulton; MS 23 in Tremont
- East end: Dead end at the Alabama state line near Tremont

Location
- Country: United States
- State: Mississippi
- Counties: Desoto, Marshall, Benton, Union, Pontotoc, Lee, Itawamba

Highway system
- Mississippi State Highway System; Interstate; US; State
| ← MS 172 | → MS 182 |

Mississippi Highway 178 (MS 178), or simply "Old 78", is a 119.1-mile-long (191.7 km) east-west state highway across the northern portion of the state of Mississippi. It is the former alignment of U.S. Route 78 (US 78), used from the 1940s until the 1990s. With the exception of a break at the Tennessee-Tombigbee Waterway in Fulton, MS 178 is a complete route from Memphis, Tennessee, to the Alabama state line.

== Route description ==
MS 178 begins at the Tennessee state line in DeSoto County, with the road continuing northwest into the city of Memphis as Old Highway 78. It heads southeast as a two-lane highway to pass through the community of Mineral Wells before entering the city of Olive Branch and passing under the interchange between MS 302 and MS 305, with it connecting to both via side roads. The highway passes directly through downtown before passing through suburban areas and then leaving the city shortly thereafter. MS 178 crosses a bridge over the Coldwater River as it passes through woodlands before entering Marshall County.

MS 178 immediately enters the city limits of Byhalia and it crosses under I-269/MS 304 (without an interchange) before passing through neighborhoods to travel directly through downtown, where it has an intersection with MS 309. It leaves downtown and has an intersection with MS 703 before leaving Byhalia and traveling southeast through a mix of farmland and wooded areas for the next several miles, passing through the communities of Victoria and Red Banks, before entering the town of Holly Springs at an interchange with Landfill Road, the new Holly Springs bypass. The highway passes through some neighborhoods before becoming concurrent (overlapped) with MS 7, and they head south along Memphis Street to pass by Rust College before entering downtown and coming to an intersection with MS 4, with MS 7 following MS 4 west while MS 178 follows MS 4 east. The two highways leave downtown and pass through neighborhoods along E Van Dorn Avenue, where MS 4 splits off Randolph Street, and MS 178 curves more southward to pass through an industrial area before leaving Holly Springs. MS 178 curves back southeastward to travel through a portion of the Holly Springs National Forest for a few miles before passing through the community of Lake Center, crossing over I-22/US 78 (without an interchange), and crossing a bridge over the Tippah River into the town of Potts Camp. The highway passes directly through the center of town along Church Avenue, having its first intersection with MS 701 (Mulberry Street), an intersection with MS 349, as well as it second and final intersection with MS 701 (Front Avenue), before leaving both Potts Camp and Marshall County as it enters Benton County.

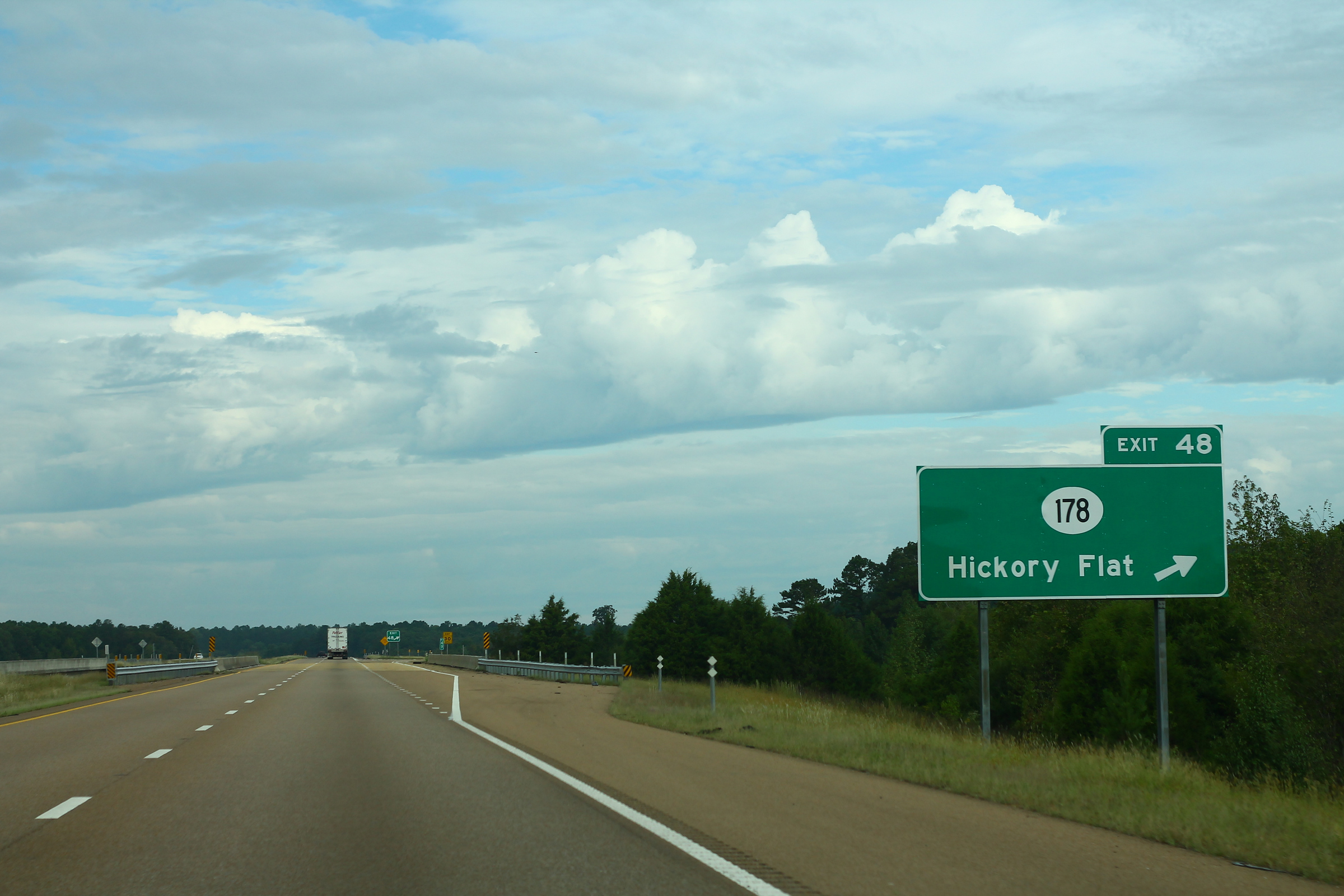
I-22/US 78 westbound sign for MS 178 in Hickory Flat (Exit 48)

MS 178 travels eastward down a narrow valley, where it passes through the community of Winborn, before widening to a four-lane divided highway for a short distance to have an interchange with I-22/US 78 (Exit 48) before passing through the town of Hickory Flat as a two-lane, where it has an intersection with MS 5. The highway now winds its way southward to cross some wooded hills into Union County.

MS 178 curves back to the southeast as it travels through the town of Myrtle (where it has an intersection with MS 761 (Springdale Avenue), and later farmland for a few miles to enter the city of New Albany. The highway passes neighborhoods, and then a large and long business district, before crossing the Tallahatchie River into downtown. It travels through downtown for several blocks before passing through neighborhoods, where it has an intersection with MS 15/MS 30. The entire length of MS 178 in New Albany is known as Bankhead Street. MS 178 leaves New Albany and travels through a mix of farmland and wooded areas for the next several miles, passing through the village of Blue Springs ( where it has an intersection with MS 9), before entering the town of Sherman and crossing in Pontotoc County.

MS 178 travels along the northeastern corner of town, having an intersection with MS 778 (Lamar Street/3rd Avenue), before leaving Sherman and Pontotoc County for Lee County. It passes through farmland for a few miles before entering the city of Tupelo at an interchange with I-22/US 78 (Exit 81). The highway becomes McCullough Boulevard as it widens to a four-lane undivided highway and passes suburbs for a couple miles, where it has an interchange with the Natchez Trace Parkway, before widening to a divided Expressway. MS 178 has an interchange with Country Club Road before leaving the expressway and following MS 145 south (Gloster Street) into downtown at an interchange. MS 178 splits off along Main Street as a four-lane undivided highway to have an intersection with MS 769 (Green Street) and passing through the historic central business district (briefly becoming a two-lane) to have an interchange with US 45, where it becomes concurrent with MS 6. The highway passes by the Elvis Presley Birthplace before MS 6 splits off along Briar Ridge Road, with MS 178 narrowing to two-lanes to leave Tupelo and pass through the community of Mooreville, where it has an intersection with MS 371, before crossing into Itawamba County.

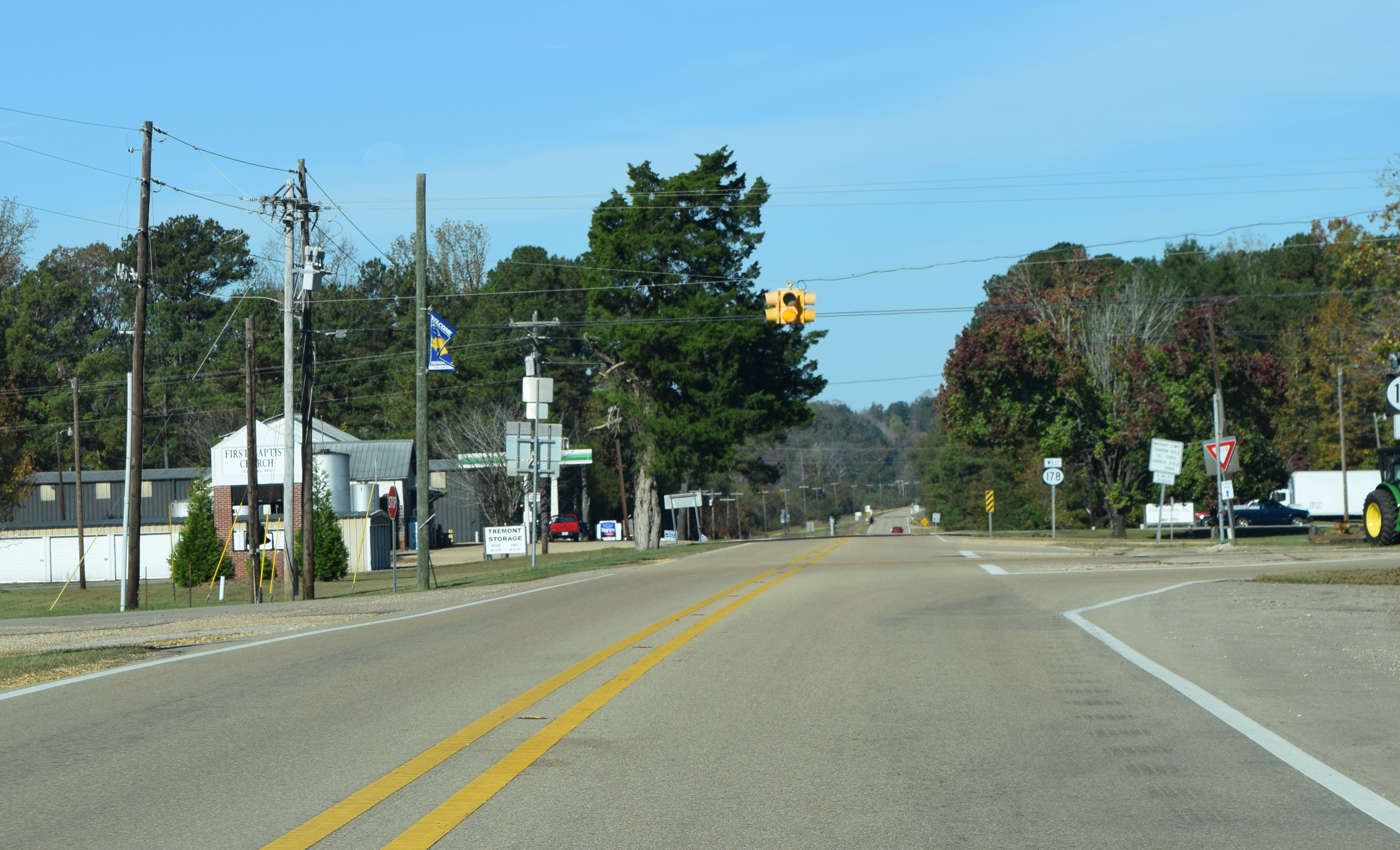
Mississippi Highway 178 in Tremont

MS 178 passes through the community of West Fulton, where it has an interchange with I-22/US 78 (Exit 101), as well as an intersection with MS 363, before coming to a dead end along the banks of the Tennessee Tombigbee Waterway.

MS 178 begins again along the other side of the waterway in the city of Fulton, immediately traveling through downtown along Main Street, before leaving the city to have an intersection with MS 25. The highway winds its way east through the hilly terrain of the North Central Hills for the next several miles, passing through the town of Tremont (where it has a short concurrency with MS 23, before coming to another dead end at the Alabama state line.

== History ==
MS 178 closely parallels both the current US 78 and the old Bankhead Highway, a macadam highway designated as part of US 78 in 1926, and used from then until the 1930s. In the 1940s, the Mississippi portion of US 78 was upgraded to a uniform two-lane highway, In some Mississippi towns, such as New Albany, the "new" US 78 routing followed the old Bankhead Highway, and thus became part of MS 178.

In some parts of North Mississippi, "Bankhead Road" or "Bankhead Street" identifies sections of the original (pre 1940s) US 78 highway.

In the 1980s US 78 began to be upgraded further, albeit in stages, into a four-lane, interstate-style route, bypassing parts of the original 1940s US 78 alignment. For instance, in 1990, the Mississippi portion of US 78 followed the 1940s two-lane from the Alabama state line to the Clay community, then joined four-lane US 78 to New Albany, reverted to the 1940s two-lane from New Albany to Holly Springs, then four-lane from Holly Springs to Memphis. By 2000, the entire length of US 78 in Mississippi was four-lane, and parts of old US 78 were reconditioned for use as MS 178.

In Mississippi, unlike Alabama or Tennessee, MS 178 and US 78 are totally separate routes.

=== The Elvis Connection ===
Although it is true the Presley family used US 78 to travel from Tupelo to Memphis, the current routing of US 78 was not the one used. In order to recreate the actual route used to make the move, MS 178 is the route used, as it was the main highway used in 1948.

== Major intersections ==
| County | Location | mi | km | Destinations | Notes |
|---|---|---|---|---|---|
| Mississippi–Tennessee line | | 0.0 | 0.0 | Yahweh Road | Western terminus; road continues into Memphis, Tennessee, as Old Highway 78 |
| DeSoto | Olive Branch | 2.9 | 4.7 | To MS 305 south / Westbranch Road | |
| Marshall | Byhalia | 13.2 | 21.2 | MS 703 east (Church Street) | Western terminus of MS 703 |
| Marshall | Byhalia | 13.7 | 22.0 | MS 309 | |
| Marshall | Byhalia | 14.8 | 23.8 | MS 703 west (Quinn Mill Road) | Eastern terminus of MS 703 |
| Marshall | Holly Springs | 26.1– 26.2 | 42.0– 42.2 | To US 78 / Landfill Road | Partial cloverleaf interchange; former MS 4/MS 7 |
| Marshall | Holly Springs | 28.9 | 46.5 | MS 7 north (N Memphis Street) | Western end of MS 7 concurrency |
| Marshall | Holly Springs | 29.6 | 47.6 | MS 4 west / MS 7 south (W Van Dorn Avenue) to US 78 | Eastern end of MS 7 concurrency; western end of MS 4 concurrency |
| Marshall | Holly Springs | 29.9 | 48.1 | MS 4 east (Randolph Street) | Eastern end of MS 4 concurrency |
| Marshall | Potts Camp | 42.3 | 68.1 | MS 701 east (Mulberry Street) | Western terminus of MS 701 |
| Marshall | Potts Camp | 42.4 | 68.2 | MS 349 south (Center Street) | Northern terminus of MS 349 |
| Marshall | Potts Camp | 42.7 | 68.7 | MS 701 west (Front Avenue) | Eastern terminus of MS 701 |
| Benton | Hickory Flat | 48.6– 48.8 | 78.2– 78.5 | I-22 / US 78 – Memphis, Tupelo | I-22 exit 48; Diamond interchange. |
| Benton | Hickory Flat | 49.4 | 79.5 | MS 705 east (Wolf Street) | Western terminus of MS 705 |
| Benton | Hickory Flat | 49.8 | 80.1 | MS 5 north / MS 705 west (Crum Street) | Southern terminus of MS 5; eastern terminus of MS 705 |
| Union | Myrtle | 56.1 | 90.3 | MS 761 north (Springdale Avenue) | Southern terminus of MS 761 |
| Union | New Albany | 64.9 | 104.4 | MS 15 / MS 30 to I-22 – Oxford, Pontotoc, Blue Mountain | |
| Union | Blue Springs | 74.1 | 119.3 | MS 9 | |
| Pontotoc | Sherman | 77.5 | 124.7 | MS 778 west | Eastern terminus of MS 778 |
| Lee | Tupelo | 81.9– 82.1 | 131.8– 132.1 | I-22 / US 78 – Memphis, Birmingham | I-22 exit 81; diamond interchange |
| Lee | Tupelo | 85.9– 86.2 | 138.2– 138.7 | Natchez Trace Parkway | Interchange |
| Lee | Tupelo | 86.5– 86.6 | 139.2– 139.4 | Country Club Road | Diamond interchange |
| Lee | Tupelo | 87.0– 87.2 | 140.0– 140.3 | MS 145 north (Gloster Street) To US 45 – Corinth, Columbus | Western end of MS 145 concurrency; partial cloverleaf interchange |
| Lee | Tupelo | 88.2 | 141.9 | MS 145 south (Gloster Street) | Eastern end of MS 145 concurrency |
| Lee | Tupelo | 88.7 | 142.7 | MS 769 (Green Street) | |
| Lee | Tupelo | 89.4– 89.5 | 143.9– 144.0 | US 45 / MS 6 west – Corinth, Pontotoc, Columbus | Western end of MS 6 concurrency; diamond interchange |
| Lee | Tupelo | 90.2 | 145.2 | MS 6 east (Briar Ridge Road) – Plantersville, Nettleton | Eastern end of MS 6 concurrency |
| Lee | Mooreville | 96.3 | 155.0 | MS 371 | |
| Itawamba | West Fulton | 102.9– 103.1 | 165.6– 165.9 | I-22 / US 78 – Fulton, Birmingham, Tupelo | I-22 exit 101; diamond interchange |
| Itawamba | West Fulton | 103.4 | 166.4 | MS 363 north – Mantachie | Southern terminus |
| Itawamba | West Fulton | 105.2 | 169.3 | Dirt road | Eastern terminus of western section |
| Itawamba | Tennessee Tombigbee Waterway | | | | |
| Itawamba | Fulton | 105.2 | 169.3 | Access Road | Western terminus of eastern section |
| Itawamba | | 110.9 | 178.5 | MS 25 – Amory, Belmont, Iuka | |
| Itawamba | Tremont | 115.3 | 185.6 | MS 23 north – Red Bay Ala. | Western end of MS 23 concurrency |
| Itawamba | Tremont | 115.7 | 186.2 | MS 23 south to US 78 – Smithville | Eastern end of MS 23 concurrency |
| Itawamba | | 119.1 | 191.7 | Harbor Road | Eastern terminus; Old Highway 78 closed beyond this point |
1.000 mi = 1.609 km; 1.000 km = 0.621 mi: Concurrency terminus
