= Mississippi Highway 366 (Prentiss County) =

Highway in Prentiss County, Mississippi

Mississippi Highway 366
- MS 366 highlighted in red

Route information
- Maintained by MDOT
- Length: 8.70 mi (14.00 km)
- Existed: 1957–present

Major junctions
- West end: MS 370 near Baldwyn
- East end: MS 371 in Marietta

Location
- Country: United States
- State: Mississippi
- Counties: Prentiss

Highway system
- Mississippi State Highway System; Interstate; US; State
← MS 365	→ MS 367

Mississippi Highway 366 (MS 366) is a highway in Prentiss County, Mississippi. It starts at MS 370 at the Lee–Prentiss county line in the west. The route intersects many county routes as it travels eastward to MS 371, its eastern terminus. The route was designated in 1957, and became fully paved by 1971.

== Route description ==
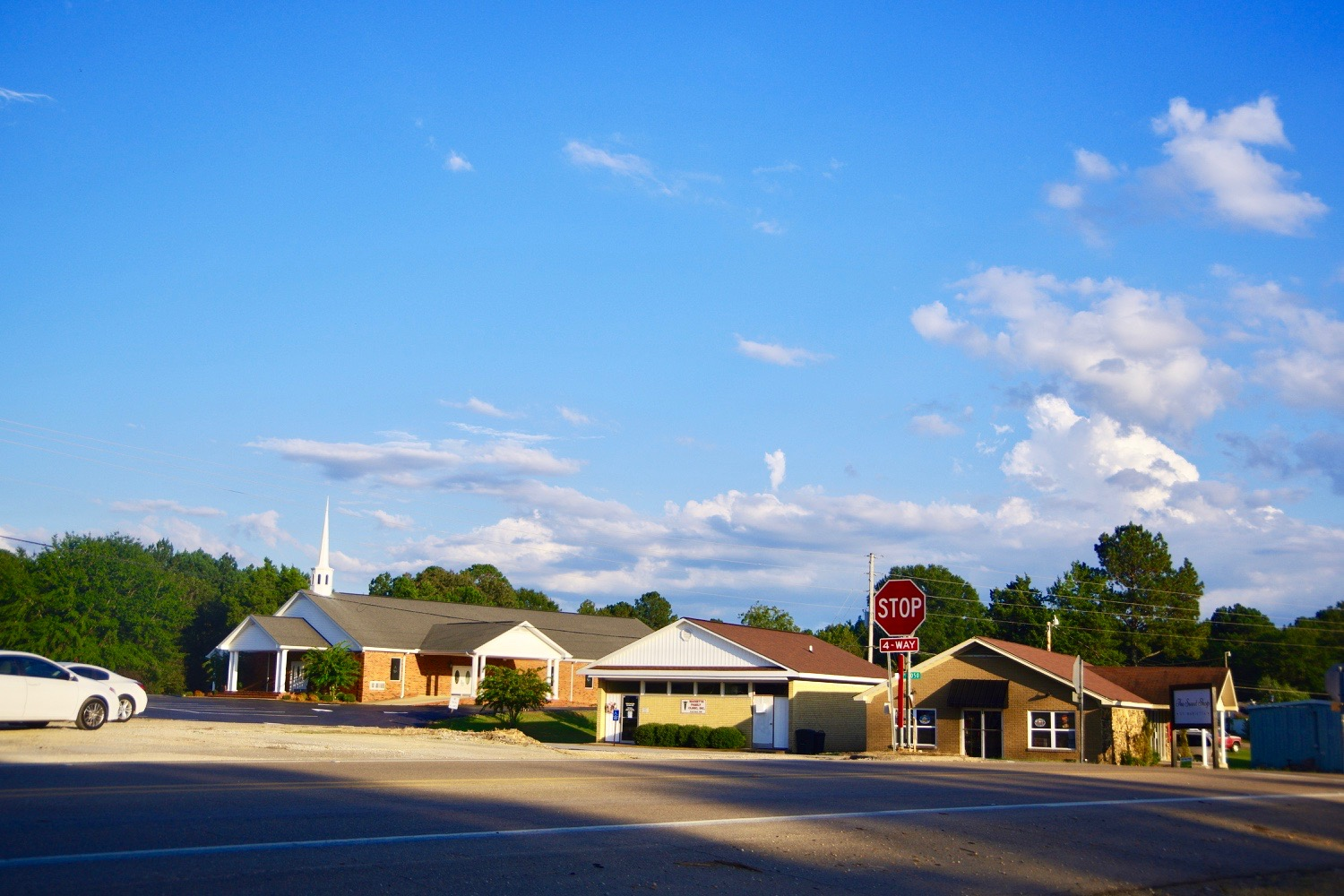
Intersection of MS 366 and MS 371 in Marietta

MS 366 starts at MS 370 on the Lee–Prentiss county line. The route curves northward after intersecting County Route 5011 (CO 5011). At CO 5411, the road begins a series of turns through the forest. MS 366 soon reaches CO 5334 and dips southeastward. It temporarily heads eastward at CO 5441, before turning south at CO 5345. The route travels east again at CO 5450, around a small area of farmland. MS 366 crosses over Casey Creek after intersecting CO 5481. The road shifts upward as it enters Marietta, and MS 366 ends at MS 371. The road continues on as CO 4050.

In 2013, Mississippi Department of Transportation (MDOT) calculated as many as 760 vehicles traveling west of CO 5311, and as few as 650 vehicles traveling east of CO 5381. It is legally defined in Mississippi Code § 65-3-3, and is maintained by MDOT as part of the state highway system.

== History ==
MS 366 was designated in 1957, as a gravel road from MS 370 to MS 363. By 1965, MS 363 and MS 371 were rerouted, causing MS 366's eastern terminus to change to MS 371. All of MS 366 was paved by 1971.

== Major intersections ==
County	Location	mi	km	Destinations	Notes
Prentiss–Lee county line		0.0	0.0	MS 370 – Baldwyn, Kirkville	Western terminus
Prentiss	Marietta	8.7	14.0	MS 371 – Booneville, Mantachie	Eastern terminus
1.000 mi = 1.609 km; 1.000 km = 0.621 mi
