= Barrett Ridge, Mississippi =

- Unincorporated community
- Location within Mississippi Location within the United States
- Coordinates: 34°25′07″N 88°42′10″W
- Country: United States
- State: Mississippi
- County: Lee
- Elevation: 367 ft (112 m)
- Time zone: UTC-6 (Central (CST))
  - Summer (DST): UTC-5 (CDT)
- GNIS feature ID: 677256

Barrett Ridge is an unincorporated community located in Lee County, Mississippi. It is just north of the town of Saltillo off U.S. Highway 45.

== History ==
Barrett Ridge was founded in 1858 by Edmond Barrett. He was an Irish Catholic immigrant who left Ireland in 1848, during the great famine. The community was centered around the St. Thomas Aquinas, which burned in 2009.

Edmond (Ned) and one of his sisters, Briget, joined other immigrants fleeing the Great Famine and went to America in search of a way to provide for their family. On the way over, Briget fell from the boat while sleepwalking and drowned. Ned worked hard when he got to America and sent money home to the family in Ireland. He worked his way south and then moved westward into Mississippi in 1852. Ned married Mary Vina Warren on December 29, 1858 and they settled into a log cabin on a gentle rolling hill near Saltillo. On March 10, 1866 Edmond (Ned) Barrett had made enough money to purchase that land, which became known as Barrett Ridge. Ned and Mary had 11 children, whom they raised in the log cabin on Barrett Ridge. Most of them established homes there and raised their own children on the Ridge.

The Ridge is located 10 miles north of Tupelo and 4 miles northwest of Saltillo in Lee County and now consists of descendants of Edmond Barrett: the Barrett, Larkin, Bishop, Poppelreiter, Greenwood, Gusmus, Long, and Brown families and more.

The descendants of Edmond's siblings still live in Boola, Bweeng, Mallow, County Cork, Ireland, where Ned lived before he left for America.
