= Dorsey, Mississippi =

- Unincorporated community
- Location within Mississippi Location within the United States
- Coordinates: 34°15′07″N 88°30′35″W
- Country: United States
- State: Mississippi
- County: Itawamba
- Elevation: 381 ft (116 m)
- Time zone: UTC-6 (Central (CST))
  - Summer (DST): UTC-5 (CDT)
- ZIP code: 38855
- Area code: 662
- GNIS feature ID: 669333

Dorsey is an unincorporated community located in Itawamba County, Mississippi. Dorsey is approximately 4 miles (6.4 km) west of Fulton and approximately 6 miles (9.7 km) east of Mooreville near Mississippi Highway 178. A post office operated under the name Dorsey from 1897 to 1971.
