= Hobo Station =

Hobo Station may refer to:

- Hobo Station, Mississippi, a community in the United States
- Hobo Station (Mie), a rail station in Japan
