= Mississippi Highway 4 =

Highway in Mississippi

Mississippi Highway 4

Route information
- Maintained by MDOT and Town of Tunica
- Length: 159.8 mi (257.2 km) (144.700 mi excluding concurrencies)
- Existed: 1935–present

Major junctions
- West end: Mississippi River levee in Fox Island
- US 61 in Tunica; US 51 in Senatobia; I-55 in Senatobia; I-22 / US 78 in Holly Springs; US 45 in Booneville
- East end: MS 25 in Dennis

Location
- Country: United States
- State: Mississippi
- Counties: Tunica, Tate, Marshall, Benton, Tippah, Prentiss, Tishomingo

Highway system
- Mississippi State Highway System; Interstate; US; State
| ← MS 3 | → MS 5 |

Mississippi Highway 4 (MS 4) runs east–west from an intersection in the community of Fox Island west of Tunica, Mississippi, near the border with Arkansas, to MS 25 in Tishomingo County, Mississippi. It travels a distance of 159.8 miles (257.2 km), serving Tunica, Tate, Marshall, Benton, Tippah, Prentiss, and Tishomingo counties.

== Route description ==
MS 4 begins in the Mississippi Delta region on a Levee of the Mississippi River, in Tunica County, at the community of Fox Island. It heads east as a narrow two-lane road (Bailey Road) through farmland for a couple miles to make a right turn onto Fox Island Road. The highway enters the Tunica city limits and immediately enters downtown, turning north along Main Street for a couple blocks before turning right onto River Road and heading east through neighborhoods. MS 4 now enters a business district and becoming concurrent with US 61. They head southward as a four-lane highway to leave Tunica and pass through rural areas for a few miles to the community of Evansville, where MS 4 splits off and heads east. MS 4 passes through White Oak as a two-lane to have an interchange and become concurrent with MS 3. The highway now crosses the Coldwater River into Tate County.

MS 3/MS 4 now pass through Savage before turning southward, with MS 4 breaking off and heading east shortly thereafter. MS 4 now climbs onto a plateau as it passes through Strayhorn before entering Senatobia. It enters some neighborhoods and turns left onto a two-lane northern bypass of the city, known as Wilson Drive. The highway heads through outskirts to a business district, where it has an intersection with US 51. MS 4 turns south through a mix of neighborhoods and businesses for a few blocks (along Norfleet Drive) before making a sharp left onto Main Street and immediately having an interchange with I-55 (Exit 265). The highway leaves Senatobia and passes through the communities of New Town and Looxahoma before having an intersection with MS 305. MS 4 passes through Thyatira and Wyatte before crossing into Marshall County.

MS 4 almost immediately has an intersection with MS 309 before passing through Chulahoma and turning northeast through wooded areas for several miles to an intersection with MS 7. They become concurrent and head north to enter Holly Springs and immediately have an interchange with I-22/US 78 (Exit 30). MS 4/MS 7 become S Craft Street as they widen to a four-lane for a short distance through a business district before narrowing back to two-lanes and passing through neighborhoods. The highway now enters downtown and makes a sharp right onto W Van Dorn Avenue to come to an intersection with MS 178, with MS 7 heading north along MS 178 (Memphis Street), while MS 4 heads east along MS 178 (E Van Dorn Avenue). They pass through neighborhoods for a couple blocks before MS 4 breaks off along N Randolph Street. MS 4 heads north for several blocks before turning right onto Salem Avenue. The highway now leaves Holly Springs and has an intersection with Eddie Lee Smith Drive (a new northern bypass of the city) before heading eastward through the Holly Springs National Forest and crossing into Benton County.

MS 4 now enters the foothills of the Appalachian Mountains as it leaves the National Forest and passes through the town of Snow Lake Shores (where it passes directly beside the Snow Lake Dam). The highway now enters the outskirts of Ashland, where it immediately becomes concurrent with MS 5 and they head southward through rural areas. MS 4 breaks off and winds its way east up the Tippah River valley to cross into Tippah County at Gravestown.

MS 4 heads east for a few miles to pass by Ripley Airport before entering Ripley and passing straight through downtown (entering town along Ashland Road, turning left onto Jackson Street, before turning right onto Spring Street to the roundabout at the Tippah County Courthouse square, where it comes out along Jefferson Street). The highway has an intersection (and extremely short concurrency) with MS 15 before leaving downtown and having an intersection with MS 370 in some outlying neighborhoods. MS 4 now leaves Ripley and has an intersection with MS 2 before winding its way through hilly areas for several miles, where it passes through Mitchell and crosses the Hatchie River, before crossing into Prentiss County.

MS 4 passes through Jumpertown before having an interchange with US 45 and heading along a northern and eastern bypass of the city of Booneville (where it has an intersection with MS 145, Tuscumbia Road, crosses the Tuscumbia River, and has an interchange with MS 30). The highway has an intersection with MS 371 as it passes through Hobo Station and New Site before winding its way through hilly terrain for several miles to enter Tishomingo County near its crossing of the Tennessee Tombigbee Waterway at Jamie Whitten Lock and Dam.

MS 4 passes northeast through hilly and wooded areas for several miles, where it has an interchange with the Natchez Trace Parkway, before entering the community of Dennis, where MS 4 comes to an end at an intersection with MS 25 at the center of town.

== Major intersections ==
| County | Location | mi | km | Destinations | Notes |
|---|---|---|---|---|---|
| Tunica | Fox Island | 0.0 | 0.0 | Mississippi River levee | Western terminus; end of state maintenance |
| Tunica | Tunica | 4.7 | 7.6 | US 61 north – Memphis | West end of US 61 overlap |
| Tunica | Evansville | 8.1 | 13.0 | US 61 south – Clarksdale | East end of US 61 overlap |
| Tunica | | 16.7– 17.1 | 26.9– 27.5 | MS 3 north – Memphis | West end of MS 3 overlap; interchange |
| Tate | | 19.6 | 31.5 | MS 3 south – Crenshaw, Marks | East end of MS 3 overlap |
| Tate | Senatobia | 33.7 | 54.2 | US 51 – Coldwater, Downtown Senatobia | |
| Tate | Senatobia | 35.1– 35.2 | 56.5– 56.6 | I-55 – Memphis, Grenada | I-55 exit 265 |
| Tate | | 43.3 | 69.7 | MS 305 north – Independence, Olive Branch | Southern terminus of MS 305 |
| Marshall | | 52.9 | 85.1 | MS 309 north – Byhalia | Southern terminus of MS 309 |
| Marshall | | 65.4 | 105.3 | MS 7 south – Oxford | West end of MS 7 overlap |
| Marshall | Holly Springs | 66.8– 67.0 | 107.5– 107.8 | I-22 / US 78 – Memphis, Tupelo | I-22/US 78 exit 30 |
| Marshall | Holly Springs | 68.4 | 110.1 | MS 7 north / MS 178 west (Memphis Street) | East end of MS 7 overlap; west end of MS 178 overlap |
| Marshall | Holly Springs | 68.6 | 110.4 | MS 178 east (Van Dorn Avenue) | East end of MS 178 overlap |
| Marshall | Holly Springs | 71.2 | 114.6 | Eddie Lee Smith Drive | Northern bypass of Holly Springs |
| Benton | Ashland | 85.4 | 137.4 | MS 5 north – Ashland | West end of MS 5 overlap |
| Benton | | 91.7 | 147.6 | MS 5 south – Hickory Flat | East end of MS 5 overlap |
| Tippah | Ripley | 107.1 | 172.4 | MS 15 north – Falkner | West end of MS 15 overlap |
| Tippah | Ripley | 107.2 | 172.5 | MS 15 south – New Albany | East end of MS 15 overlap |
| Tippah | Ripley | 108.3 | 174.3 | MS 370 east – Dumas | Western terminus of MS 370 |
| Tippah | | 109.6 | 176.4 | MS 2 east – Kossuth, Corinth | Western terminus of eastern segment of MS 2 |
| Prentiss | Booneville | 129.8– 130.0 | 208.9– 209.2 | US 45 – Corinth, Tupelo | Interchange |
| Prentiss | Booneville | 131.7 | 212.0 | MS 145 (North Second Street) – Booneville, Northeast Mississippi Community College | |
| Prentiss | Booneville | 133.2 | 214.4 | Tuscumbia Road - Tuscumbia | |
| Prentiss | Booneville | 135.0 | 217.3 | East Church Street - Tishomingo, Downtown Booneville, Crows Neck Education Center | Former MS 30 |
| Prentiss | | 137.0– 137.3 | 220.5– 221.0 | MS 30 – Tishomingo, New Albany | Interchange |
| Prentiss | Hobo Station | 142.9 | 230.0 | MS 371 south – Marietta | Northern terminus of MS 371 |
| Tishomingo | | 156.6 | 252.0 | Natchez Trace Parkway | Interchange |
| Tishomingo | Dennis | 159.8 | 257.2 | MS 25 – Tishomingo, Iuka, Belmont | Eastern terminus |
1.000 mi = 1.609 km; 1.000 km = 0.621 mi: Concurrency terminus
