= Pontocola, Mississippi =

- Ghost town
- Location within Mississippi Location within the United States
- Coordinates: 34°08′43″N 88°49′18″W
- Country: United States
- State: Mississippi
- County: Lee
- Elevation: 360 ft (110 m)
- Time zone: UTC-6 (Central (CST))
  - Summer (DST): UTC-5 (CDT)
- GNIS feature ID: 684561

Pontocola is a ghost town in Lee County, in the U.S. state of Mississippi.

== History ==
Pontocola is a name derived from the Chickasaw language purported to mean "hanging grapes". A post office operated under the name Pontocola from 1858 to 1904.
