= Bigbee =

Bigbee may refer to:

- Bigbee, Alabama, an unincorporated community in Washington County, Alabama
- Bigbee, Mississippi, an unincorporated community in Monroe County, Mississippi, United States
- Bigbee (crater), a crater on Mars
