= Brewer, Mississippi =

- Unincorporated community
- Location within Mississippi Location within the United States
- Coordinates: 34°08′52″N 88°41′01″W
- Country: United States
- State: Mississippi
- County: Lee
- Elevation: 279 ft (85 m)
- Time zone: UTC-6 (Central (CST))
  - Summer (DST): UTC-5 (CDT)
- GNIS feature ID: 667542

Brewer is an unincorporated community located in Lee County, Mississippi, United States.

Though the community had different names in its early years, it became known as "Brewer" in the 1910s. When it organized its own voting district, it took the name in honor of then-Mississippi Gov. Earl Leroy Brewer.

The community has two churches, Brewer Methodist and Brewer Baptist, as well as the Brewer Cemetery.

Jimmy Kennedy, author of River Run Cookbook, is from Brewer.
