= Eggville, Mississippi =

- Unincorporated community
- Location within Mississippi Location within the United States
- Coordinates: 34°19′51″N 88°34′06″W
- Country: United States
- State: Mississippi
- County: Lee
- Elevation: 463 ft (141 m)
- Time zone: UTC-6 (Central (CST))
  - Summer (DST): UTC-5 (CDT)
- Area code: 662
- GNIS feature ID: 669695

Eggville is an unincorporated community in Lee County, Mississippi.

== History ==
Eggville was named for the large amount of eggs produced in the area. A post office operated under the name Eggville from 1889 to 1904.

Eggville was once home to the Northeast Mississippi Sacred Harp Singing Convention.
