= Peggy Welch =

American nurse and politician from Indiana

Member of the Indiana House of Representatives from the 60th district
- In office 1998 – 2012
- Succeeded by: Peggy Mayfield

Personal details
- Born: October 13, 1955 (age 70) Fulton, Mississippi
- Party: Democratic
- Spouse: David
- Education: Mississippi College
- Occupation: Registered nurse, educator, politician

Peggy M. Welch is an American nurse and former politician from Indiana. Welch is a former member of Indiana House of Representatives.

== Early life ==
On October 13, 1955, Welch was born in Fulton, Mississippi. Welch's father was Roger McDaniel, a school principal. Welch is a native of Itawamba County, Mississippi who attended Terry Consolidated School in Terry, Mississippi. Welch graduate of Clinton High School in Clinton, Mississippi.

== Career ==
Welch began her career as a nurse, and later an educator.

In 1998, Welch became a Democratic member of the Indiana House of Representatives, representing the 60th District, until 2012. In 2012, as an incumbent, Welch lost the election. Welch was defeated by Peggy Mayfield.

== Personal life ==
Welch's husband is David. They have one child. Welch and her family live in Bloomington, Indiana.
