= Boguefala Creek =

Stream in Mississippi, U.S.

Coordinates: 34.0614974°N 88.4619885°W

Boguefala Creek is a stream in the U.S. state of Mississippi, flowing through the eastern part of Mooreville.

Boguefala Creek is a name derived from either the Choctaw language or Chickasaw language and it most likely means "long creek".
