= Thyatira, Mississippi =

Thyatira
- Unincorporated community
- Location within the state of Mississippi
- Coordinates: 34°38′02″N 89°45′20″W
- Country: United States
- State: Mississippi
- County: Tate
- Elevation: 364 ft (111 m)
- Time zone: UTC-6 (Central (CST))
  - Summer (DST): UTC-5 (CDT)
- ZIP code: 38668
- GNIS feature ID: 678741

Thyatira is an unincorporated community in eastern Tate County, Mississippi, United States. It is located approximately 11 miles east of the county seat of Senatobia and 21 miles west of Holly Springs in Marshall County. The main thoroughfare is Mississippi Highway 4. Thyatira is home to two of the oldest Churches of Christ on record in the state, both of which bear the same name: Thyatira Church of Christ.
