= Mineral Wells, Mississippi =

- Unincorporated community
- Location within Mississippi Location within the United States
- Coordinates: 34°59′26″N 89°51′56″W
- Country: United States
- State: Mississippi
- County: Desoto
- Elevation: 335 ft (102 m)
- Time zone: UTC-6 (Central (CST))
  - Summer (DST): UTC-5 (CDT)
- ZIP code: 38654
- Area code: 662
- GNIS feature ID: 690337

Mineral Wells is an unincorporated community located in central DeSoto County, Mississippi, United States, near the Mississippi/Tennessee border, just south of Memphis and approximately 3 miles (4.8 km) north of Olive Branch on Mississippi Highway 178. Mineral Wells is located on the former St. Louis–San Francisco Railway.

A post office operated under the name Mineral Wells from 1910 to 1994.
