= Mississippi Highway 366 =

Mississippi Highway 366 can refer to either of two state highways in Mississippi that share the same number, but were never connected.

- Mississippi Highway 366 (Prentiss County)
- Mississippi Highway 366 (Tishomingo County)

Browse numbered routes
← MS 365	MS	→ MS 367
