= Winborn, Mississippi =

- Unincorporated community
- Location within Mississippi Location within the United States
- Coordinates: 34°37′52″N 89°16′23″W
- Country: United States
- State: Mississippi
- County: Benton
- Elevation: 367 ft (112 m)
- Time zone: UTC-6 (Central (CST))
  - Summer (DST): UTC-5 (CDT)
- Area code: 662
- GNIS feature ID: 695191

Winborn, also known as Reids Switch, is an unincorporated community in Benton County, Mississippi, United States.

== History ==
The area surrounding Winborn was found to have large deposits of carbonate iron ore. In 1912, businessman from Birmingham chartered the Memphis Mining and Manufacturing Company to process this iron ore. A railroad spur and charcoal blast furnace were constructed. The furnace had a capacity for ten tons per day and produced 125 tons of pig iron before closing. After the furnace closed, the iron ore was mined for paint pigment.

A post office operated under the name Reids Switch from 1902 to 1905 and under the name Winborn from 1905 to 1956.
