= Mooreville, Mississippi =

- Census-designated place
- Location within Mississippi Location within the United States
- Coordinates: 34°15′54″N 88°34′37″W
- Country: United States
- State: Mississippi
- County: Lee

Area
  - Total: 2.80 sq mi (7.24 km^{2})
  - Land: 2.80 sq mi (7.24 km^{2})
  - Water: 0 sq mi (0.00 km^{2})
- Elevation: 394 ft (120 m)

Population (2020)
  - Total: 859
  - Density: 307.4/sq mi (118.69/km^{2})
- Time zone: UTC-6 (Central (CST))
  - Summer (DST): UTC-5 (CDT)
- ZIP code: 38857
- Area code: 662
- GNIS feature ID: 2586604
- FIPS code: 28-48720

Mooreville, sometimes misspelled as Mooresville, is an unincorporated community and census-designated place (CDP) in Lee County, Mississippi, United States. As of the 2020 census, Mooreville had a population of 859.

Mooreville is part of the Tupelo Micropolitan Statistical Area. It has a post office and a ZIP code (38857).

== History ==
The community was named for the Moore family, its first settlers.

In 1900, Mooreville had an academy, three churches, a masonic lodge, and a Woodmen of the World lodge. It also had a population of 54.

== Geography ==
Mooreville is in eastern Lee County along Mississippi Highway 178, 7 miles (11 km) east of the center of Tupelo, the county seat, and 4 miles (6 km) west of Dorsey. The Interstate 22 / U.S. Route 78 freeway forms the northern edge of the community, with access from Exit 94 (Highway 371). I-22/US-78 lead northwest 113 miles (182 km) to Memphis, Tennessee, and southeast 124 miles (200 km) to Birmingham, Alabama. Highway 371 leads northeast 7 miles (11 km) to Mantachie and south 19 miles (31 km) to Bigbee.

According to the U.S. Census Bureau, the Mooreville CDP has an area of 2.8 square miles (7.2 km^{2}), all of it recorded as land. Boguefala Creek flows through the eastern side. The creeks flow south-southeast to the Tombigbee River north of Amory. South Tulip Creek forms the western edge of the CDP; the creek flows southwest to Tulip Creek and thence Town Creek, which flows south-southeast to the Tombigbee south of Amory. The Lee-Itawamba county line forms the eastern edge of the CDP.

== Demographics ==
Historical population
Census	Pop.	Note	%±
2010	650		—
2020	859		32.2%
U.S. Decennial Census

Mooreville first appeared as a census designated place in the 2010 U.S. census.

== Education ==
It is in the Lee County School District.

== Notable people ==
- Thomas K. Boggan, member of the Mississippi State Senate from 1916 to 1920
- Olin Francis, actor
- Jamie Franks, member of the Mississippi House of Representatives from 2000 to 2007
- Ray Harris, rockabilly musician and songwriter
- Peggy Webb, author
