= Bigbee, Mississippi =

- Unincorporated community
- Location within Mississippi Location within the United States
- Coordinates: 34°00′58″N 88°31′09″W
- Country: United States
- State: Mississippi
- County: Monroe
- Elevation: 220 ft (67 m)
- Time zone: UTC-6 (Central (CST))
  - Summer (DST): UTC-5 (CDT)
- Area code: 662
- GNIS feature ID: 667157

Bigbee (also known as Johnsons Mill) is an unincorporated community in Monroe County, Mississippi. Bigbee is located northwest of Amory on Mississippi Highway 6 close to its intersection with Mississippi Highway 371.

== History ==
Bigbee derives its name from shortening and alteration of the nearby East Fork Tombigbee River.

Bigbee is located along the BNSF Railway and in 1910 had two general stores and a sawmill.

In 1892, George and Frank Houston built a sawmill in Bigbee at the junction of the Tombigbee River and the St. Louis–San Francisco Railway. The sawmill was in operation until 1903. The Houston Brothers' sawmill in Bigbee was one of the largest in Monroe County. The sawmill allowed Bigbee to be the second community in the county with electric lights and also operated a hotel and commissary.

In 1906, Bigbee had an estimated population of 250.

Bigbee is served by the Bigbee Community Center.

A post office operated under the name Bigbee from 1890 to 1912.
