= Marietta, Mississippi =

- Town
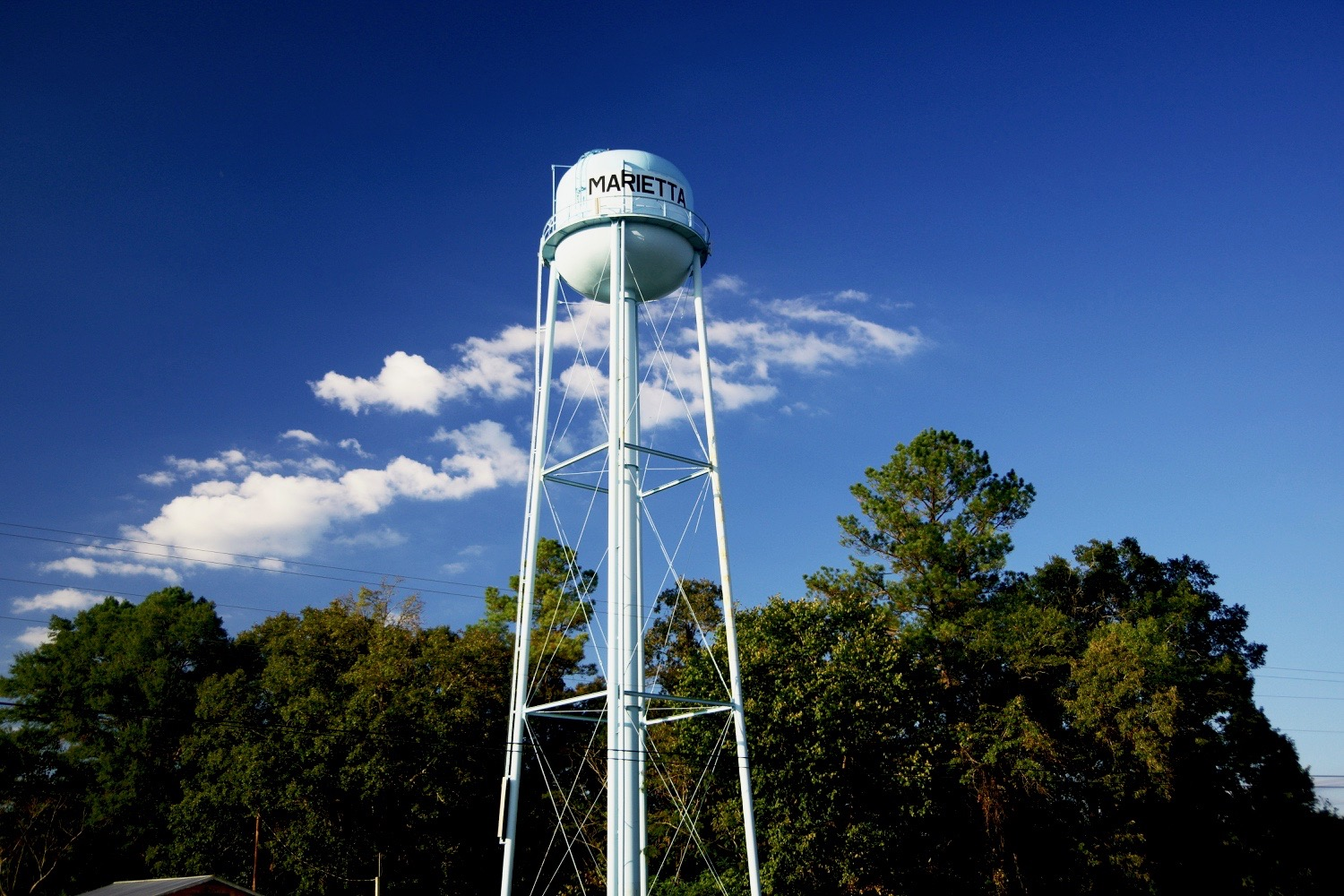
- Water tower in Marietta

- Location of Marietta, Mississippi

- Location in the United States
- Coordinates: 34°30′12″N 88°28′18″W
- Country: United States
- State: Mississippi
- County: Prentiss

Area
  - Total: 1.78 sq mi (4.61 km^{2})
  - Land: 1.78 sq mi (4.61 km^{2})
  - Water: 0 sq mi (0.00 km^{2})
- Elevation: 345 ft (105 m)

Population (2020)
  - Total: 198
  - Density: 111.2/sq mi (42.94/km^{2})
- Time zone: UTC-6 (Central (CST))
  - Summer (DST): UTC-5 (CDT)
- ZIP code: 38856
- Area code: 662
- FIPS code: 28-45120
- GNIS feature ID: 2406096

Marietta is a town in Prentiss County, Mississippi, United States. As of the 2020 census, Marietta had a population of 198.

== Geography ==
Marietta is situated at the intersection of Mississippi Highway 366 and Mississippi Highway 371, southeast of Booneville, and northwest of Fulton. The Natchez Trace Parkway passes just to the south.

According to the United States Census Bureau, the town has a total area of 1.8 square miles (4.7 km^{2}), all land.

== Demographics ==
Historical population
Census	Pop.	Note	%±
1880	63		—
1910	146		—
1970	204		—
1980	298		46.1%
1990	287		−3.7%
2000	248		−13.6%
2010	256		3.2%
2020	198		−22.7%
U.S. Decennial Census

As of the census of 2000, there were 248 people, 103 households, and 73 families residing in the town. The population density was 139.3 inhabitants per square mile (53.8/km^{2}). There were 111 housing units at an average density of 62.3 per square mile (24.1/km^{2}). The racial makeup of the town was 98.79% White and 1.21% African American. Hispanic or Latino of any race.

There were 103 households, out of which 29.1% had children under the age of 18 living with them, 63.1% were married couples living together, 8.7% had a female householder with no husband present, and 28.2% were non-families. 25.2% of all households were made up of individuals, and 13.6% had someone living alone who was 65 years of age or older. The average household size was 2.41 and the average family size was 2.91.

In the town, the population was spread out, with 21.8% under the age of 18, 10.1% from 18 to 24, 24.6% from 25 to 44, 26.2% from 45 to 64, and 17.3% who were 65 years of age or older. The median age was 40 years. For every 100 females, there were 96.8 males. For every 100 females age 18 and over, there were 90.2 males.

The median income for a household in the town was $35,000, and the median income for a family was $40,833. Males had a median income of $30,357 versus $19,583 for females. The per capita income for the town was $14,228. About 6.1% of families and 8.5% of the population were below the poverty line, including 3.4% of those under the age of eighteen and 23.1% of those 65 or over.

== Education ==
The Town of Marietta is served by the Prentiss County School District.

== Notable people ==
- Ellen Stratton, model.
