= Saltillo, Mississippi =

City in Mississippi, United States

- City
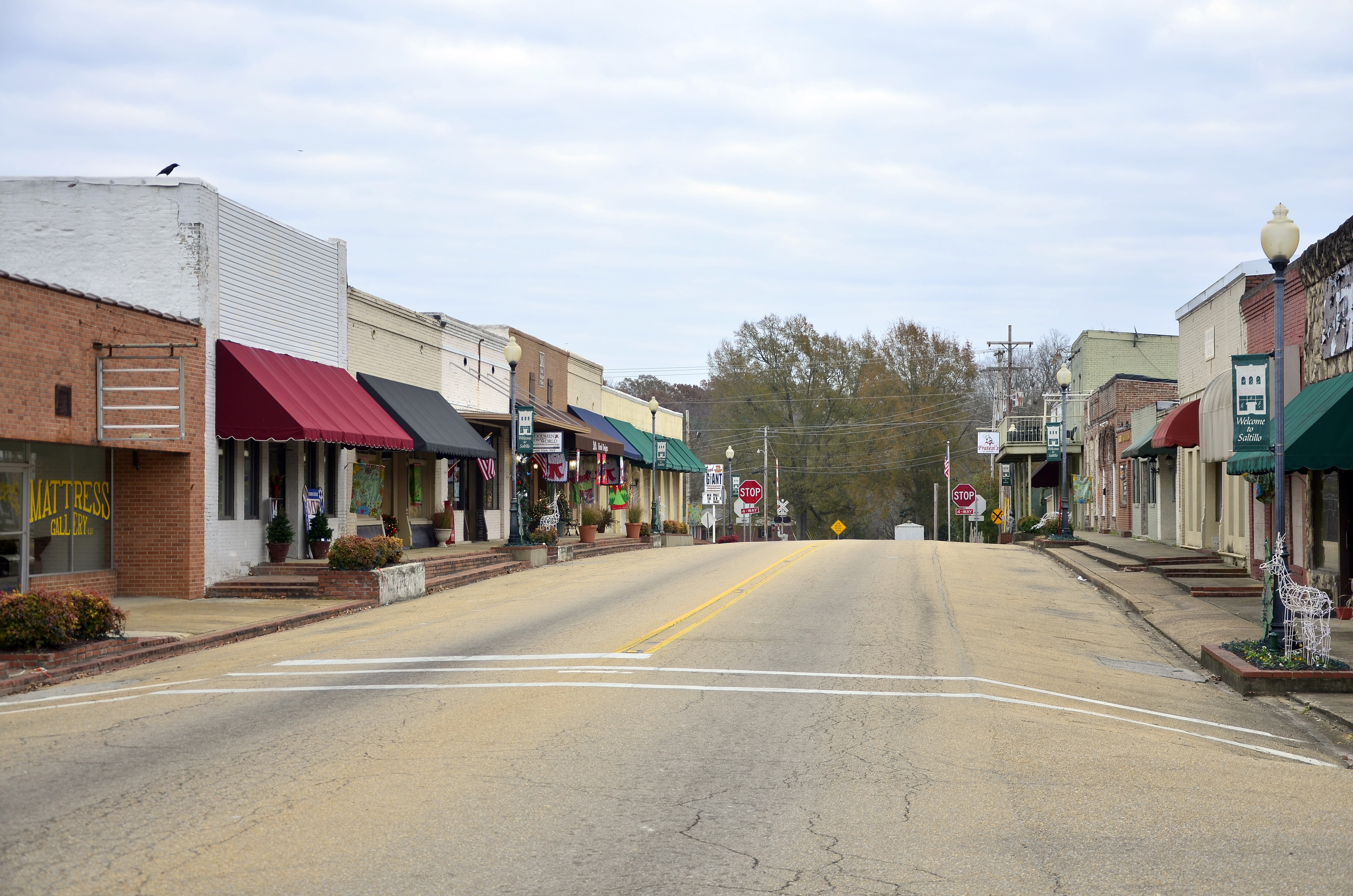
- Downtown Saltillo

- Flag

- Location in Lee county and Mississippi

- Location in the United States
- Coordinates: 34°22′23″N 88°41′22″W
- Country: United States
- State: Mississippi
- County: Lee
- Districts: 1, 2
- Founded: July 20, 1849
- Incorporated: July 20, 1870
- Named for: Saltillo, Mexico

Government
  - Type: Mayor–Council
  - Mayor: Copey Grantham (I)
  - Council: Board of Aldermen

Area
  - Total: 8.21 sq mi (21.26 km^{2})
  - Land: 8.19 sq mi (21.20 km^{2})
  - Water: 0.019 sq mi (0.05 km^{2})
- Elevation: 322 ft (98 m)

Population (2020)
  - Total: 4,922
  - Density: 601.2/sq mi (232.13/km^{2})
- Time zone: UTC-6 (Central (CST))
  - Summer (DST): UTC-5 (CDT)
- ZIP code(s): 38866
- Area code: 662
- FIPS code: 28-64840
- GNIS feature ID: 677306
- Highways: U.S. Highway 45; Highway 363; Highway 766
- Major airport: Memphis Airport (MEM)
- Website: saltilloms.org

Saltillo is a city in Lee County, Mississippi, United States. It is located in the northern part of the Tupelo micropolitan area. Founded in 1849, the population was 4,922 at the 2020 Census.

== History ==
A post office was built at Saltillo on July 20, 1849.

By November 1860, the Mobile and Ohio Railroad had built a line through Saltillo. A station had been established by 1874.

The town was incorporated on July 20, 1870.

== Geography ==
According to the United States Census Bureau, the town has a total area of 8.7 square miles (23 km^{2}), of which 8.7 square miles (23 km^{2}) is land and 0.04 square miles (0.10 km^{2}) (0.23%) is water.

== Demographics ==
Historical population
Census	Pop.	Note	%±
1870	148		—
1880	262		77.0%
1900	209		—
1910	306		46.4%
1920	440		43.8%
1930	432		−1.8%
1940	468		8.3%
1950	501		7.1%
1960	536		7.0%
1970	836		56.0%
1980	1,271		52.0%
1990	1,782		40.2%
2000	3,393		90.4%
2010	4,752		40.1%
2020	4,922		3.6%
U.S. Decennial Census

=== 2020 census ===
As of the 2020 census, Saltillo had a population of 4,922. The median age was 37.0 years. 25.7% of residents were under the age of 18 and 14.0% of residents were 65 years of age or older. For every 100 females there were 90.5 males, and for every 100 females age 18 and over there were 86.4 males age 18 and over.

0.0% of residents lived in urban areas, while 100.0% lived in rural areas.

There were 1,938 households in Saltillo, of which 36.8% had children under the age of 18 living in them. Of all households, 51.0% were married-couple households, 15.9% were households with a male householder and no spouse or partner present, and 28.6% were households with a female householder and no spouse or partner present. About 27.9% of all households were made up of individuals and 10.9% had someone living alone who was 65 years of age or older.

There were 2,085 housing units, of which 7.1% were vacant. The homeowner vacancy rate was 1.1% and the rental vacancy rate was 15.4%.

Racial composition as of the 2020 census
Race	Number	Percent
White	3,872	78.7%
Black or African American	759	15.4%
American Indian and Alaska Native	6	0.1%
Asian	46	0.9%
Native Hawaiian and Other Pacific Islander	4	0.1%
Some other race	42	0.9%
Two or more races	193	3.9%
Hispanic or Latino (of any race)	99	2.0%

=== 2000 census ===
As of the census of 2000, there were 3,393 people, 1,361 households, and 974 families residing in the town. The population density was 389.5 inhabitants per square mile (150.4/km^{2}). There were 1,453 housing units at an average density of 166.8 per square mile (64.4/km^{2}). The racial makeup of the town was 93.93% White, 4.69% African American, 0.06% Native American, 0.47% Asian, 0.03% Pacific Islander, 0.09% from other races, and 0.74% from two or more races. Hispanic or Latino of any race were 0.59% of the population.

There were 1,361 households, out of which 38.3% had children under the age of 18 living with them, 57.0% were married couples living together, 10.9% had a female householder with no husband present, and 28.4% were non-families. 25.6% of all households were made up of individuals, and 8.4% had someone living alone who was 65 years of age or older. The average household size was 2.45 and the average family size was 2.94.

In the town the population was spread out, with 26.9% under the age of 18, 9.0% from 18 to 24, 34.0% from 25 to 44, 19.2% from 45 to 64, and 10.8% who were 65 years of age or older. The median age was 33 years. For every 100 females, there were 87.9 males. For every 100 females age 18 and over, there were 86.0 males.

The median income for a household in the town was $35,912, and the median income for a family was $44,018. Males had a median income of $33,333 versus $23,542 for females. The per capita income for the town was $16,177. About 8.5% of families and 12.7% of the population were below the poverty line, including 13.7% of those under age 18 and 17.3% of those age 65 or over.

== Education ==
Most of Saltillo is served by the Lee County School District while a portion is in the Tupelo School District. The former operates Saltillo High School. The sole high school of the latter is Tupelo High School.

== Notable people ==
- Andy Dillard, American baseball player
- Steve Dillard (born 1951), American baseball player
- Tim Dillard (born 1983), American baseball player
- James Gilreath (1936–2003), American musician
- Kathryn Kelly, convicted bootlegger. Fourth wife of Machine Gun Kelly.
- Trent Kelly, member of the United States House of Representatives from Mississippi's 1st congressional district
- Merle Taylor (1927–1987), American musician

== See also ==
- List of municipalities in Mississippi
- National Register of Historic Places listings in Lee County, Mississippi
