= Lee County, Mississippi =

County in Mississippi, United States

- County
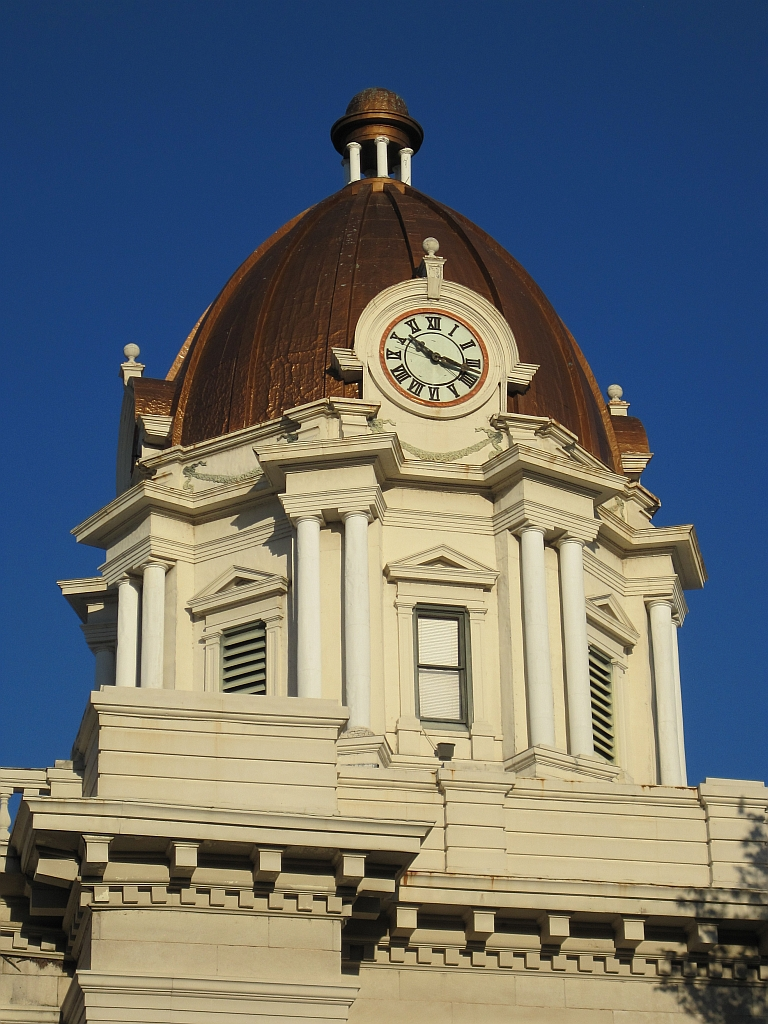
- Clock tower of the Lee County Courthouse

- Location within the U.S. state of Mississippi
- Country: United States
- State: Mississippi
- Founded: October 26, 1866 (160 years ago)
- Named for: Gen. Robert E. Lee
- Seat: Tupelo
- Largest city: Tupelo

Area
  - Total: 453 sq mi (1,170 km^{2})
  - Land: 450 sq mi (1,165 km^{2})
  - Water: 3.2 sq mi (8.3 km^{2}) 0.7%

Population (2020)
  - Total: 83,343
  - Estimate (2025): 83,731 ▲
  - Density: 185.3/sq mi (71.54/km^{2})
- Time zone: UTC−6 (Central)
  - Summer (DST): UTC−5 (CDT)
- ZIP Codes: 38801, 38804, 38824, 38826, 38828, 38843, 38849, 38857, 38858, 38860, 38862, 38866, 38868, 38879
- Area code: 662
- Congressional district: 1st
- Website: leecountyms.com

Lee County is a county in U.S. state of Mississippi. At the 2020 census, the population was 83,343. Its county seat is Tupelo. Lee County is included in the Tupelo Micropolitan Statistical Area.

== History ==
Lee County was established by the Mississippi Legislature on October 26, 1866, and named for General Robert E. Lee, General in Chief of the Armies of the Confederate States. It was formed from Itawamba and Pontotoc counties; therefore, the record and list of early settlers mentioned in those counties embrace a great number who were residents of what is present day Lee County.

== Geography ==
According to the U.S. Census Bureau, the county has a total area of 453 square miles (1,170 km^{2}), of which 450 square miles (1,200 km^{2}) is land and 3.2 square miles (8.3 km^{2}) (0.7%) is water.

=== Major highways ===
- Interstate 22
- U.S. Highway 45
- U.S. Highway 78
- U.S. Route 278
- Natchez Trace Parkway
- Mississippi Highway 6
- Mississippi Highway 145
- Mississippi Highway 178
- Mississippi Highway 363
- Mississippi Highway 245
- Mississippi Highway 371
- Mississippi Highway 370

=== Adjacent counties ===
- Prentiss County (north)
- Itawamba County (east)
- Monroe County (southeast)
- Chickasaw County (southwest)
- Pontotoc County (west)
- Union County (northwest)

=== National protected areas ===
- Brices Cross Roads National Battlefield Site
- Natchez Trace Parkway (part)
- Tupelo National Battlefield

== Demographics ==
Historical population
Census	Pop.	Note	%±
1870	15,955		—
1880	20,470		28.3%
1890	20,040		−2.1%
1900	21,956		9.6%
1910	28,894		31.6%
1920	29,618		2.5%
1930	35,313		19.2%
1940	38,838		10.0%
1950	38,237		−1.5%
1960	40,589		6.2%
1970	46,148		13.7%
1980	57,061		23.6%
1990	65,581		14.9%
2000	75,755		15.5%
2010	82,910		9.4%
2020	83,343		0.5%
2025 (est.)	83,731	▲	0.5%
U.S. Decennial Census; 1790-1960 1900-1990; 1990-2000 2010-2013 2018

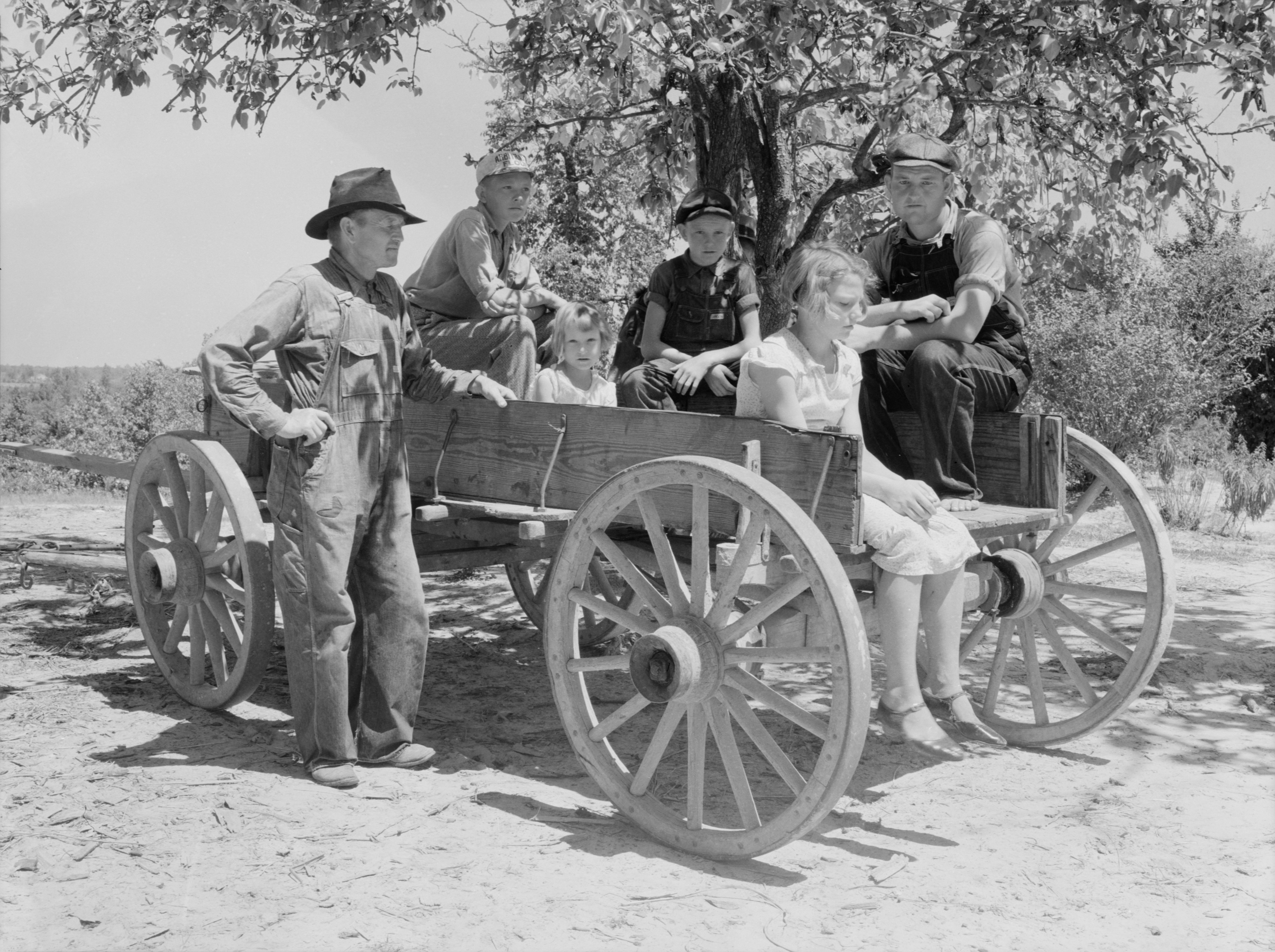
Family in a wagon in Lee County, 1935. Photo by Arthur Rothstein.

=== Racial and ethnic composition ===
Lee County, Mississippi – Racial and ethnic composition Note: the US Census treats Hispanic/Latino as an ethnic category. This table excludes Latinos from the racial categories and assigns them to a separate category. Hispanics/Latinos may be of any race.
Race / Ethnicity (NH = Non-Hispanic)	Pop 1980	Pop 1990	Pop 2000	Pop 2010	Pop 2020	% 1980	% 1990	% 2000	% 2010	% 2020
White alone (NH)	45,019	51,059	55,367	56,854	52,854	78.90%	77.86%	73.09%	68.57%	63.42%
Black or African American alone (NH)	11,538	13,972	18,495	22,498	24,131	20.22%	21.30%	24.41%	27.14%	28.95%
Native American or Alaska Native alone (NH)	36	57	93	120	94	0.06%	0.09%	0.12%	0.14%	0.11%
Asian alone (NH)	71	129	393	513	920	0.12%	0.20%	0.52%	0.62%	1.10%
Native Hawaiian or Pacific Islander alone (NH)	x	x	7	19	25	x	x	0.01%	0.02%	0.03%
Other race alone (NH)	30	4	24	33	181	0.05%	0.01%	0.03%	0.04%	0.22%
Mixed race or Multiracial (NH)	x	x	494	882	2,310	x	x	0.65%	1.06%	2.77%
Hispanic or Latino (any race)	367	360	882	1,991	2,828	0.64%	0.55%	1.16%	2.40%	3.39%
Total	57,061	65,581	75,755	82,910	83,343	100.00%	100.00%	100.00%	100.00%	100.00%

=== 2020 census ===
As of the 2020 census, the county had a population of 83,343. The median age was 39.4 years. 23.6% of residents were under the age of 18 and 17.2% of residents were 65 years of age or older. For every 100 females there were 91.5 males, and for every 100 females age 18 and over there were 88.3 males age 18 and over.

The racial makeup of the county was 64.1% White, 29.1% Black or African American, 0.2% American Indian and Alaska Native, 1.1% Asian, <0.1% Native Hawaiian and Pacific Islander, 2.0% from some other race, and 3.5% from two or more races. Hispanic or Latino residents of any race comprised 3.4% of the population.

48.3% of residents lived in urban areas, while 51.7% lived in rural areas.

There were 33,499 households in the county, of which 31.6% had children under the age of 18 living in them. Of all households, 44.5% were married-couple households, 18.5% were households with a male householder and no spouse or partner present, and 31.9% were households with a female householder and no spouse or partner present. About 30.0% of all households were made up of individuals and 12.4% had someone living alone who was 65 years of age or older.

There were 37,261 housing units, of which 10.1% were vacant. Among occupied housing units, 67.9% were owner-occupied and 32.1% were renter-occupied. The homeowner vacancy rate was 1.2% and the rental vacancy rate was 14.9%.

=== 2000 census ===
As of the census of 2000, there were 75,755 people, 29,200 households, and 20,819 families residing in the county. The population density was 168 inhabitants per square mile (65/km^{2}). There were 31,887 housing units at an average density of 71 per square mile (27/km^{2}). The racial makeup of the county was 73.66% White, 24.51% Black or African American, 0.13% Native American, 0.52% Asian, 0.01% Pacific Islander, 0.43% from other races, and 0.74% from two or more races. 1.16% of the population were Hispanic or Latino of any race. There were 29,200 households, out of which 36.10% had children under the age of 18 living with them, 52.60% were married couples living together, 14.60% had a female householder with no husband present, and 28.70% were non-families. 25.00% of all households were made up of individuals, and 8.50% had someone living alone who was 65 years of age or older. The average household size was 2.55 and the average family size was 3.05. In the county, the population was spread out, with 27.70% under the age of 18, 8.50% from 18 to 24, 30.50% from 25 to 44, 21.80% from 45 to 64, and 11.50% who were 65 years of age or older. The median age was 35 years. For every 100 females, there were 92.30 males. For every 100 females age 18 and over, there were 87.50 males. The median income for a household in the county was $36,165, and the median income for a family was $43,149. Males had a median income of $31,039 versus $22,235 for females. The per capita income for the county was $18,956. About 10.50% of families and 13.40% of the population were below the poverty line, including 17.90% of those under age 18 and 15.50% of those age 65 or over. Lee County has the ninth highest per capita income in the state of Mississippi.

== Communities ==
=== Cities ===
- Baldwyn (partly in Prentiss County)
- Saltillo
- Tupelo (county seat)
- Verona
- Nettleton (Partly in Monroe County)
- Guntown

=== Towns ===
- Plantersville
- Shannon
- Sherman (partly in Pontotoc County and Union County)

=== Census-designated places ===
- Mooreville

=== Unincorporated communities ===
- Barrett Ridge
- Belden
- Brewer
- Eggville
- Jug Fork

== Education ==
Lee County is served by the Baldwyn, Lee County, Nettleton, and Tupelo school districts.

== Politics ==
Lee County has been a Republican stronghold since the mid-1980s. The last Democratic presidential candidate who carried this county was Jimmy Carter in the election of 1980.

United States presidential election results for Lee County, Mississippi
Year	Republican		Democratic		Third party(ies)	
Year	No.	%	No.	%	No.	%
1912	39	2.62%	1,390	93.54%	57	3.84%
1916	91	5.12%	1,683	94.60%	5	0.28%
1920	302	15.38%	1,652	84.11%	10	0.51%
1924	152	5.48%	2,621	94.52%	0	0.00%
1928	367	11.75%	2,757	88.25%	0	0.00%
1932	129	3.36%	3,704	96.51%	5	0.13%
1936	42	1.16%	3,585	98.84%	0	0.00%
1940	120	3.05%	3,814	96.93%	1	0.03%
1944	230	6.15%	3,509	93.85%	0	0.00%
1948	82	2.13%	636	16.54%	3,128	81.33%
1952	2,002	32.42%	4,174	67.58%	0	0.00%
1956	929	18.01%	3,883	75.30%	345	6.69%
1960	1,550	23.34%	3,653	55.01%	1,438	21.65%
1964	5,165	68.19%	2,409	31.81%	0	0.00%
1968	2,522	18.45%	1,912	13.99%	9,232	67.55%
1972	10,730	82.60%	1,632	12.56%	629	4.84%
1976	7,366	45.10%	8,504	52.07%	463	2.83%
1980	8,326	44.08%	10,047	53.19%	516	2.73%
1984	13,312	67.47%	6,208	31.46%	210	1.06%
1988	13,767	66.42%	6,604	31.86%	357	1.72%
1992	12,231	54.36%	7,710	34.27%	2,560	11.38%
1996	11,815	54.48%	8,438	38.91%	1,433	6.61%
2000	15,551	61.97%	9,142	36.43%	401	1.60%
2004	20,254	66.14%	10,127	33.07%	240	0.78%
2008	22,694	64.91%	12,021	34.39%	245	0.70%
2012	22,415	63.49%	12,563	35.58%	328	0.93%
2016	22,220	67.51%	10,029	30.47%	664	2.02%
2020	24,207	65.51%	12,189	32.98%	558	1.51%
2024	24,339	68.87%	10,616	30.04%	383	1.08%

== See also ==
- List of memorials to Robert E. Lee
- National Register of Historic Places listings in Lee County, Mississippi
