= Hobo Station, Mississippi =

Unincorporated community in Mississippi, US

- Unincorporated community
- Location within Mississippi Location within the United States
- Coordinates: 34°33′39″N 88°27′58″W
- Country: United States
- State: Mississippi
- County: Prentiss
- Elevation: 413 ft (126 m)
- Time zone: UTC-6 (Central (CST))
  - Summer (DST): UTC-5 (CDT)
- Area code: 662
- GNIS feature ID: 671251

Hobo Station is an unincorporated community in Prentiss County, Mississippi, United States.

== History ==
Hobo Station was named for a shanty built at a rural intersection where hitchhikers would wait for passing motorists. The community was once home to a grocery store, cotton gin, and grist mill. As of 2002, a convenience store sits at the site of the former grocery store.
