= Fulton, Mississippi =

City in Mississippi, United States

- City
- City of Fulton
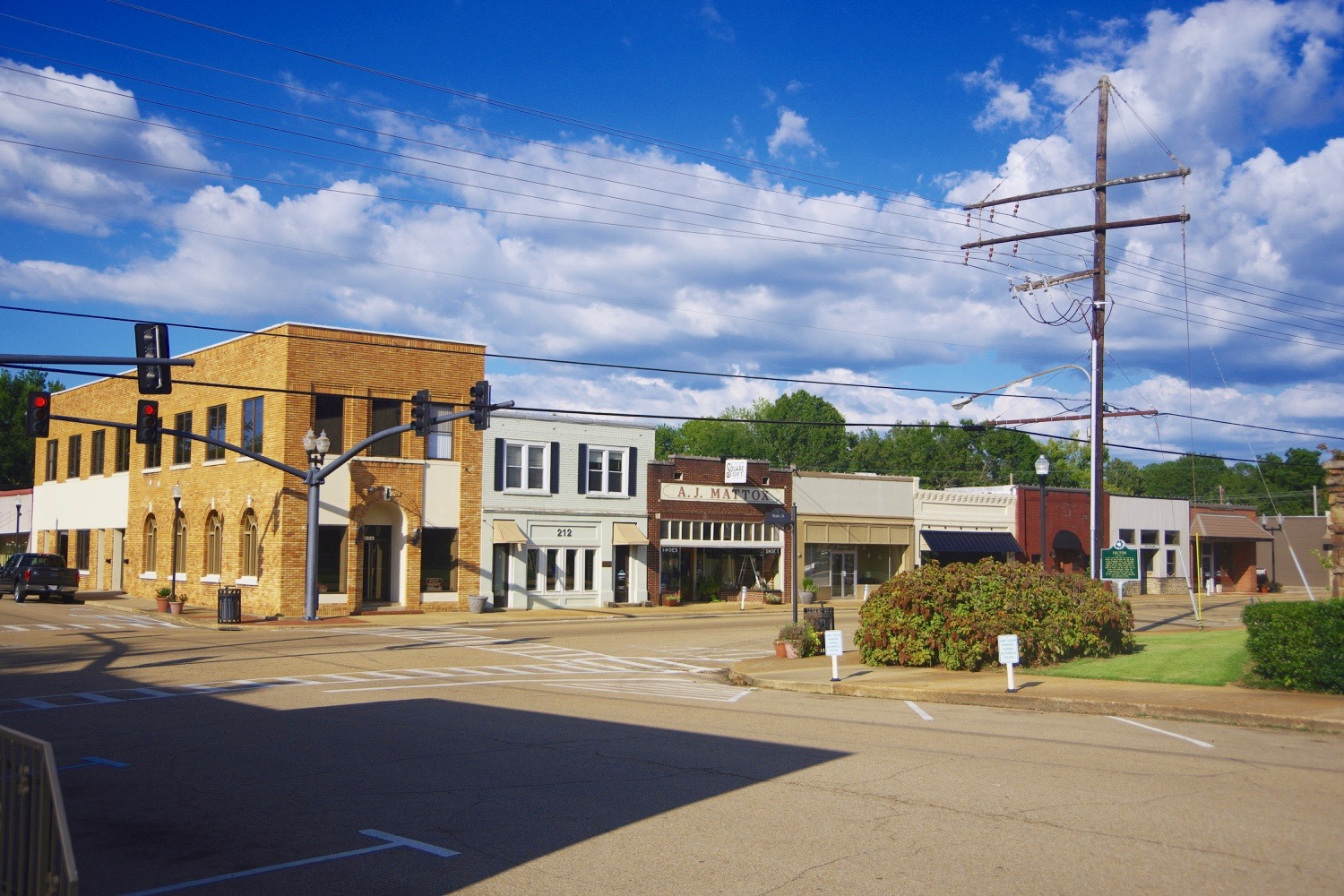
- Downtown Fulton

- Flag Seal

- Location in Itawamba county and Mississippi

- Location in the United States
- Coordinates: 34°15′40″N 88°24′05″W
- Country: United States
- State: Mississippi
- County: Itawamba
- Districts: 1, 4, 5
- Founded: July 26, 1837
- Incorporated: May 11, 1837
- Named for: Robert Fulton

Government
  - Type: Mayor–Council
  - Council: Board of Aldermen

Area
  - Total: 8.71 sq mi (22.55 km^{2})
  - Land: 8.49 sq mi (21.99 km^{2})
  - Water: 0.21 sq mi (0.55 km^{2})
- Elevation: 308 ft (94 m)

Population (2020)
  - Total: 4,542
  - Density: 534.9/sq mi (206.52/km^{2})
- Time zone: UTC-6 (Central (CST))
  - Summer (DST): UTC-5 (CDT)
- ZIP code: 38843
- Area code: 662
- FIPS code: 28-26300
- GNIS feature ID: 2403670
- Website: fulton.itawambams.com/fulton-city-hall/

Fulton is a city in and the county seat of Itawamba County, Mississippi, United States. The population was 4,542 at the 2020 census.

The city is part of the Tupelo Micropolitan Statistical Area.

== History ==
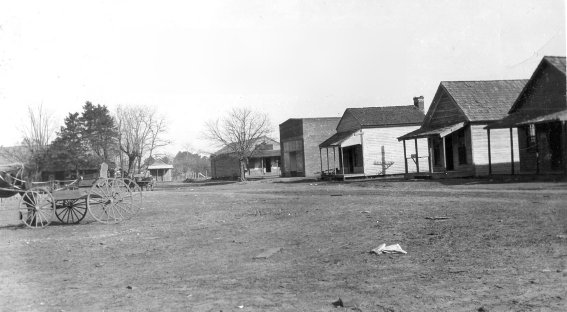
Fulton, circa 1890

Fulton is named for Robert Fulton, inventor of the steamboat. The city was incorporated on May 11, 1837. The U.S. post office was established on July 26, 1837, marking the official launch of the service in Fulton.

== Geography ==
Fulton is located west of the center of Itawamba County and is bordered to the west by the Tennessee–Tombigbee Waterway.

Interstate 22/U.S. Route 78 passes through the southern part of the city, with access from Exit 104 (S. Adams Street). I-22 leads west 19 miles (31 km) to Tupelo and east 25 miles (40 km) to Hamilton, Alabama. Mississippi Highway 25 passes through the southeastern part of Fulton, leading south 14 miles (23 km) to Smithville and north 26 miles (42 km) to Belmont.

According to the United States Census Bureau, Fulton has a total area of 8.7 square miles (22.6 km^{2}), of which 8.5 square miles (22.0 km^{2}) are land and 0.23 square miles (0.6 km^{2}), or 2.46%, are water.

== Demographics ==
Historical population
Census	Pop.	Note	%±
1850	275		—
1870	132		—
1880	249		88.6%
1890	172		−30.9%
1900	171		−0.6%
1910	194		13.5%
1920	227		17.0%
1930	927		308.4%
1940	1,154		24.5%
1950	1,343		16.4%
1960	1,706		27.0%
1970	2,899		69.9%
1980	3,238		11.7%
1990	3,387		4.6%
2000	3,882		14.6%
2010	3,961		2.0%
2020	4,542		14.7%
U.S. Decennial Census

=== 2020 census ===
As of the 2020 census, Fulton had a population of 4,542. The median age was 27.5 years. 21.2% of residents were under the age of 18 and 18.3% of residents were 65 years of age or older. For every 100 females there were 77.8 males, and for every 100 females age 18 and over there were 71.8 males age 18 and over.

0.0% of residents lived in urban areas, while 100.0% lived in rural areas.

There were 1,345 households in Fulton, of which 32.6% had children under the age of 18 living in them. Of all households, 42.0% were married-couple households, 17.7% were households with a male householder and no spouse or partner present, and 35.8% were households with a female householder and no spouse or partner present. About 31.3% of all households were made up of individuals and 14.6% had someone living alone who was 65 years of age or older.

There were 1,591 housing units, of which 15.5% were vacant. The homeowner vacancy rate was 2.2% and the rental vacancy rate was 19.9%.

Fulton racial composition
Race	Num.	Perc.
White (non-Hispanic)	3,439	75.72%
Black or African American (non-Hispanic)	795	17.5%
Native American	7	0.15%
Asian	15	0.33%
Other/Mixed	156	3.43%
Hispanic or Latino	130	2.86%

As of the 2020 census, there were 797 families residing in the city.

=== 2000 census ===
As of the census of 2000, there were 3,882 people, 1,357 households, and 891 families residing in the city. The population density was 450.3 inhabitants per square mile (173.9/km^{2}). There were 1,508 housing units at an average density of 174.9 per square mile (67.5/km^{2}). The racial makeup of the city was 83.69% White, 14.61% African American, 0.23% Native American, 0.52% Asian, 0.28% from other races, and 0.67% from two or more races. Hispanic or Latino of any race were 1.26% of the population.

There were 1,357 households, out of which 26.5% had children under the age of 18 living with them, 48.3% were married couples living together, 13.9% had a female householder with no husband present, and 34.3% were non-families. 31.8% of all households were made up of individuals, and 16.5% had someone living alone who was 65 years of age or older. The average household size was 2.29 and the average family size was 2.88.

In the city, the population was spread out, with 18.7% under the age of 18, 21.3% from 18 to 24, 20.9% from 25 to 44, 19.3% from 45 to 64, and 19.8% who were 65 years of age or older. The median age was 35 years. For every 100 females, there were 83.5 males. For every 100 females aged 18 and over, there were 82.8 males.

The median income for a household in the city was $29,449, and the median income for a family was $42,287. Males had a median income of $33,490 versus $23,278 for females. The per capita income for the city was $15,540. About 9.7% of families and 16.9% of the population were below the poverty line, including 21.4% of those under age 18 and 17.2% of those age 65 or over.

== Education ==
Fulton is served by the Itawamba County School District.

== Media ==
- W39CA-D Channel 39 TV is a Unity Broadcasting Network station.

== Infrastructure ==
The Mississippian Railway provides rail service to local companies. The Tennessee–Tombigbee Waterway provides water transportation for industries in Fulton.

== Notable people ==
- Donnie Bell, member of the Mississippi House of Representatives
- Brian Dozier, MLB infielder, All-Star selection in 2015 and World Series champion in 2019
- Ally Ewing, LPGA Tour professional golfer
- Roy Gregory, former head football coach for Austin Peay State University
- Jimmie Lunceford, jazz alto saxophonist and bandleader in the swing era
- Maikhail Miller, former American football quarterback
- Vernon Presley, father of Elvis Presley
- Chad Ramey, PGA Tour professional golfer
- Lyonel Thomas Senter Jr., U.S. federal judge
- Samuel M. Taylor, congressman from Arkansas
- Peggy Welch, member of the Indiana House of Representatives
