= Hattiesburg metropolitan area =

Hattiesburg, Mississippi Area
- Metropolitan Statistical Area
- Hattiesburg, MS Metropolitan Statistical Area
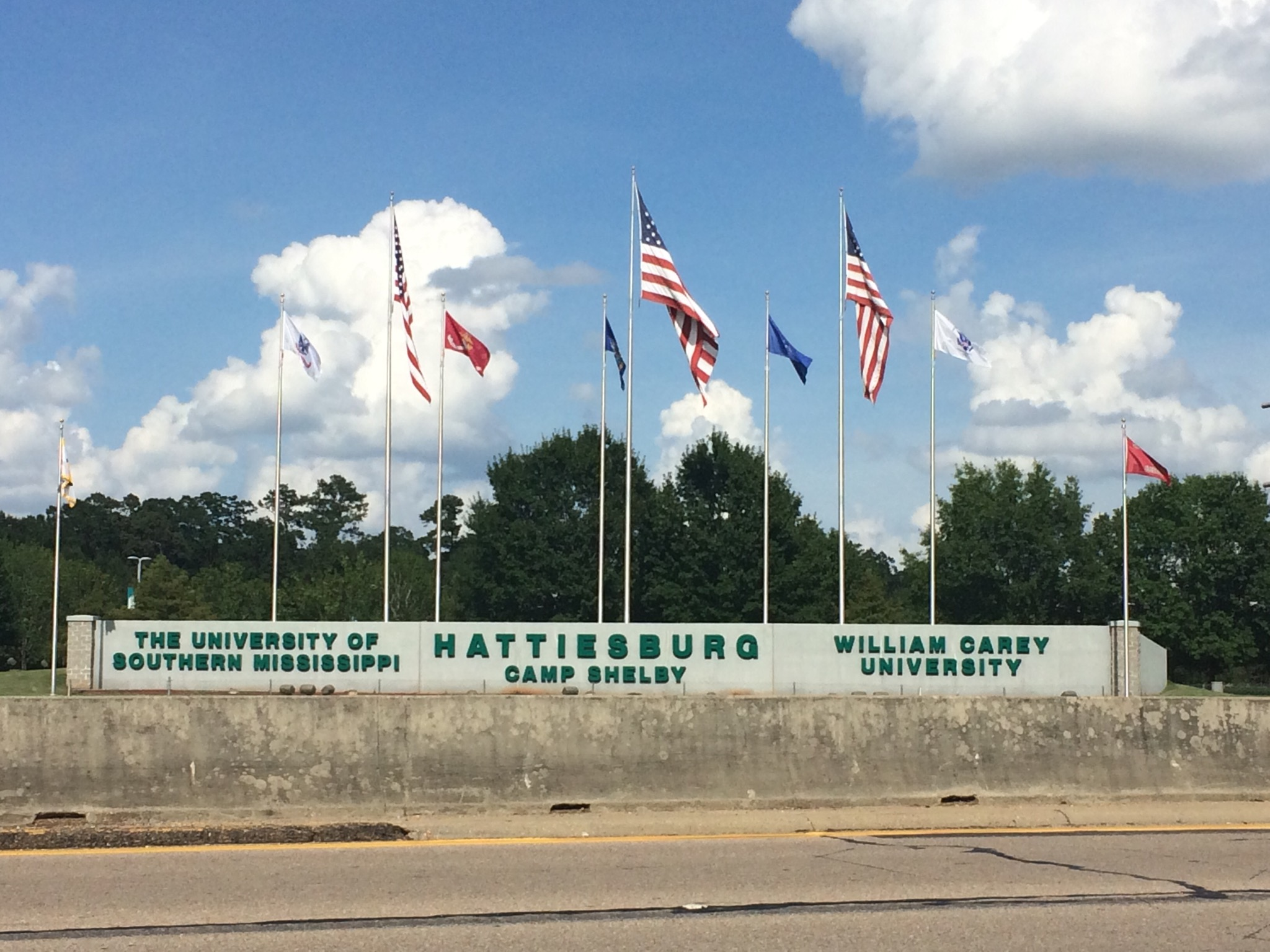
Interactive Map of Hattiesburg–Laurel, MS CSA
City of Hattiesburg
Hattiesburg, MS MSA
City of Laurel
Laurel, MS µSA
- Country: United States
- State: Mississippi
- Principal city: Hattiesburg
- Time zone: UTC-6 (CST)
  - Summer (DST): UTC-5 (CDT)

The Hattiesburg Metropolitan Statistical Area is a metropolitan statistical area (MSA) in southeastern Mississippi that covers three counties - Forrest, Lamar, and Perry. The MSA's principal city is Hattiesburg. The 2010 census placed the Hattiesburg MSA's population at 162,410, though estimates as of 2019 indicate the population has increased to 168,849. The area is part of the geographical region known as the Pine Belt, famous for its abundance of longleaf pine trees. The Hattiesburg MSA is part of the larger Hattiesburg-Laurel Combined Statistical Area.

== Counties ==
- Forrest
- Lamar
- Perry

== Demographics ==
As of the census of 2000, there were 123,812 people, 45,999 households, and 31,372 families residing within the MSA. The racial makeup of the MSA was 72.13% White, 25.96% African American, 0.20% Native American, 0.65% Asian, 0.02% Pacific Islander, 0.36% from other races, and 0.69% from two or more races. Hispanic or Latino of any race were 1.18% of the population.

The median income for a household in the MSA was $30,746, and the median income for a family was $37,731. Males had a median income of $30,221 versus $20,464 for females. The per capita income for the MSA was $15,615.

Historical population
| Census | Pop. | Note | %± |
|---|---|---|---|
| 1990 | 126,130 | | — |
| 2000 | 143,340 | | 13.6% |
| 2010 | 162,410 | | 13.3% |
| 2019 (est.) | 168,849 | | 4.0% |
https://www.census.gov/data.html

== Communities ==
=== Cities and towns ===
- Beaumont
- Hattiesburg (principal city)
- Lumberton
- New Augusta
- Petal
- Purvis
- Richton
- Sumrall

=== Census-designated places ===
- Arnold Line
- Rawls Springs
- West Hattiesburg

=== Unincorporated places ===
- Oak Grove
- Baxterville
- Brooklyn
- Carnes
- Fruitland Park
- Hintonville
- McLaurin
- Oloh
- Runnelstown

== See also ==
- Mississippi census statistical areas
- List of metropolitan areas in Mississippi
- List of micropolitan areas in Mississippi
- List of cities in Mississippi
- List of towns and villages in Mississippi
- List of census-designated places in Mississippi
- List of United States metropolitan areas
