= Mississippi statistical areas =

Coordinates: 32.7364°N 89.6678°W

The U.S. State of Mississippi currently has 27 statistical areas that have been delineated by the Office of Management and Budget (OMB). On February 21, 2026, the OMB delineated six combined statistical areas, four metropolitan statistical areas, and 18 micropolitan statistical areas in Mississippi. As of 2023, the most populous statistical area in the state is Jackson-Vicksburg-Brookhaven, MS CSA, comprising the metro area of its capital and largest city, Jackson.

== Statistical areas ==
The Office of Management and Budget (OMB) has designated more than 1,000 statistical areas for the United States and Puerto Rico. These statistical areas are important geographic delineations of population clusters used by the OMB, the United States Census Bureau, planning organizations, and federal, state, and local government entities.

The OMB defines a core-based statistical area (commonly referred to as a CBSA) as the county or counties (or county-equivalents) surrounding at least one densely-settled core of at least 10,000 population, "plus adjacent counties having a high degree of social and economic integration with the core as measured through commuting ties with the counties containing the core". The OMB further divides core-based statistical areas based on population into metropolitan statistical areas (MSAs) for those with at least 50,000 and micropolitan statistical areas (μSAs) for those with 10,000 to 49,999 people.

The OMB defines a combined statistical area (CSA) as two or more adjacent core-based statistical areas where the employment interchange rate (% commuting from A to B plus % commuting from B to A) is at least 15%. The primary statistical areas (PSAs) include all combined statistical areas and any core-based statistical area that is not a constituent of a combined statistical area.

The 27 United States statistical areas and 82 counties of the State of Mississippi (Note: An out-of-state area and its population are displayed in green. An area that extends into more than one state is displayed in purple. A purple population number over a black population number show the total population versus the in-state population. The state's abbreviation is also shown next to the in-state total.)
Combined statistical area	2025 population (est.)	Core-based statistical area	2025 population (est.)	County	2025 population (est.)
Jackson-Vicksburg-Brookhaven-Yazoo City, MS CSA	686,618	Jackson, MS MSA	609,847	Hinds County, Mississippi	211,888
Jackson-Vicksburg-Brookhaven-Yazoo City, MS CSA	686,618	Jackson, MS MSA	609,847	Rankin County, Mississippi	162,181
Jackson-Vicksburg-Brookhaven-Yazoo City, MS CSA	686,618	Jackson, MS MSA	609,847	Madison County, Mississippi	116,298
Jackson-Vicksburg-Brookhaven-Yazoo City, MS CSA	686,618	Jackson, MS MSA	609,847	Copiah County, Mississippi	27,497
Jackson-Vicksburg-Brookhaven-Yazoo City, MS CSA	686,618	Jackson, MS MSA	609,847	Scott County, Mississippi	28,073
Jackson-Vicksburg-Brookhaven-Yazoo City, MS CSA	686,618	Jackson, MS MSA	609,847	Simpson County, Mississippi	25,498
Jackson-Vicksburg-Brookhaven-Yazoo City, MS CSA	686,618	Jackson, MS MSA	609,847	Yazoo County, Mississippi	22,947
Jackson-Vicksburg-Brookhaven-Yazoo City, MS CSA	686,618	Vicksburg, MS μSA	41,759	Warren County, Mississippi	41,759
Jackson-Vicksburg-Brookhaven-Yazoo City, MS CSA	686,618	Brookhaven, MS μSA	35,012	Lincoln County, Mississippi	35,012
none		Gulfport-Biloxi, MS MSA	431,329	Harrison County, Mississippi	217,136
none		Gulfport-Biloxi, MS MSA	431,329	Jackson County, Mississippi	147,666
none		Gulfport-Biloxi, MS MSA	431,329	Hancock County, Mississippi	46,873
none		Gulfport-Biloxi, MS MSA	431,329	Stone County, Mississippi	19,654
Memphis-Forrest City, TN-MS-AR CSA	1,383,061; 297,467 (MS)	Memphis, TN-MS-AR MSA	1,335,674; 272,303 (MS)	Shelby County, Tennessee	910,226
Memphis-Forrest City, TN-MS-AR CSA	1,383,061; 297,467 (MS)	Memphis, TN-MS-AR MSA	1,335,674; 272,303 (MS)	DeSoto County, Mississippi	197,918
Memphis-Forrest City, TN-MS-AR CSA	1,383,061; 297,467 (MS)	Memphis, TN-MS-AR MSA	1,335,674; 272,303 (MS)	Tipton County, Tennessee	62,287
Memphis-Forrest City, TN-MS-AR CSA	1,383,061; 297,467 (MS)	Memphis, TN-MS-AR MSA	1,335,674; 272,303 (MS)	Crittenden County, Arkansas	46,210
Memphis-Forrest City, TN-MS-AR CSA	1,383,061; 297,467 (MS)	Memphis, TN-MS-AR MSA	1,335,674; 272,303 (MS)	Fayette County, Tennessee	45,071
Memphis-Forrest City, TN-MS-AR CSA	1,383,061; 297,467 (MS)	Memphis, TN-MS-AR MSA	1,335,674; 272,303 (MS)	Marshall County, Mississippi	34,654
Memphis-Forrest City, TN-MS-AR CSA	1,383,061; 297,467 (MS)	Memphis, TN-MS-AR MSA	1,335,674; 272,303 (MS)	Tate County, Mississippi	28,725
Memphis-Forrest City, TN-MS-AR CSA	1,383,061; 297,467 (MS)	Memphis, TN-MS-AR MSA	1,335,674; 272,303 (MS)	Tunica County, Mississippi	8,819
Memphis-Forrest City, TN-MS-AR CSA	1,383,061; 297,467 (MS)	Memphis, TN-MS-AR MSA	1,335,674; 272,303 (MS)	Benton County, Mississippi	7,502
Memphis-Forrest City, TN-MS-AR CSA	1,383,061; 297,467 (MS)	Forrest City, AR μSA	21,800	St. Francis County, Arkansas	21,800
Memphis-Forrest City, TN-MS-AR CSA	1,383,061; 297,467 (MS)	Clarksdale, MS μSA	19,849	Coahoma County, Mississippi	19,849
Hattiesburg-Laurel, MS CSA	240,295	Hattiesburg, MS MSA	158,014	Forrest County, Mississippi	79,034
Hattiesburg-Laurel, MS CSA	240,295	Hattiesburg, MS MSA	158,014	Lamar County, Mississippi	67,403
Hattiesburg-Laurel, MS CSA	240,295	Hattiesburg, MS MSA	158,014	Perry County, Mississippi	11,577
Hattiesburg-Laurel, MS CSA	240,295	Laurel, MS μSA	82,281	Jones County, Mississippi	66,496
Hattiesburg-Laurel, MS CSA	240,295	Laurel, MS μSA	82,281	Jasper County, Mississippi	15,785
Tupelo-Corinth, MS CSA	174,548	Tupelo, MS μSA	139,979	Lee County, Mississippi	83,731
Tupelo-Corinth, MS CSA	174,548	Tupelo, MS μSA	139,979	Prentiss County, Mississippi	25,284
Tupelo-Corinth, MS CSA	174,548	Tupelo, MS μSA	139,979	Itawamba County, Mississippi	24,152
Tupelo-Corinth, MS CSA	174,548	Corinth, MS μSA	34,569	Alcorn County, Mississippi	34,569
Starkville-Columbus, MS CSA	129,207	Columbus, MS μSA	67,144	Lowndes County, Mississippi	57,346
Starkville-Columbus, MS CSA	129,207	Columbus, MS μSA	67,144	Noxubee County, Mississippi	9,798
Starkville-Columbus, MS CSA	129,207	Starkville, MS μSA	62,063	Oktibbeha County, Mississippi	51,896
Starkville-Columbus, MS CSA	129,207	Starkville, MS μSA	62,063	Webster County, Mississippi	10,167
none		Meridian, MS μSA	85,419	Lauderdale County, Mississippi	70,317
none		Meridian, MS μSA	85,419	Clarke County, Mississippi	15,102
none		Oxford, MS μSA	71,972	Lafayette County, Mississippi	59,597
none		Oxford, MS μSA	71,972	Yalobusha County, Mississippi	12,375
New Orleans-Metairie-Slidell, LA-MS CSA	1,354,257; 59,363 (MS)	New Orleans-Metairie, LA MSA	970,849	Jefferson Parish, Louisiana	431,398
New Orleans-Metairie-Slidell, LA-MS CSA	1,354,257; 59,363 (MS)	New Orleans-Metairie, LA MSA	970,849	Orleans Parish, Louisiana	362,154
New Orleans-Metairie-Slidell, LA-MS CSA	1,354,257; 59,363 (MS)	New Orleans-Metairie, LA MSA	970,849	St. Charles Parish, Louisiana	50,586
New Orleans-Metairie-Slidell, LA-MS CSA	1,354,257; 59,363 (MS)	New Orleans-Metairie, LA MSA	970,849	St. Bernard Parish, Louisiana	45,642
New Orleans-Metairie-Slidell, LA-MS CSA	1,354,257; 59,363 (MS)	New Orleans-Metairie, LA MSA	970,849	St. John the Baptist Parish, Louisiana	39,875
New Orleans-Metairie-Slidell, LA-MS CSA	1,354,257; 59,363 (MS)	New Orleans-Metairie, LA MSA	970,849	Plaquemines Parish, Louisiana	22,256
New Orleans-Metairie-Slidell, LA-MS CSA	1,354,257; 59,363 (MS)	New Orleans-Metairie, LA MSA	970,849	St. James Parish, Louisiana	18,938
New Orleans-Metairie-Slidell, LA-MS CSA	1,354,257; 59,363 (MS)	Slidell-Mandeville-Covington, LA MSA	279,108	St. Tammany Parish, Louisiana	279,108
New Orleans-Metairie-Slidell, LA-MS CSA	1,354,257; 59,363 (MS)	Picayune, MS μSA	59,363	Pearl River County, Mississippi	59,363
New Orleans-Metairie-Slidell, LA-MS CSA	1,354,257; 59,363 (MS)	Bogalusa, LA μSA	44,937	Washington Parish, Louisiana	44,937
none		McComb, MS μSA	52,640	Pike County, Mississippi	38,712
none		McComb, MS μSA	52,640	Walthall County, Mississippi	13,928
none		Greenville, MS μSA	40,446	Washington County, Mississippi	40,446
none		Greenwood, MS μSA	34,912	Leflore County, Mississippi	25,686
none		Greenwood, MS μSA	34,912	Carroll County, Mississippi	9,226
none		Natchez, MS-LA μSA	54,722; 36,886 (MS)	Adams County, Mississippi	30,061
none		Natchez, MS-LA μSA	54,722; 36,886 (MS)	Concordia Parish, Louisiana	17,836
none		Natchez, MS-LA μSA	54,722; 36,886 (MS)	Jefferson County, Mississippi	6,825
none		Grenada, MS μSA	30,222	Grenada County, Mississippi	20,868
none		Grenada, MS μSA	30,222	Montgomery County, Mississippi	9,354
none		Cleveland, MS μSA	28,262	Bolivar County, Mississippi	28,262
none		none		Monroe County, Mississippi	33,318
none		none		Panola County, Mississippi	32,691
none		none		Pontotoc County, Mississippi	32,096
none		none		Neshoba County, Mississippi	28,732
none		none		Union County, Mississippi	28,459
none		none		George County, Mississippi	26,331
none		none		Sunflower County, Mississippi	22,893
none		none		Marion County, Mississippi	24,001
none		none		Tippah County, Mississippi	21,389
none		none		Leake County, Mississippi	21,662
none		none		Newton County, Mississippi	20,960
none		none		Wayne County, Mississippi	19,807
none		none		Tishomingo County, Mississippi	18,639
none		none		Clay County, Mississippi	18,238
none		none		Covington County, Mississippi	17,898
none		none		Winston County, Mississippi	17,473
none		none		Attala County, Mississippi	17,100
none		none		Chickasaw County, Mississippi	16,730
none		none		Holmes County, Mississippi	15,465
none		none		Smith County, Mississippi	13,991
none		none		Greene County, Mississippi	13,707
none		none		Calhoun County, Mississippi	12,643
none		none		Amite County, Mississippi	12,487
none		none		Tallahatchie County, Mississippi	10,877
none		none		Lawrence County, Mississippi	11,819
none		none		Jefferson Davis County, Mississippi	10,941
none		none		Claiborne County, Mississippi	8,058
none		none		Kemper County, Mississippi	8,600
none		none		Choctaw County, Mississippi	8,048
none		none		Wilkinson County, Mississippi	7,582
none		none		Franklin County, Mississippi	7,491
none		none		Humphreys County, Mississippi	7,001
none		none		Quitman County, Mississippi	5,364
none		none		Sharkey County, Mississippi	3,097
none		none		Issaquena County, Mississippi	1,263
State of Mississippi					2,954,160

The 21 core-based statistical areas of the State of Mississippi (Note: For CBSAs comprising populations from multiple states, they are listed twice to show both their intrastate population within that CBSA as well as the CBSA's total population. Only the intrastate population is ranked.)
2025 rank	Core-based statistical area	Population				
2025 rank	Core-based statistical area	2025 estimate	Change	2020 Census	Change	2010 Census
1	Jackson, MS MSA	609,847	−1.63%	619,968	+0.88%	614,584
2	Gulfport-Biloxi, MS MSA	431,329	+3.62%	416,259	+7.15%	388,488
3	Memphis, TN-MS-AR MSA (MS)	277,618	+4.94%	264,558	+7.20%	246,789
4	Hattiesburg, MS MSA	158,014	+2.68%	153,891	+7.74%	142,842
5	Tupelo, MS μSA	139,979	+5.87%	132,214	+0.48%	131,587
6	Meridian, MS μSA	85,419	−3.59%	88,599	−8.65%	96,993
7	Laurel, MS μSA	82,281	−1.59%	83,613	−1.43%	84,823
8	Oxford, MS μSA	71,972	+5.39%	68,294	+13.77%	60,029
9	Columbus, MS μSA	67,144	−2.92%	69,164	−3.03%	71,324
10	Starkville, MS μSA	62,063	+0.57%	61,714	+6.54%	57,924
11	Picayune, MS μSA	59,363	+5.73%	56,145	+0.56%	55,834
12	McComb, MS μSA	52,640	−2.89%	54,208	−2.93%	55,847
13	Vicksburg, MS μSA	41,759	−6.63%	44,722	−8.31%	48,773
14	Greenville, MS μSA	40,446	−9.96%	44,922	−12.15%	51,137
15	Greenwood, MS μSA	34,912	−8.93%	38,337	−10.67%	42,914
16	Natchez, MS-LA μSA (MS)	36,886	+0.24%	36,798	−8.06%	40,023
17	Brookhaven, MS μSA	35,012	+0.30%	34,907	+0.11%	34,869
18	Corinth, MS μSA	34,569	−0.49%	34,740	−6.25%	37,057
19	Grenada, MS μSA	30,222	−3.91%	31,451	−4.20%	32,831
20	Cleveland, MS μSA	28,262	−8.79%	30,985	−9.25%	34,145
21	Clarksdale, MS μSA	19,849	−7.20%	21,390	−18.21%	26,151
	Memphis, TN-MS-AR MSA	1,341,412	−0.30%	1,345,425	+1.55%	1,324,829
	Natchez, MS-LA μSA	54,722	−1.38%	55,485	−8.81%	60,845

The six combined statistical areas of the State of Mississippi (Note: For CSAs comprising populations from multiple states, they are listed twice to show both their intrastate population within that CSA as well as the CSA's total population. Only the intrastate population is ranked.)
2025 rank	Combined statistical area	Population				
2025 rank	Combined statistical area	2025 estimate	Change	2020 Census	Change	2010 Census
1	Jackson-Vicksburg-Brookhaven, MS CSA	686,618	−1.86%	699,597	+0.20%	698,226
2	Memphis-Forrest City, TN-MS-AR CSA (MS)	297,467	+4.03%	285,948	+4.77%	272,940
3	Hattiesburg-Laurel, MS CSA	240,295	+1.18%	237,504	+4.32%	227,665
4	Tupelo-Corinth, MS CSA	174,548	+4.55%	166,954	−1.00%	168,644
5	Starkville-Columbus, MS CSA	129,207	−1.28%	130,878	+1.26%	129,248
6	New Orleans-Metairie-Slidell, LA-MS CSA (MS)	59,363	+5.73%	56,145	+0.56%	55,834
	Memphis-Forrest City, TN-MS-AR CSA	1,383,061	−0.49%	1,389,905	+0.77%	1,379,238
	New Orleans-Metairie-Slidell, LA-MS CSA	1,354,257	−1.40%	1,373,453	+6.23%	1,292,868

== See also ==
- Geography of Mississippi
  - Demographics of Mississippi
