= Plantersville =

Plantersville may refer to:

- Plantersville, Alabama, an unincorporated community
- Plantersville, Mississippi, a town
- Plantersville, South Carolina, an unincorporated community
- Plantersville, Texas, an unincorporated community
