= McComb micropolitan area =

Micropolitan area in Mississippi, U.S.

McComb, Mississippi Area
- Micropolitan Statistical Area
- McComb, MS Micropolitan Statistical Area
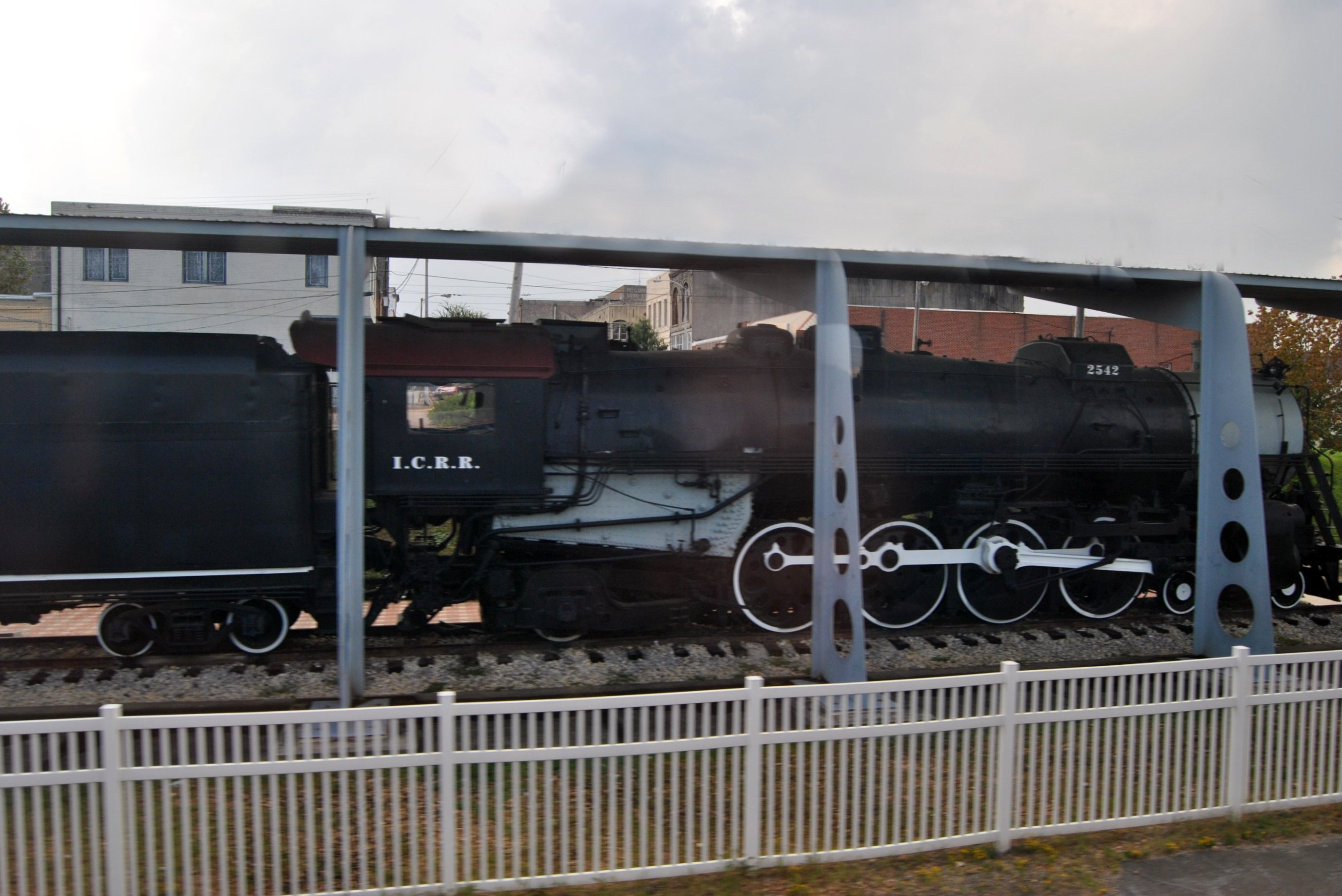
- A Steam Locomotive on Display in McComb
Interactive Map of McComb, MS μSA
City of McComb
McComb, MS μSA
- Country: United States
- State: Mississippi
- Principal city: McComb
- Time zone: UTC-6 (CST)
  - Summer (DST): UTC-5 (CDT)

The McComb Micropolitan Statistical Area is a micropolitan area in southwestern Mississippi that includes Pike, Walthall, and Amite counties which had a combined population of 66,024 as of the 2020 census.

== Counties ==
- Pike
- Walthall
- Amite

== Communities ==
=== Incorporated places ===
- Magnolia
- McComb (Principal City)
- Osyka
- Summit
- Tylertown
- Liberty

=== Unincorporated places ===
- Chatawa
- Fernwood
- Pricedale

== Demographics ==
As of the census of 2000, there were 52,539 people, 20,063 households, and 14,381 families residing within the μSA. The racial makeup was 52.59% White, 46.26% African American, 0.17% Native American, 0.26% Asian, 0.01% Pacific Islander, 0.20% from other races, and 0.50% from two or more races. Hispanic or Latino of any race were 0.76% of the population.

The median income for a household in the μSA was $25,298, and the median income for a family was $30,336. Males had a median income of $27,878 versus $16,789 for females. The per capita income for the μSA was $14,044.

== See also ==
- List of metropolitan areas in Mississippi
- List of micropolitan areas in Mississippi
- List of cities in Mississippi
- List of towns and villages in Mississippi
- List of census-designated places in Mississippi
- List of United States metropolitan areas
