= List of micropolitan areas in Mississippi =

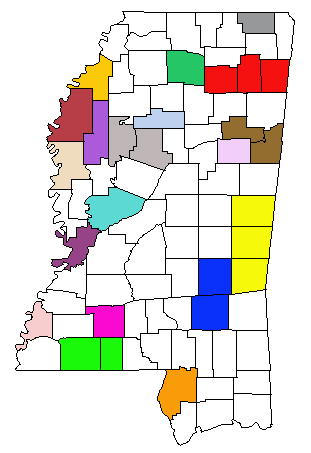
Micropolitan areas of Mississippi.

The State of Mississippi has a total of twenty micropolitan areas that are fully or partially located in the state. 27 of the state's 82 counties are considered by the United States Census Bureau as micropolitan. As of the 2000 Census, these counties had a combined population of 1,001,735 (35.2% of the state's total population). Based on a July 1, 2008 population estimate, that figure had declined to 998,992 (33.8% of the state's total population).

== Micropolitan areas ==
- Brookhaven μSA^{3}
  - Lincoln County
- Clarksdale μSA
  - Coahoma County
- Cleveland μSA
  - Bolivar County
- Columbus μSA^{1}
  - Lowndes County
- Corinth μSA
  - Alcorn County
  - McNairy County, TN
- Greenville μSA
  - Washington County
- Greenwood μSA
  - Carroll County
  - Leflore County
- Lexington-Kosciusko μSA
- Grenada μSA
  - Grenada County
- Indianola μSA
  - Sunflower County
- Laurel μSA
  - Jasper County
  - Jones County
- McComb μSA
  - Amite County
  - Pike County
- Meridian μSA
  - Clarke County
  - Kemper County
  - Lauderdale County
- Natchez μSA
  - Adams County
  - Concordia Parish, LA
- Oxford μSA
  - Lafayette County
- Picayune μSA^{2}
  - Pearl River County
- Starkville μSA^{1}
  - Oktibbeha County
- Tupelo μSA
  - Itawamba County
  - Lee County
  - Pontotoc County
- Vicksburg μSA^{3}
  - Warren County
  - Claiborne County
- West Point μSA^{1}
  - Clay County
- Yazoo City μSA^{3}
  - Yazoo County

^{1} - part of the Columbus-Starkville-West Point combined statistical area
^{2} - part of the New Orleans–Metairie–Hammond combined statistical area
^{3} - part of the Jackson-Yazoo City combined statistical area

=== Population statistics ===
Micropolitan Statistical Area	July 1, 2009 Estimate	2000 Census	Growth Rate (2000–2009)
Brookhaven	34,234	33,166	5.02%
Clarksdale	26,936	30,622	-12.04%
Cleveland	36,766	40,633	-9.52%
Columbus	59,658	61,586	-3.13%
Corinth	35,822	34,558	3.66%
Greenville	54,616	62,977	-13.28%
Greenwood	44,841	48,716	-7.95%
Grenada	23,046	23,263	-0.93%
Indianola	29,610	34,369	-13.85%
Laurel	85,716	83,107	3.14%
McComb	234,568	210,875	9.58%
Meridian	106,139	106,569	-0.40%
Natchez	49,711	54,587	-8.93%
Oxford	43,975	38,744	13.50%
Picayune	57,860	48,621	19.00%
Starkville	44,544	42,902	3.83%
Tupelo	134,161	125,251	7.11%
Vicksburg	48,175	49,644	-2.96%
West Point	20,722	21,979	-5.72%
Yazoo City	27,981	28,149	-0.60%

== See also ==
- List of metropolitan areas in Mississippi
- List of cities in Mississippi
- List of towns and villages in Mississippi
- Mississippi census statistical areas
- Table of United States primary census statistical areas (PCSA)
- Table of United States Combined Statistical Areas (CSA)
- Table of United States Metropolitan Statistical Areas (MSA)
- Table of United States Micropolitan Statistical Areas (μSA)
