= Tupelo micropolitan area =

Coordinates: 34.257351°N 88.715644°W

Tupelo, Mississippi Area
- Micropolitan Statistical Area
- Tupelo, MS Micropolitan Statistical Area
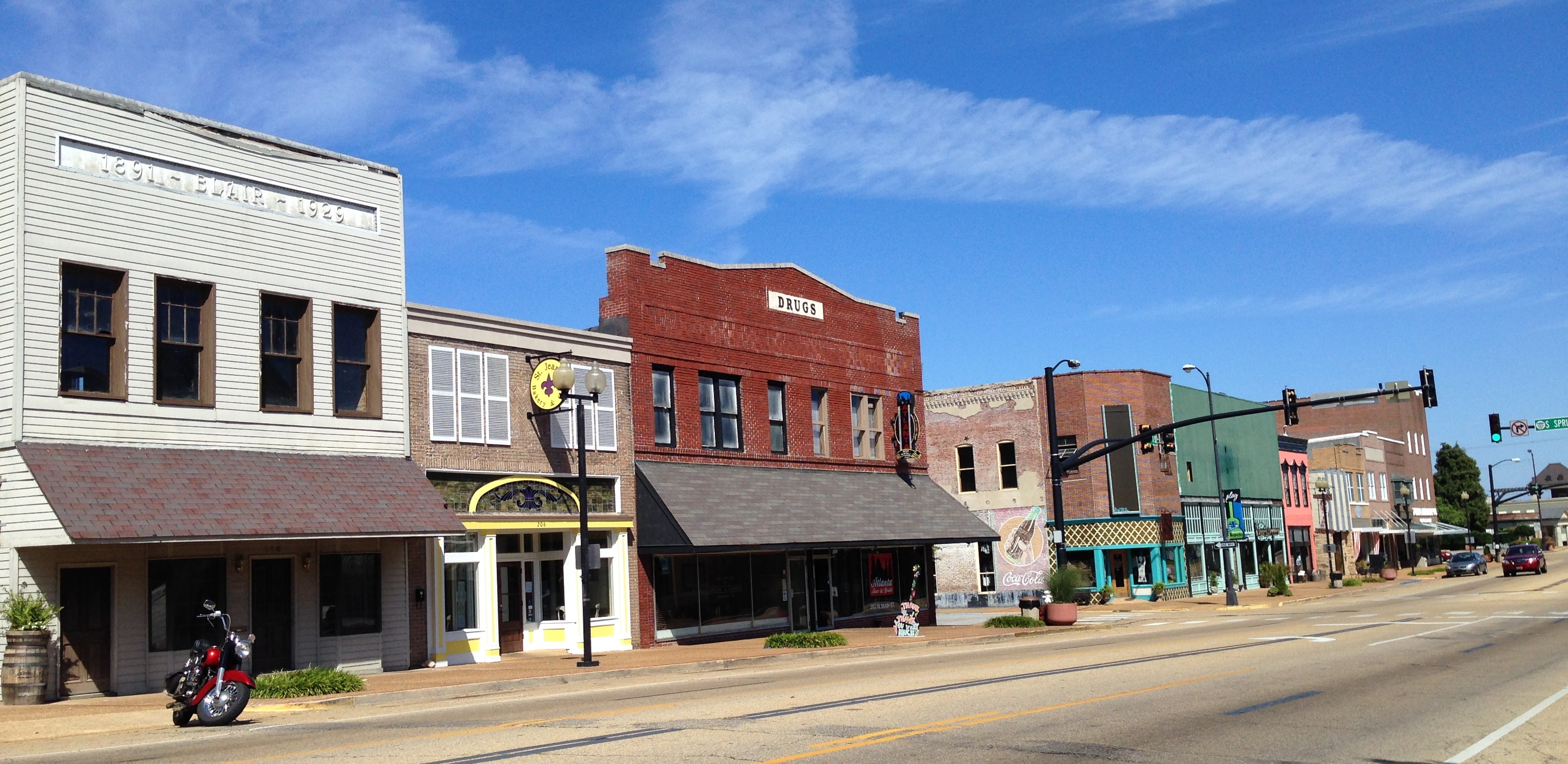
- Main Street in Tupelo
Interactive Map of Tupelo–Corinth, MS CSA
City of Tupelo
Tupelo, MS µSA
City of Corinth
Corinth, MS µSA
- Country: United States
- State: Mississippi
- Principal city: Tupelo
- Other cities: Booneville; Fulton; Corinth

Area
  - Total: 1,494 sq mi (3,870 km^{2})
  - Land: 1,479 sq mi (3,830 km^{2})
  - Water: 16 sq mi (41 km^{2})
  - Density: 5/sq mi (1.9/km^{2})
- Time zone: UTC-6 (CST)
  - Summer (DST): UTC-5 (CDT)
- Area code: 662

The Tupelo Micropolitan Statistical Area is a micropolitan area in northeastern Mississippi that covers three counties—Itawamba, Lee and Pontotoc. As of the 2000 census, the area had a population of 125,251. The population at the 2020 Census was 138,390.

== Counties ==
- Itawamba
- Lee
- Pontotoc

== Communities ==
=== Cities ===
- Baldwyn (partial)
- Fulton
- Pontotoc
- Saltillo
- Tupelo (Principal City)
- Verona

=== Towns ===
- Algoma
- Ecru
- Guntown
- Mantachie
- Nettleton (partial)
- Plantersville
- Shannon
- Sherman (partial)
- Thaxton
- Toccopola
- Tremont

=== Unincorporated places ===
- Dorsey
- Eggville
- Fairview
- Mooreville
- Randolph
- Springville
- Troy

== Demographics ==
As of the census of 2000, there were 125,251 people, 48,070 households, and 34,881 families residing within the μSA. The racial makeup of the μSA was 79.37% White, 18.98% African American, 0.16% Native American, 0.37% Asian, 0.01% Pacific Islander, 0.47% from other races, and 0.64% from two or more races. Hispanic or Latino of any race were 1.27% of the population.

The median income for a household in the μSA was $33,125, and the median income for a family was $39,929. Males had a median income of $29,781 versus $21,495 for females. The per capita income for the μSA was $16,523.

== See also ==
- List of metropolitan areas in Mississippi
- List of micropolitan areas in Mississippi
- List of cities in Mississippi
- List of towns and villages in Mississippi
- List of census-designated places in Mississippi
- List of United States metropolitan areas
