= Jackson–Vicksburg–Brookhaven combined statistical area =

Jackson–Vicksburg–Brookhaven
- Combined Statistical Area
- Jackson–Vicksburg–Brookhaven, MS; Combined Statistical Area
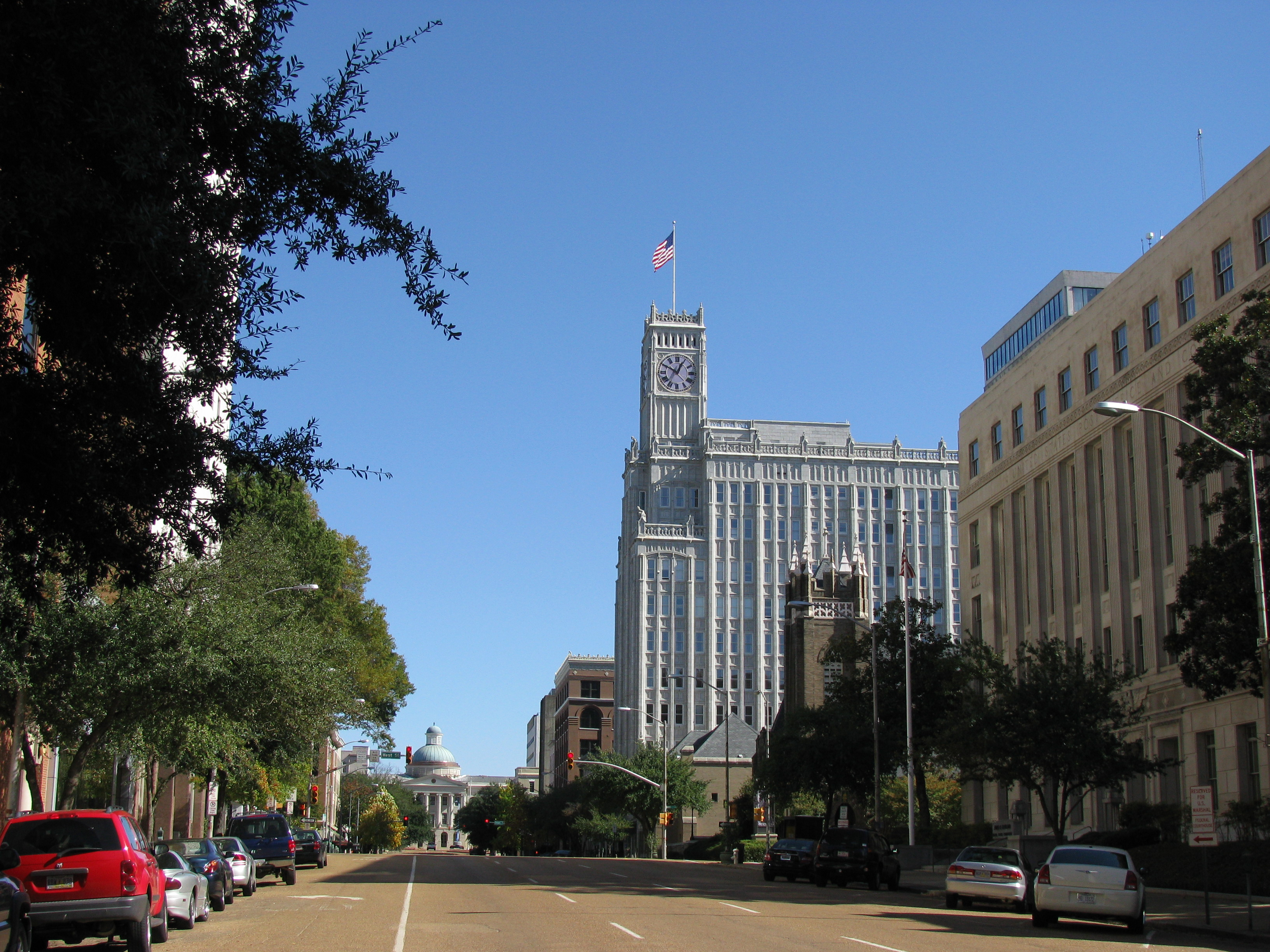
- Capitol Street in Jackson
Map of Jackson–Vicksburg–Brookhaven, MS CSA
City of Jackson
Jackson, MS MSA
City of Vicksburg
Vicksburg, MS µSA
City of Brookhaven
Brookhaven, MS µSA
- Country: United States
- State: Mississippi
- Largest city: Jackson (153,701)
- Other cities: Clinton (28,100); Madison (27,747); Pearl (27,115); Brandon (25,138); Ridgeland (24,340); Yazoo City (10,316); Vicksburg (20,391); Brookhaven (11,674)

Population (2020)
  - Total: 597,727
  - Density: 5/sq mi (1.9/km^{2})

GDP
  - Jackson, MS MSA: $34.043 billion (2022)
- Time zone: UTC-6 (CST)
  - Summer (DST): UTC-5 (CDT)

The Jackson–Vicksburg–Brookhaven, MS Combined Statistical Area is made up of eight counties in central Mississippi and consists of the Jackson Metropolitan Statistical Area, the Brookhaven, MS Micropolitan Statistical Area, the Vicksburg micropolitan area, and the Yazoo City Micropolitan Statistical Area. The 2010 census placed the Jackson–Vicksburg–Brookhaven CSA population at 650,764, although as of 2019, it's estimated to have increased to 666,318.

== Counties ==
- Copiah
- Hinds
- Madison
- Rankin
- Simpson
- Yazoo
- Warren
- Claiborne
- Lincoln

== Communities ==
=== Places with more than 25,000 inhabitants ===
- Jackson (Principal City)
- Brandon
- Clinton
- Madison
- Pearl

=== Places with 10,000 to 25,000 inhabitants ===
- Brookhaven (Principal City)
- Byram
- Canton
- Flowood
- Ridgeland
- Vicksburg (Principal City)
- Yazoo City (Principal City)

=== Places with 1,000 to 10,000 inhabitants ===
- Crystal Springs
- Edwards
- Flora
- Florence
- Gluckstadt
- Hazlehurst
- Magee
- Mendenhall
- Pelahatchie
- Raymond
- Richland
- Terry
- Wesson

=== Places with less than 1,000 inhabitants ===
- Beauregard
- Bentonia
- Bolton
- Braxton
- D'Lo
- Eden
- Georgetown
- Learned
- Puckett
- Satartia
- Utica

=== Unincorporated places ===
- Anding
- Benton
- Brownsville
- Camden
- Carpenter
- Dentville
- Fannin
- Gallman
- Goshen Springs
- Gulde
- Harrisville
- Holly Bluff
- Hopewell
- Johns
- Langford
- Leesburg
- Martinsville
- Oakley
- Piney Woods
- Pinola
- Pocahontas
- Sandhill
- Sharon
- Star
- Tinsley
- Vaughan
- Whitfield

== Demographics ==
As of the census of 2000, there were 525,346 people, 189,734 households, and 134,348 families residing within the CSA. The racial makeup of the CSA was 52.57% White, 45.75% African American, 0.13% Native American, 0.65% Asian, 0.01% Pacific Islander, 0.28% from other races, and 0.59% from two or more races. Hispanic or Latino of any race were 1.17% of the population.

The median income for a household in the CSA was $34,234, and the median income for a family was $40,613. Males had a median income of $32,167 versus $23,316 for females. The per capita income for the CSA was $16,580.

== See also ==
- Mississippi census statistical areas
- List of metropolitan areas in Mississippi
- List of micropolitan areas in Mississippi
- List of cities in Mississippi
- List of towns and villages in Mississippi
- List of census-designated places in Mississippi
- List of United States metropolitan areas
