= Pricedale, Mississippi =

Unincorporated community in Mississippi, US

- Unincorporated community
- Location within Mississippi Location within the United States
- Coordinates: 31°17′26″N 90°17′41″W
- Country: United States
- State: Mississippi
- County: Pike
- Elevation: 335 ft (102 m)
- Time zone: UTC-6 (Central (CST))
  - Summer (DST): UTC-5 (CDT)
- ZIP code: 39666
- Area code: 601
- GNIS feature ID: 676336

Pricedale is an unincorporated community located in Pike County, Mississippi, United States. Pricedale is approximately 6.4 miles (10.3 km) north of Gloster on Mississippi Highway 44 and a part of the McComb, Mississippi Micropolitan Statistical Area. A post office operated under the name Pricedale from 1935 to 1955.
