= Carnes, Mississippi =

- Unincorporated community
- Location within the state of Mississippi
- Coordinates: 30°59′37″N 89°15′35″W
- Country: United States
- State: Mississippi
- County: Forrest
- Time zone: UTC-6 (Central (CST))
  - Summer (DST): UTC-5 (CDT)

Carnes is a small unincorporated community in southern Forrest County, Mississippi. It is part of the Hattiesburg, Mississippi Metropolitan Statistical Area.

== History ==
Carnes was settled in 1905 and was originally named Helena. Its name was changed to Carnes in honor of John Carnes, an early settler. Carnes is located on the former Gulf and Ship Island Railroad and was once home to two pine lumber mills and the Red Creek Lumber Company.

A post office operated under the name Carnes from 1905 to 1934.

== Geography ==
Carnes is located at latitude 30.9935178, longitude -89.2597811.

== Education ==
Carnes is served by the Forrest County Public School System.

- Forrest County Agricultural High School
- South Forrest Attendance Center

== Industry ==
- Florida Gas Transmission Company - transports natural gas to over 240 delivery points through a 5,000-mile pipeline that extends from Texas to Florida

== Places of worship ==
- Sandhill Baptist Church
- First Baptist Church

== Cemeteries ==
- J.E. Bounds Memorial Cemetery
- Lee-Davis Cemetery
- Seal Cemetery
