= Hattiesburg–Laurel combined statistical area =

Coordinates: 31.482263°N 89.249588°W

Hattiesburg–Laurel, Mississippi Area
- Combined Statistical Area
- Hattiesburg–Laurel, MS; Combined Statistical Area
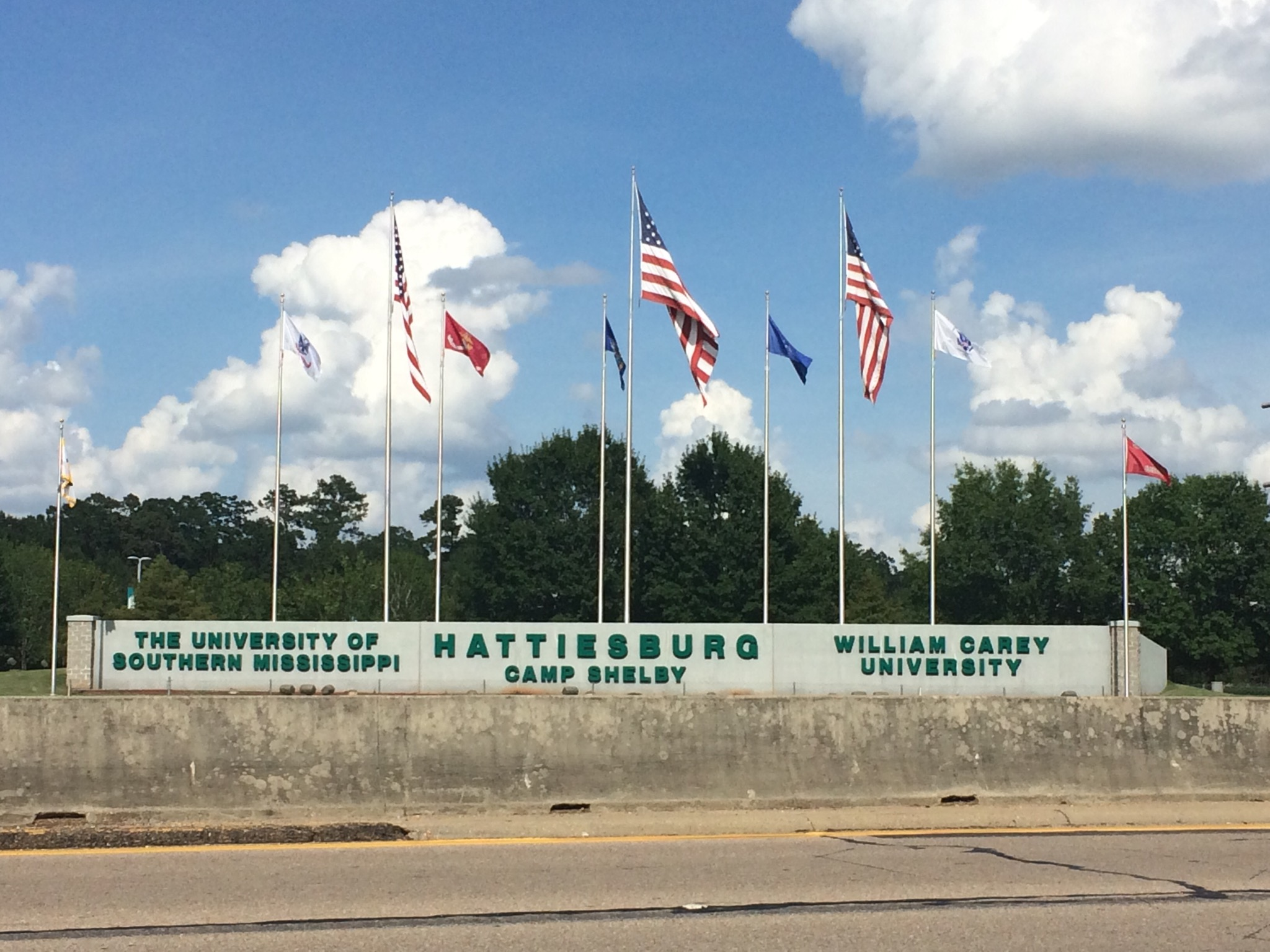
Interactive Map of Hattiesburg–Laurel, MS CSA
City of Hattiesburg
Hattiesburg, MS MSA
City of Laurel
Laurel, MS µSA
- Country: United States
- State: Mississippi
- Principal city: Hattiesburg
- Other city: Laurel
- Time zone: UTC-6 (CST)
  - Summer (DST): UTC-5 (CDT)

The Hattiesburg–Laurel combined statistical area is a combined statistical area (CSA) in southern Mississippi that covers six counties: Covington, Forrest, Jasper, Jones, Lamar, and Perry. The CSA consists of the Hattiesburg Metropolitan Statistical Area and the Laurel Micropolitan Statistical Area. The 2010 census placed the Hattiesburg-Laurel CSA population at 247,233, though as of 2019, it was estimated to have increased to 253,330.
