= Laurel micropolitan area =

Coordinates: 31.709021°N 89.136157°W

Laurel, Mississippi Area
- Micropolitan Statistical Area
- Laurel, MS Micropolitan Statistical Area
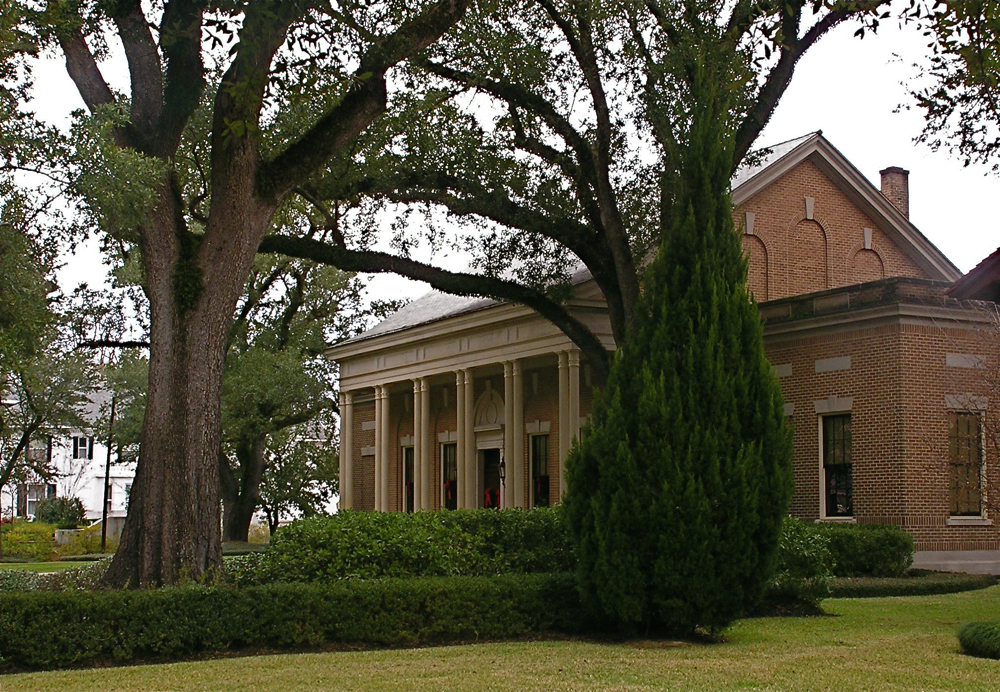
- Lauren Rogers Museum of Art
Interactive Map of Hattiesburg–Laurel, MS CSA
City of Hattiesburg
Hattiesburg, MS MSA
City of Laurel
Laurel, MS µSA
- Country: United States
- State: Mississippi
- Principal city: Laurel

Area
  - Total: 1,377 sq mi (3,570 km^{2})
  - Land: 1,370 sq mi (3,500 km^{2})
  - Water: 7 sq mi (18 km^{2})

Population (2009)
  - Total: 85,716
  - Density: 61.9/sq mi (23.9/km^{2})
- Time zone: UTC-6 (CST)
  - Summer (DST): UTC-5 (CDT)

The Laurel Micropolitan Statistical Area is a micropolitan statistical area (μSA) in southeastern Mississippi that covers two counties - Jasper and Jones. The 2010 census placed the Laurel micropolitan area population at 84,823, though as of 2019, estimates indicate the population has slightly decreased to 84,481.

== Counties ==
- Jasper
- Jones

== Communities ==
=== Incorporated places ===
- Bay Springs
- Ellisville
- Heidelberg
- Laurel (Principal City)
- Louin
- Montrose
- Sandersville
- Soso

=== Unincorporated places ===
- Eastabuchie
- Garlandville
- Moselle
- Moss
- Ovett
- Paulding
- Rose Hill
- Sharon
- Stringer
- Vossburg

== Demographics ==
As of the census of 2000, there were 83,107 people, 30,983 households, and 22,507 families residing within this portion of the USA. The racial makeup of the area was 65.73% White, 32.13% African American, 0.32% Native American, 0.22% Asian, 0.01% Pacific Islander, 1.12% from other races, and 0.47% from two or more races. Hispanic or Latino of any race were 1.67% of the population.

The median income for a household in this area of the USA was $26,614, and the median income for a family was $32,208. Males had a median income of $27,728 versus $18,333 for females. The per capita income for the area was $13,855.

== See also ==
- List of metropolitan areas in Mississippi
- List of micropolitan areas in Mississippi
- List of cities in Mississippi
- List of towns and villages in Mississippi
- List of census-designated places in Mississippi
- List of United States metropolitan areas
