= Uptown McComb =

- Location: McComb, Mississippi, United States
- Coordinates: 31.26277°N 90.47646°W
- Address: 1722 Veterans Blvd
- Opened: July 1987
- Developer: Carl Haskins and Prescott Sherman
- Owner: RockStep Capital
- Num. of stores: 45
- Num. of anchor tenants: 8
- Floor area: 342,220 square feet (31,793 m^{2})
- Floors: 1
- Parking: 1,900
- Website: uptownmccomb.com

Uptown McComb (formerly Edgewood Mall) is an enclosed shopping mall located in McComb, Mississippi, United States. The mall is situated at the intersection of Interstate 55 and Veterans Boulevard. The anchor stores are Belk, Ashley HomeStore, Hobby Lobby, Marshalls, Five Below, Ross Dress for Less, Aldi, and Shoe Dept. Encore. The mall currently has over 40 stores and services. Walmart is located next door and Lowe's is located across the boulevard. The mall’s surrounding businesses include Chick-fil-A, McDonald's, First Bank, McComb Urgent Care, Burger King, The Juicy Seafood, Pike National Bank, Marathon, Walgreens, Holiday Inn Express, and Khalaf Plaza. On the other side of I-55 is a B-Kwik Chevron/Mr. Whiskers Fish & Grill, Arby's, Hampton Inn & Suites, Comfort Inn & Suites, Deerfield Inn, El Dorado Mexican Bar & Grill, Keith White Ford-Lincoln, and more.

== History ==
Uptown McComb, the first and only enclosed shopping mall in McComb, was built in 1987 by Prescott Sherman. Anchored by JCPenney, Beall-Ladymon, and Walmart, the mall opened its doors as Edgewood Mall in July 1987 with a total of 236,324 square feet (21,955 m^{2}) of retail space. The mall was built on land owned by the Sherman family.

In 1994, the Beall-Ladymon chain was bought out and converted to a Stage in early 1995. Walmart relocated next door as a Supercenter in 1998, and Sears replaced the former Walmart anchor in March 1999. A major overhaul of the mall in 1999 included a 15,466 square feet (1,437 m^{2}) expansion of the JCPenney anchor, construction of an additional 25,000 square feet (2,300 m^{2}) of space for specialty shops, and addition of fourth large (71,798 square feet (6,670 m^{2})) anchor, Mississippi-based McRae's. This expansion, capped by a grand re-opening in September 1999, left the mall with over 400,000 square feet (37,000 m^{2}) of retail space.

In 2002, Mississippi Business Journal reported that Prescott Sherman had given $2 million to the School of Engineering at the University of Mississippi from Edgewood Mall. Ashley Furniture HomeStore opened in late 2007, and Stage was converted to Goody’s in September 2011. Sears closed in 2012. Hobby Lobby took one half of the former Sears anchor in 2015. Marshalls took the other half of the former Sears anchor in 2016. Edgewood Mall was sold to RockStep Capital in 2017. In 2019, Stage Stores announced that it would convert all of its stores to Gordmans, including the Goody's at Edgewood Mall. This conversion was to supposed to take place in 2020, but never happened. Shoe Dept. Encore has since moved into the former Goody's anchor. JCPenney closed in July 2019. Edgewood Mall was renamed Uptown McComb in July 2020. Ross Dress for Less took one half of the former JCPenney anchor in 2022. Aldi took the other half of the former JCPenney anchor in January 2023. Five Below opened in July 2023 next to Marshalls.

== Anchors ==
- Belk - opened as McRae's in 1999, converted to Belk in March 2006.
- Ashley HomeStore - opened in late 2007, sold to Lott Furniture Company in September 2008, operated by Pennebaker Enterprises of Hattiesburg, Inc. since July 2014.
- Hobby Lobby - opened in one half of the former Sears in 2015.
- Marshalls - opened in the other half of the former Sears in 2016. Opened as Walmart, which relocated next door as a Supercenter in 1998. Reopened as Sears in March 1999, which closed in 2012.
- Ross Dress for Less - opened in one half of the former JCPenney in 2022.
- Aldi - opened in the other half of the former JCPenney in January 2023. Original tenant was JCPenney, which closed in July 2019.
- Five Below - opened in July 2023 next to Marshalls.
- Shoe Dept. Encore - opened as Beall-Ladymon. The Beall-Ladymon chain was bought out in 1994, which resulted in the mall’s Beall-Ladymon location being converted to Stage in early 1995. Stage was later converted to Goody's in September 2011. Goody’s was to be converted to Gordmans in 2020, but this conversion never happened.

== Other stores ==
Other notable stores include Foot Locker, Hibbett Sports, Rue21, Factory Connection, and a nail salon. A KB Toys, which opened during the mall's 1999 expansion, was closed due to the toy chain's bankruptcy in 2004. The mall's Kirkland's location closed in 2005.

== Former features ==
=== Mississippi Driver's License Office ===
The Mississippi Highway Patrol's driver's license office relocated from the Magnolia Community Center in nearby Magnolia to Edgewood Mall in 2001. Opening its doors on September 4, 2001, this office was located at the north entrance of the mall between JCPenney and McRae's. In February 2007, the Mississippi Department of Public Safety announced that the office was being forced to relocate by the end of March 2007 because their space in the mall had been acquired by another party.
