= Hintonville, Mississippi =

Hintonville
- Unincorporated community
- Location within Mississippi Location within the United States
- Coordinates: 31°15′40″N 88°55′19″W
- Country: United States
- State: Mississippi
- County: Perry
- Elevation: 167 ft (51 m)
- Time zone: UTC-6 (Central (CST))
  - Summer (DST): UTC-5 (CDT)
- ZIP code: 39476
- Area code: 601
- GNIS feature ID: 691935

Hintonville is an unincorporated community located in Perry County, Mississippi, United States. Hintonville is approximately 3 miles (4.8 km) north of Beaumont on Mississippi Highway 15 and a part of the Hattiesburg, Mississippi Metropolitan Statistical Area. Hintonville was named in the late 1800s in honor of Arthur "Manny" Hinton, a local pastor, Husband of Corinne Bush, and father of 25 (born between two (2) wives). Pastor Hinton was the irect descendant of two brothers who were separated and then sold during slavery: One permitted to retain the family name, "McSwain", the other given the name of the other master, "Hinton"

== History ==
Hintonville is located on the former Gulf, Mobile and Ohio Railroad. Hintonville was formerly home to a train station. A school was in operation for the community at one point prior to closing. A post office operated under the name Hintonville from 1902 to 1914.
