= List of metropolitan areas in Mississippi =

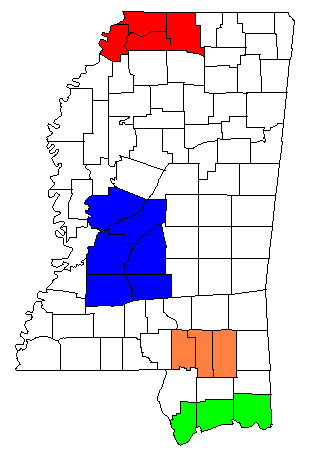
Metropolitan areas of Mississippi. Jackson MSA Gulfport-Biloxi MSA Hattiesburg MSA Memphis MSA

The State of Mississippi has a total of four metropolitan statistical areas (MSAs) that are fully or partially located in the state. 17 of the state's 82 counties are classified by the United States Census Bureau as metropolitan. As of the 2000 census, these counties had a combined population of 1,194,522 (42.0% of the state's total population). Based on a July 1, 2009 population estimate, that figure rose to 1,311,726 (44.4% of the state's total population).

== Metropolitan areas ==
- Gulfport-Biloxi MSA
- Hattiesburg MSA
- Jackson MSA
- Memphis, TN-AR-MS MSA (Partial)

=== Population statistics ===
Metropolitan Statistical Area	July 1, 2009 Estimate	2000 Census	Growth Rate (2000–2009)
Jackson MSA	540,866	497,197	8.78%
Gulfport-Biloxi MSA^{1}	238,772	246,190	–3.01%
Memphis, TN-AR-MS MSA^{2}	233,392	176,789	32.02%
Pascagoula MSA^{1} ^{3}	155,603	150,564	3.35%
Hattiesburg MSA	143,093	123,812	15.57%
^{1} The Gulfport-Biloxi and Pascagoula metropolitan areas were significantly impacted by Hurricane Katrina in 2005. Prior to the hurricane, both areas had experienced steady to moderate population growth.^{2} Population figures only reflect the Mississippi portion (four counties) of the Memphis TN-AR-MS metro area.^{3} As of 2020, this area is no longer designated as a metropolitan statistical area. Jackson County is part of the Gulfport–Biloxi metropolitan area, and George County is not included in any metropolitan or micropolitan statistical area.

== Combined Statistical Areas ==
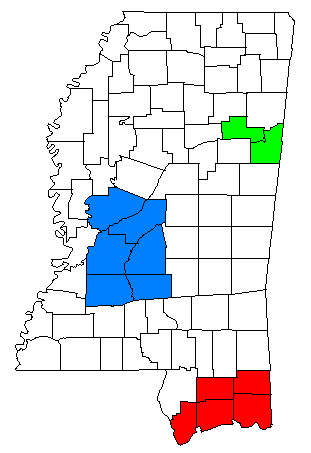
Combined statistical areas of Mississippi. Jackson-Yazoo City CSA Columbus-West Point CSA Gulfport-Biloxi-Pascagoula CSA

The United States Census Bureau defines a Combined Statistical Area (CSA) as an aggregate of adjacent Core Based Statistical Areas (CBSAs) that are linked by commuting ties. There are three combined statistical areas in Mississippi.

- Jackson–Vicksburg–Brookhaven CSA
  - Jackson Metropolitan Statistical Area
  - Vicksburg Micropolitan Statistical Area
  - Brookhaven Micropolitan Statistical Area
- Memphis–Clarksdale–Forrest City, TN-MS-AR CSA (Partial)
  - Memphis, TN-MS-AR MSA
  - Forrest City, AR μSA
  - Clarksdale, MS μSA
- Hattiesburg–Laurel, MS CSA
  - Hattiesburg Metropolitan Statistical Area
  - Laurel Micropolitan Statistical Area
- Tupelo–Corinth, MS CSA
  - Tupelo, MS μSA
  - Corinth, MS μSA
- Starkville–Columbus CSA
  - Columbus Micropolitan Statistical Area
  - Starkville Micropolitan Statistical Area
- Cleveland–Indianola, MS CSA
  - Cleveland Micropolitan Statistical Area
  - Indianola Micropolitan Statistical Area
- New Orleans–Metairie–Slidell, LA-MS CSA (Partial)
  - New Orleans–Metairie, LA MSA
  - Slidell–Mandeville–Covington, LA MSA
  - Picayune, MS μSA
  - Bogalusa, LA μSA

== See also ==
- List of micropolitan areas in Mississippi
- List of cities in Mississippi
- List of towns and villages in Mississippi
- Mississippi census statistical areas
- Table of United States primary census statistical areas (PCSA)
- Table of United States Combined Statistical Areas (CSA)
- Table of United States Metropolitan Statistical Areas (MSA)
- Table of United States Micropolitan Statistical Areas (μSA)
