= Lee County School District (Mississippi) =

School district in Mississippi

Address
- 1280 College View Drive Tupelo, Mississippi, 38804; United States
- Coordinates: 34.240294°N 88.679957°W

District information
- Type: Public
- Grades: PreK–12
- NCES District ID: 2802550

Students and staff
- Students: 6,389
- Teachers: 464.07
- Staff: 486.13
- Student–teacher ratio: 13.77

Other information
- Website: www.leecountyschools.us

The Lee County School District is a public school district based in Lee County, Mississippi (USA).

The district serves the towns of: Guntown, Plantersville, Shannon, and Verona, as well as almost all of Saltillo, the community of Mooreville, and the Lee County portion of Sherman. It also includes small portions of Tupelo.

The headquarters of the district is in Tupelo.

== Schools ==
=== High schools ===
- Mooreville High School
- Saltillo High School
- Shannon High School

=== Middle schools ===
- Guntown Middle School
- Mooreville Middle School
- Shannon Middle School
- Plantersville Middle School

=== Elementary schools ===
- Mooreville Elementary School
- Saltillo Elementary School
- Shannon Elementary School
- Verona Elementary School
- Saltillo Primary School
- Shannon Primary School

== Demographics ==
=== 2006-07 school year ===
There were a total of 6,702 students enrolled in the Lee County School District during the 2006–2007 school year. The gender makeup of the district was 49% female and 51% male. The racial makeup of the district was 28.53% African American, 69.93% White, 1.09% Hispanic, 0.43% Asian, and 0.01% Native American. 44.4% of the district's students were eligible to receive free lunch.

=== Previous school years ===
School Year	Enrollment	Gender Makeup		Racial Makeup				
School Year	Enrollment	Female	Male	Asian	African American	Hispanic	Native American	White
2005-06	6,564	48%	52%	0.34%	28.23%	0.94%	0.02%	70.48%
2004-05	6,399	49%	51%	0.30%	28.74%	0.77%	–	70.20%
2003-04	6,245	49%	51%	0.30%	29.22%	0.78%	–	69.69%
2002-03	6,241	48%	52%	0.26%	29.93%	0.64%	–	69.17%

== Accountability statistics ==
	2006-07	2005-06	2004-05	2003-04	2002-03
District Accreditation Status	Accredited	Accredited	Accredited	Accredited	Accredited
School Performance Classifications
Level 5 (Superior Performing) Schools	3	2	1	2	2
Level 4 (Exemplary) Schools	4	4	4	3	3
Level 3 (Successful) Schools	2	3	3	4	3
Level 2 (Under Performing) Schools	1	1	1	0	1
Level 1 (Low Performing) Schools	0	0	0	0	0
Not Assigned	2	2	2	0	0

== See also ==
- List of school districts in Mississippi
