= Plantersville, Mississippi =

- Town
- Location of Plantersville, Mississippi

- Location in the United States
- Coordinates: 34°12′42″N 88°39′49″W
- Country: United States
- State: Mississippi
- County: Lee

Government
  - Mayor: Shelton Shannon

Area
  - Total: 2.10 sq mi (5.44 km^{2})
  - Land: 2.09 sq mi (5.42 km^{2})
  - Water: 0.0077 sq mi (0.02 km^{2})
- Elevation: 308 ft (94 m)

Population (2020)
  - Total: 868
  - Density: 414.8/sq mi (160.14/km^{2})
- Time zone: UTC-6 (Central (CST))
  - Summer (DST): UTC-5 (CDT)
- ZIP code: 38862
- Area code: 662
- FIPS code: 28-58440
- GNIS feature ID: 0675959
- Website: plantersvillems.gov

Plantersville is a town in Lee County, Mississippi. The population was 868 at the 2020 census.

== Geography ==
Plantersville is located at 34°12′42″N 88°39′49″W (34.211530, -88.663681).

According to the United States Census Bureau, the town has a total area of 1.5 square miles (3.9 km^{2}), of which 1.4 square miles (3.6 km^{2}) is land and 0.69% is water.

== Demographics ==
Historical population
Census	Pop.	Note	%±
1900	187		—
1910	165		−11.8%
1920	275		66.7%
1930	346		25.8%
1940	495		43.1%
1950	479		−3.2%
1960	572		19.4%
1970	910		59.1%
1980	920		1.1%
1990	1,046		13.7%
2000	1,144		9.4%
2010	1,155		1.0%
2020	868		−24.8%
U.S. Decennial Census

=== 2020 census ===
Plantersville Racial Composition
Race	Num.	Perc.
White	344	39.63%
Black or African American	474	54.61%
Pacific Islander	1	0.12%
Other/Mixed	30	3.46%
Hispanic or Latino	19	2.19%

As of the 2020 United States census, there were 868 people, 390 households, and 246 families residing in the town.

=== 2000 census ===
As of the census of 2000, there were 1,144 people, 416 households, and 301 families residing in the town. The population density was 792.7 inhabitants per square mile (306.1/km^{2}). There were 474 housing units at an average density of 328.4 per square mile (126.8/km^{2}). The racial makeup of the town was 55.33% White, 42.40% African American, 0.17% Native American, 0.44% from other races, and 1.66% from two or more races. Hispanic or Latino of any race were 1.92% of the population.

There were 416 households, out of which 37.3% had children under the age of 18 living with them, 48.6% were married couples living together, 18.3% had a female householder with no husband present, and 27.6% were non-families. 22.4% of all households were made up of individuals, and 6.7% had someone living alone who was 65 years of age or older. The average household size was 2.69 and the average family size was 3.18.

In the town, the population was spread out, with 29.5% under the age of 18, 10.5% from 18 to 24, 29.2% from 25 to 44, 21.0% from 45 to 64, and 9.8% who were 65 years of age or older. The median age was 33 years. For every 100 females, there were 86.3 males. For every 100 females age 18 and over, there were 82.8 males.

The median income for a household in the town was $26,333, and the median income for a family was $32,237. Males had a median income of $28,125 versus $20,069 for females. The per capita income for the town was $12,852. About 19.9% of families and 24.2% of the population were below the poverty line, including 31.8% of those under age 18 and 25.8% of those age 65 or over.

== Education ==
The Town of Plantersville is served by the Lee County School District.

== Notable person ==
- Steve Holland, member of the Mississippi House of Representatives from 1985 to 2020.
