= List of municipalities in Mississippi =

Map of the United States with Mississippi highlighted

Mississippi is a state in the Southern United States. According to the 2020 United States Census, Mississippi is the 32nd-most populous state, with 2,949,965 inhabitants and the 31st largest by land area, spanning 46,923.27 square miles (121,530.7 km^{2}) of land. Mississippi is divided into 82 counties and contains 299 municipalities, consisting of cities, towns, and villages. Mississippi's municipalities cover 4.3% of the state's land mass and are home to 50.5% of its population.

Municipalities in Mississippi are classified according to population size. At time of incorporation, municipalities with populations of more than 2,000 are classified as cities, municipalities containing between 301 and 2000 persons are classified as towns, and municipalities between 100 and 300 persons are classified as villages. Places may be incorporated to become a city, town, or village through a petition signed by two-thirds of the qualified voters who reside in the proposed municipality. The major function of municipal governments are to provide services for its citizens such as maintaining roads and bridges, providing law, fire protection, and health and sanitation services.

As of the 2020 United States Census, the largest municipality by population in Mississippi is Jackson, with 153,701 residents, and the smallest is Satartia, with 41 residents. The largest municipality by land area is Jackson, which spans 111.05 mi^{2} (287.6 km^{2}), while Sidon is the smallest, at 0.12 mi^{2} (0.31 km^{2}). The city of Natchez is the oldest municipality in Mississippi, incorporated on March 10, 1803, and the city of Gluckstadt is the state's newest municipality, incorporated in June 2021.

== List of municipalities ==
Largest cities, towns, and villages in Mississippi by population

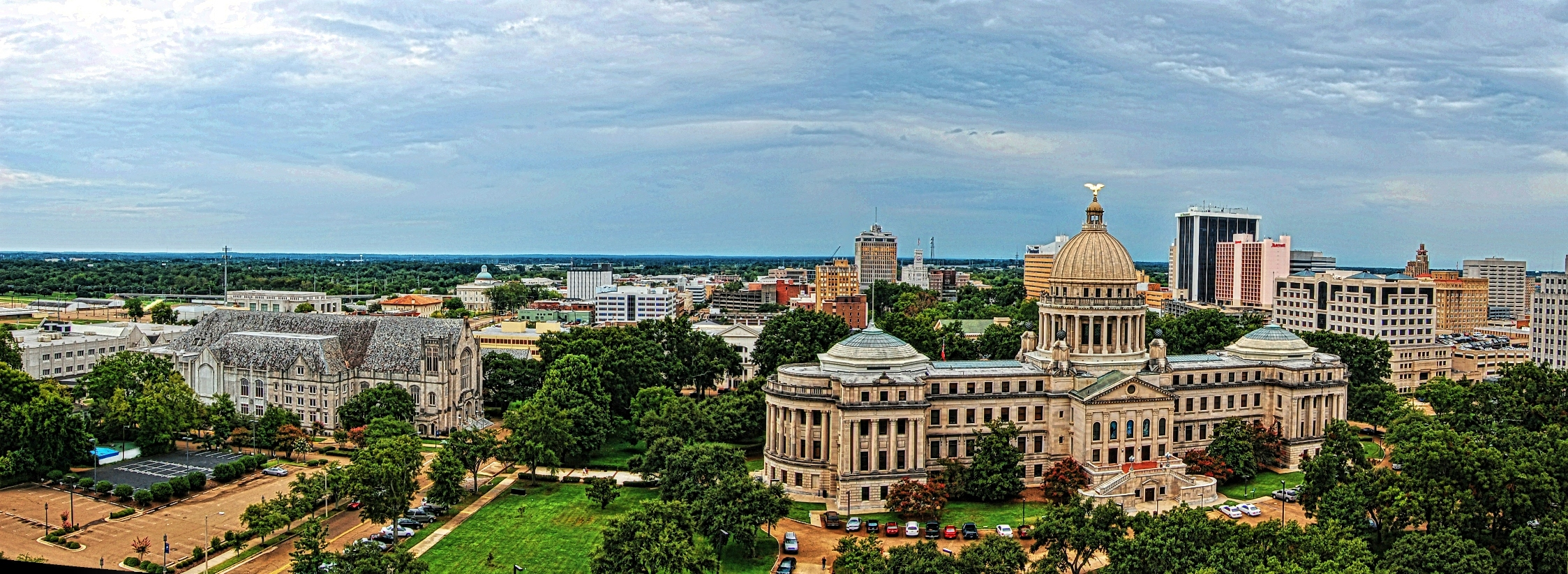
Downtown Jackson, the capital and largest city in Mississippi by population

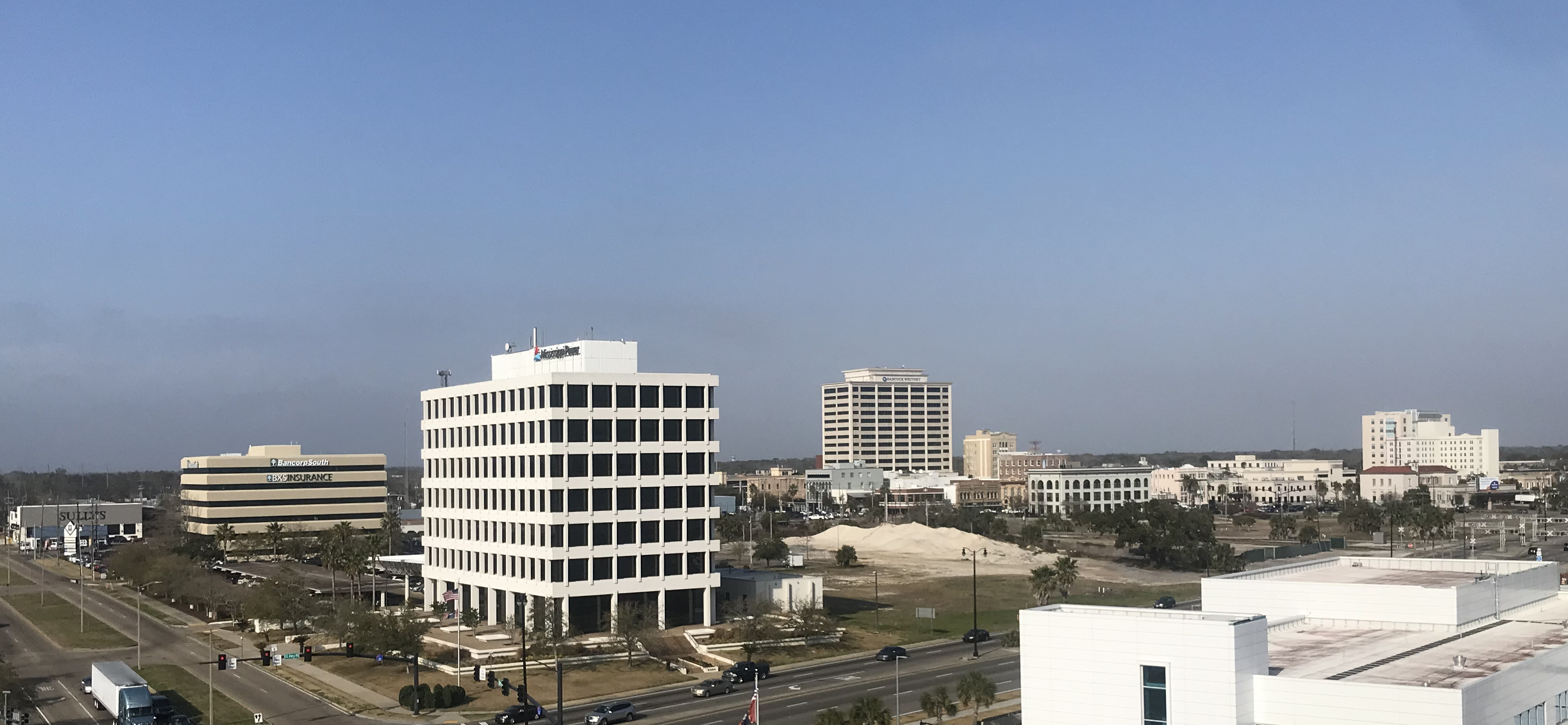
Downtown Gulfport, the second largest city in Mississippi by population

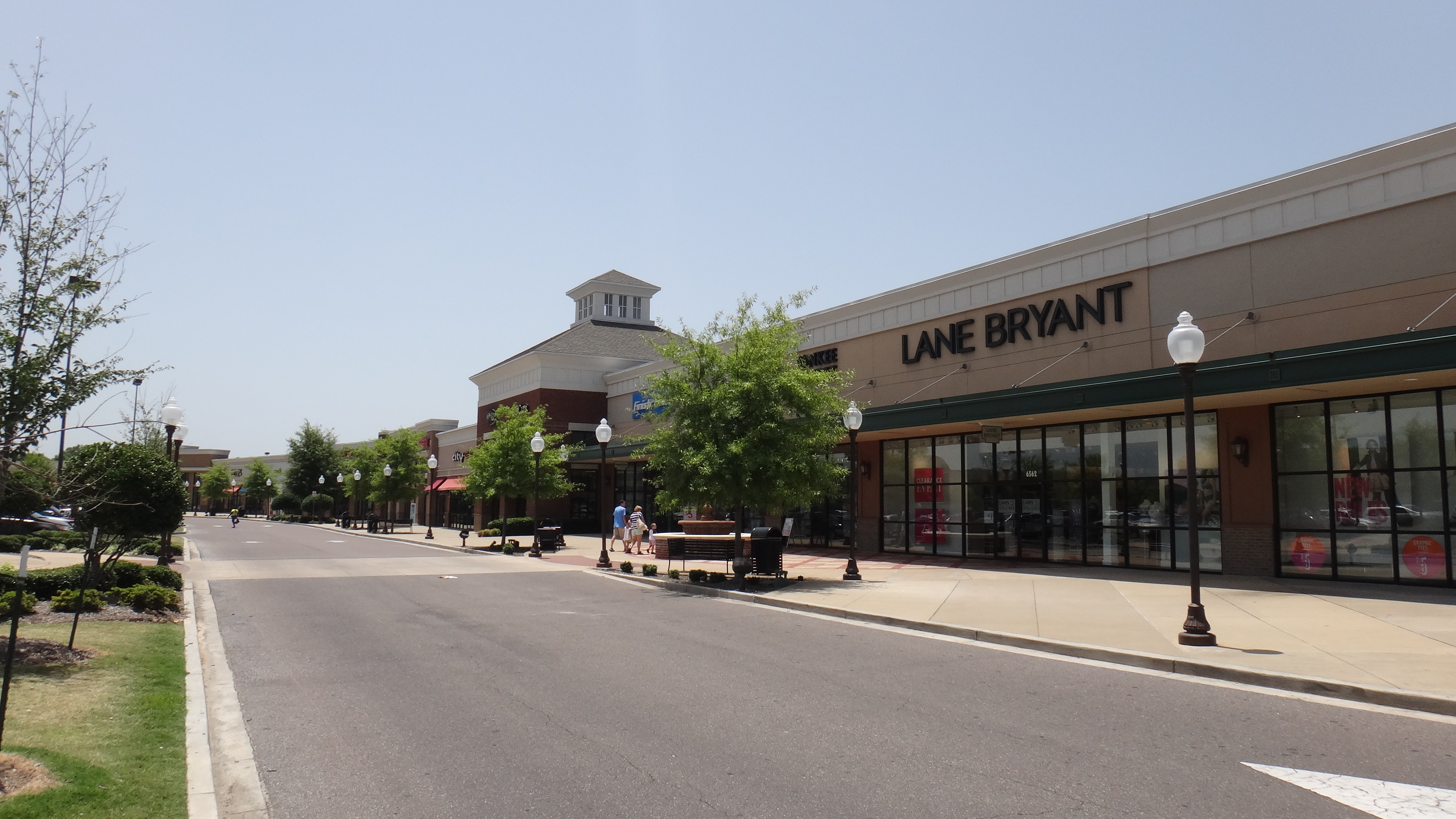
Southaven, suburb of Memphis, Tennessee and third largest city in Mississippi by population

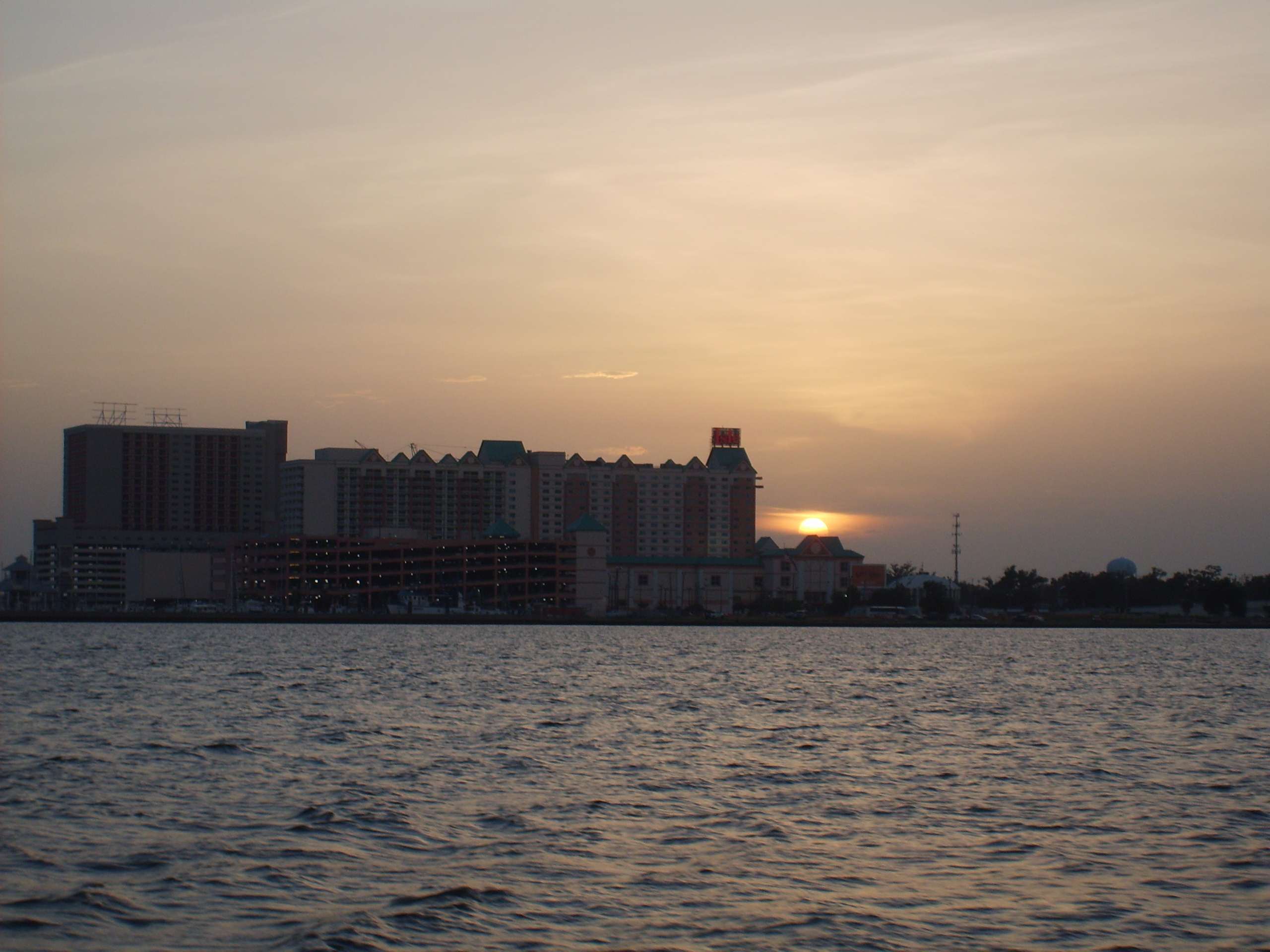
Biloxi, the fourth largest city in Mississippi by population

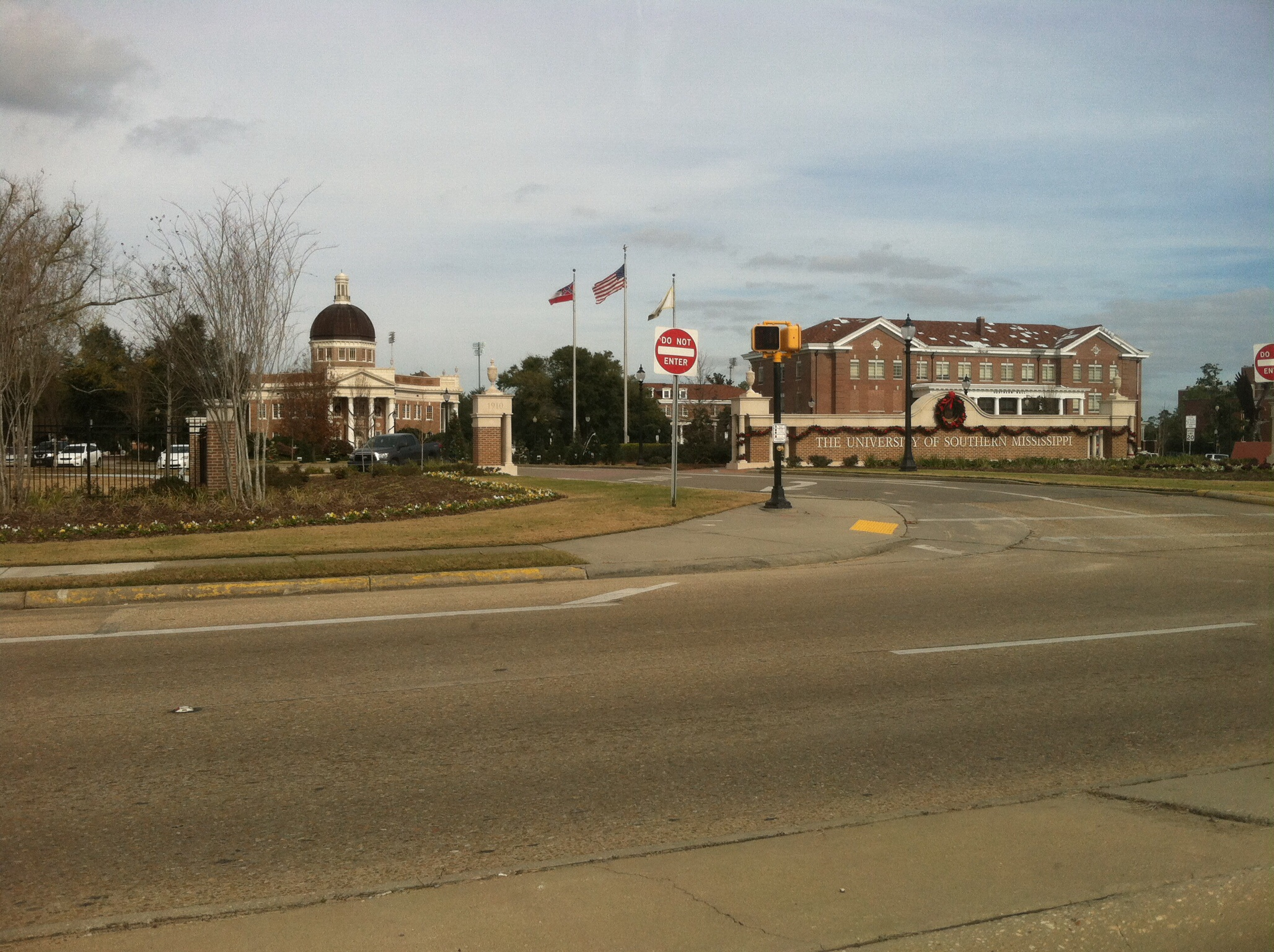
Hattiesburg, the fifth largest city in Mississippi by population

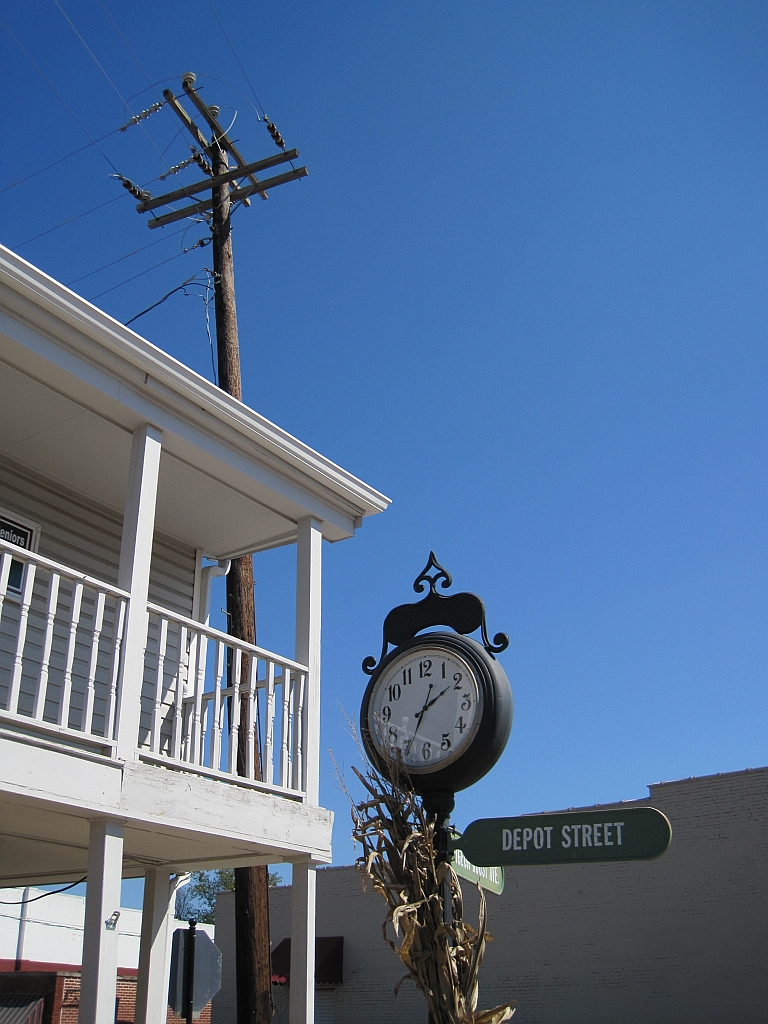
Olive Branch, the sixth largest city in Mississippi by population

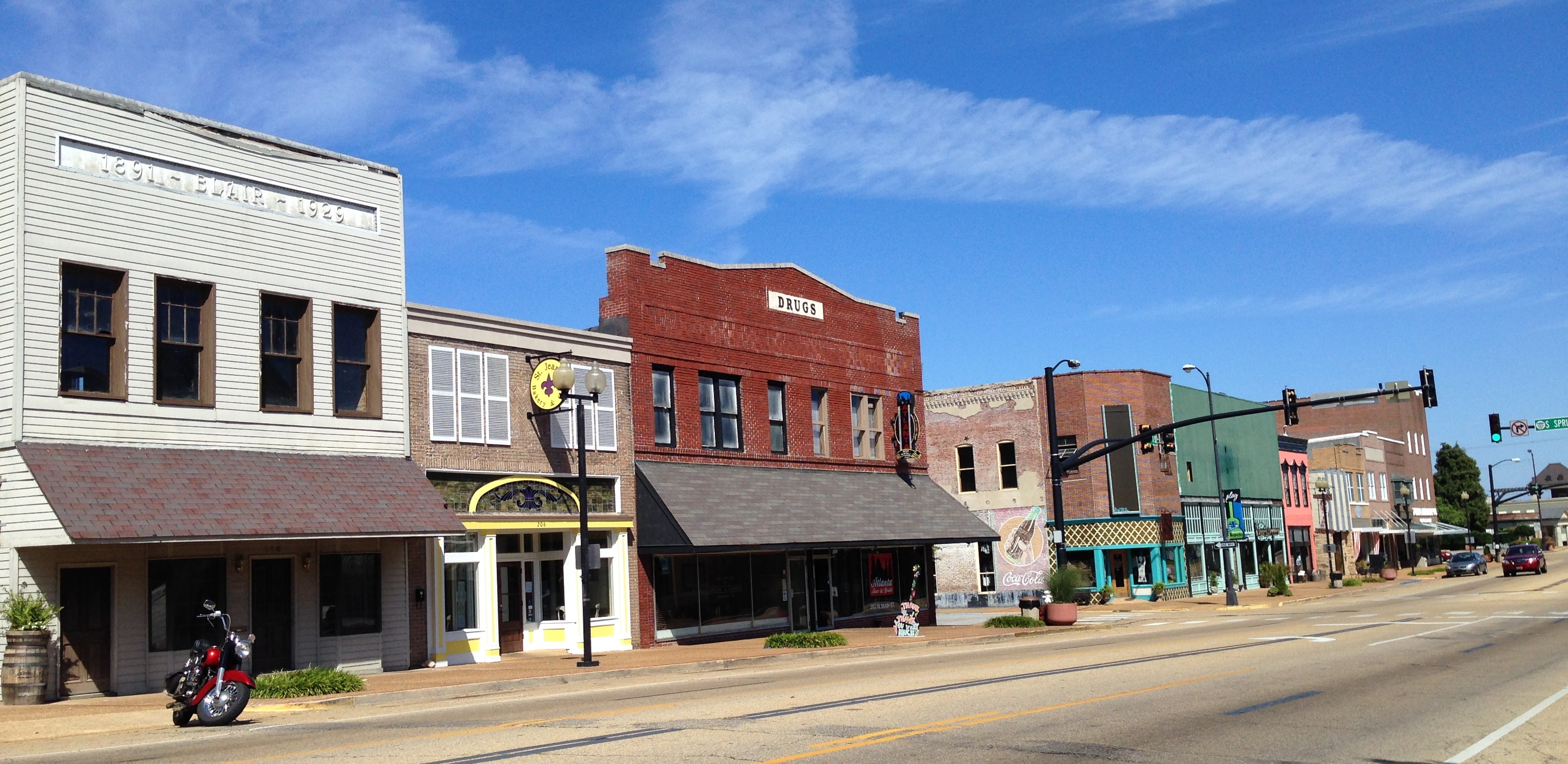
Downtown Tupelo, the seventh largest city in Mississippi by population

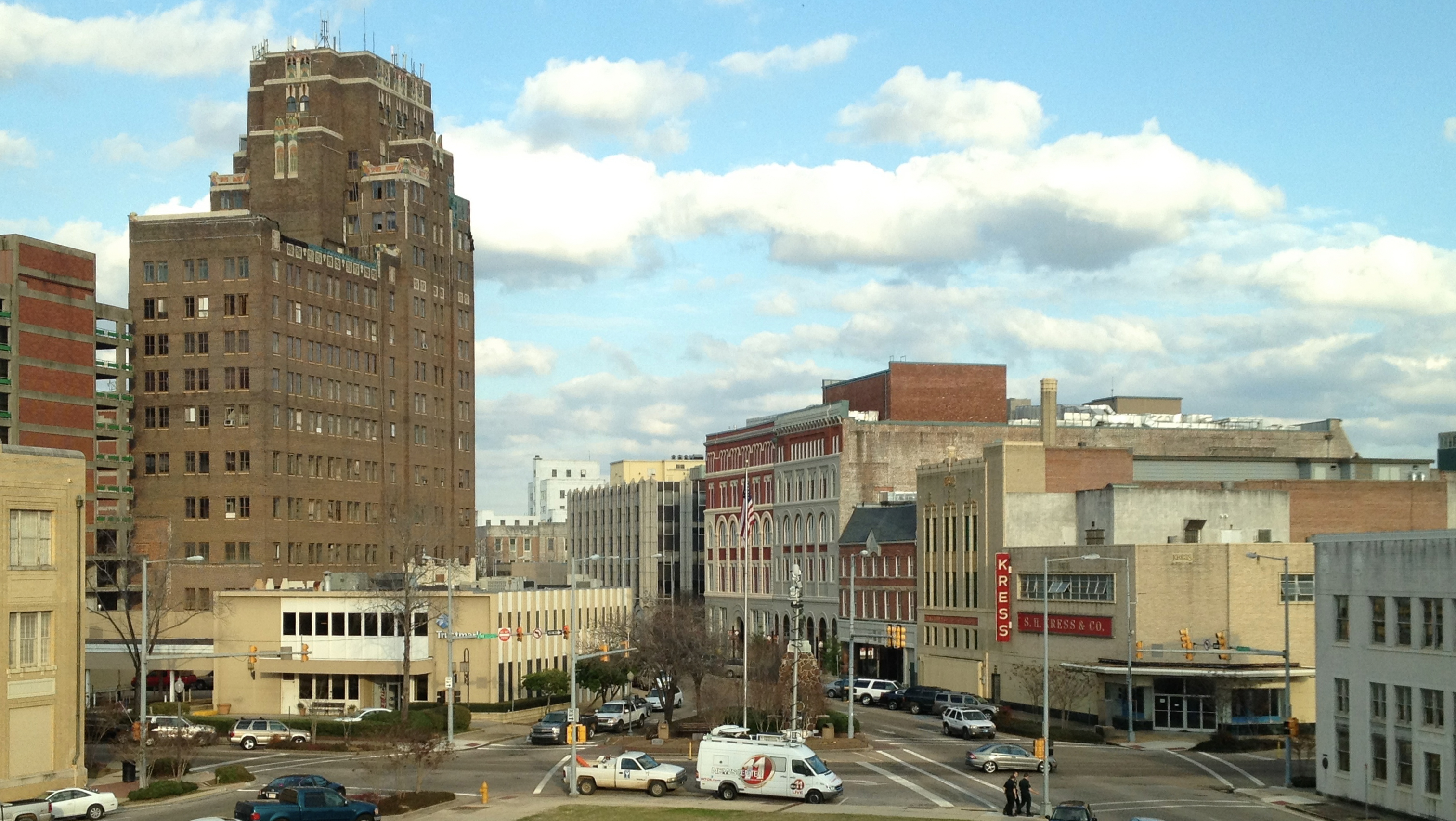
Downtown Meridian, the eighth largest city in Mississippi by population

† County seat

‡ State capital and county seat

Name	Type	County	Population (2020)	Population (2010)	Change	Land area (2020)		Population density	Incorporation date
Name	Type	County	Population (2020)	Population (2010)	Change	sq mi	km^{2}	Population density	Incorporation date
Abbeville	Town	Lafayette	372	419	−11.2%	3.46	9.0	107.5/sq mi (41.5/km^{2})	June 24, 1870
Aberdeen†	City	Monroe	4,961	5,612	−11.6%	12.09	31.3	410.3/sq mi (158.4/km^{2})	May 12, 1837
Ackerman†	Town	Choctaw	1,594	1,510	+5.6%	2.25	5.8	708.4/sq mi (273.5/km^{2})	February 16, 1884
Algoma	Town	Pontotoc	705	590	+19.5%	6.60	17.1	106.8/sq mi (41.2/km^{2})	September 14, 1987
Alligator	Town	Bolivar	116	208	−44.2%	0.99	2.6	117.2/sq mi (45.2/km^{2})	July 9, 1927
Amory	City	Monroe	6,666	7,316	−8.9%	12.54	32.5	531.6/sq mi (205.2/km^{2})	February 7, 1888
Anguilla	Town	Sharkey	496	726	−31.7%	1.03	2.7	481.6/sq mi (185.9/km^{2})	October 4, 1913
Arcola	Town	Washington	304	361	−15.8%	0.22	0.57	1,381.8/sq mi (533.5/km^{2})	September 30, 1904
Artesia	Town	Lowndes	304	440	−30.9%	0.73	1.9	416.4/sq mi (160.8/km^{2})	February 5, 1875
Ashland†	Town	Benton	551	569	−3.2%	1.82	4.7	302.7/sq mi (116.9/km^{2})	March 8, 1871
Baldwyn	City	Lee, Prentiss	3,071	3,297	−6.9%	11.59	30.0	284.5/sq mi (109.8/km^{2})	April 1, 1861
Bassfield	Town	Jefferson Davis	192	254	−24.4%	1.09	2.8	176.1/sq mi (68.0/km^{2})	October 6, 1903
Batesville†	City	Panola	7,523	7,463	+0.8%	19.95	51.7	377.1/sq mi (145.6/km^{2})	August 10, 1860
Bay St. Louis†	City	Hancock	9,284	9,260	+0.3%	14.69	38.0	630.4/sq mi (243.4/km^{2})	March 10, 1904
Bay Springs†	City	Jasper	1,670	1,786	−6.5%	14.94	38.7	111.8/sq mi (43.2/km^{2})	February 22, 1882
Beaumont	Town	Perry	669	951	−29.7%	3.45	8.9	193.9/sq mi (74.9/km^{2})	August 5, 1955
Beauregard	Village	Copiah	289	326	−11.3%	0.92	2.4	314.1/sq mi (121.3/km^{2})	November 21, 1865
Belmont	Town	Tishomingo	1,859	2,021	−8.0%	4.65	12.0	434.6/sq mi (167.8/km^{2})	January 22, 1908
Belzoni†	City	Humphreys	1,938	2,235	−13.3%	1.02	2.6	1,900.0/sq mi (733.6/km^{2})	March 12, 1895
Benoit	Town	Bolivar	365	477	−23.5%	0.97	2.5	376.3/sq mi (145.3/km^{2})	February 19, 1890
Bentonia	Town	Yazoo	319	440	−27.5%	1.42	3.7	309.9/sq mi (119.6/km^{2})	March 14, 1884
Beulah	Town	Bolivar	242	473	−48.8%	0.46	1.2	526.1/sq mi (203.1/km^{2})	March 7, 1882
Big Creek	Village	Calhoun	133	154	−13.6%	1.14	3.0	116.7/sq mi (45.0/km^{2})	July 13, 1905
Biloxi†	City	Harrison	49,449	44,054	+12.2%	38.22	99.0	1,293.8/sq mi (499.5/km^{2})	March 13, 1907
Blue Mountain	Town	Tippah	948	920	+3.0%	1.64	4.2	578.0/sq mi (223.2/km^{2})	February 8, 1838
Blue Springs	Village	Union	436	228	+91.2%	1.02	2.6	427.5/sq mi (165.0/km^{2})	January 31, 1877
Bolton	Town	Hinds	441	567	−22.2%	1.52	3.9	290.1/sq mi (112.0/km^{2})	March 15, 1888
Booneville†	City	Prentiss	9,126	8,743	+4.4%	25.75	66.7	354.4/sq mi (136.8/km^{2})	May 8, 1871
Boyle	Town	Bolivar	532	650	−18.2%	1.40	3.6	380.0/sq mi (146.7/km^{2})	December 12, 1861
Brandon†	City	Rankin	25,138	21,705	+15.8%	25.91	67.1	970.2/sq mi (374.6/km^{2})	August 5, 1895
Braxton	Village	Simpson	186	183	+1.6%	0.59	1.5	315.3/sq mi (121.7/km^{2})	December 19, 1831
Brookhaven†	City	Lincoln	11,674	12,513	−6.7%	21.64	56.0	539.5/sq mi (208.3/km^{2})	December 9, 1901
Brooksville	Town	Noxubee	915	1,223	−25.2%	1.59	4.1	575.5/sq mi (222.2/km^{2})	November 15, 1858
Bruce	Town	Calhoun	1,707	1,939	−12.0%	2.44	6.3	699.6/sq mi (270.1/km^{2})	February 7, 1860
Bude	Town	Franklin	780	1,063	−26.6%	1.43	3.7	545.5/sq mi (210.6/km^{2})	June 16, 1927
Burnsville	Town	Tishomingo	868	936	−7.3%	4.77	12.4	182.0/sq mi (70.3/km^{2})	April 30, 1914
Byhalia	Town	Marshall	1,339	1,302	+2.8%	7.17	18.6	186.8/sq mi (72.1/km^{2})	January 25, 1858
Byram	City	Hinds	12,666	11,489	+10.2%	18.4	48	688.4/sq mi (265.8/km^{2})	June 16, 2009
Caledonia	Town	Lowndes	1,135	1,041	+9.0%	2.82	7.3	402.5/sq mi (155.4/km^{2})	April 21, 1873
Calhoun City	Town	Calhoun	1,533	1,774	−13.6%	2.36	6.1	649.6/sq mi (250.8/km^{2})	December 23, 1904
Canton†	City	Madison	10,948	13,189	−17.0%	21.24	55.0	515.4/sq mi (199.0/km^{2})	July 23, 1906
Carrollton†	Town	Carroll	423	190	+122.6%	0.78	2.0	243.6/sq mi (94.1/km^{2})	February 27, 1836
Carthage†	City	Leake	4,901	5,075	−3.4%	9.29	24.1	527.6/sq mi (203.7/km^{2})	February 27, 1836
Cary	Town	Sharkey	241	313	−23.0%	0.71	1.8	339.4/sq mi (131.1/km^{2})	May 12, 1837
Centreville	Town	Amite, Wilkinson	1,258	1,684	−25.3%	2.32	6.0	542.2/sq mi (209.4/km^{2})	February 5, 1880
Charleston†	City	Tallahatchie	1,884	2,193	−14.1%	1.35	3.5	1,395.6/sq mi (538.8/km^{2})	February 28, 1848
Chunky	Town	Newton	272	326	−16.6%	0.83	2.1	327.7/sq mi (126.5/km^{2})	December 24, 1900
Clarksdale†	City	Coahoma	14,903	17,962	−17.0%	13.89	36.0	1,293.2/sq mi (499.3/km^{2})	February 25, 1882
Cleveland†	City	Bolivar	11,199	12,334	−9.2%	7.30	18.9	1,534.1/sq mi (592.3/km^{2})	March 25, 1886
Clinton	City	Hinds	28,100	25,216	+11.4%	41.82	108.3	671.9/sq mi (259.4/km^{2})	February 12, 1830
Coahoma	Town	Coahoma	229	377	−39.3%	0.20	0.52	1,145.0/sq mi (442.1/km^{2})	February 18, 1890
Coffeeville†	Town	Yalobusha	797	905	−11.9%	2.14	5.5	372.4/sq mi (143.8/km^{2})	February 7, 1836
Coldwater	Town	Tate	1,381	1,677	−17.7%	2.37	6.1	582.7/sq mi (225.0/km^{2})	November 15, 1858
Collins†	City	Covington	2,342	2,586	−9.4%	7.96	20.6	324.9/sq mi (125.4/km^{2})	November 27, 1906
Columbia†	City	Marion	5,864	6,582	−10.9%	6.75	17.5	975.1/sq mi (376.5/km^{2})	December 16, 1812
Columbus†	City	Lowndes	24,084	23,640	+1.9%	22.06	57.1	1,091.7/sq mi (421.5/km^{2})	February 1822
Como	Town	Panola	1,118	1,279	−12.6%	1.89	4.9	676.7/sq mi (261.3/km^{2})	February 20, 1880
Corinth†	City	Alcorn	14,622	14,573	+0.3%	30.16	78.1	484.8/sq mi (187.2/km^{2})	March 12, 1856
Courtland	Town	Panola	470	511	−8.0%	1.13	2.9	415.9/sq mi (160.6/km^{2})	March 30, 1871
Crawford	Town	Lowndes	415	641	−35.3%	1.40	3.6	296.4/sq mi (114.5/km^{2})	January 26, 1854
Crenshaw	Town	Panola, Quitman	638	885	−27.9%	0.41	1.1	2,158.5/sq mi (833.4/km^{2})	August 22, 1903
Crosby	Town	Amite, Wilkinson	242	318	−23.9%	2.12	5.5	114.2/sq mi (44.1/km^{2})	April 4, 1934
Crowder	Town	Panola, Quitman	573	712	−19.5%	0.46	1.2	1,245.7/sq mi (480.9/km^{2})	March 2, 1917
Cruger	Town	Holmes	268	386	−30.6%	0.96	2.5	279.2/sq mi (107.8/km^{2})	March 19, 1890
Crystal Springs	City	Copiah	4,862	5,044	−3.6%	5.43	14.1	895.4/sq mi (345.7/km^{2})	June 4, 1859
Decatur†	Town	Newton	1,945	1,841	+5.6%	5.50	14.2	353.6/sq mi (136.5/km^{2})	February 22, 1840
De Kalb†	Town	Kemper	877	1,164	−24.7%	3.32	8.6	264.2/sq mi (102.0/km^{2})	February 16, 1839
Derma	Town	Calhoun	957	1,025	−6.6%	1.77	4.6	540.7/sq mi (208.8/km^{2})	November 21, 1905
D'Iberville	City	Harrison	12,721	9,486	+34.1%	7.06	18.3	1,801.8/sq mi (695.7/km^{2})	February 11, 1988
D'Lo	Town	Simpson	373	452	−17.5%	0.69	1.8	540.6/sq mi (208.7/km^{2})	August 16, 1901
Diamondhead (Note: Census data is from Diamondhead Census Designated Place since the city incorporated in 2012.)	City	Hancock	9,529	8,425	+13.1%	11.09	28.7	859.2/sq mi (331.8/km^{2})	February 6, 2012
Doddsville	Town	Sunflower	69	98	−29.6%	0.77	2.0	89.6/sq mi (34.6/km^{2})	September 17, 1920
Drew	City	Sunflower	1,852	1,927	−3.9%	1.12	2.9	1,720.5/sq mi (664.3/km^{2})	September 23, 1899
Duck Hill	Town	Montgomery	619	732	−15.4%	1.03	2.7	601.0/sq mi (232.0/km^{2})	July 21, 1870
Dumas	Town	Tippah	471	470	+0.2%	3.90	10.1	120.8/sq mi (46.6/km^{2})	December 21, 1874
Duncan	Town	Bolivar	276	423	−34.8%	0.92	2.4	300.0/sq mi (115.8/km^{2})	February 24, 1890
Durant	City	Holmes	2,231	2,673	−16.5%	2.24	5.8	996.0/sq mi (384.6/km^{2})	November 21, 1865
Ecru	Town	Pontotoc	901	895	+0.7%	4.72	12.2	190.9/sq mi (73.7/km^{2})	November 19, 1904
Eden	Village	Yazoo	133	103	+29.1%	0.47	1.2	283.0/sq mi (109.3/km^{2})	February 24, 1890
Edwards	Town	Hinds	995	1,034	−3.8%	1.66	4.3	599.4/sq mi (231.4/km^{2})	June 21, 1871
Ellisville†	City	Jones	4,652	4,448	+4.6%	10.52	27.2	442.2/sq mi (170.7/km^{2})	March 11, 1884
Enterprise	Town	Clarke	496	526	−5.7%	2.44	6.3	203.3/sq mi (78.5/km^{2})	February 18, 1846
Ethel	Town	Attala	348	418	−16.7%	0.58	1.5	600.0/sq mi (231.7/km^{2})	June 7, 1911
Eupora	City	Webster	2,018	2,197	−8.1%	3.32	8.6	607.8/sq mi (234.7/km^{2})	May 14, 1890
Falcon	Town	Quitman	116	167	−30.5%	0.39	1.0	297.4/sq mi (114.8/km^{2})	April 5, 1971
Falkner	Town	Tippah	437	514	−15.0%	5.07	13.1	86.2/sq mi (33.3/km^{2})	April 2, 1874
Farmington	Town	Alcorn	2,186	2,186	0.0%	6.38	16.5	322.1/sq mi (124.4/km^{2})	September 9, 1997
Fayette†	City	Jefferson	1,445	1,614	−10.5%	1.18	3.1	1,367.8/sq mi (528.1/km^{2})	February 12, 1830
Flora	Town	Madison	1,647	1,886	−12.7%	3.02	7.8	545.4/sq mi (210.6/km^{2})	January 29, 1886
Florence	Town	Rankin	4,572	4,141	+10.4%	8.07	20.9	566.5/sq mi (218.7/km^{2})	May 30, 1905
Flowood	City	Rankin	10,202	7,823	+30.4%	28.41	73.6	359.1/sq mi (138.6/km^{2})	November 20, 1950
Forest†	City	Scott	5,430	5,684	−4.5%	13.08	33.9	415.1/sq mi (160.3/km^{2})	November 21, 1865
French Camp	Town	Choctaw	256	174	+47.1%	0.98	2.5	261.2/sq mi (100.9/km^{2})	February 27, 1854
Friars Point	Town	Coahoma	896	1,200	−25.3%	1.10	2.8	814.5/sq mi (314.5/km^{2})	October 31, 1865
Fulton†	City	Itawamba	4,542	3,961	+14.7%	8.49	22.0	535.0/sq mi (206.6/km^{2})	May 11, 1837
Gattman	Village	Monroe	77	90	−14.4%	0.56	1.5	137.5/sq mi (53.1/km^{2})	February 4, 1829
Gautier	City	Jackson	19,024	18,572	+2.4%	30.23	78.3	629.3/sq mi (243.0/km^{2})	May 14, 1986
Georgetown	Town	Copiah	252	286	−11.9%	0.67	1.7	376.1/sq mi (145.2/km^{2})	September 27, 1909
Glen	Town	Alcorn	382	412	−7.3%	4.66	12.1	82.0/sq mi (31.7/km^{2})	April 23, 1993
Glendora	Village	Tallahatchie	154	151	+2.0%	0.14	0.36	1,100.0/sq mi (424.7/km^{2})	March 19, 1900
Gloster	Town	Amite	897	960	−6.6%	1.82	4.7	492.9/sq mi (190.3/km^{2})	March 11, 1884
Gluckstadt (Note: Census data is from Gluckstadt Census Designated Place since the city incorporated in 2021.)	City	Madison	3,208	—	—	10.8	28	297.0/sq mi (114.7/km^{2})	June 5, 2021
Golden	Town	Tishomingo	192	191	+0.5%	0.58	1.5	331.0/sq mi (127.8/km^{2})	February 8, 1908
Goodman	Town	Holmes	1,258	1,386	−9.2%	0.82	2.1	1,534.1/sq mi (592.3/km^{2})	November 21, 1865
Greenville†	City	Washington	29,670	34,400	−13.7%	26.89	69.6	1,103.4/sq mi (426.0/km^{2})	June 24, 1870
Greenwood†	City	Leflore	14,490	15,205	−4.7%	12.34	32.0	1,174.2/sq mi (453.4/km^{2})	February 16, 1844
Grenada†	City	Grenada	12,700	13,092	−3.0%	30.01	77.7	423.2/sq mi (163.4/km^{2})	February 27, 1836
Gulfport†	City	Harrison	72,926	67,793	+7.6%	55.59	144.0	1,311.9/sq mi (506.5/km^{2})	July 28, 1898
Gunnison	Town	Bolivar	295	452	−34.7%	0.98	2.5	301.0/sq mi (116.2/km^{2})	May 7, 1892
Guntown	City	Lee	2,410	2,083	+15.7%	4.66	12.1	517.2/sq mi (199.7/km^{2})	February 16, 1867
Hatley	Town	Monroe	495	482	+2.7%	1.37	3.5	361.3/sq mi (139.5/km^{2})	February 14, 1914
Hattiesburg†	City	Forrest, Lamar	48,730	45,989	+6.0%	53.39	138.3	912.7/sq mi (352.4/km^{2})	March 11, 1884
Hazlehurst†	City	Copiah	3,619	4,009	−9.7%	4.38	11.3	915.3/sq mi (353.4/km^{2})	September 21, 1859
Heidelberg	Town	Jasper	637	718	−11.3%	5.11	13.2	124.7/sq mi (48.1/km^{2})	March 12, 1884
Hernando†	City	DeSoto	17,138	14,090	+21.6%	25.73	66.6	666.1/sq mi (257.2/km^{2})	May 13, 1837
Hickory	Town	Newton	408	530	−23.0%	0.94	2.4	434.0/sq mi (167.6/km^{2})	December 5, 1865
Hickory Flat	Town	Benton	496	601	−17.5%	0.96	2.5	516.7/sq mi (199.5/km^{2})	April 6, 1874
Hollandale	City	Washington	2,323	2,702	−14.0%	2.22	5.7	1,046.4/sq mi (404.0/km^{2})	February 24, 1890
Holly Springs†	City	Marshall	6,968	7,957	−12.4%	12.78	33.1	545.2/sq mi (210.5/km^{2})	May 12, 1837
Horn Lake	City	DeSoto	26,736	26,066	+2.6%	16.02	41.5	1,668.9/sq mi (644.4/km^{2})	April 13, 1871
Houston†	City	Chickasaw	3,797	3,623	+4.8%	7.38	19.1	514.5/sq mi (198.6/km^{2})	May 9, 1837
Indianola†	City	Sunflower	9,646	10,683	−9.7%	8.57	22.2	1,125.6/sq mi (434.6/km^{2})	January 7, 1886
Inverness	Town	Sunflower	868	1,019	−14.8%	1.44	3.7	602.8/sq mi (232.7/km^{2})	March 5, 1904
Isola	Town	Humphreys	638	713	−10.5%	0.74	1.9	862.2/sq mi (332.9/km^{2})	June 1, 1910
Itta Bena	City	Leflore	1,679	2,049	−18.1%	1.42	3.7	1,182.4/sq mi (456.5/km^{2})	August 1, 1898
Iuka†	City	Tishomingo	3,139	3,028	+3.7%	9.69	25.1	323.9/sq mi (125.1/km^{2})	December 11, 1857
Jackson‡	City	Hinds, Madison, Rankin	153,701	173,514	−11.4%	111.05	287.6	1,384.1/sq mi (534.4/km^{2})	February 22, 1840
Jonestown	Town	Coahoma	962	1,298	−25.9%	0.39	1.0	2,466.7/sq mi (952.4/km^{2})	March 6, 1880
Jumpertown	Town	Prentiss	425	480	−11.5%	1.79	4.6	237.4/sq mi (91.7/km^{2})	November 26, 1975
Kilmichael	Town	Montgomery	639	699	−8.6%	2.79	7.2	229.0/sq mi (88.4/km^{2})	December 24, 1906
Kosciusko†	City	Attala	7,114	7,402	−3.9%	7.54	19.5	943.5/sq mi (364.3/km^{2})	February 27, 1836
Kossuth	Village	Alcorn	160	209	−23.4%	0.96	2.5	166.7/sq mi (64.4/km^{2})	July 19, 1870
Lake	Town	Newton, Scott	475	324	+46.6%	1.11	2.9	427.9/sq mi (165.2/km^{2})	February 9, 1867
Lambert	Town	Quitman	1,273	1,638	−22.3%	0.85	2.2	1,497.6/sq mi (578.2/km^{2})	May 12, 1905
Laurel†	City	Jones	17,161	18,540	−7.4%	16.24	42.1	1,056.7/sq mi (408.0/km^{2})	March 11, 1886
Leakesville†	Town	Greene	3,775	898	+320.4%	1.58	4.1	2,389.2/sq mi (922.5/km^{2})	January 7, 1904
Learned	Town	Hinds	56	94	−40.4%	0.34	0.88	164.7/sq mi (63.6/km^{2})	March 14, 1884
Leland	City	Washington	3,988	4,481	−11.0%	3.59	9.3	1,110.9/sq mi (428.9/km^{2})	February 20, 1886
Lena	Town	Leake	157	148	+6.1%	1.66	4.3	94.6/sq mi (36.5/km^{2})	April 18, 1912
Lexington†	City	Holmes	1,602	1,731	−7.5%	2.42	6.3	662.0/sq mi (255.6/km^{2})	February 25, 1836
Liberty†	Town	Amite	560	728	−23.1%	2.06	5.3	353.4/sq mi (136.4/km^{2})	February 24, 1809
Long Beach	City	Harrison	16,780	14,792	+13.4%	10.00	25.9	1,678.0/sq mi (647.9/km^{2})	August 10, 1905
Louin	Town	Jasper	275	277	−0.7%	6.06	15.7	45.4/sq mi (17.5/km^{2})	July 29, 1904
Louise	Town	Humphreys	178	199	−10.6%	0.18	0.47	988.9/sq mi (381.8/km^{2})	December 8, 1909
Louisville†	City	Winston	6,072	6,631	−8.4%	15.07	39.0	402.9/sq mi (155.6/km^{2})	February 14, 1836
Lucedale†	City	George	2,869	2,923	−1.8%	6.39	16.6	449.0/sq mi (173.4/km^{2})	June 6, 1901
Lula	Town	Coahoma	204	298	−31.5%	0.42	1.1	485.7/sq mi (187.5/km^{2})	February 24, 1890
Lumberton	City	Lamar, Pearl River	1,617	2,086	−22.5%	7.24	18.8	223.3/sq mi (86.2/km^{2})	January 28, 1895
Lyon	Town	Coahoma	296	350	−15.4%	0.47	1.2	629.8/sq mi (243.2/km^{2})	April 10, 1899
Maben	Town	Oktibbeha, Webster	771	871	−11.5%	1.94	5.0	397.4/sq mi (153.4/km^{2})	February 13, 1890
McComb	City	Pike	12,413	12,790	−2.9%	11.57	30.0	1,072.9/sq mi (414.2/km^{2})	April 5, 1872
McCool	Town	Attala	103	135	−23.7%	0.94	2.4	109.6/sq mi (42.3/km^{2})	January 24, 1884
McLain	Town	Greene	313	441	−29.0%	3.39	8.8	92.3/sq mi (35.6/km^{2})	May 27, 1903
Macon†	City	Noxubee	2,582	2,768	−6.7%	3.83	9.9	674.2/sq mi (260.3/km^{2})	February 14, 1836
Madison	City	Madison	27,747	24,149	+14.9%	25.22	65.3	1,100.2/sq mi (424.8/km^{2})	November 30, 1944
Magee	City	Simpson	2,988	4,408	−32.2%	5.13	13.3	582.5/sq mi (224.9/km^{2})	July 23, 1900
Magnolia†	City	Pike	2,420	2,071	+16.9%	6.14	15.9	394.1/sq mi (152.2/km^{2})	April 26, 1859
Mantachie	Town	Itawamba	1,121	1,144	−2.0%	3.94	10.2	284.5/sq mi (109.9/km^{2})	June 4, 1903
Mantee	Village	Webster	237	232	+2.2%	4.49	11.6	52.8/sq mi (20.4/km^{2})	February 9, 1900
Marietta	Town	Prentiss	198	256	−22.7%	1.78	4.6	111.2/sq mi (42.9/km^{2})	March 12, 1856
Marion	Town	Lauderdale	1,751	1,479	+18.4%	2.91	7.5	508.2/sq mi (196.2/km^{2})	February 8, 1838
Marks†	City	Quitman	1,444	1,735	−16.8%	1.28	3.3	1,128.1/sq mi (435.6/km^{2})	January 1, 1907
Mathiston	Town	Choctaw, Webster	831	698	+19.1%	2.46	6.4	337.8/sq mi (130.4/km^{2})	February 24, 1890
Mayersville†	Town	Issaquena	433	547	−20.8%	1.10	2.8	393.6/sq mi (152.0/km^{2})	April 5, 1872
Meadville†	Town	Franklin	448	449	−0.2%	1.10	2.8	407.3/sq mi (157.2/km^{2})	August 21, 1906
Mendenhall†	City	Simpson	2,199	2,504	−12.2%	5.35	13.9	411.0/sq mi (158.7/km^{2})	January 30, 1905
Meridian†	City	Lauderdale	35,052	41,148	−14.8%	53.74	139.2	652.3/sq mi (251.8/km^{2})	February 10, 1860
Merigold	Town	Bolivar	379	439	−13.7%	0.97	2.5	390.7/sq mi (150.9/km^{2})	March 11, 1901
Metcalfe	Town	Washington	816	1,067	−23.5%	1.00	2.6	816.0/sq mi (315.1/km^{2})	November 4, 1977
Mize	Town	Smith	317	340	−6.8%	2.31	6.0	137.2/sq mi (53.0/km^{2})	April 18, 1902
Monticello†	Town	Lawrence	1,441	1,571	−8.3%	4.17	10.8	345.6/sq mi (133.4/km^{2})	November 10, 1904
Montrose	Town	Jasper	104	140	−25.7%	2.71	7.0	38.4/sq mi (14.8/km^{2})	August 23, 1904
Moorhead	City	Sunflower	1,937	2,405	−19.5%	1.30	3.4	1,490.0/sq mi (575.3/km^{2})	December 14, 1899
Morgan City	Town	Leflore	207	255	−18.8%	0.59	1.5	350.8/sq mi (135.5/km^{2})	February 12, 1968
Morton	City	Scott	3,711	3,462	+7.2%	7.19	18.6	516.1/sq mi (199.3/km^{2})	April 10, 1861
Moss Point	City	Jackson	12,147	13,704	−11.4%	24.16	62.6	502.8/sq mi (194.1/km^{2})	April 29, 1901
Mound Bayou	City	Bolivar	1,534	1,533	+0.1%	0.88	2.3	1,743.2/sq mi (673.0/km^{2})	February 23, 1898
Mount Olive	Town	Covington	895	982	−8.9%	3.10	8.0	288.7/sq mi (111.5/km^{2})	May 18, 1900
Myrtle	Town	Union	484	490	−1.2%	2.08	5.4	232.7/sq mi (89.8/km^{2})	February 1, 1890
Natchez†	City	Adams	14,520	15,792	−8.1%	13.20	34.2	1,100.0/sq mi (424.7/km^{2})	March 10, 1803
Nettleton	City	Lee, Monroe	1,935	1,992	−2.9%	4.03	10.4	480.1/sq mi (185.4/km^{2})	March 9, 1888
New Albany†	City	Union	7,626	8,034	−5.1%	18.23	47.2	418.3/sq mi (161.5/km^{2})	March 4, 1850
New Augusta†	Town	Perry	554	644	−14.0%	5.14	13.3	107.8/sq mi (41.6/km^{2})	June 3, 1953
New Hebron	Town	Lawrence	386	447	−13.6%	0.67	1.7	576.1/sq mi (222.4/km^{2})	March 12, 1906
New Houlka	Town	Chickasaw	698	626	+11.5%	1.23	3.2	567.5/sq mi (219.1/km^{2})	November 20, 1905
Newton	City	Newton	3,195	3,373	−5.3%	7.15	18.5	446.9/sq mi (172.5/km^{2})	October 30, 1866
North Carrollton	Town	Carroll	405	473	−14.4%	0.32	0.83	1,265.6/sq mi (488.7/km^{2})	March 29, 1899
Noxapater	Town	Winston	390	472	−17.4%	1.01	2.6	386.1/sq mi (149.1/km^{2})	April 25, 1906
Oakland	Town	Yalobusha	462	527	−12.3%	1.37	3.5	337.2/sq mi (130.2/km^{2})	February 28, 1848
Ocean Springs	City	Jackson	17,442	18,429	−5.4%	11.52	29.8	1,599.7/sq mi (617.7/km^{2})	February 27, 1854
Okolona†	City	Chickasaw	2,513	2,692	−6.6%	6.65	17.2	377.9/sq mi (145.9/km^{2})	March 4, 1850
Olive Branch	City	DeSoto	39,711	33,484	+18.6%	36.70	95.1	1,082.0/sq mi (417.8/km^{2})	April 11, 1873
Osyka	Town	Pike	381	440	−13.4%	1.06	2.7	359.4/sq mi (138.8/km^{2})	November 3, 1858
Oxford†	City	Lafayette	25,416	18,916	+34.4%	15.83	41.0	1,605.6/sq mi (619.9/km^{2})	May 11, 1837
Pace	Town	Bolivar	183	274	−33.2%	0.15	0.39	1,220.0/sq mi (471.0/km^{2})	May 25, 1923
Pachuta	Town	Clarke	207	261	−20.7%	2.44	6.3	84.8/sq mi (32.8/km^{2})	February 5, 1890
Paden	Village	Tishomingo	104	116	−10.3%	0.90	2.3	115.6/sq mi (44.6/km^{2})	September 18, 1919
Pascagoula†	City	Jackson	22,010	22,392	−1.7%	15.38	39.8	1,431.1/sq mi (552.5/km^{2})	February 9, 1838
Pass Christian	City	Harrison	5,686	4,613	+23.3%	8.29	21.5	685.9/sq mi (264.8/km^{2})	February 21, 1848
Pearl	City	Rankin	27,115	25,092	+8.1%	23.60	61.1	1,148.9/sq mi (443.6/km^{2})	June 5, 1973
Pelahatchie	Town	Rankin	1,272	1,334	−4.6%	5.93	15.4	214.5/sq mi (82.8/km^{2})	March 3, 1882
Petal	City	Forrest	11,010	10,454	+5.3%	16.87	43.7	652.6/sq mi (252.0/km^{2})	February 21, 1973
Philadelphia†	City	Neshoba	7,118	7,477	−4.8%	12.21	31.6	583.0/sq mi (225.1/km^{2})	February 15, 1838
Picayune	City	Pearl River	11,885	10,878	+9.3%	12.96	33.6	917.1/sq mi (354.1/km^{2})	September 30, 1904
Pickens	Town	Holmes	920	1,157	−20.5%	1.28	3.3	718.8/sq mi (277.5/km^{2})	April 10, 1893
Pittsboro†	Village	Calhoun	157	202	−22.3%	0.98	2.5	160.2/sq mi (61.9/km^{2})	October 16, 1852
Plantersville	Town	Lee	868	1,155	−24.8%	2.09	5.4	415.3/sq mi (160.4/km^{2})	February 24, 1890
Polkville	Town	Smith	588	833	−29.4%	17.18	44.5	34.2/sq mi (13.2/km^{2})	June 6, 1969
Pontotoc†	City	Pontotoc	5,640	5,625	+0.3%	11.18	29.0	504.5/sq mi (194.8/km^{2})	May 3, 1837
Pope	Village	Panola	268	215	+24.7%	1.06	2.7	252.8/sq mi (97.6/km^{2})	April 4, 1872
Poplarville†	City	Pearl River	2,833	2,894	−2.1%	5.42	14.0	522.7/sq mi (201.8/km^{2})	March 15, 1884
Port Gibson†	City	Claiborne	1,269	1,567	−19.0%	1.76	4.6	721.0/sq mi (278.4/km^{2})	March 12, 1803
Potts Camp	Town	Marshall	416	523	−20.5%	0.97	2.5	428.9/sq mi (165.6/km^{2})	February 28, 1888
Prentiss†	Town	Jefferson Davis	976	1,081	−9.7%	1.90	4.9	513.7/sq mi (198.3/km^{2})	March 3, 1903
Puckett	Village	Rankin	342	316	+8.2%	2.17	5.6	157.6/sq mi (60.9/km^{2})	October 20, 1955
Purvis†	City	Lamar	1,909	2,175	−12.2%	3.88	10.0	492.0/sq mi (190.0/km^{2})	February 25, 1888
Quitman†	City	Clarke	2,061	2,323	−11.3%	5.18	13.4	397.9/sq mi (153.6/km^{2})	February 14, 1839
Raleigh†	Town	Smith	1,094	1,462	−25.2%	5.10	13.2	214.5/sq mi (82.8/km^{2})	July 1, 1935
Raymond†	City	Hinds	1,960	1,933	+1.4%	3.00	7.8	653.3/sq mi (252.3/km^{2})	December 15, 1830
Renova	Town	Bolivar	676	668	+1.2%	0.87	2.3	777.0/sq mi (300.0/km^{2})	July 27, 1920
Richland	City	Rankin	7,137	6,912	+3.3%	12.52	32.4	570.0/sq mi (220.1/km^{2})	October 31, 1974
Richton	Town	Perry	920	1,068	−13.9%	2.29	5.9	401.7/sq mi (155.1/km^{2})	October 14, 1905
Ridgeland	City	Madison	24,340	24,047	+1.2%	19.61	50.8	1,241.2/sq mi (479.2/km^{2})	December 29, 1899
Rienzi	Town	Alcorn	281	317	−11.4%	0.99	2.6	283.8/sq mi (109.6/km^{2})	December 14, 1859
Ripley†	City	Tippah	5,462	5,395	+1.2%	11.32	29.3	482.5/sq mi (186.3/km^{2})	May 9, 1837
Rolling Fork†	City	Sharkey	1,883	2,143	−12.1%	1.41	3.7	1,335.5/sq mi (515.6/km^{2})	March 5, 1880
Rosedale†	City	Bolivar	1,584	1,873	−15.4%	5.41	14.0	292.8/sq mi (113.0/km^{2})	February 2, 1882
Roxie	Town	Franklin	469	497	−5.6%	1.13	2.9	415.0/sq mi (160.2/km^{2})	September 6, 1911
Ruleville	City	Sunflower	2,642	3,007	−12.1%	2.52	6.5	1,048.4/sq mi (404.8/km^{2})	September 23, 1899
Sallis	Town	Attala	131	134	−2.2%	0.41	1.1	319.5/sq mi (123.4/km^{2})	March 4, 1875
Saltillo	City	Lee	4,922	4,752	+3.6%	8.19	21.2	601.0/sq mi (232.0/km^{2})	July 20, 1870
Sandersville	Town	Jones	636	731	−13.0%	4.95	12.8	128.5/sq mi (49.6/km^{2})	March 12, 1884
Sardis†	Town	Panola	1,748	1,703	+2.6%	2.00	5.2	874.0/sq mi (337.5/km^{2})	October 22, 1866
Satartia	Village	Yazoo	41	55	−25.5%	0.14	0.36	292.9/sq mi (113.1/km^{2})	February 20, 1875
Schlater	Town	Leflore	236	310	−23.9%	1.15	3.0	205.2/sq mi (79.2/km^{2})	September 23, 1968
Scooba	Town	Kemper	744	732	+1.6%	2.48	6.4	300.0/sq mi (115.8/km^{2})	April 9, 1873
Sebastopol	Town	Scott, Leake	266	272	−2.2%	1.50	3.9	177.3/sq mi (68.5/km^{2})	October 6, 1926
Seminary	Town	Covington	305	314	−2.9%	1.51	3.9	202.0/sq mi (78.0/km^{2})	November 10, 1899
Senatobia†	City	Tate	8,354	8,165	+2.3%	15.56	40.3	536.9/sq mi (207.3/km^{2})	February 10, 1860
Shannon	Town	Lee	1,496	1,753	−14.7%	4.05	10.5	432.8/sq mi (167.1/km^{2})	July 20, 1870
Shaw	City	Bolivar, Sunflower	1,457	1,952	−25.4%	1.11	2.9	1,312.6/sq mi (506.8/km^{2})	March 15, 1886
Shelby	City	Bolivar	2,021	2,229	−9.3%	2.73	7.1	740.3/sq mi (285.8/km^{2})	February 19, 1890
Sherman	Town	Lee, Pontotoc, Union	600	650	−7.7%	1.74	4.5	344.8/sq mi (133.1/km^{2})	March 3, 1888
Shubuta	Town	Clarke	406	441	−7.9%	2.41	6.2	168.5/sq mi (65.0/km^{2})	November 8, 1865
Shuqualak	Town	Noxubee	399	501	−20.4%	1.13	2.9	353.1/sq mi (136.3/km^{2})	July 16, 1859
Sidon	Town	Leflore	311	509	−38.9%	0.12	0.31	2,591.7/sq mi (1,000.6/km^{2})	April 5, 1872
Silver City	Town	Humphreys	223	337	−33.8%	0.60	1.6	371.7/sq mi (143.5/km^{2})	September 21, 1904
Silver Creek	Town	Lawrence	175	210	−16.7%	1.49	3.9	117.4/sq mi (45.3/km^{2})	May 4, 1904
Slate Springs	Village	Calhoun	105	110	−4.5%	1.42	3.7	73.9/sq mi (28.5/km^{2})	February 11, 1882
Sledge	Town	Quitman	368	545	−32.5%	0.52	1.3	707.7/sq mi (273.2/km^{2})	February 28, 1913
Smithville	Town	Monroe	509	942	−46.0%	1.48	3.8	343.9/sq mi (132.8/km^{2})	January 26, 1852
Snow Lake Shores	Town	Benton	306	319	−4.1%	0.68	1.8	450.0/sq mi (173.7/km^{2})	July 15, 1996
Soso	Town	Jones	408	408	0.0%	2.12	5.5	192.5/sq mi (74.3/km^{2})	June 28, 1901
Southaven	City	DeSoto	54,648	48,982	+11.6%	41.25	106.8	1,324.8/sq mi (511.5/km^{2})	March 25, 1980
Starkville†	City	Oktibbeha	24,360	23,888	+2.0%	25.51	66.1	954.9/sq mi (368.7/km^{2})	May 11, 1837
State Line	Town	Greene, Wayne	452	565	−20.0%	4.26	11.0	106.1/sq mi (41.0/km^{2})	February 12, 1875
Stonewall	Town	Clarke	879	1,088	−19.2%	2.66	6.9	330.5/sq mi (127.6/km^{2})	December 1, 1965
Sturgis	Town	Oktibbeha	207	254	−18.5%	1.29	3.3	160.5/sq mi (62.0/km^{2})	March 13, 1886
Summit	Town	Pike	1,505	1,705	−11.7%	2.26	5.9	665.9/sq mi (257.1/km^{2})	January 21, 1858
Sumner†	Town	Tallahatchie	278	316	−12.0%	0.55	1.4	505.5/sq mi (195.2/km^{2})	February 26, 1900
Sumrall	Town	Lamar	1,765	1,421	+24.2%	3.74	9.7	471.9/sq mi (182.2/km^{2})	October 6, 1903
Sunflower	Town	Sunflower	964	1,159	−16.8%	0.61	1.6	1,580.3/sq mi (610.2/km^{2})	February 18, 1914
Sylvarena	Village	Smith	87	112	−22.3%	2.62	6.8	33.2/sq mi (12.8/km^{2})	February 10, 1969
Taylor	Village	Lafayette	355	322	+10.2%	2.93	7.6	121.2/sq mi (46.8/km^{2})	January 23, 1907
Taylorsville	Town	Smith	1,148	1,353	−15.2%	3.86	10.0	297.4/sq mi (114.8/km^{2})	July 9, 1900
Tchula	Town	Holmes	1,652	2,096	−21.2%	1.41	3.7	1,171.6/sq mi (452.4/km^{2})	February 27, 1836
Terry	Town	Hinds	1,304	1,063	+22.7%	3.81	9.9	342.3/sq mi (132.1/km^{2})	February 19, 1867
Thaxton	Town	Pontotoc	692	643	+7.6%	10.33	26.8	67.0/sq mi (25.9/km^{2})	June 15, 1973
Tishomingo	Town	Tishomingo	370	339	+9.1%	0.55	1.4	672.7/sq mi (259.7/km^{2})	June 24, 1908
Toccopola	Town	Pontotoc	286	246	+16.3%	8.45	21.9	33.8/sq mi (13.1/km^{2})	March 31, 1873
Tremont	Town	Itawamba	467	465	+0.4%	4.91	12.7	95.1/sq mi (36.7/km^{2})	January 18, 1974
Tunica†	Town	Tunica	1,026	1,030	−0.4%	0.66	1.7	1,554.5/sq mi (600.2/km^{2})	March 3, 1888
Tupelo†	City	Lee	37,923	34,546	+9.8%	51.14	132.5	741.6/sq mi (286.3/km^{2})	July 20, 1870
Tutwiler	Town	Tallahatchie	2,476	3,550	−30.3%	1.33	3.4	1,861.7/sq mi (718.8/km^{2})	March 14, 1899
Tylertown†	Town	Walthall	1,515	1,609	−5.8%	3.28	8.5	461.9/sq mi (178.3/km^{2})	December 19, 1907
Union	Town	Neshoba, Newton	2,042	1,988	+2.7%	3.43	8.9	595.3/sq mi (229.9/km^{2})	June 19, 1905
Utica	Town	Hinds	636	820	−22.4%	2.99	7.7	212.7/sq mi (82.1/km^{2})	March 5, 1880
Vaiden†	Town	Carroll	907	734	+23.6%	2.15	5.6	421.9/sq mi (162.9/km^{2})	February 10, 1860
Vardaman	Town	Calhoun	1,110	1,316	−15.7%	1.36	3.5	816.2/sq mi (315.1/km^{2})	December 30, 1904
Verona	City	Lee	2,792	3,006	−7.1%	3.72	9.6	750.5/sq mi (289.8/km^{2})	July 18, 1860
Vicksburg†	City	Warren	21,573	23,856	−9.6%	32.98	85.4	654.1/sq mi (252.6/km^{2})	February 15, 1839
Walls (Note: The adjacent village of Memphis incorporated 1972 but did not annex the larger community of Walls until 2003 thereby giving the town of Walls the official status of a municipality.)	Town	DeSoto	1,351	1,162	+16.3%	11.84	30.7	98.1/sq mi (37.9/km^{2})	April 12, 1972
Walnut	Town	Tippah	704	771	−8.7%	5.43	14.1	129.7/sq mi (50.1/km^{2})	May 1, 1912
Walnut Grove	Town	Leake	510	1,911	−73.3%	1.62	4.2	314.8/sq mi (121.6/km^{2})	March 11, 1884
Walthall†	Village	Webster	116	144	−19.4%	0.97	2.5	119.6/sq mi (46.2/km^{2})	February 1, 1877
Water Valley†	City	Yalobusha	3,380	3,392	−0.4%	7.01	18.2	482.2/sq mi (186.2/km^{2})	April 28, 1858
Waveland	City	Hancock	7,210	6,435	+12.0%	8.49	22.0	849.2/sq mi (327.9/km^{2})	March 6, 1888
Waynesboro†	City	Wayne	4,567	5,043	−9.4%	12.69	32.9	359.9/sq mi (139.0/km^{2})	April 11, 1876
Webb	Town	Tallahatchie	416	565	−26.4%	0.42	1.1	990.5/sq mi (382.4/km^{2})	September 5, 1896
Weir	Town	Choctaw	441	459	−3.9%	1.05	2.7	420.0/sq mi (162.2/km^{2})	February 16, 1884
Wesson	Town	Copiah, Lincoln	1,833	1,925	−4.8%	4.45	11.5	411.9/sq mi (159.0/km^{2})	March 31, 1864
West	Town	Holmes	153	185	−17.3%	0.56	1.5	273.2/sq mi (105.5/km^{2})	November 3, 1865
West Point†	City	Clay	10,105	11,307	−10.6%	20.88	54.1	484.0/sq mi (186.9/km^{2})	November 20, 1858
Wiggins†	City	Stone	4,272	4,390	−2.7%	10.75	27.8	397.4/sq mi (153.4/km^{2})	March 26, 1904
Winona†	City	Montgomery	4,505	5,043	−10.7%	13.52	35.0	333.2/sq mi (128.7/km^{2})	May 2, 1861
Winstonville	Town	Bolivar	153	191	−19.9%	0.30	0.78	510.0/sq mi (196.9/km^{2})	February 16, 1917
Woodland	Village	Chickasaw	110	125	−12.0%	0.57	1.5	193.0/sq mi (74.5/km^{2})	January 30, 1908
Woodville†	Town	Wilkinson	928	1,096	−15.3%	1.04	2.7	892.3/sq mi (344.5/km^{2})	December 9, 1811
Yazoo City†	City	Yazoo	10,316	11,403	−9.5%	9.84	25.5	1,048.4/sq mi (404.8/km^{2})	March 15, 1884
Total	—	—	1,498,262	1,446,318	+3.6%	2,037.78	5,277.8	735.2/sq mi (283.9/km^{2})	—

== See also ==
- List of census-designated places in Mississippi
