= List of bridges documented by the Historic American Engineering Record in Mississippi =

This is a list of bridges documented by the Historic American Engineering Record in the U.S. state of Mississippi.

== Bridges ==
Survey No.	Name (as assigned by HAER)	Status	Type	Built	Documented	Carries	Crosses	Location	County	Coordinates
MS-3	Bay Springs Bridge	Demolished	Pratt truss	1920	1978	MS 4 (former)	Mackey's Creek	Dennis	Tishomingo	34°31′35″N 88°19′22″W
MS-5	Keystone Bridge Company Bridge	Extant	Pratt truss		1986	Fairground Street	Illinois Central Railroad	Vicksburg	Warren	32°20′16″N 90°53′26″W
MS-6	Illinois Central Gulf Railroad Bridge	Extant	Reinforced concrete open-spandrel arch		1986	Illinois Central Railroad	Big Black River	Bovina	Warren	32°20′51″N 90°42′18″W
MS-11	Bridges of the Upper Tombigbee River Valley				1978		Tombigbee River	Columbus	Lowndes	
MS-12	Steel Bridge	Replaced	Steel arch	1903	1972	Confederate Avenue	Jackson Road	Vicksburg	Warren	32°21′42″N 90°50′48″W
MS-13	Tombigbee River Bridge	Extant	Swing span	1927	1995	MS 182 (former)	Tombigbee River	Columbus	Lowndes	33°29′36″N 88°26′04″W
MS-14; MS-14-A	Vicksburg National Military Park Roads & Bridges, Melan Arch Bridges	Extant	Reinforced concrete closed-spandrel arch	1903	1997	Union Avenue	Various streams	Vicksburg	Warren	32°20′41″N 90°50′51″W
MS-14; MS-14-B	Vicksburg National Military Park Roads & Bridges, Maloney Circle Bridge	Extant	Reinforced concrete closed-spandrel arch	1908	1997	Maloney Circle	Illinois Central Railroad	Vicksburg	Warren	32°20′28″N 90°51′00″W
MS-14; MS-14-C	Vicksburg National Military Park Roads & Bridges, Halls Ferry Bridge	Extant	Reinforced concrete closed-spandrel arch	1937	1997	Confederate Avenue	Halls Ferry Road	Vicksburg	Warren	32°19′45″N 90°52′35″W
