= North Mississippi =

Region of U.S. state

Coordinates: 34.660541°N 88.485688°W

North Mississippi is a region in the northeastern portion of the U.S. state of Mississippi, consisting of Alcorn, Itawamba, Lee, Pontotoc, Prentiss, Tippah, Tishomingo, and Union counties. These counties share a unique cultural history that distinguishes them from other areas in the state of Mississippi. As of 2010, the counties have a combined population of 267,560. Tupelo is the largest city in the region, but other notable cities include Booneville, Corinth, New Albany, and Pontotoc.

The northeast Mississippi region is notable for its hilly terrain and infertile soil that made it unsuitable for cotton farming during the Antebellum period. During the American Civil War (1861–1865), northeast Mississippi was home to Southern Unionist sentiment. Woodall Mountain, the highest natural point in Mississippi, is located in the region. Dramatic poverty continued in the region until the establishment of the Tennessee Valley Authority in 1933. Growth in the manufacturing sector during the 1950s and 1960s provided an economic boom to the region, and today North Mississippi benefits from the presence of a large health service industry centered on Tupelo.

The region is among the most ancestrally Democratic-voting and socially conservative in Mississippi, often sending Blue Dog Democrats to the state legislature and United States Congress. Democrat Jamie L. Whitten served North Mississippi in the House of Representatives from 1941 to 1995, and Travis Childers served as its Congressman from 2008 to 2011. The area is represented in the House by Trent Kelly (a Republican from Saltillo) as part of Mississippi's 1st congressional district. As of 2018, the region was home to Mississippi's senior US Senator Roger Wicker (a Republican from Pontotoc). An example of the region's staunch social conservatism is in the results of the 2004 Mississippi Amendment 1 banning same-sex marriage: the five counties most supportive of the measure (out of the state's 82 in all) were in North Mississippi, and all eight of the region's counties were over 90% in favor.
