= List of state highways in Mississippi (700–799) =

The following is a list of state highways in Mississippi between the numbers 700 and 799.

== MS 702 ==
Mississippi Highway 702
- Length: 0.255 mi (410 m)

Mississippi Highway 702 (MS 702) is a short unsigned highway located in Michigan City, Mississippi, connecting MS 7 to Jackson Avenue.

The entire length of MS 702 is only 0.3 miles (0.48 km). It begins as a spur off of Mississippi Highway 7 heading east, also known as Main Street. Then, MS 702 crosses two tracks of the Mississippi Central Railroad. MS 702 then turns abruptly south and becomes Fort Street. MS 702 ends at a T-junction at Jackson Avenue.

== MS 713 ==
Mississippi Highway 713
- Length: 7.085 mi (11.402 km)

Mississippi Highway 713 (MS 713) is a spur route in northwestern Mississippi that carries traffic between the relocated MS 304 and U.S. Route 61 (US 61), serving as a bypass of the northern section of Tunica Resorts for traffic headed to the Casino Strip Resorts, the town of Tunica, and destinations further south along US 61.

The northern portion of MS 713 runs mostly north–south, coinciding with Interstate 69 (I-69) and is a freeway constructed to Interstate highway standards; it opened to traffic December 18, 2006. The remainder of the route replaces the former route of MS 304 between U.S. 61 and Banks, Mississippi, is a five-lane undivided highway with a center turn lane, and runs east–west.

The portion of MS 713 in Tunica County was designated as the Martin Luther King Jr. Memorial Highway by the Mississippi Legislature in 2003.

Junction list

County	Location	mi	km	Destinations	Notes
Tunica	Tunica Resorts	0.0	0.0	US 61 – Tunica, Walls	Southern terminus
Tunica	Banks	4.0	6.4	MS 3	
Tunica		4.9	7.9	Old Highway 304 east – Eudora, Hernando	Former MS 304; south end of freeway
Tunica		5.2	8.4	I-69 begins	Southern end of I-69 overlap
DeSoto		8.3	13.4	I-69 north / MS 304 east	Northern terminus of MS 713, end overlap with I-69
1.000 mi = 1.609 km; 1.000 km = 0.621 mi: Concurrency terminus

== MS 760 ==
Mississippi Highway 760
- Length: 1.63 mi (2.62 km)

Mississippi Highway 760 (MS 760) is a 1.63-mile-long (2.62 km) state highway in Tishomingo County, Mississippi. It connects the towns of Belmont and Golden.

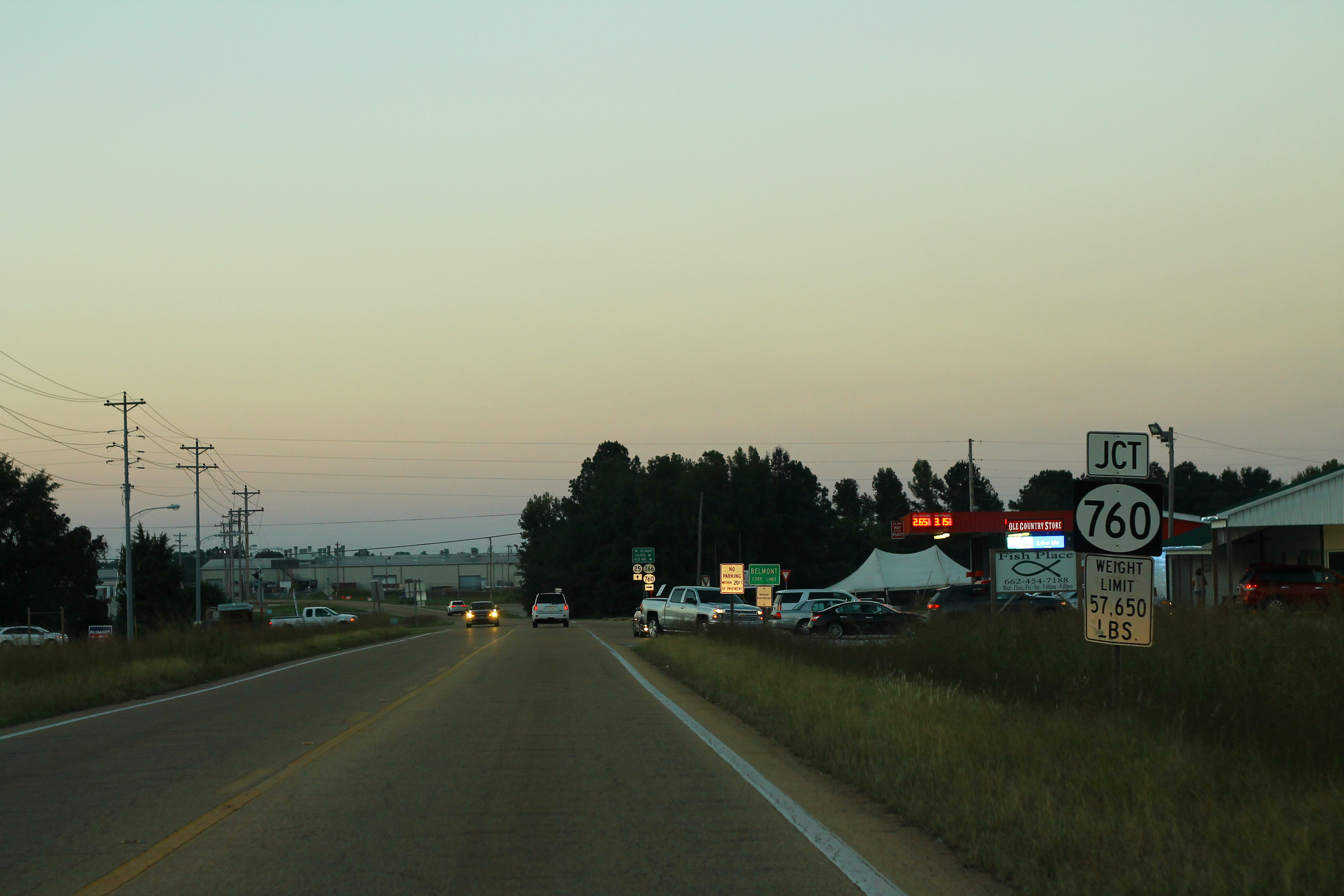
MS 25 at its junction with MS 760

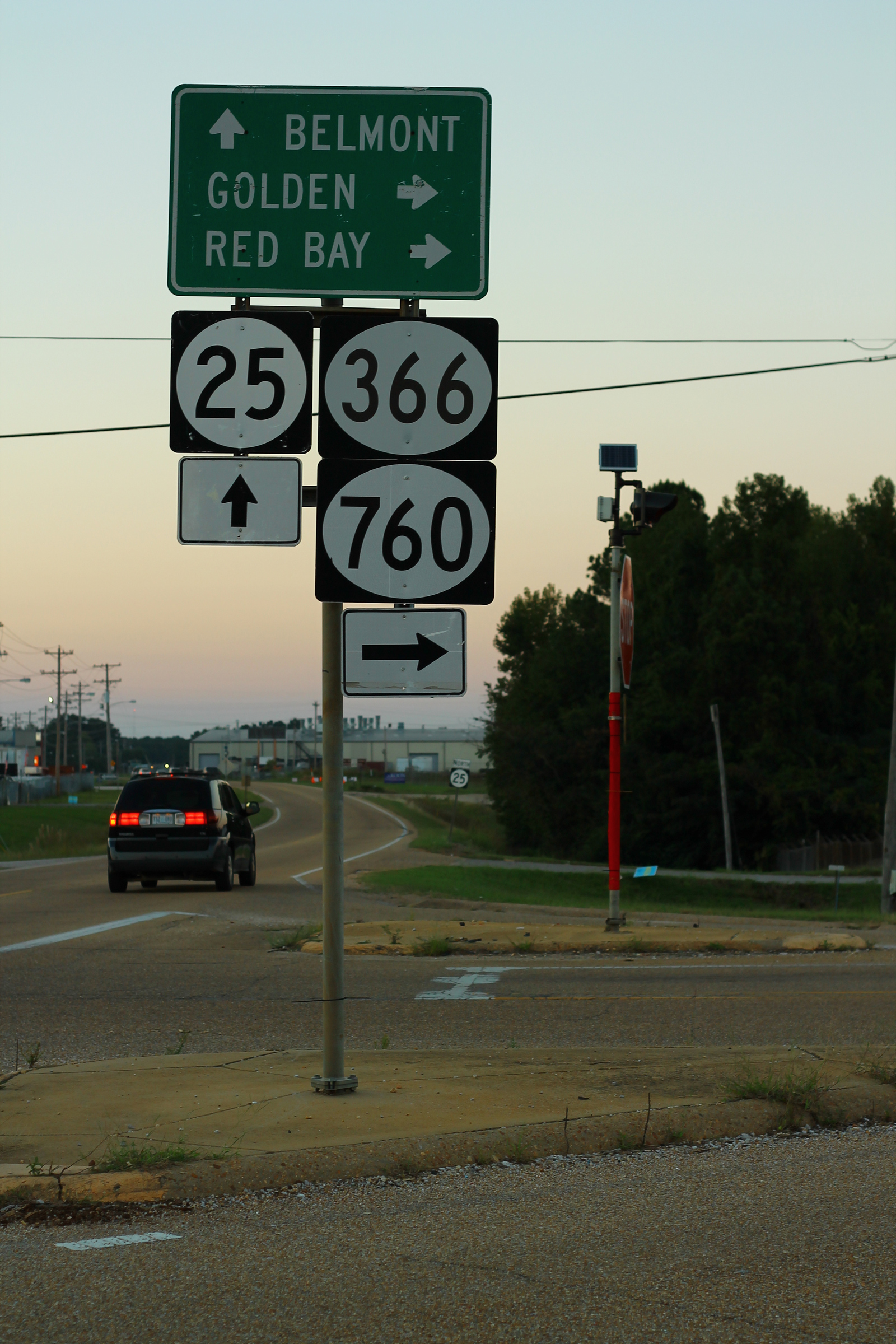
MS 25-MS 760 intersection in Belmont

MS 760 begins at an intersection with MS 25 (2nd Street) at the southern edge of Belmont. It heads east through rural farmland before curving to the north to enter Golden and pass northward through an industrial area. The highway passes through neighborhoods along Main Street before entering downtown and curving to the east along Stanphill Street. MS 760 comes to an end shortly thereafter at an intersection with MS 366 (Front Street/Red Bay Road). The entire route of MS 760 is a two-lane highway.

== MS 766 ==
Mississippi Highway 766
- North Third Avenue
- Length: 1.242 mi (1.999 km)
- Existed: 1998–present

Mississippi Highway 766 (MS 766) is a short highway in Saltillo, Mississippi. The route starts at MS 363, and travels north around Saltillo. MS 766 ends at MS 145 in the northern part of the town. The route was created around 1998, and has not changed significantly since.

All of the route is in Lee County. MS 766 starts at MS 363 in downtown Saltillo, and travels north. The road, known as North Third Avenue, goes through residential areas inside the town. Just past Cemetery Road, a side road providing access to Lake Lamar Bruce, MS 766 turns northwest towards MS 145. The street intersects a few more driveways and small streets before ending at MS 145. The road continues on as North 3rd Avenue.

In 2013, Mississippi Department of Transportation (MDOT) calculated as many as 2,000 vehicles traveling north of East Water Street. MS 766 is not included as a part of the National Highway System. MS 766 is legally defined in Mississippi Code § 65-3-3, and is maintained by MDOT.

MS 766 was constructed in 1998, from MS 363 to MS 145. No significant changes have been made to the road since.

== MS 773 ==
Mississippi Highway 773
- Joe Mitch McElwain Memorial Highway
- Length: 1.935 mi (3.114 km)
- Existed: May 27, 2004–present

Mississippi Highway 773 (MS 773) is a short highway in northern Mississippi. The route starts at MS 2, where it travels northwestward. MS 773 soon ends at County Road 500 (CR 500), and continues as CR 549. MS 773 was designated on May 27, 2004, and has not changed significantly since.

All of the route is in Tippah County, and is maintained by the Mississippi Department of Transportation (MDOT). MS 773 starts at MS 2 at a T-intersection and travels northwestward. The route soon enters a forest, with small patches of grass. East of CR 567, MS 773 begins curving west. The road soon travels north again and intersects CR 500, MS 773's northern terminus. The road continues as CR 549. MS 773 is not included as a part of the National Highway System. The route is legally defined in Mississippi Code § 65-3-3, and is also designated as "Joe Mitch McElwain Memorial Highway".

MS 773 was designated on May 27, 2004, after House Bill 1215 passed. The route was designated from MS 2 to CR 500. The route was also given the designation "Joe Mitch McElwain Memorial Highway" on the same day.

== MS 780 ==
Mississippi Highway 780
- Magnolia Way
- Length: 5.127 mi (8.251 km)
- Existed: August 24, 2009–present

Magnolia Way, officially designated as Mississippi Highway 780 (MS 780), is a short unsigned state highway in northeastern Mississippi. The road starts at County Road 203 (CR 203), and travels southeastward as a frontage road of the concurrence of Interstate 22 (I-22) and U.S. Route 78 (US 78). It intersects the entrance of the Toyota Motor Manufacturing Mississippi (TMMMS), located near Blue Springs. Magnolia Way ends at its intersection with MS 9 south of Sherman. Construction of the road began in 2007 to serve TMMMS, and it opened on August 24, 2009, two years before the manufacturing plant opened.

== MS 782 ==
Mississippi Highway 782
- Main Street
- Length: .218 mi (351 m)

Mississippi Highway 782 (MS 782) is a .218-mile-long (0.351 km) state highway located in the U.S. State of Mississippi. Located entirely within Mantee in Webster County, the western terminus of the route is at the western terminus of MS 46, where it continues as Main Street and the eastern terminus is at MS 15. Unlike most of the Mississippi Highways numbered between 701 and 992, MS 782 is signed.

MS 782 starts at a three-way intersection with MS 46 on the west side of Mantee. Continuing as Main Street from MS 46, the road intersects Skelton Street. The street then intersects three driveways and ends at an intersection with MS 15.

== MS 791 ==
Mississippi Highway 791
- Airport Road
- Length: 3.671 mi (5.908 km)
- Existed: 2008–present

Mississippi Highway 791 (MS 791) is a short highway in eastern Mississippi. The southern terminus is at Artesia Road, and travels near the Golden Triangle Regional Airport. The highway continues to its northern terminus is at U.S. Route 82. The road was constructed in 1998, and was designated MS 791 in 2008.

All of the route is located in Lowndes County. In 2013, Mississippi Department of Transportation (MDOT) calculated as many as 4,200 vehicles traveling north of the entrance to the airport. MS 791 is not included as a part of the National Highway System. The route is not legally defined in Mississippi Code § 65-3-3, and is maintained by MDOT.

MS 791 starts at Artesia Road, near the unincorporated community of Billups. The divided highway then travels north along the small area of grassland. About one mi (1.6 km) later, MS 791 intersects a road leading to a factory and soon meets the entrance to the airport terminal. The highway continues north to Industrial Park Road, where MS 789 ends. Just past Charlie D. Ford Drive, MS 791 shifts slightly to its east, intersecting South Frontage Road. It then continues to its northern terminus of US 82 at a diamond interchange. The road shortly ends at North Frontage Road.

A road first appeared in maps in 1998, connecting from Artesia Road to US 82. The northern section of it became state maintained in 2001, as Industrial Park Road was constructed. The road became designated as MS 791 in 2008, the same time as MS 789. MS 791 was rerouted slightly and became a divided highway by 2010.

Junction list

The entire route is in Lowndes County.

Location	mi	km	Destinations	Notes
	0.000	0.000	Artesia Road	Southern terminus
	1.170	1.883	Golden Triangle Regional Airport	
	1.954	3.145	MS 789 (Industrial Park Road)	Western terminus of MS 789
	3.368– 3.642	5.420– 5.861	US 82 (MS 12) – West Point, Starkville, Columbus	Diamond interchange
	3.671	5.908	North Frontage Road	Northern terminus
1.000 mi = 1.609 km; 1.000 km = 0.621 mi

== MS 792 ==
Mississippi Highway 792
- Length: 13.216 mi (21.269 km)
- Existed: 1998–present

Mississippi Highway 792 (MS 792) is a road in eastern Mississippi. It starts at U.S. Route 45 (US 45), and travels east. Near halfway of the route, SR 792 turns south and continues to its eastern terminus at MS 388. The highway was designated in 1998, and no major changes have been made since.
