= Mississippi Highway 364 =

Highway in Mississippi

Mississippi Highway 364
- MS 364 highlighted in red Former segment highlighted in blue

Route information
- Maintained by MDOT
- Length: 16.326 mi (26.274 km)
- Existed: 1950–present

Western segment
- Length: 11.6 mi (18.7 km)
- West end: MS 30 near Booneville
- East end: MS 365 in Cairo

Eastern segment
- Length: 4.7 mi (7.6 km)
- West end: Holcut Memorial Park
- East end: MS 25 in Midway

Location
- Country: United States
- State: Mississippi
- Counties: Prentiss, Tishomingo

Highway system
- Mississippi State Highway System; Interstate; US; State
← MS 363	→ MS 365

Mississippi Highway 364 (MS 364) is a state highway in northeastern Mississippi, separated in two segments. The route starts at MS 30 southeast of Booneville and travels northeastward. The road travels through Altitude and ends at MS 365 in Cairo. The other segment begins in Holcut and travels eastward to its terminus at MS 25 at Midway. The route was designated in 1950, from a former segment of MS 30 between MS 365 and MS 25. The route was extended southwestwards to MS 30 around 1960, and the highway was completely paved by 1984. The section of MS 364 near the Tennessee–Tombigbee Waterway were removed by the same year, and another section from MS 365 to the waterway was removed ten years later.

== Route description ==
Traffic volume on Mississippi Highway 364
Location	Volume
Northeast of CO 1225	1,800
Northeast of CO 1321	1,300
West of CO 961	50
East of CO 148	360
Data was measured in 2017 in terms of AADT; Source: Mississippi Department of Transportation

MS 364 is split in two segments, with one located in eastern Prentiss County, and the other in western Tishomingo County. The route is legally defined in Mississippi Code § 65-3-3, and all of it is maintained by the Mississippi Department of Transportation (MDOT), as part of the Mississippi State Highway System. In 2014, the section of MS 364 from County Road 2201 (CO 2201) to MS 365 was designated as the "Oliver Wendell Pinson Memorial Highway."

Southeast of Booneville, the western segment of MS 364 starts at the three-way junction at MS 30 and travels northward. The route turns northeastward at CO 3121, and intersects CO 130 at an all-way stop. In a forested area, MS 364 crosses Martin Creek past CO 1219 and Thompson Branch north of CO 2060. The route enters the unincorporated community of Altitude at its intersection with CO 2371 and CO 1371, and it crosses Big Brown Creek east of CO 1301. The road travels over the Blue Hill near CO 2180, and it begins to turn eastward at CO 1401 and CO 2201. East of CO 1451, the route crosses over Clausel Creek, and the western segment of MS 364 ends at MS 365 in Cairo.

The former segment of MS 364, no longer maintained by MDOT, still exists in Prentiss and Tishomingo counties. Currently, the road continues eastward from the intersection of MS 364 and MS 365, and crosses Yellow Creek near CO 1471. It bends southward near CO 1481 and crosses the county line into Tishomingo County east of CO 2391. The road, now known as CO 130, intersects CO 131 just past the county line and crosses the Redmont Railway. CO 130 travels eastward, intersecting CO 137, and ends near the Tennessee–Tombigbee Waterway, across from Holcut.

In Holcut, the eastern segment of MS 364 begins at the entrance of the Holcut Memorial Park. The road soon turns southeastward in the forested area, and intersects a road leading to the Divide Overlook Area. The route turns northeastward past the intersection, meeting CO 961, which travels to Paden. MS 364 crosses Cripple Deer Creek near CO 129 and turns east past CO 148. The road ends at a three-way junction with MS 25 in Midway.

== History ==
The gravel road that became part of MS 364 has existed since 1928, and it was designated as part of MS 30 by 1936. Around five years later, MS 30 was rerouted to a road south of it, and its old alignment was renumbered to MS 32. In 1942, the designations were reversed, with MS 30 on the northern route, and MS 32 on the southern one. The next year, MS 30's designation was reverted to the ones in 1941, while MS 32's designation was removed. In 1950, MS 364 was designated, connecting from MS 365 to MS 25. In October 1958, a project to grade and build drainage, culverts, and bridges from Cairo to Midway was started. It was finished by 1960, already paved in asphalt. The route was also extended southwestward to MS 30 in gravel. By 1974, a small segment east of MS 365 was realigned northward. Three years later, a small section of MS 364 from MS 30 to Altitude was paved, after being proposed one year earlier. All of MS 364 became paved by 1984. A small part of the route, along with the town of Holcut, was removed east of MS 365, as the Tennessee–Tombigbee Waterway was constructed through it by 1985, leaving MS 364 in two sections. The segment east of MS 365 was removed from the state highway system in 1994, and the route was realigned northward west of MS 365 two years later. In September 2011, MS 30 was rerouted to a new bypass south of Booneville, and MS 364 was connected to the bypass.

== Major intersections ==
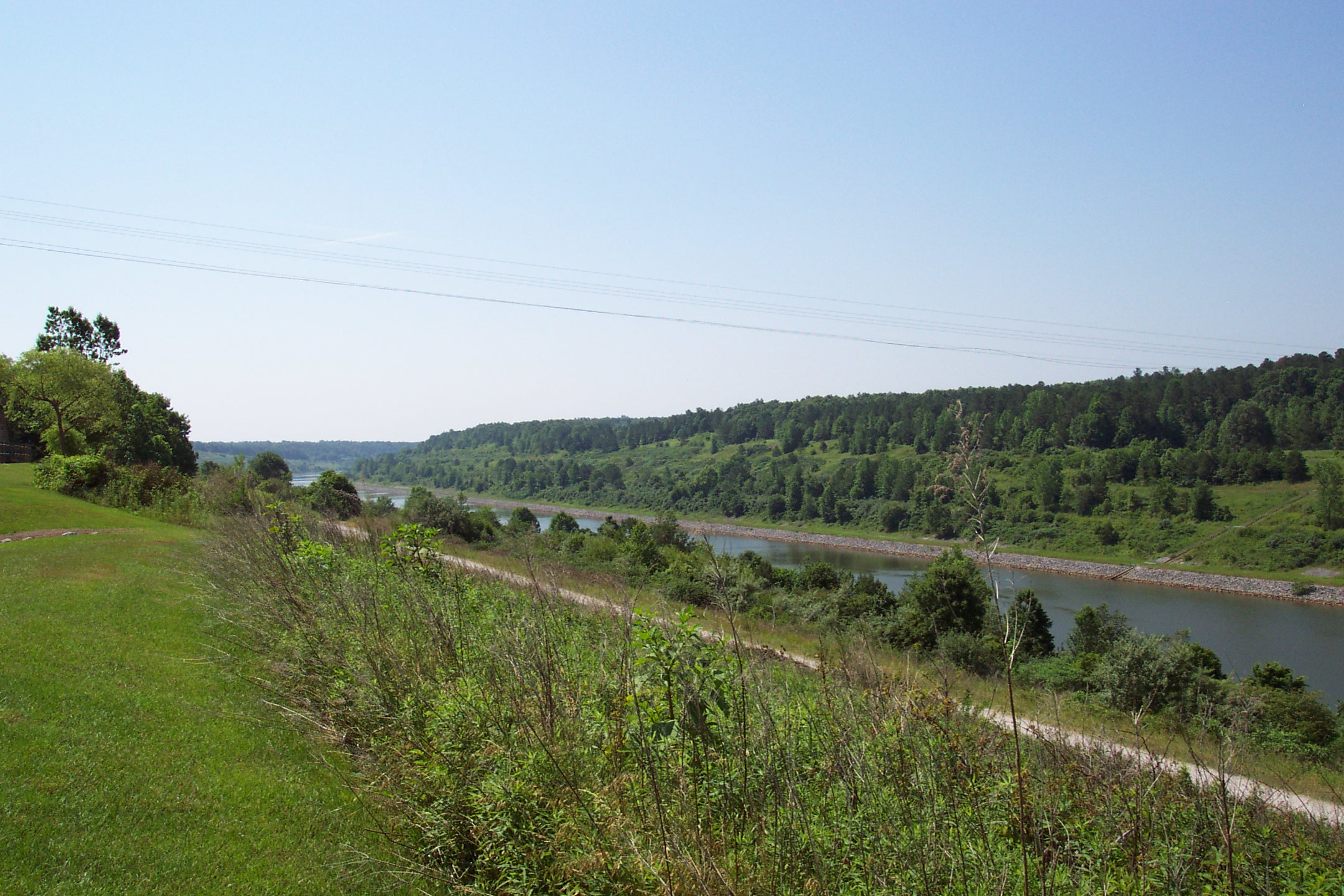
Former site of Holcut, Mississippi

County	Location	mi	km	Destinations	Notes
Prentiss		0.0	0.0	MS 30	Western terminus
Prentiss	Cairo	11.6	18.7	MS 365	Road continues as an unnumbered county road
Gap in route
Tishomingo	Holcut	11.6	18.7	Holcut Memorial Park	Pavement continues from Tennessee–Tombigbee Waterway
Tishomingo	Midway	16.3	26.2	MS 25	Eastern terminus
1.000 mi = 1.609 km; 1.000 km = 0.621 mi

== See also ==
- List of Mississippi state highways
