= Mississippi Highway 25 =

Highway in Mississippi

Mississippi Highway 25
- MS 25 highlighted in red, unsigned extensions near I-22 highlighted in blue

Route information
- Maintained by MDOT
- Length: 260.816 mi (419.743 km)
- Existed: 1932–present

Major junctions
- South end: I-55 in Jackson
- US 82 in Starkville; US 45 Alt. in West Point; US 45 in Aberdeen; US 278 in Amory; I-22 / US 78 in Fulton; US 72 in Iuka
- North end: SR 57 near North Crossroads

Location
- Country: United States
- State: Mississippi
- Counties: Hinds, Rankin, Leake, Attala, Winston, Oktibbeha, Lowndes, Clay, Monroe, Itawamba, Tishomingo

Highway system
- Mississippi State Highway System; Interstate; US; State
← MS 24	→ MS 26

Mississippi Highway 25 (MS 25) runs from I-55 in Jackson, Mississippi to the Tennessee state line north of Iuka. The part from Jackson to Starkville (which is a four-lane divided expressway) connects the state capital with the main campus of Mississippi State University.

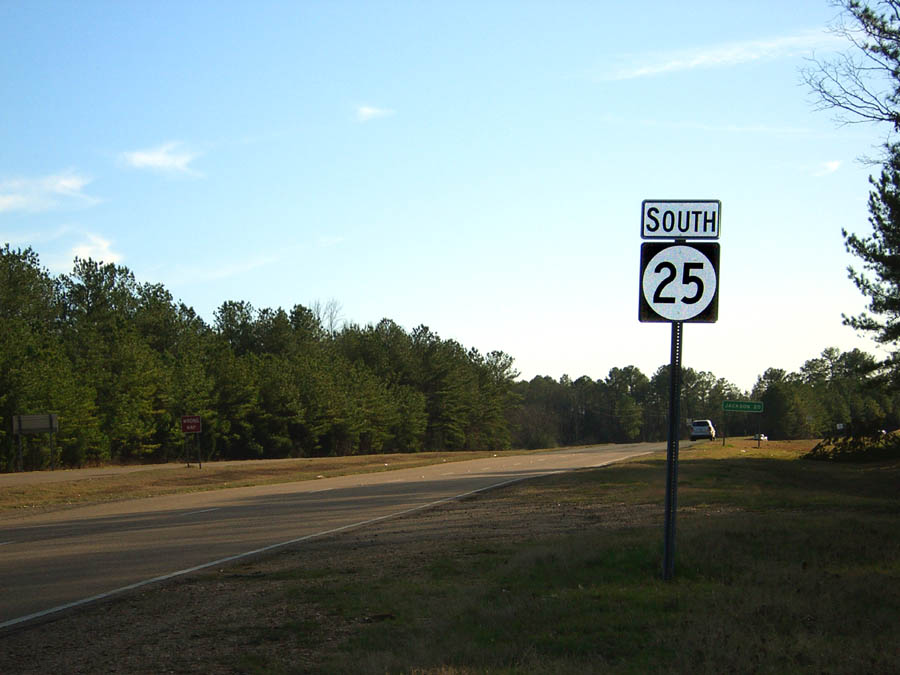
MS 25 as it runs through Rankin County, north of Jackson.

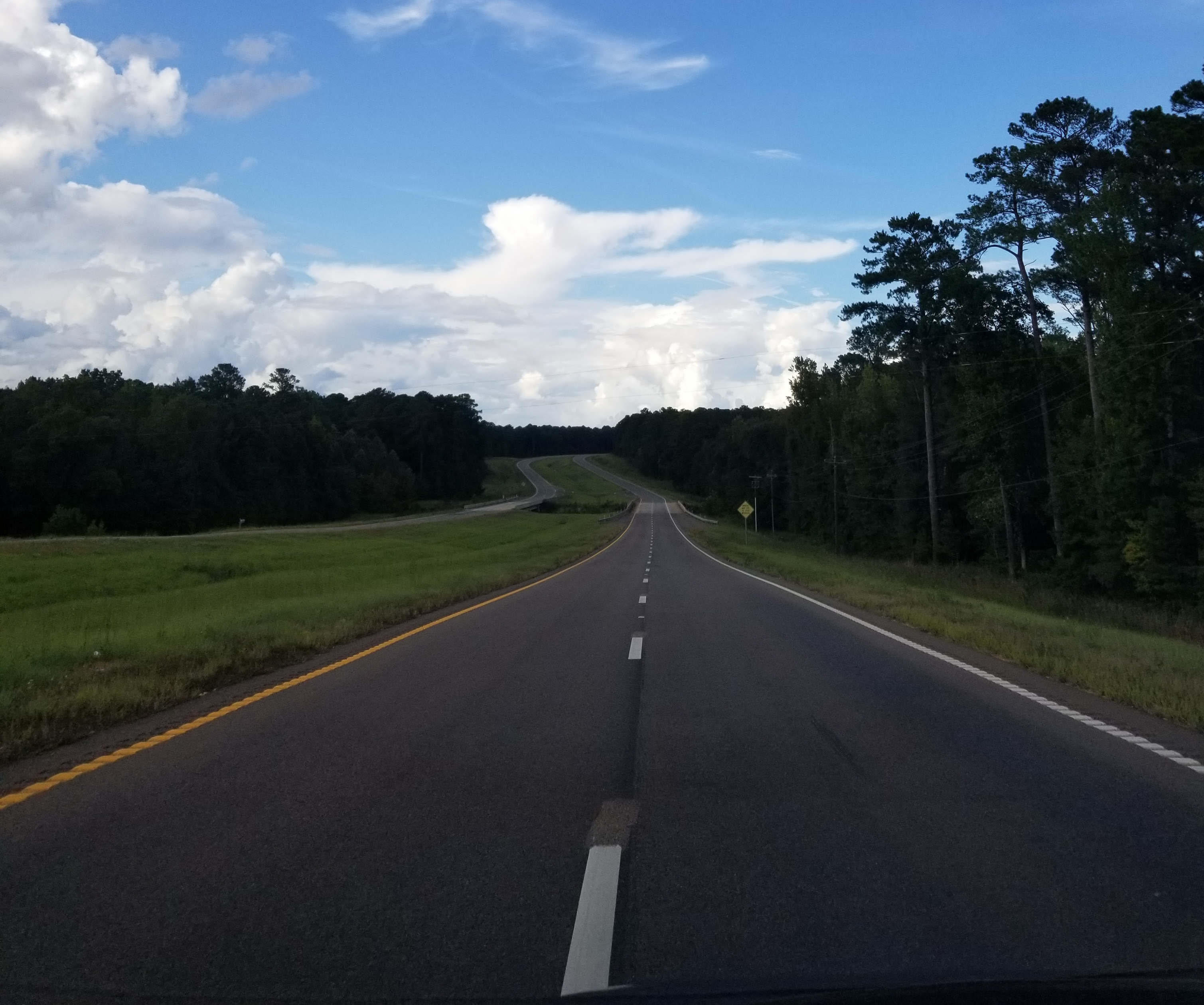
MS 25 looking north in Winston County

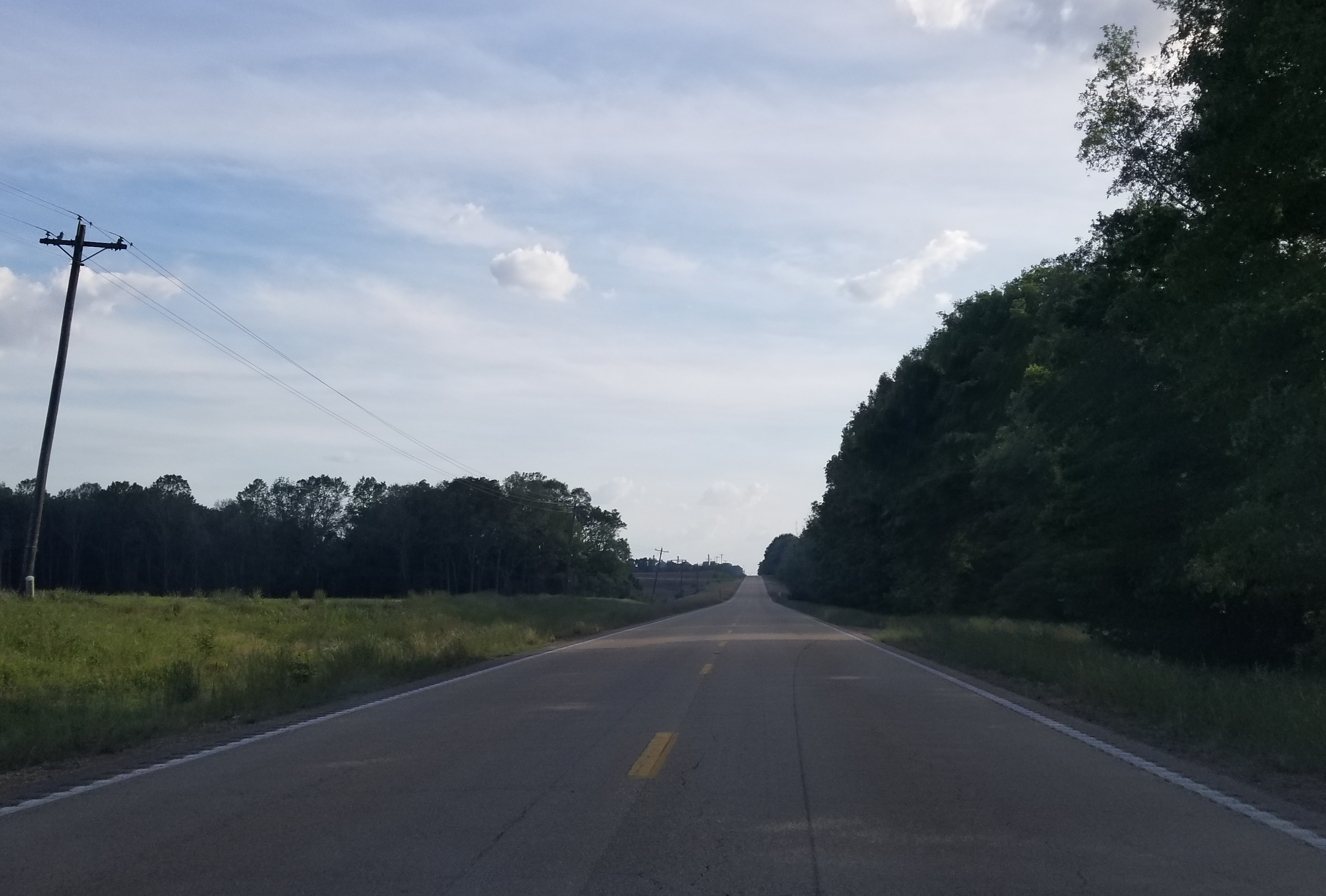
MS 25 in Monroe County between West Point and Aberdeen

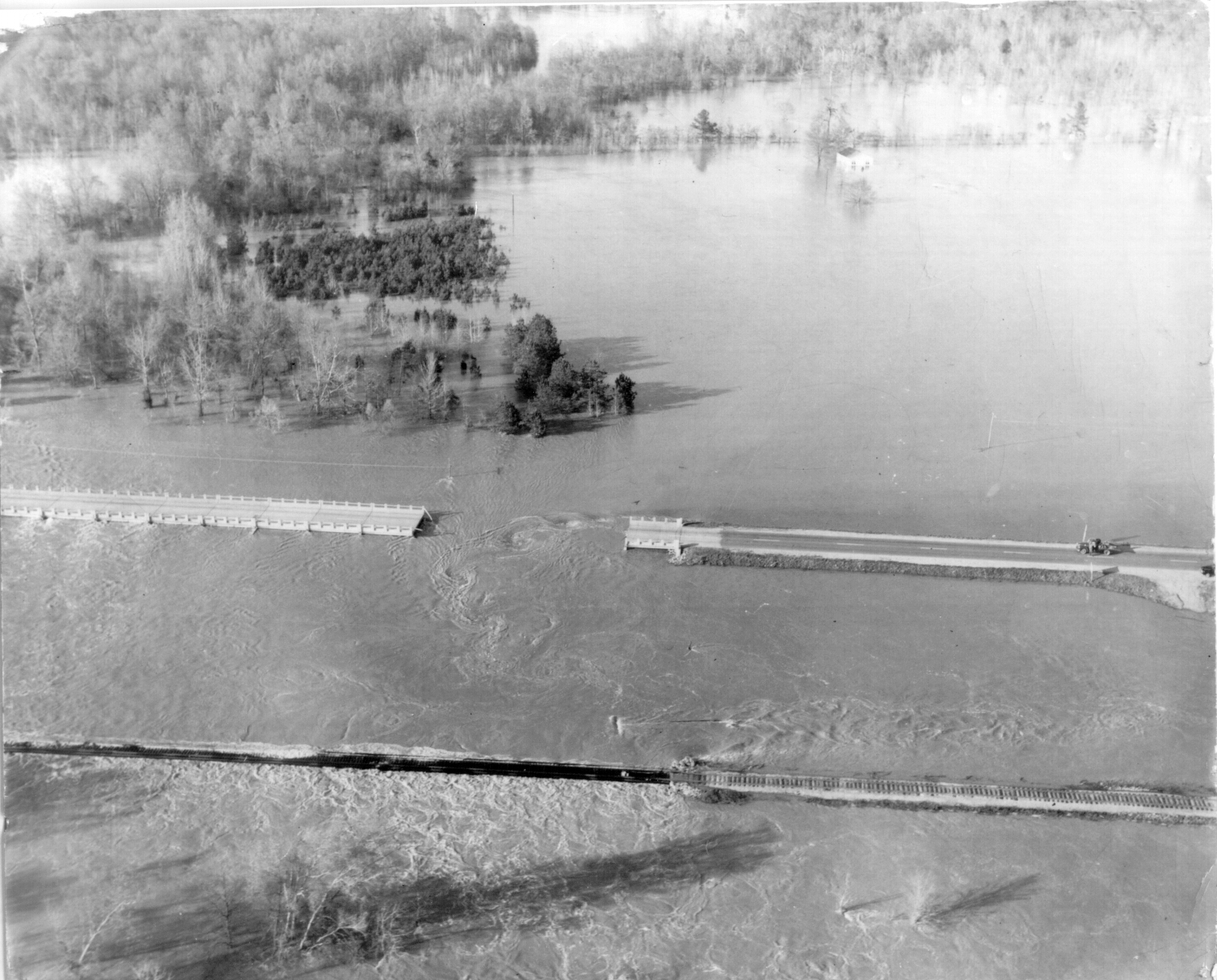
Failure of the Mississippi Highway 25 N/U.S. Route 45 S bridge over the Tombigbee River relief (Big Nichols Creek)/Tennessee-Tombigbee Waterway in Aberdeen, Mississippi, during the March 1955 floods.

== Route description ==
=== Jackson to Starkville ===
MS 25 starts at an interchange with I-55 (Exit 98B) in Jackson with the name Lakeland Drive. The highway shortly passes through eastern Jackson. The highway eventually crosses the Pearl River, entering Rankin County and the city of Flowood.

In Flowood, the highway travels east and serves a major business corridor. MS 25 intersects MS 475 (Airport Road) and travels a few miles north of the Jackson-Medgar Wiley Evers International Airport. The highway shortens from six to four lanes on the outskirts of the city and interchanges MS 471. MS 25 continues north through exurban areas, having an interchange with MS 43 in Sand Hill. The highway shortly passes through Scott County and then enters Leake County.

In Leake County, MS 25 travels through rural forests and small residential areas. Along the way, the route intersects MS 13 before crossing the Pearl River once more. Soon after, the highway interchanges MS 16 and bypasses the city of Carthage. A few miles ahead, MS 25 intersects MS 429 (Red Dog Rd.) and has an interchange with MS 35 shortly after. The highway continues through rural Leake County before entering Attala County and almost immediately entering into Winston County.

The highway quickly interchanges MS 19 and travels through forests for many miles, eventually reaching Louisville. In the city, MS 25 meets MS 15 at a Trumpet interchange, beginning a concurrency. The two travel through the western side of town, encountering a few businesses and intersecting MS 14. The concurrency ends at an interchange where MS 25 exits to the north. The route takes a windy path through the Tombigbee National Forest for several miles before entering Oktibbeha County.

=== Starkville to Tennessee ===
The highway travels north through rural forests before entering Starkville. MS 25 bypasses the city to the west and has an interchange with MS 12. Shortly after, the highway has an interchange with US 82 and joins the route, going eastbound. The two routes continue as a Controlled-access highway on the north side of Starkville along with an interchange with MS 389 and another one with MS 12, with the highway joining the concurrency with MS 25 and US 82. The three routes continue through Oktibbeha County before entering Lowndes County

The three routes have an interchange with US 45 Alt., with MS 25 joining the highway north. The two routes quickly enter Clay County and travel through forests, crossing Tibbee Creek along the way. The two highways eventually enter West Point and serves as the main business corridor. MS 25 and US 45 Alt. intersect MS 50 (Main St.) and continues north out of the city. Soon after, the two routes enter Monroe County and shortly thereafter have an interchange where MS 25 exits off of US 45 Alt, heading northeast as a two-lane highway. The highway travels through fields for several miles before intersecting US 45 and joining the route southbound, along with MS 8. The three routes run along the south side of Aberdeen and exits the city after crossing the Tennessee-Tombigbee Waterway. After crossing the waterway, MS 25 and MS 8 split off from US 45 at a trumpet interchange. MS 8 leaves MS 25 at an intersection shortly after. MS 25 travels north for several miles, passing through Becker and soon afterwards, intersecting US 278 and joins the highway to head towards central Armory. MS 25 eventually turns on to S Main St. and passes through downtown. North of downtown, the highway intersects MS 6 and continues north as Highland Dr. The route curves northeast to head out of Amory. Outside of Amory, the highway parallels the Tennessee-Tombigbee Waterway, traveling through residential areas. The highway passes through Smithville before entering Itawamba County.

MS 25 takes a windy path through rural forests and hilly terrain for many miles before entering Fulton. The road widens to four lanes and has interchange with I-22 and US 78 (Exit 104), joining the two in a concurrency eastbound. A few miles ahead, MS 25 exits off at an interchange (Exit 108) and heads north as a four-lane divided highway. The route has an intersection with MS 178 a few miles north and eventually comes to an intersection with the newly built MS 76, where MS 25 turns left and quickly dies down to a two lane road. The highway winds its way through thick forests for several miles before entering Tishomingo County

The route quickly enters the town of Belmont and passes through the town as 2nd St. The highway continues through residential areas and shortly after enters Dennis, where MS 25 and MS 4 intersection. The road travels north through forests and intersects the Natchez Trace Parkway. The highway eventually passes through Tishomingo and intersects MS 30 north of town. MS 25 goes through rural areas and communities before reaching Iuka. Here the highway widens to four lanes and interchanges US 72. MS 25 mostly bypasses the town to the west and shortens to two lanes once outside of the town. The road starts to head northwest through many forests while crossing a bridge over the Tennessee-Tombigbee Waterway. MS 25 passes through small communities near the waterway and intersects MS 350. Soon after, the highway crosses over a small bay and enters Hardin County, Tennessee as TN State Route 57.

== History ==
The 1933 Road Map of Mississippi shows MS 25 running northward from Macon roughly along the 2019 alignment of U.S. Route 45 to Brooksville, then roughly along the 2019 alignment of U.S. Route 45 Alternate through Artesia and West Point to Muldon, where the 2019 alignment continues in a northeasterly direction.

A 7.6 mile stretch of MS 25 between Muldon and Aberdeen was built in 1967 over the former railroad branch of the Mobile and Ohio Railroad, which was originally built in 1870.

As of June 28, 2006, 150 miles (240 km) of continuous four-lane divided highway is open between Starkville, Mississippi, and Jackson, Mississippi. The last leg to open was the 11.9-mile (19.2 km), $27-million section from the intersection of Highway 19 north of Louisville, Mississippi, to Noxapater Creek in Winston County. This is one of the culminations of the 1987 Four-Lane Highway Program (commonly referred to as AHEAD Program) for improving Mississippi roadways.

On May 10, 2006, the next-to-last leg, a 10.1-mile (16.3 km), $23-million section, opened from the Oktibbeha County line west into Winston County.

Legally, Mississippi 25 is defined in Mississippi Code Annotated § 65-3-3, as follows: "Begins at or near Jackson, Hinds County, thence in a northeasterly direction to or near Carthage, Louisville and Starkville, thence along U.S. 82 to its intersection with U.S. 45A, thence along U.S. 45A to Muldon, thence to or near Aberdeen, Amory, Smithville, to U.S. 78, thence continuing to Belmont, Dennis, Tishomingo, Iuka and to the Mississippi-Tennessee state line north of Cross Roads, Tishomingo County."

== Major intersections ==
County	Location	mi	km	Destinations	Notes
Hinds	Jackson	0.0	0.0	I-55 / Lakeland Drive west – McComb, Grenada	I-55 exit 98B; Southern terminus
Hinds	Jackson	0.8	1.3	Lakeland Terrace - LeFleur's Bluff State Park	Access road into park
Rankin	Flowood	2.7	4.3	MS 477 south (Treetops Boulevard)	Northern terminus of unsigned MS 477
Rankin	Flowood	4.4	7.1	MS 475 south to I-20 – USPFO, International Airport	Northern terminus of MS 475
Rankin		12.3	19.8	MS 471 south / MS 471 Bus. north – Brandon	Interchange; south end of MS 471 overlap; southern terminus of MS 471 Bus; south end of expressway
Rankin		19.5	31.4	MS 471 north – Goshen Springs	Interchange; north end of MS 471 overlap
Rankin	Koch	22.0	35.4	MS 43 – Canton, Sand Hill	Interchange
Leake		34.4	55.4	To MS 483 south – Leake County Water Park, Ludlow, Ross Barnett Reservoir Low Head Dam	
Leake		42.3	68.1	MS 13 south – Lena, Morton	Northern terminus of MS 13
Leake	Wiggins, Leake County	45.3	72.9	MS 16 – Canton, Carthage	Interchange
Leake		50.6	81.4	To MS 429 – Thomastown	
Leake	Carthage	58.1	93.5	MS 35 – Kosciusko, Carthage	Interchange
Leake		72.6	116.8	Remus Road	Proposed MS 427
Winston	Four Corners	77.1	124.1	MS 19 – Kosciusko, Philadelphia, Meridian	Interchange
Winston	Louisville	97.7	157.2	MS 15 south – Philadelphia	Interchange; south end of MS 15 overlap
Winston	Louisville	98.6	158.7	MS 14 – Kosciusko, Downtown Louisville, Macon	
Winston		100.8	162.2	MS 15 north / MS 758 west – Ackerman, Mathiston	Interchange; north end of MS 15 overlap; eastern terminus of MS 758
Oktibbeha	Starkville	130.7	210.3	MS 12 – Starkville, Ackerman, Mississippi State University	Interchange
Oktibbeha	Starkville	132.1	212.6	MS 182 – West Starkville	Interchange
Oktibbeha	Starkville	132.7	213.6	US 82 west – Winona	Interchange; south end of US 82 overlap; south end of freeway; north end of expressway
Oktibbeha	Starkville	134	216	MS 389 – Downtown Starkville	
Oktibbeha		136.1	219.0	MS 12 west – Starkville, Mississippi State University	South end of MS 12 overlap
Oktibbeha		140	230	MS 182 – Clayton Village, Starkville	
Oktibbeha		142.6	229.5	Hickory Grove Road	
Lowndes		144.3	232.2	US 82 east / MS 12 east / US 45 Alt. south – Columbus, Meridian	Interchange; north end of US 82 overlap; south end of US 45 Alt. overlap; north end of freeway
Clay	West Point	152.6	245.6	MS 50 – Downtown West Point, Waverley Plantation	
Monroe		160.3	258.0	US 45 Alt. north – Okolona, Tupelo	Interchange; north end of US 45 Alt. overlap
Monroe		168.4	271.0	MS 382 west – Prairie	Eastern terminus of MS 382
Monroe	Aberdeen	169.9	273.4	US 45 north / MS 8 west – Tupelo	South end of US 45 / MS 8 overlap
Monroe	Aberdeen	172.1	277.0	MS 145 north – Aberdeen	Southern terminus of MS 145
Monroe	Aberdeen	174.3	280.5	US 45 south – Columbus	Interchange; north end of US 45 overlap
Monroe		175.4	282.3	MS 8 east – Gattman	North end of MS 8 overlap
Monroe	Amory	186.1	299.5	US 278 east	South end of US 278 overlap
Monroe	Amory	187.7	302.1	US 278 west – Tupelo	North end of US 278 overlap
Monroe	Amory	188.8	303.8	MS 6 west – Nettleton	Eastern terminus of MS 6
Monroe	Smithville	197.2	317.4	MS 23 north	Southern terminus of MS 23
Itawamba	Fulton	210.8	339.2	I-22 west / US 78 west – Tupelo, Downtown Fulton, Jamie L. Whitten Historical Center, Itawamba Community College	South end of I-22 / US 78 overlap; MS 25 south follows exit 104
Itawamba		215.8	347.3	I-22 east / US 78 east – Birmingham	North end of I-22 / US 78 overlap; MS 25 north follows exit 108
Itawamba		216.8	348.9	MS 178 – Fulton, Tremont	
Itawamba		221.8	357.0	MS 76 east – Russellville	Western terminus of MS 76
Tishomingo		231.8	373.0	Tishomingo County 78	Proposed MS 767
Tishomingo	Belmont	232.2	373.7	MS 760 east to MS 366 – Golden, Red Bay	Western terminus of unsigned MS 760
Tishomingo	Belmont	233.8	376.3	MS 366 east – Golden, Red Bay	Western terminus of MS 366
Tishomingo	Dennis	237.8	382.7	MS 4 west – New Site	Eastern terminus of MS 4
Tishomingo		240.8	387.5	Natchez Trace Parkway	Interchange
Tishomingo		244.8	394.0	MS 30 – Paden Overlook, Crows Neck	
Tishomingo	Midway	249.8	402.0	MS 364 west – Holcut, Divide Section Wildlife Management Area Headquarters, Holcut Memorial	Eastern terminus of MS 364
Tishomingo	Iuka	254.8	410.1	US 72 – Corinth, Florence, AL	Interchange
Tishomingo	Iuka	255.2	410.7	MS 25 Bus. north (Battleground Drive)	Southern terminus of MS 25 Business
Tishomingo	Iuka	255.8	411.7	MS 172 – Iuka, Old Court House Museum	
Tishomingo	Iuka	256.8	413.3	County Road 231 - Harmony	
Tishomingo		257.8	414.9	MS 25 Bus. south	Northern terminus of MS 25 Bus.
Tishomingo	Cross Roads	264.8	426.2	MS 365 south – Burnsville	Northern terminus of MS 365
Tishomingo		267.8	431.0	MS 350 west – Corinth	Eastern terminus of MS 350
Tishomingo		269.8	434.2	SR 57 west – Pickwick Dam	Tennessee state line; northern terminus
1.000 mi = 1.609 km; 1.000 km = 0.621 mi: Concurrency terminus

== Related route ==
=== Iuka business route ===
Mississippi Highway 25 Business
- Location: Iuka
- Length: 2.7 mi (4.3 km)

Mississippi Highway 25 Business (MS 25 Bus.) is an earlier alignment of MS 25. It is an unsigned highway called Battleground Drive. The southern terminus at MS 25 is just outside of Downtown Iuka, where it intersects with MS 172; the northern terminus is at MS 25 north of Iuka.

=== Major intersections ===
The entire route is in Iuka, Tishomingo County.

mi	km	Destinations	Notes
0.00	0.00	MS 25	Southern terminus
1.0	1.6	MS 172	
2.7	4.3	MS 25	Northern terminus
1.000 mi = 1.609 km; 1.000 km = 0.621 mi
