= Banks, Mississippi =

Banks
- Unincorporated community
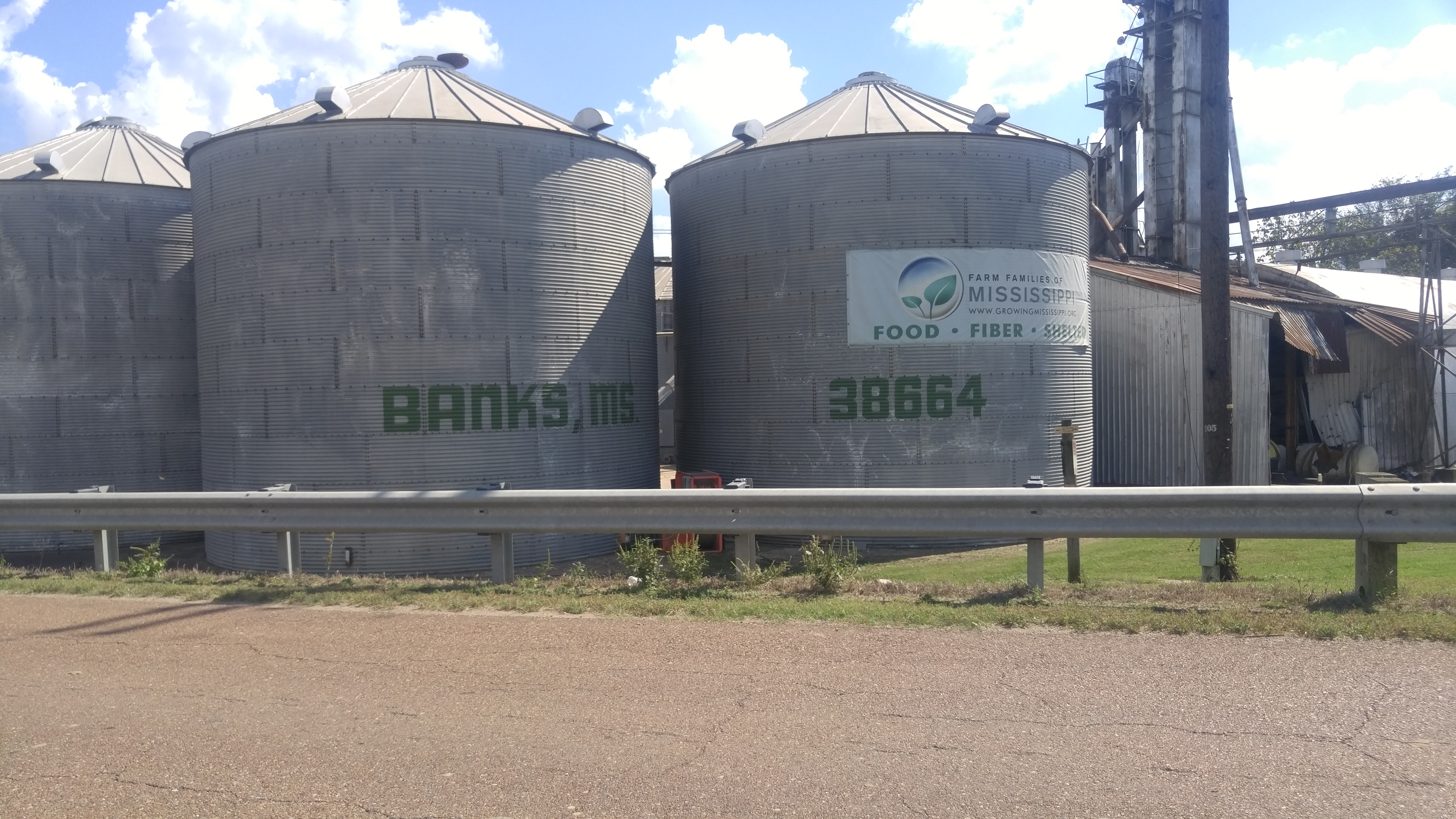
- Grain bins in Banks

- Location within the state of Mississippi
- Coordinates: 34°49′33″N 90°13′47″W
- Country: United States
- State: Mississippi
- County: Tunica
- Time zone: UTC-6 (Central (CST))
  - Summer (DST): UTC-5 (CDT)
- ZIP code: 38664

Banks is a small unincorporated community farming community in northeastern Tunica County, Mississippi, United States. It lies at the intersection of Mississippi Highway 3 and Mississippi Highway 713, several miles east of Tunica Resorts.

Ransom Byrnes first owned the land in 1877. Banks is named after Richard McPherson Banks, who founded the community in 1900.

The Canadian National Railway, formerly Illinois Central Railroad, passes through Banks.

Banks is also home to T.E. Swindoll & Company, a family owned farm.
