= Midway, Tishomingo County, Mississippi =

Midway, Mississippi
- Unincorporated community
- Location within Mississippi Location within the United States
- Coordinates: 34°43′52″N 88°13′29″W
- Country: United States
- State: Mississippi
- County: Tishomingo
- Elevation: 581 ft (177 m)
- Time zone: UTC-6 (Central (CST))
  - Summer (DST): UTC-5 (CDT)
- Area code: 662

Midway is an unincorporated community in Tishomingo County, Mississippi, United States. Midway is located at the junction of Mississippi Highway 25 and Mississippi Highway 364, 5.9 miles (9.5 km) south-southwest of Iuka.
