= Woodall Mountain =

Highest point in Mississippi, United States

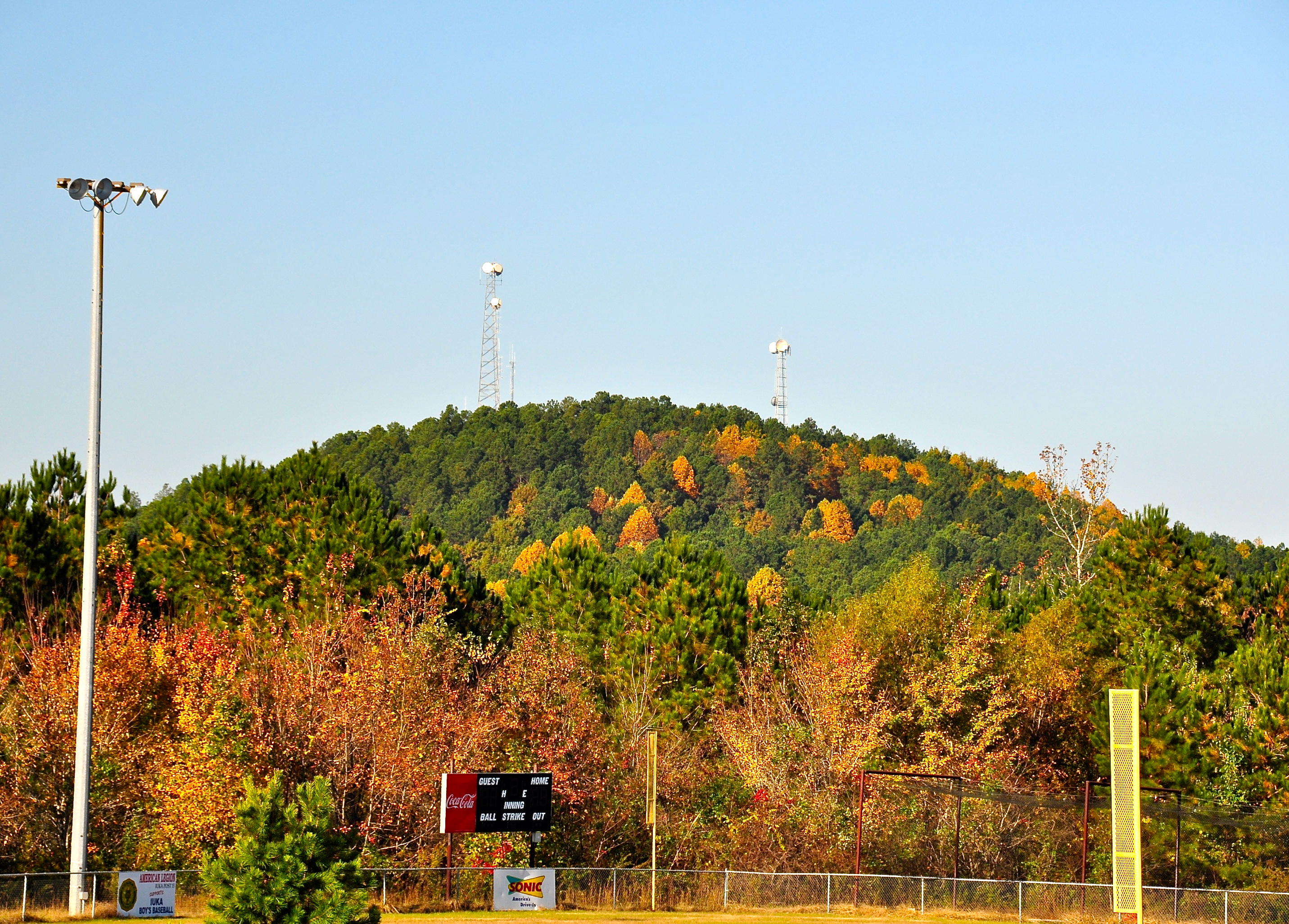

Highest point
- Elevation: 806 ft (246 m)
- Prominence: 296 ft (90 m)
- Listing: U.S. state high point 47th
- Coordinates: 34°47′16″N 88°14′30″W

Geography
- Location within Mississippi
- Location: Tishomingo County, Mississippi, U.S.
- Parent range: Southwest Appalachian Mountains
- Topo map: USGS Iuka

Geology
- Rock age: In the Millions

Woodall Mountain is the highest natural point in the U.S. state of Mississippi at 806 feet (246 m). It is located just off Mississippi Highway 25, south of Iuka in Tishomingo County in the northeast part of the state and is part of the Appalachian foothills.

== Description ==
Located in the northeast part of the state, Woodall Mountain is the highest natural point in the state of Mississippi at 806 feet (246 m). It was originally called Yow Hill. The summit is marked with a National Geodetic Survey triangulation station disk and three radio towers. A sign cautions visitors to prepare for a steep, unpaved, and rocky inclined road approximately a mile in length to the summit.

Atop the hill there is a bench, a high point register, and a gravel circle allowing parking for several vehicles. A wooden observation tower was constructed in the 20th century atop the hill in the middle of the gravel circle. The tower deteriorated over time, with some steps rotting; it was torn down in 1998.

== History ==
Woodall (Yow) Hill was the scene of fighting during the American Civil War. On September 19, 1862, the Battle of Iuka took place there. Union General William Rosecrans occupied the mountain and used it to launch artillery barrages on the town of Iuka, then under the control of General Sterling Price. The battle was a victory for the Union although Price avoided capture.

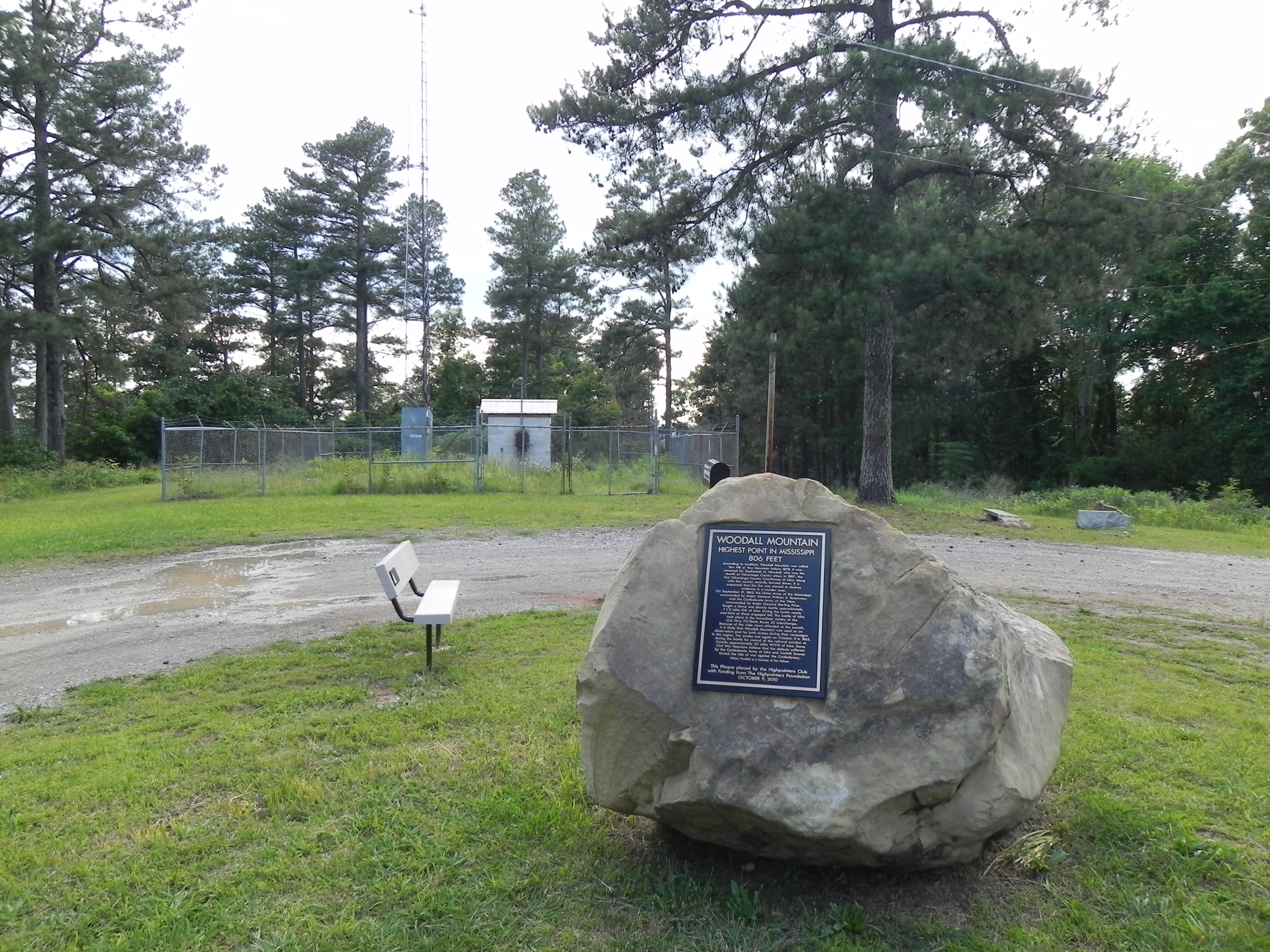
Summit area of Woodall Mountain

The hill was renamed after Zephaniah Woodall, sheriff of Tishomingo County, who bought it and surrounding land in 1884. Describing this hill as Woodall Mountain is often lampooned by locals. Some nearby stores souvenir T-shirts with the phrase "Ski Woodall".

== Representation in popular culture ==
- The Tupelo-based bluegrass band The Woodall Mountain Boys took their name from the mountain.

== See also ==
- Outline of Mississippi
- Index of Mississippi-related articles
- List of U.S. states by elevation
