= Mississippi Highway 366 (Tishomingo County) =

Highway in Tishomingo County, Mississippi

Mississippi Highway 366
- MS 366 highlighted in red

Route information
- Maintained by MDOT
- Length: 4.20 mi (6.76 km)
- Existed: 1958–present

Major junctions
- West end: MS 25 in Belmont
- East end: Fourth Street Northwest near Red Bay, AL

Location
- Country: United States
- State: Mississippi
- Counties: Tishomingo

Highway system
- Mississippi State Highway System; Interstate; US; State
← MS 365	→ MS 367

Mississippi Highway 366 (MS 366) is a short highway in northeastern Mississippi. The road starts at MS 25 in Belmont, and travels southeastward through Golden to the Alabama state border. The route was created in 1958, and hasn't changed significantly since.

== Route description ==
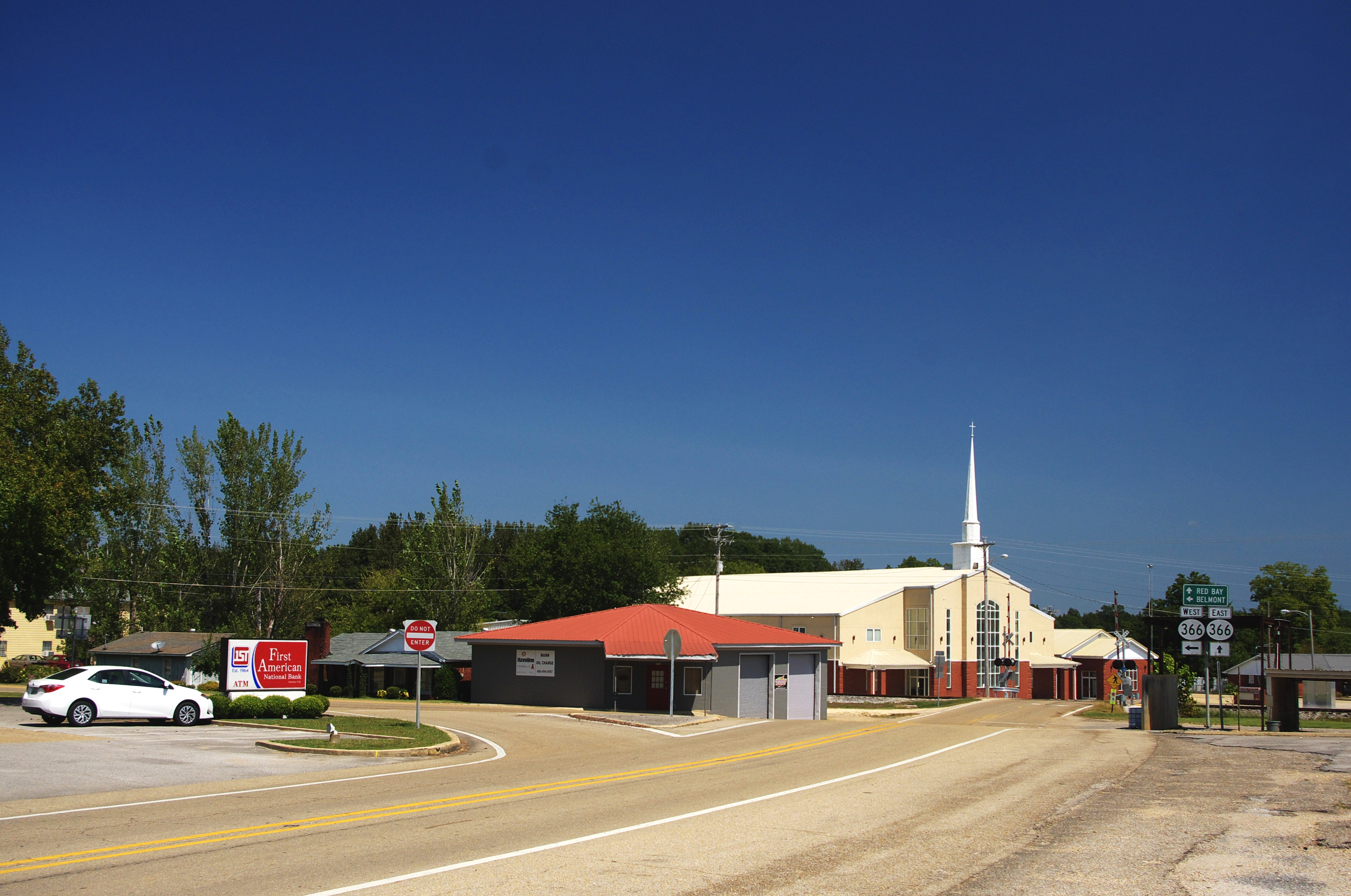
MS 366 in Golden

All of the route is in Tishomingo County. MS 366 starts at MS 25 in Belmont, locally known as Second Street. The route travels southeastward out of the town, through farmland and small areas of trees. At Searcy Road, MS 366 travels along a railway owned by Redmont Railway. The road soon enters the village of Golden. Near the center of the village, the route intersects the eastern terminus of MS 760. MS 366 then crosses over the railroad and temporarily travels east. Past Bear Creek Road, the route curved southeastward, intersecting a few more county roads. After passing County Road 78, MS 366 ends at the Alabama state line. The road continues as Fourth Street Northwest into Red Bay.

In 2013, Mississippi Department of Transportation (MDOT) calculated as many as 3,900 vehicles traveling east of Long Street, and as few as 2,800 vehicles traveling south of Shady Cove. The route is legally defined in Mississippi Code § 65-3-3. MS 366 is maintained by MDOT.

== History ==
In 1958, a new road in southeastern Tishomingo County was designated MS 366. The new, paved route started from MS 25 and ended at the Alabama state line. The road has not changed significantly since.

== Major intersections ==
The entire route is in Tishomingo County.

Location	mi	km	Destinations	Notes
Belmont	0.0	0.0	MS 25 (Second Street) – Fulton, Tishomingo, Iuka	Western terminus
Golden	1.5	2.4	MS 760 west (Stanphill Street)	Eastern terminus of MS 760
	4.2	6.8	Fourth Street Northwest - Red Bay	Eastern terminus; Alabama state line
1.000 mi = 1.609 km; 1.000 km = 0.621 mi
