= Mississippi Highway 172 =

Highway in Mississippi

Mississippi Highway 172
- MS 172 highlighted in red

Route information
- Maintained by MDOT
- Length: 12.074 mi (19.431 km)
- Existed: 1998–present

Major junctions
- West end: US 72 near Burnsville
- MS 25 in Iuka
- East end: US 72 near Oldham

Location
- Country: United States
- State: Mississippi
- Counties: Tishomingo

Highway system
- Mississippi State Highway System; Interstate; US; State
← MS 161	→ MS 178

Mississippi Highway 172 (MS 172) is a state highway located in Tishomingo County, Mississippi. The route runs 12.074 mi (19.431 km) from U.S. Route 72 (US 72) near Burnsville east to US 72 near Oldham, just west of the Alabama border. The route is a two-lane undivided road its entire length and runs mostly through wooded areas. It also passes through the town of Iuka, where it has an intersection with MS 25.

What is now MS 172 was originally designated as part of the Lee Highway auto trail in 1920 before becoming part of US 72 when the U.S. Highway System was created in 1926. The route was briefly US 78 before being redesignated US 72 by 1932. The route was fully paved by the end of the 1930s and served as a part of US 72 until 1986, when a new divided highway was built to the south. By 1998, the former routing of US 72 was designated MS 172.

== Route description ==
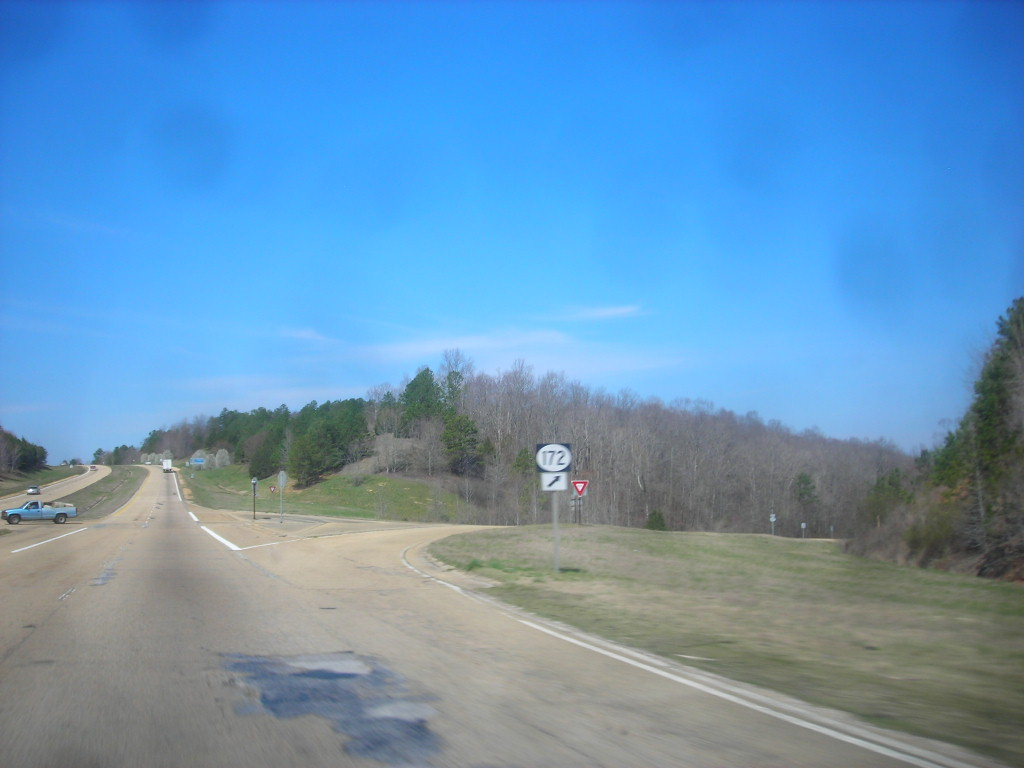
MS 172 shield along westbound US 72 at eastern terminus

MS 172 begins at an intersection with US 72 near Burnsville in the western part of Tishomingo County. The route heads to the north of US 72 as a two-lane undivided road before soon turning east-southeast at an intersection with County Road 982. From this point, the road heads through woodland with some farm fields and homes. Several miles later, the route turns more east and the surroundings become more developed as it becomes Quitman Street and reaches an intersection with MS 25 on the western edge of Iuka.

Past MS 25, MS 172 passes several businesses in Iuka as it comes to the MS 25 Business junction. The route continues east through wooded residential neighborhoods prior to making a turn to the southeast. MS 172 leaves Iuka and heads back into forests as an unnamed road, running a short distance to the southwest of Norfolk Southern's Memphis District — West End railroad line. Further southeast, the route draws closer to US 72 and curves to the east, passing a few fields. MS 172 makes a sharp turn south away from the railroad tracks and comes to its eastern terminus at US 72 immediately west of the Alabama border near Oldham. MS 172 is legally defined in Mississippi Code § 65-3-3.

== History ==
What is now MS 172 was originally designated as a part of the Lee Highway, an auto trail that connected Washington, D.C. with San Diego, in 1920. With the establishment of the U.S. Highway System in 1926, this route was initially designated as part of US 72, a U.S. route that was to run from Memphis, Tennessee east to Chattanooga, Tennessee. However, the route was instead designated as part of US 78 by 1928, at which time it was a gravel road.

By 1932, US 72 and US 78 switched routes in Mississippi, with the present-day alignment of MS 172 again becoming part of US 72 as initially planned in 1926. In 1935, the road was paved to the east of Iuka. The paved portion was extended slightly west of Iuka in 1936 and further west by 1938. By 1939, the section of US 72 that would be redesignated as MS 172 was fully paved. In 1986, US 72 was moved to a new divided highway alignment to the south through Tishomingo County. By 1998, MS 172 was marked on the former two-lane alignment of US 72 in Tishomingo County.

== Major intersections ==
The entire route is in Tishomingo County.

Location	mi	km	Destinations	Notes
Burnsville	0.000	0.000	US 72 (Lee Highway) – Corinth, Muscle Shoals, AL	Western terminus
Iuka	5.285– 5.303	8.505– 8.534	MS 25 (Veterans Memorial Drive) – Fulton, Savannah, TN	
Iuka	5.836	9.392	MS 25 Bus. (Battleground Drive)	
Oldham	12.074	19.431	US 72 (Lee Highway) – Corinth, Muscle Shoals, AL	Eastern terminus
1.000 mi = 1.609 km; 1.000 km = 0.621 mi
