= Oldham, Mississippi =

- Unincorporated community
- Location within Mississippi Location within the United States
- Coordinates: 34°46′23″N 88°07′42″W
- Country: United States
- State: Mississippi
- County: Tishomingo
- Elevation: 443 ft (135 m)
- Time zone: UTC-6 (Central (CST))
  - Summer (DST): UTC-5 (CDT)
- Area code: 662
- GNIS feature ID: 675278

Oldham is an unincorporated community in Tishomingo County, Mississippi, United States. Oldham is located on Mississippi Highway 172 4.5 miles (7.2 km) southeast of Iuka and one mile west of the Mississippi-Alabama state line.
