= Belmont, Mississippi =

- Town
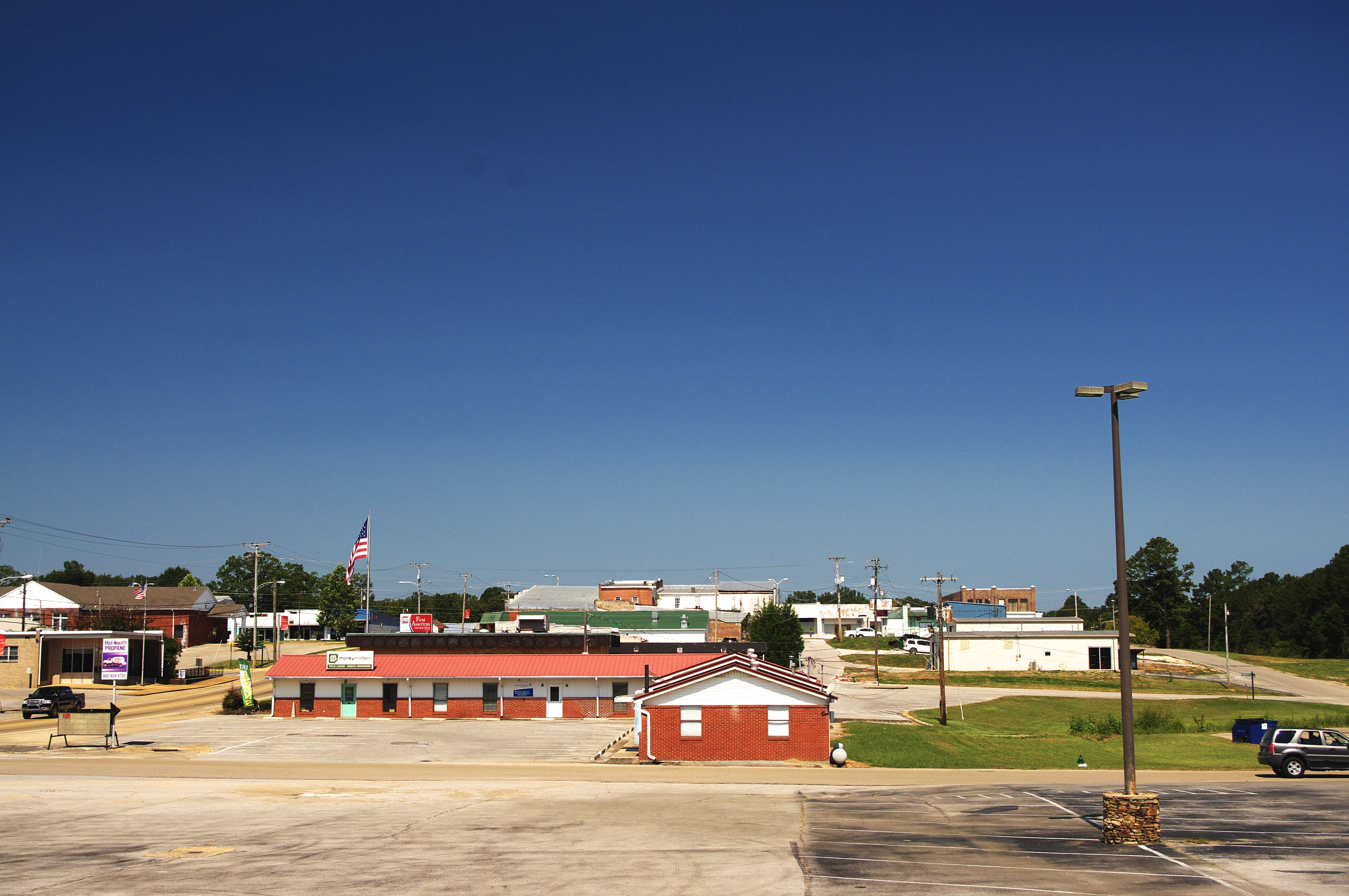
- Downtown Belmont

- Flag Logo

- Location of Belmont, Mississippi

- Location in the United States
- Coordinates: 34°29′50″N 88°12′20″W
- Country: United States
- State: Mississippi
- County: Tishomingo

Area
  - Total: 4.74 sq mi (12.28 km^{2})
  - Land: 4.73 sq mi (12.25 km^{2})
  - Water: 0.012 sq mi (0.03 km^{2})
- Elevation: 581 ft (177 m)

Population (2020)
  - Total: 1,859
  - Density: 393.1/sq mi (151.78/km^{2})
- Time zone: UTC-6 (Central (CST))
  - Summer (DST): UTC-5 (CDT)
- ZIP code: 38827
- Area code: 662
- FIPS code: 28-05100
- GNIS feature ID: 2405237
- Website: cityofbelmontms.com

Belmont is a town in Tishomingo County, Mississippi, United States. As of the 2020 census, Belmont had a population of 1,859.

== History ==
The settlement of Belmont was originally called Gum Springs with a post office built in 1884. After completion of the Birmingham Division of the Illinois Central Railroad in 1907 the town grew considerably. It was incorporated as Belmont (meaning "beautiful mountain") on January 22, 1908.

== Geography ==
According to the United States Census Bureau, the town has a total area of 4.7 square miles (12 km^{2}), of which 4.7 square miles (12 km^{2}) is land and 0.21% is water. The town is concentrated along Mississippi Highway 25 in southern Tishomingo County, a few miles west of the Mississippi-Alabama state line. Golden borders Belmont to the southeast, and Tishomingo lies a few miles to the north. Mississippi Highway 366 intersects MS 25 in Belmont, and continues southeastward through Golden to the state line, eventually becoming 4th Street in Red Bay, Alabama.

=== Communities near Belmont ===
- Golden - 1.88 miles (3.03 km)
- Red Bay, Alabama - 6.20 miles (9.98 km)
- Tishomingo - 8.86 miles (14.26 km)
- Vina, Alabama - 12.58 miles (20.25 km)
- Dennis - about 3 miles (4.8 km)

== Demographics ==
Historical population
Census	Pop.	Note	%±
1910	367		—
1920	459		25.1%
1930	703		53.2%
1940	594		−15.5%
1950	814		37.0%
1960	901		10.7%
1970	1,237		37.3%
1980	1,420		14.8%
1990	1,554		9.4%
2000	1,961		26.2%
2010	2,021		3.1%
2020	1,859		−8.0%
U.S. Decennial Census

=== 2020 census ===
As of the 2020 census, Belmont had a population of 1,859. The median age was 36.7 years. 25.1% of residents were under the age of 18 and 16.7% of residents were 65 years of age or older. For every 100 females there were 91.3 males, and for every 100 females age 18 and over there were 89.5 males age 18 and over.

0.0% of residents lived in urban areas, while 100.0% lived in rural areas.

There were 752 households in Belmont, of which 35.9% had children under the age of 18 living in them. Of all households, 48.9% were married-couple households, 16.8% were households with a male householder and no spouse or partner present, and 29.5% were households with a female householder and no spouse or partner present. About 30.2% of all households were made up of individuals and 14.2% had someone living alone who was 65 years of age or older.

There were 925 housing units, of which 18.7% were vacant. The homeowner vacancy rate was 3.3% and the rental vacancy rate was 29.6%.

Belmont racial composition
Race	Num.	Perc.
White (non-Hispanic)	1,578	84.88%
Black or African American (non-Hispanic)	10	0.54%
Native American	4	0.22%
Asian	4	0.22%
Other/Mixed	60	3.23%
Hispanic or Latino	203	10.92%

=== 2000 census ===
As of the census of 2000, there were 1,961 people, 799 households, and 555 families residing in the town. The population density was 415.7 inhabitants per square mile (160.5/km^{2}). There were 895 housing units at an average density of 189.7 per square mile (73.2/km^{2}). The racial makeup of the town was 92.71% White, 0.56% African American, 6.22% from other races, and 0.51% from two or more races. Hispanic or Latino of any race were 8.11% of the population.

There were 799 households, out of which 34.0% had children under the age of 18 living with them, 52.3% were married couples living together, 12.6% had a female householder with no husband present, and 30.5% were non-families. 28.8% of all households were made up of individuals, and 14.9% had someone living alone who was 65 years of age or older. The average household size was 2.45 and the average family size was 2.97.

In the town, the population was spread out, with 26.3% under the age of 18, 8.6% from 18 to 24, 28.6% from 25 to 44, 22.3% from 45 to 64, and 14.3% who were 65 years of age or older. The median age was 35 years. For every 100 females, there were 91.7 males. For every 100 females age 18 and over, there were 87.1 males.

The median income for a household in the town was $29,702, and the median income for a family was $37,639. Males had a median income of $27,404 versus $20,192 for females. The per capita income for the town was $16,122. About 10.9% of families and 14.7% of the population were below the poverty line, including 16.2% of those under age 18 and 16.0% of those age 65 or over.

== Government ==
Belmont's current mayor is Buddy Wiltshire. The five aldermen are Mike Braden, Robert Hester, Mike Neighbors, Brandon Pharr, Steve Smith.

Belmont's Police Chief is Donald Ray Thomas with full time Police Officers Patrick D. Brown and Lee Jamison. There are part-time officers that work for the department as well.

== Education ==
=== Colleges ===
- Northeast Mississippi Community College - Belmont lies within the Northeast Mississippi Community College District.

=== Public schools ===
- Belmont School - grades K-12 with 1538 students Home of the Cardinals.

=== Private schools ===
- Emanuel Christian School - a coed private school with grades PK-12 and an enrollment of 52 students

=== Libraries ===
- Belmont Public Library, a branch of the Northeast Regional Library

== Transportation ==
=== Highways ===
- Mississippi Highway 25 - north-south corridor that travels from Jackson, Mississippi to the Tennessee state line
- Mississippi Highway 366 - runs southeast to the Alabama state line

=== Air travel ===
- Tishomingo County Airport

== Notable residents ==
- Mac McAnally - singer/songwriter
