= Dennis, Mississippi =

- Census-designated place
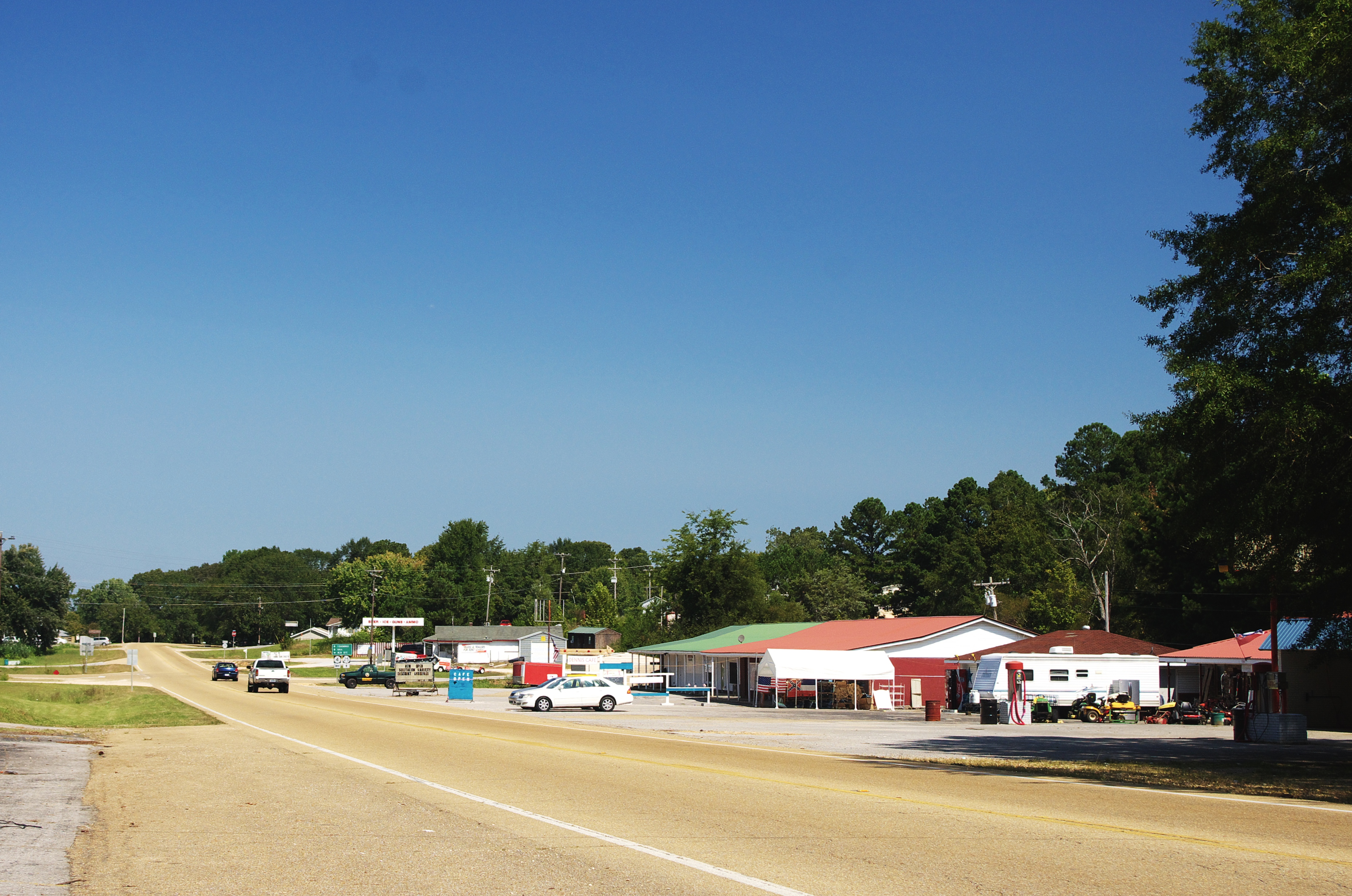
- MS 25 in Dennis

- Location within Mississippi Location within the United States
- Coordinates: 34°33′31″N 88°13′34″W
- Country: United States
- State: Mississippi
- County: Tishomingo

Area
  - Total: 1.36 sq mi (3.51 km^{2})
  - Land: 1.36 sq mi (3.51 km^{2})
  - Water: 0 sq mi (0.00 km^{2})
- Elevation: 581 ft (177 m)

Population (2020)
  - Total: 172
  - Density: 126.8/sq mi (48.95/km^{2})
- Time zone: UTC-6 (Central (CST))
  - Summer (DST): UTC-5 (CDT)
- ZIP code: 38838
- Area code: 662
- GNIS feature ID: 669338

Dennis is a census-designated place (CDP) and unincorporated community located at the intersection of Mississippi Highway 25 and Mississippi Highway 4 in Tishomingo County, Mississippi, United States. Dennis is approximately 6 miles (9.7 km) south of Tishomingo and 3 miles (4.8 km) north of Belmont.

Although an unincorporated community, Dennis has a post office.

Per the 2020 Census, the population was 172.

== Demographics ==
Historical population
Census	Pop.	Note	%±
2020	172		—
U.S. Decennial Census; 2020

Dennis was first listed as a census designated place in the 2020 U.S. census.

=== 2020 census ===
Dennis CDP, Mississippi – Racial and ethnic composition Note: the US Census treats Hispanic/Latino as an ethnic category. This table excludes Latinos from the racial categories and assigns them to a separate category. Hispanics/Latinos may be of any race.
Race / Ethnicity (NH = Non-Hispanic)	Pop 2020	% 2020
White alone (NH)	150	87.21%
Black or African American alone (NH)	2	1.16%
Native American or Alaska Native alone (NH)	0	0.00%
Asian alone (NH)	0	0.00%
Native Hawaiian or Pacific Islander alone (NH)	0	0.00%
Other race alone (NH)	0	0.00%
Mixed race or Multiracial (NH)	8	4.65%
Hispanic or Latino (any race)	12	6.98%
Total	172	100.00%
