= Holcut, Mississippi =

Coordinates: 34°43′47″N 88°18′21″W

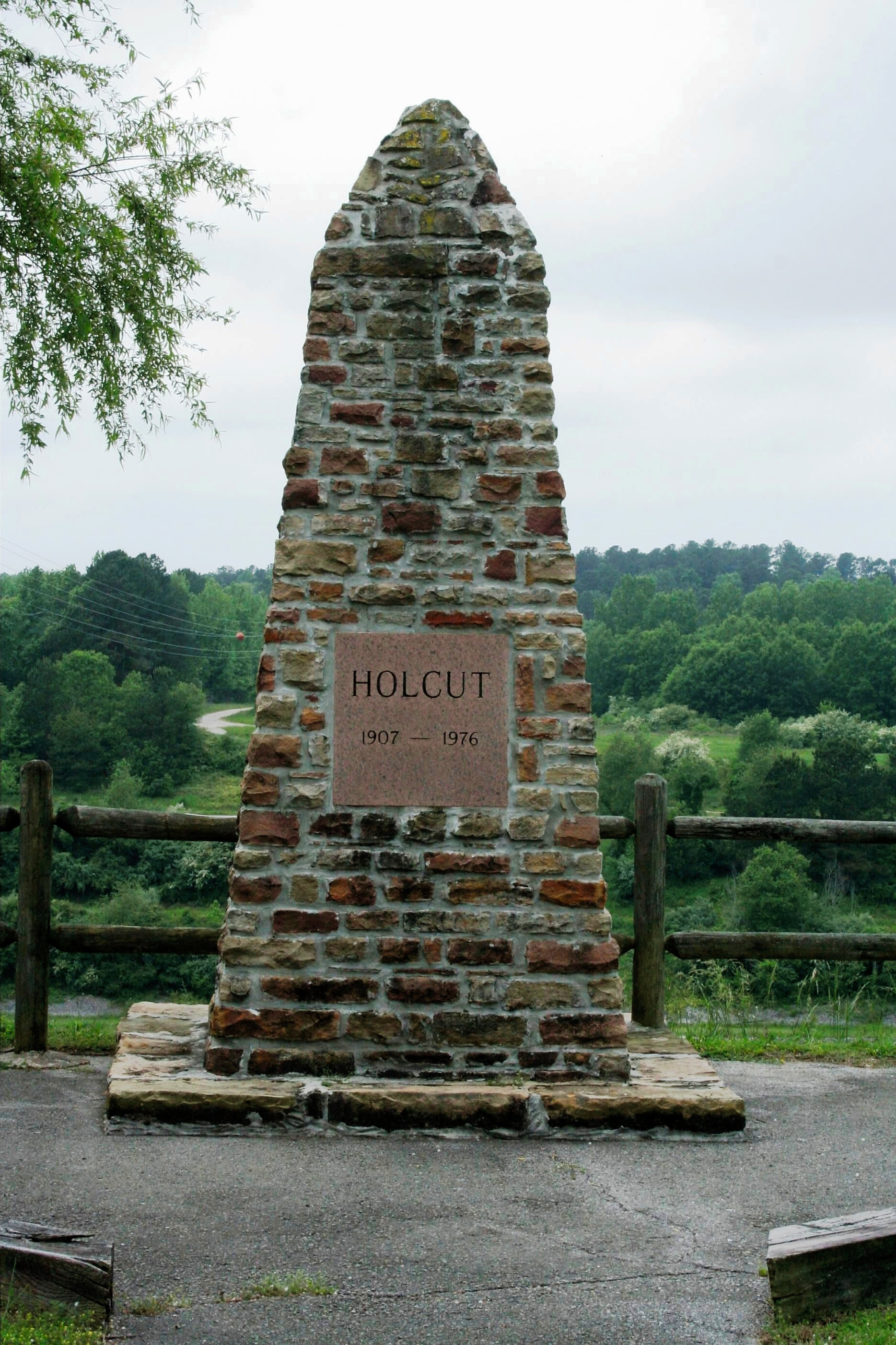
Holcut Memorial Stone obelisk erected at the site

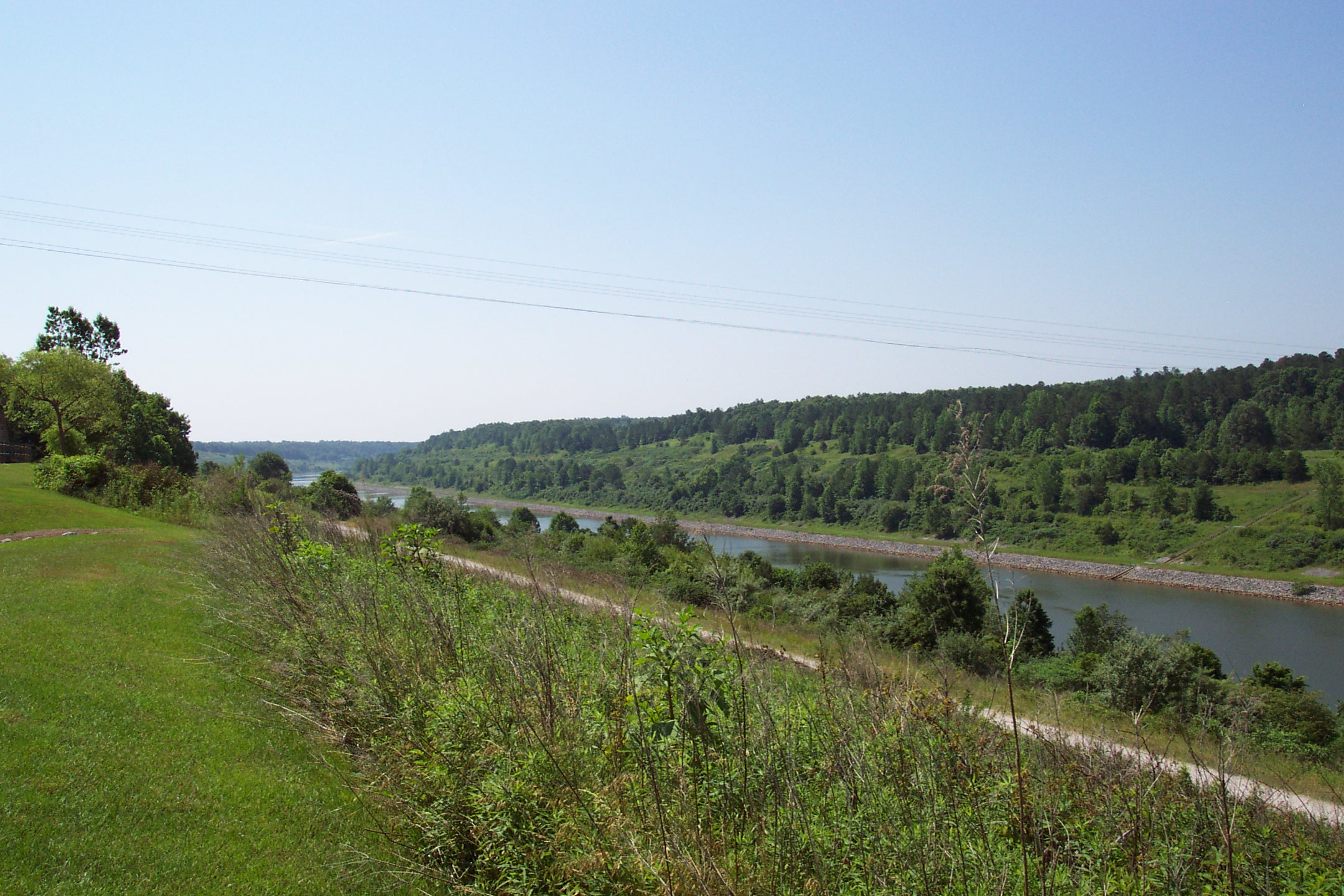
A view of the Divide Cut of the Tennessee–Tombigbee Waterway from the Holcut Memorial site

Holcut was a small town in Tishomingo County, Mississippi, United States. In 1975, the U.S. Army Corps of Engineers bought out and demolished the town because it lay in the path of the Divide Cut, a 29-mile (47 km) canal section of the Tennessee–Tombigbee Waterway, which was constructed between 1972 and 1984.

After the town was demolished, the Corps of Engineers established a Holcut memorial next to the canal near the site of the town.

== See also ==
- List of ghost towns in Mississippi
