= Golden, Mississippi =

- Town
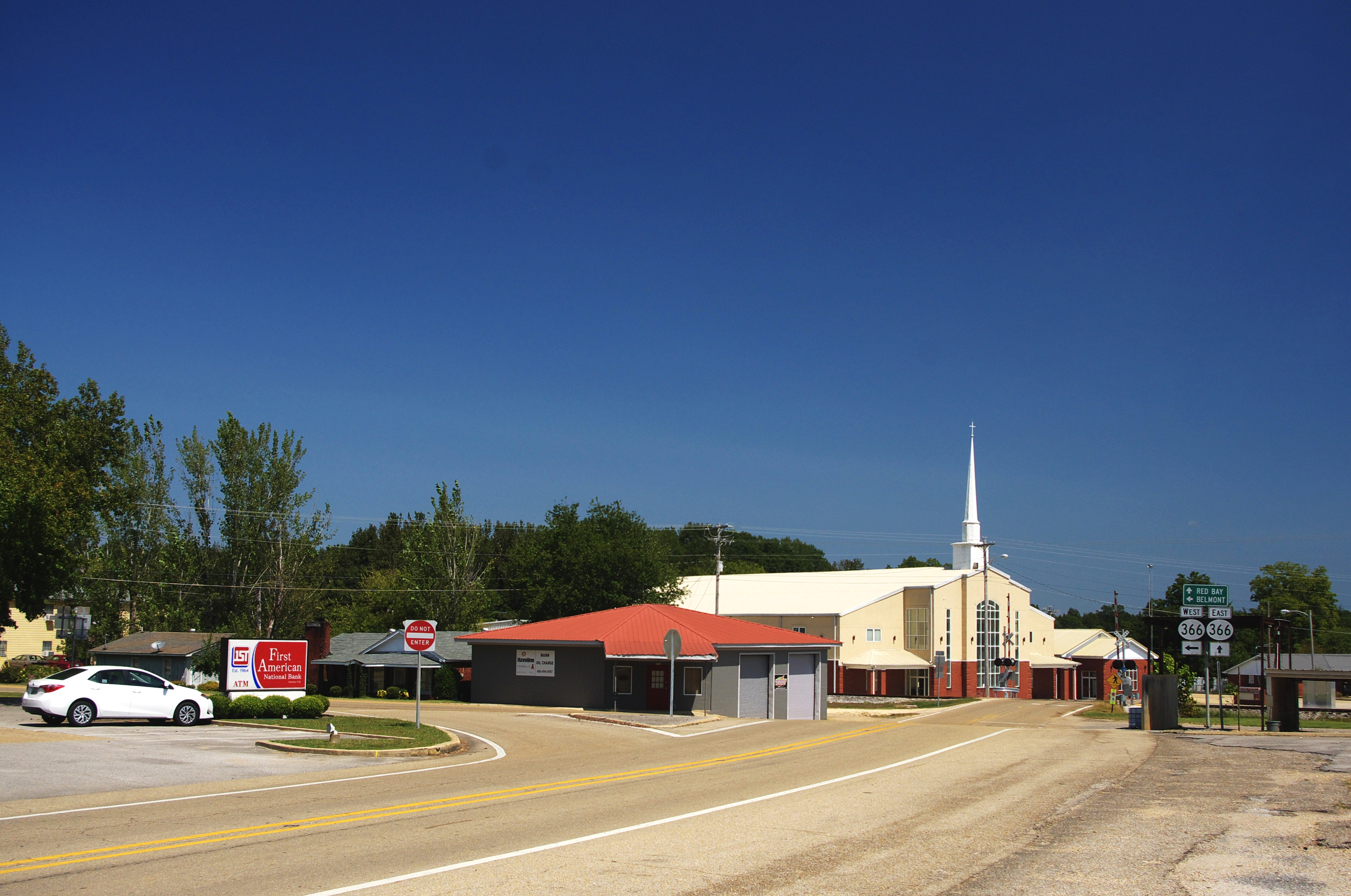
- MS 366 in Golden

- Location of Golden, Mississippi

- Location in the United States
- Coordinates: 34°29′11″N 88°11′11″W
- Country: United States
- State: Mississippi
- County: Tishomingo

Area
  - Total: 0.58 sq mi (1.50 km^{2})
  - Land: 0.58 sq mi (1.50 km^{2})
  - Water: 0 sq mi (0.00 km^{2})
- Elevation: 548 ft (167 m)

Population (2020)
  - Total: 192
  - Density: 330.8/sq mi (127.74/km^{2})
- Time zone: UTC-6 (Central (CST))
  - Summer (DST): UTC-5 (CDT)
- FIPS code: 28-27940
- GNIS feature ID: 2406582

Golden is a town in Tishomingo County, Mississippi, United States. The population was 192 at the 2020 census. The current Mayor of the Town of Golden is Sherry Shook. The current Police Chief is John M. Brown

== History ==
The community of Golden originally sprang up around Golden Sawmill. Almost all of the inhabitants of Golden were employed by the sawmill, and its decline corresponded with a decline in the town's prosperity. The building of the railroad in the early 1900s brought new life to the town and it was incorporated on February 8, 1908. The town was named for the baby of one of the area's early settlers, Golden Patrie Wiggins.

== Geography ==
Golden is concentrated along Mississippi Highway 366 in southern Tishomingo County. It lies just southeast of Belmont, and a few miles west of the Mississippi-Alabama border. In Golden, MS 366 runs in a southeastward direction from Belmont before bending sharply to the northeast near the center of town, and then veering southeastward again en route to Red Bay, Alabama, where it becomes 4th Street.

According to the United States Census Bureau, the town has a total area of 0.6 square miles (1.6 km^{2}), all land.

=== Communities near Golden ===
- Belmont - 2.29 miles (3.69 km)
- Red Bay, Alabama - 3.92 miles (6.31 km)
- Vina, Alabama - 10.29 miles (16.56 km)

=== Rivers and streams ===
- Bear Creek
- Epps Branch
- Wofford Branch

== Demographics ==
Historical population
Census	Pop.	Note	%±
1910	209		—
1920	194		−7.2%
1930	569		193.3%
1940	340		−40.2%
1950	206		−39.4%
1960	121		−41.3%
1970	339		180.2%
1980	292		−13.9%
1990	202		−30.8%
2000	201		−0.5%
2010	191		−5.0%
2020	192		0.5%
U.S. Decennial Census

City of Golden
Population by year

1990 - 202
2000 - 201
2004 - 201 (estimate)

As of the census of 2020, there were 192 people, 87 households, and 52 families residing in the town. The population density was 354.2 inhabitants per square mile (136.8/km^{2}). There were 106 housing units at an average density of 186.8 per square mile (72.1/km^{2}). The racial makeup of the town was 91.04% White, 1.00% African American, 7.46% from other races, and 0.50% from two or more races. Hispanic or Latino of any race were 9.95% of the population.

There were 87 households, out of which 24.1% had children under the age of 18 living with them, 51.7% were married couples living together, 3.4% had a female householder with no husband present, and 39.1% were non-families. 33.3% of all households were made up of individuals, and 14.9% had someone living alone who was 65 years of age or older. The average household size was 2.31 and the average family size was 2.92.

In the town, the population was spread out, with 17.9% under the age of 18, 12.9% from 18 to 24, 30.3% from 25 to 44, 17.4% from 45 to 64, and 21.4% who were 65 years of age or older. The median age was 38 years. For every 100 females, there were 103.0 males. For every 100 females age 18 and over, there were 108.9 males.

The median income for a household in the town was $20,208, and the median income for a family was $33,333. Males had a median income of $26,250 versus $19,250 for females. The per capita income for the town was $13,047. About 19.4% of families and 19.0% of the population were below the poverty line, including 14.3% of those under the age of eighteen and 37.1% of those 65 or over.

The Mayor of the Town of Golden is Sherry Shook.

The Police Chief is John M. Brown.

== Education ==
=== Public schools ===
The Town of Golden is served by the Tishomingo County School District.

== Transportation ==
=== Highways ===
- Mississippi Highway 366 - runs southeast to the Alabama state line
