= Tishomingo County, Mississippi =

County in Mississippi, United States

- County
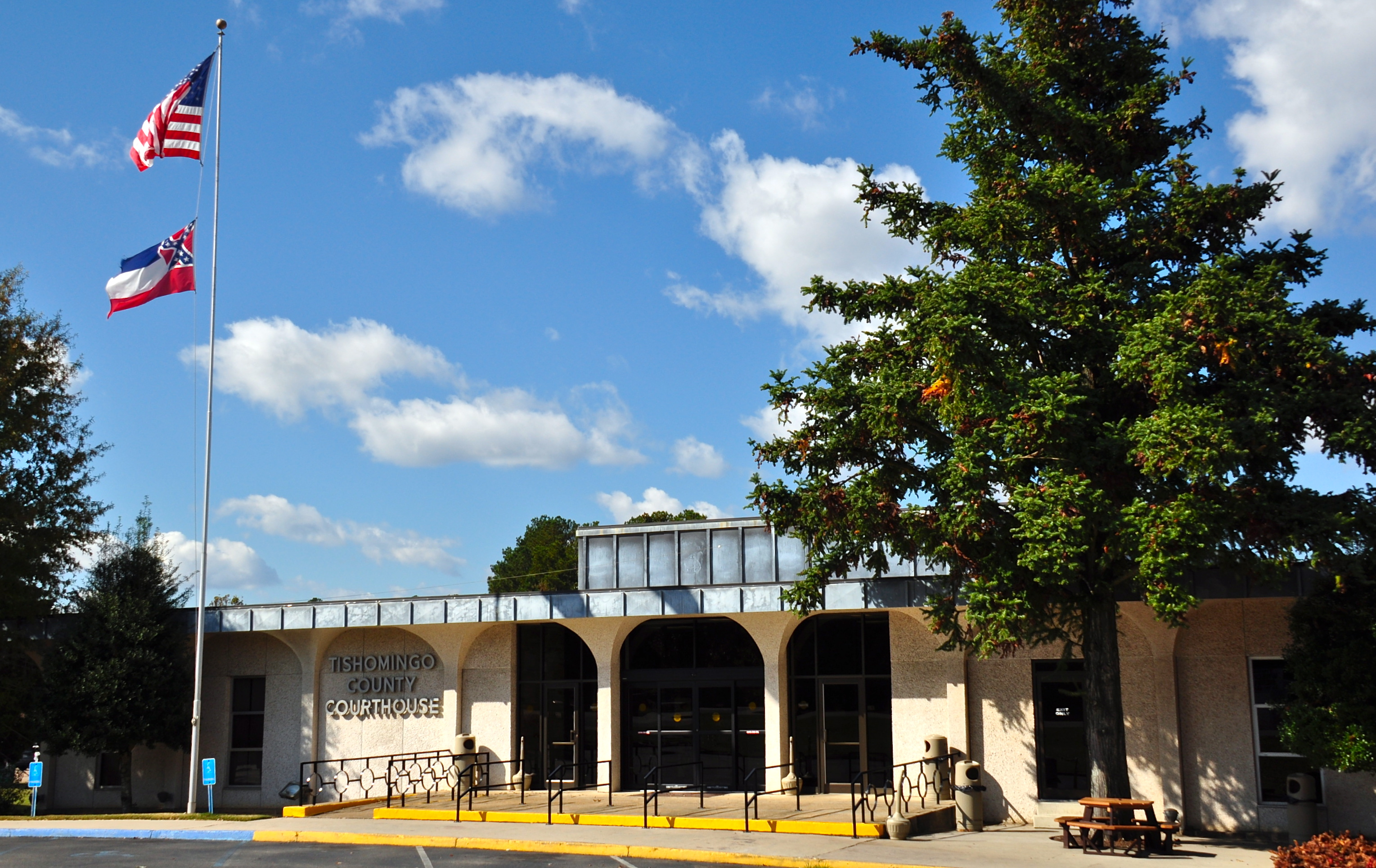
- Tishomingo County Courthouse in Iuka

- Location within the U.S. state of Mississippi
- Coordinates: 34°44′25.6″N 88°14′21.6″W
- Country: United States
- State: Mississippi
- Founded: February 9, 1836 (190 years ago)
- Named for: Tishomingo
- Seat: Iuka
- Largest city: Iuka

Area
  - Total: 445 sq mi (1,150 km^{2})
  - Land: 424 sq mi (1,100 km^{2})
  - Water: 20 sq mi (52 km^{2}) 4.6%

Population (2020)
  - Total: 18,850
  - Estimate (2025): 18,639 ▼
  - Density: 44.5/sq mi (17.2/km^{2})
- Time zone: UTC−6 (Central)
  - Summer (DST): UTC−5 (CDT)
- Congressional district: 1st
- Website: co.tishomingo.ms.us

Tishomingo County is a county located in the northeastern corner of the U.S. state of Mississippi. As of the 2020 census, the population was 18,850. Its county seat is Iuka.

== History ==
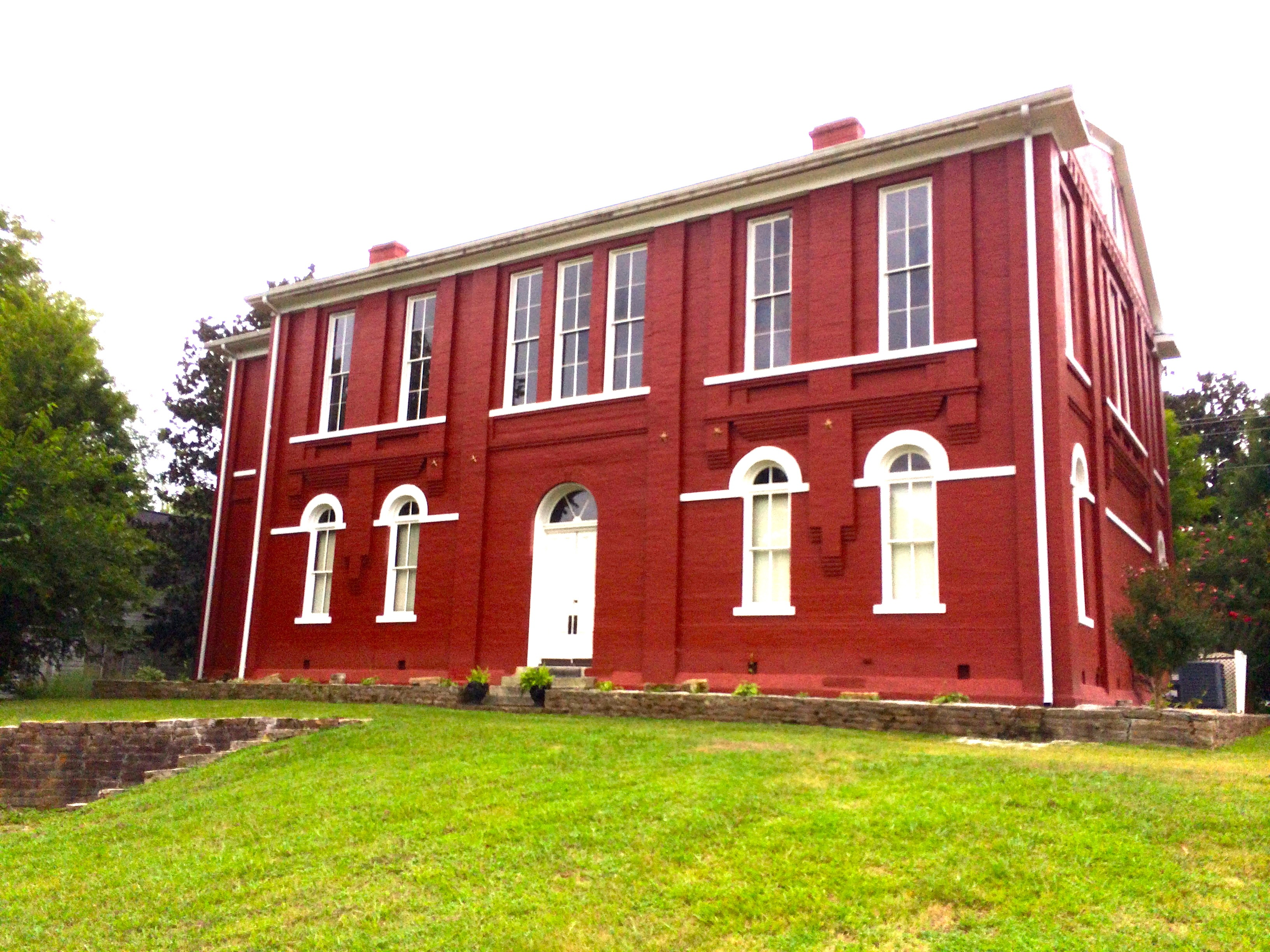
Old Tishomingo County Courthouse

Tishomingo County was organized February 9, 1836, from Chickasaw lands that were ceded to the United States. The Chickasaw were forced by Indian Removal to relocate to lands in the Indian Territory (present-day Oklahoma). Jacinto was the original county seat of Tishomingo County and its historic courthouse building is listed on the National Register of Historic Places.

Parts of the northeastern side of Tishomingo county are part of the Battle of Shiloh Civil War battlefield. In 1870 the area was divided into Alcorn, Prentiss and Tishomingo counties. Tishomingo's county seat was relocated to Iuka.

== Geography ==
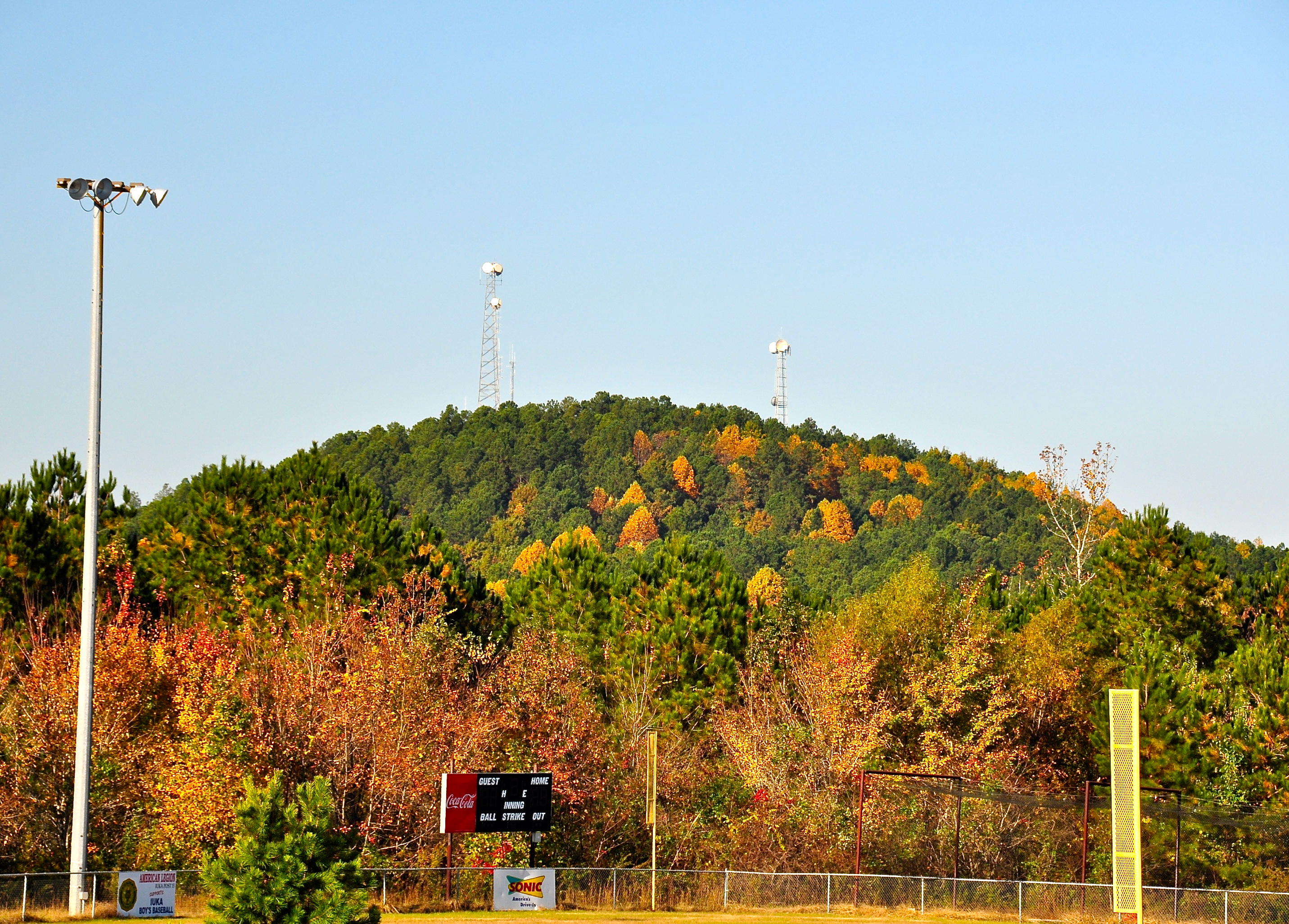
Woodall Mountain, elevation 807 feet, is the highest point in the state of Mississippi.

According to the U.S. Census Bureau, the county has a total area of 445 square miles (1,150 km^{2}), of which 424 square miles (1,100 km^{2}) is land and 20 square miles (52 km^{2}) (4.6%) is water. The highest natural point in Mississippi, the 806 feet (246 meters) Woodall Mountain, is located in the county. Tishomingo County is the only county in Mississippi with outcroppings of natural limestone formations.

=== Adjacent counties ===
- Hardin County, Tennessee (north)
- Lauderdale County, Alabama (northeast)
- Colbert County, Alabama (east)
- Franklin County, Alabama (southeast)
- Itawamba County (south)
- Prentiss County (southwest)
- Alcorn County (northwest)

=== Major highways ===
- U.S. Route 72
- Mississippi Highway 4
- Mississippi Highway 25
- Mississippi Highway 30
- Mississippi Highway 172
- Mississippi Highway 350
- Mississippi Highway 364
- Mississippi Highway 365
- Mississippi Highway 366
- Mississippi Highway 760
- Natchez Trace Parkway

=== National protected area ===
Natchez Trace Parkway

== Demographics ==
Historical population
Census	Pop.	Note	%±
1840	6,681		—
1850	15,490		131.9%
1860	24,149		55.9%
1870	7,350		−69.6%
1880	8,774		19.4%
1890	9,302		6.0%
1900	10,124		8.8%
1910	13,067		29.1%
1920	15,091		15.5%
1930	16,411		8.7%
1940	16,974		3.4%
1950	15,544		−8.4%
1960	13,889		−10.6%
1970	14,940		7.6%
1980	18,434		23.4%
1990	17,683		−4.1%
2000	19,163		8.4%
2010	19,593		2.2%
2020	18,850		−3.8%
2025 (est.)	18,639	▼	−1.1%
U.S. Decennial Census; 1790-1960 1900-1990; 1990-2000 2010-2013

=== Racial and ethnic composition ===
Tishomingo County, Mississippi – Racial and ethnic composition Note: the US Census treats Hispanic/Latino as an ethnic category. This table excludes Latinos from the racial categories and assigns them to a separate category. Hispanics/Latinos may be of any race.
Race / Ethnicity (NH = Non-Hispanic)	Pop 1980	Pop 1990	Pop 2000	Pop 2010	Pop 2020	% 1980	% 1990	% 2000	% 2010	% 2020
White alone (NH)	17,604	16,967	18,067	18,326	17,169	95.50%	95.95%	94.28%	93.53%	91.08%
Black or African American alone (NH)	683	628	595	516	433	3.71%	3.55%	3.10%	2.63%	2.30%
Native American or Alaska Native alone (NH)	58	18	40	32	48	0.31%	0.10%	0.21%	0.16%	0.25%
Asian alone (NH)	10	13	12	21	41	0.05%	0.07%	0.06%	0.11%	0.22%
Native Hawaiian or Pacific Islander alone (NH)	x	x	2	1	0	x	x	0.01%	0.01%	0.00%
Other race alone (NH)	0	1	4	1	8	0.00%	0.01%	0.02%	0.01%	0.04%
Mixed race or Multiracial (NH)	x	x	100	143	614	x	x	0.52%	0.73%	3.26%
Hispanic or Latino (any race)	79	56	343	553	537	0.43%	0.32%	1.79%	2.82%	2.85%
Total	18,434	17,683	19,163	19,593	18,850	100.00%	100.00%	100.00%	100.00%	100.00%

=== 2020 census ===
As of the 2020 census, the county had a population of 18,850. The median age was 44.9 years. 20.9% of residents were under the age of 18 and 22.4% of residents were 65 years of age or older. For every 100 females there were 95.3 males, and for every 100 females age 18 and over there were 93.7 males age 18 and over.

The racial makeup of the county was 92.0% White, 2.3% Black or African American, 0.3% American Indian and Alaska Native, 0.2% Asian, <0.1% Native Hawaiian and Pacific Islander, 1.3% from some other race, and 3.8% from two or more races. Hispanic or Latino residents of any race comprised 2.8% of the population.

<0.1% of residents lived in urban areas, while 100.0% lived in rural areas.

There were 7,917 households in the county, of which 27.2% had children under the age of 18 living in them. Of all households, 49.5% were married-couple households, 19.3% were households with a male householder and no spouse or partner present, and 26.9% were households with a female householder and no spouse or partner present. About 30.7% of all households were made up of individuals and 15.2% had someone living alone who was 65 years of age or older.

There were 10,512 housing units, of which 24.7% were vacant. Among occupied housing units, 74.8% were owner-occupied and 25.2% were renter-occupied. The homeowner vacancy rate was 2.4% and the rental vacancy rate was 17.3%.

=== 2010 census ===
As of the 2010 United States census, there were 19,593 people living in the county. 94.5% were White, 2.6% Black or African American, 0.2% Native American, 0.1% Asian, 1.7% of some other race and 0.8% of two or more races. 2.8% were Hispanic or Latino (of any race).

=== 2000 census ===
As of the census of 2000 there were 19,163 people, 7,917 households, and 5,573 families living in the county. The population density was 45 people per square mile (17 people/km^{2}). There were 9,553 housing units at an average density of 22 units per square mile (8.5 units/km^{2}). The racial makeup of the county was 94.93% White, 3.11% Black or African American, 0.21% Native American, 0.08% Asian, 0.01% Pacific Islander, 1.06% from other races, and 0.59% from two or more races. 1.79% of the population were Hispanic or Latino of any race.

By 2005 the population was 93.4% non-Hispanic white. 3.6% of the population was African-American. 2.6% of the population was Latino.

At 93.4% of the county's population, Tishomingo County has the highest percentage of Non-Hispanic whites in the state of Mississippi.

In 2000 there were 7,917 households, out of which 30.2% had children under the age of 18 living with them, 57.1% were married couples living together, 10.1% had a female householder with no husband present, and 29.6% were non-families. 27.5% of all households were made up of individuals, and 12.8% had someone living alone who was 65 years of age or older. The average household size was 2.39 and the average family size was 2.89.

In the county, the population was spread out, with 23.2% under the age of 18, 7.8% from 18 to 24, 27.5% from 25 to 44, 24.7% from 45 to 64, and 16.8% who were 65 years of age or older. The median age was 39 years. For every 100 females there were 92.7 males. For every 100 females age 18 and over, there were 89.8 males.

The median income for a household in the county was $28,315, and the median income for a family was $34,378. Males had a median income of $28,109 versus $19,943 for females. The per capita income for the county was $15,395. About 11% of families and 14.1% of the population were below the poverty line, including 15.6% of those under age 18 and 15.6% of those age 65 or over.

== Recreation ==
- Tishomingo State Park is located in the foothills of the Appalachian Mountains in Tishomingo County, Mississippi, north of Tupelo, Mississippi. Activities in the park including canoeing, rock climbing, fishing and hiking. The park was constructed by the Civilian Conservation Corps during the 1930s. Many of the original buildings are still standing. The park is named for an early leader of the Chickasaw nation, Tishomingo (1734-1838).
- J.P. Coleman State Park is a state park in the U.S. state of Mississippi. It is located north of Iuka off Mississippi Highway 25. It sits along the banks of the Tennessee River and Pickwick Lake. The park is named for James P. Coleman, a former governor of Mississippi. Activities include sailing, swimming, camping, hiking, skiing, and fishing for smallmouth bass.
- Bay Springs Lake is a reservoir on the Tennessee-Tombigbee Waterway in the U.S. state of Mississippi. It is impounded by the Jamie Whitten Lock and Dam. The lake is approximately nine miles long, between waterway mile markers 412 at the dam, and 421 near the entrance to the divide cut.
- The Tennessee–Tombigbee Waterway (popularly known as the "Tenn-Tom") is a 234-mile (377 km) artificial waterway that provides a connecting link between the Tennessee and Tombigbee rivers. The waterway begins at Pickwick Lake on the Tennessee River, then flows southward through northeast Mississippi and west Alabama, finally connecting with the established Warrior-Tombigbee navigation system at Demopolis, Alabama.

== Communities ==
=== City ===
- Iuka (county seat)

=== Towns ===
- Belmont
- Burnsville
- Golden
- Tishomingo

=== Villages ===
- Paden

=== Census-designated place ===
- Dennis

=== Unincorporated communities ===
- Bloody Springs
- Doskie
- Eastport
- Midway
- Mingo
- Oldham
- Pittsburg
- Short

=== Ghost town ===
- Holcut

== Government and politics ==
=== Board of supervisors ===
- Eric Booker, District 1
- Nicky McRae, District 2
- Michael Busby, District 3
- Jeff Holt, District 4
- Greg Collier, District 5

=== Sheriff ===
- Jamie Stuart

=== Constable ===
- Wesley Wellington
- Donald Ray Thomas

=== Chancery Clerk ===
- Peyton Cummings

=== Circuit Clerk ===
- Rebecca Oaks

=== State representatives ===
- Representative Lester Carpenter, Mississippi House of Representatives - District 1
- Representative Mark DuVall, Mississippi House of Representatives - District 19
- Senator Eric Powell, Mississippi State Senate - District 4
- Senator Daniel Sparks, Mississippi State Senate - District 5

=== Presidential election results ===
Tishomingo County is solidly Republican at the Presidential level, having last voted for a Democrat in 1992 when it voted for Bill Clinton. Since then the closest a Democrat has come to winning the county was in 1996 when Clinton narrowly lost to Bob Dole. In 2024 Donald Trump received 89.1 percent of the vote, the best result for a Republican since 1972 when Richard Nixon received 89.2 percent of the vote.

United States presidential election results for Tishomingo County, Mississippi
Year	Republican		Democratic		Third party(ies)	
Year	No.	%	No.	%	No.	%
1912	65	7.19%	701	77.54%	138	15.27%
1916	175	14.29%	1,031	84.16%	19	1.55%
1920	387	30.98%	841	67.33%	21	1.68%
1924	279	19.11%	1,181	80.89%	0	0.00%
1928	585	37.74%	965	62.26%	0	0.00%
1932	112	6.39%	1,636	93.27%	6	0.34%
1936	115	6.59%	1,619	92.83%	10	0.57%
1940	159	9.75%	1,463	89.75%	8	0.49%
1944	296	17.33%	1,412	82.67%	0	0.00%
1948	98	5.20%	711	37.74%	1,075	57.06%
1952	679	29.86%	1,595	70.14%	0	0.00%
1956	516	23.78%	1,577	72.67%	77	3.55%
1960	536	22.08%	1,222	50.35%	669	27.56%
1964	1,934	66.44%	977	33.56%	0	0.00%
1968	617	11.13%	358	6.46%	4,569	82.41%
1972	4,177	89.23%	443	9.46%	61	1.30%
1976	1,969	33.72%	3,734	63.95%	136	2.33%
1980	2,489	34.47%	4,595	63.63%	137	1.90%
1984	3,527	54.87%	2,879	44.79%	22	0.34%
1988	3,646	51.70%	3,378	47.90%	28	0.40%
1992	3,393	42.03%	3,910	48.44%	769	9.53%
1996	2,766	45.28%	2,709	44.34%	634	10.38%
2000	4,122	58.95%	2,747	39.29%	123	1.76%
2004	5,379	64.60%	2,846	34.18%	101	1.21%
2008	6,249	74.22%	1,962	23.30%	208	2.47%
2012	6,133	77.28%	1,643	20.70%	160	2.02%
2016	7,166	85.61%	999	11.93%	206	2.46%
2020	7,933	86.81%	1,059	11.59%	146	1.60%
2024	8,064	89.10%	921	10.18%	65	0.72%

== Education ==
All of the county is in Tishomingo County Schools.

Northeast Mississippi Community College is the community college for Tishomingo County.

== See also ==
- Battle of Iuka
- Natchez Trace Parkway
- National Register of Historic Places listings in Tishomingo County, Mississippi
- Woodall Mountain
