= List of Mississippi placenames of Native American origin =

The following list includes settlements, geographic features, and political subdivisions of Mississippi whose names are derived from Native American languages.

== Listings ==
=== State ===
- Mississippi – from an Algonquian language, probably Ojibwe, meaning "big river" (Ojibwe misiziibi).

=== Counties ===
- Amite County – either from French amitié ("friendship"), or Choctaw himmita ("young")
- Attala County
- Chickasaw County
- Choctaw County
  - Choctaw, Bolivar County, Mississippi
  - Choctaw, Neshoba County, Mississippi
- Coahoma County
- Coahoma
- Copiah County
- Issaquena County
  - Issaquena
- Itawamba County
- Neshoba County
  - Neshoba
- Noxubee County
- Oktibbeha County
- Panola County
- Pontotoc County
  - Pontotoc
- Tallahatchie County
- Tippah County
- Tishomingo County
- Tunica County
- Yalobusha County
- Yazoo County
  - Yazoo City
  - Little Yazoo

=== Settlements ===
- Acona – uncertain etymology
- Alamucha
- Arcola
- Arkabutla
- Bigbee and Bigbee Valley – shortened from Tombigbee
- Biloxi
- Bogue Chitto
  - Bogue Chitto, Lincoln County
  - Bogue Chitto River and several creeks named Bogue Chitto with headwaters in Hinds, Kemper, Noxubee, and Clarke Counties – from Choctaw bok (creek) and chito (big)
- Bolatusha
- Buckatunna
- Byhalia – uncertain etymology
- Bywy
  - By-Wy Creek
  - Bywy Creek
- Cayuga – named for the Cayuga, an Iroquois nation from New York
- Chatawa
- Cheraw – named for the Cheraw people of North Carolina
- Chiwapa
- Chulahoma
- Chunky
- Cohay
- Coila
- Conehatta
- Coosa
- Eastabuchie
- Escatawpa
- Eucutta
- Hiwannee
- Homochitto
- Hopoca – uncertain etymology
- Hushpuckena
- Itta Bena
- Ituma
- Iuka – uncertain etymology
- Kewanee – uncertain Choctaw etymology; uncertain relationship to Kewanee, Illinois as an anatopism
- Kokomo – named after Kokomo, Indiana, itself of uncertain etymology
- Kolola Springs
- Looxahoma
- Mantachie
- Mashulaville
- Michigan City – named after Michigan
- Mingo – named after the Chickasaw word for chief, not the Mingo tribe
- Mississippi City
- Muskegon – named after Muskegon, Michigan
- Nanachehaw (Allen)
- Napanee – uncertain etymology
- Natchez
- New Houlka
- Nitta Yuma
- Noxapater
- Ocobla
- Ofahoma
- Okahola
- Oklahoma
- Okolona
- Oktoc
- Oswego – named for Oswego, New York
- Osyka
- Pachuta
- Pascagoula
- Pelahatchie
- Pocahontas – named after a Powhatan individual from Virginia
- Poticaw Landing – uncertain etymology
- Quofaloma
- Sabougla
- Sapa – very uncertain etymology
- Saratoga – named for Saratoga, New York
- Satartia
- Scooba
- Senatobia
- Shoccoe – named for Shocco Creek, North Carolina, itself of Catawba etymology
- Shongelo
- Shubuta
- Shuqualak
- Sipsey Fork
- Skuna
- Sucarnoochee
- Suqualena
- Tallahala
- Tallula
- Talowah
- Tamola
- Tawanta – very uncertain etymology
- Tchula
- Teoc
- Texas – named for Texas, which has Caddoan etymology
- Tibbee
- Tillatoba
- Tippo
- Tishomingo
- Toccopola
- Tocowa
- Toomsuba
- Topeka – named for Topeka, Kansas
- Topisaw
- Tougaloo – likely derived from Choctaw for "two creeks" or "second creek" and unrelated to the Cherokee Tugaloo
- Tula
- Tunica and North Tunica
- Tupelo
- Tuscola
- Wahalak
- Wautubbee
- Wenasoga – very uncertain etymology
- Winona – named Winona, Minnesota, itself named after a Dakota individual
- Yokena

=== Bodies of water ===
- Abiaca Creek
- Abotcaputa Creek
- Alampa Creek
- Alamuchee Creek
- Amite River
- Apookta Creek
- Archusa Creek
- Arkabutla Creek and Arkabutla Lake
- Lake Atchafalaya (Atchafalaya Bayou, Silver City, Mississippi)
- Bagasha Creek
- Bahala Creek
- Bala Chitto Creek
- Balucta Creek
- Batupan Bogue
- Bayou Costapia
- Bayou Talla (Hancock County) and Bayou Talla (Jackson County)
- Beasha Creek
- Besa Chitto Creek
- Bibalucta Creek
- Biba Wila Creek
- Biloxi River and Biloxi Bay
- Bodka Creek
- Big Bogue
- Big Scooba Creek, Little Scooba Creek, and Flat Scooba Creek
- Bogue Cheely
- Bogue Culley
- Bogue Ealiah Creek, Boguefala Creek, Boque Falia Creek, Bogue Faliah, Bogue Fallah, Bogue Flower (Lauderdale County), Bogue Flower (Clarke County), and Bogue Phalia – from Choctaw bok (creek) and falaa (long)
- Bogue Falema Creek
- Bogue Hasty
- Bogue Homo, Bogue Homo & Bogue Homo Lake, and Bogue Homa – from Choctaw bok (creek) and homma (red)
- Bogue Statinea
- Boguegaba Creek
- Bokshenya Creek
- Bolatusha Creek
- Bolingchessa Creek
- Bollybusha Creek
- Bophumpa Creek
- Bose Nukse Creek
- Boughenia Creek
- Buckatunna Creek and Buckatunna Lake
- Busfaloba Creek
- Butputter Creek – uncertain etymology
- Buttahatchee River
- Byhalia Creek
- Calabrella Creek
- Canna Creek
- Castaffa Creek
- Catahoula Creek
- Catalpa Creek
- Chautauqua Lake & Lake Chautauqua – named after Chautauqua Lake in New York, which has Iroquoian origin.
- Chenokaby Creek, an older name for Scotchenflipper Creek
- Chewalla Creek and Chewalla Lake – from Chickasaw chowaala (cedar); Chewawah Creek is possibly a corrupted form of that same etymology
- Chicago Branch – named for Chicago, itself derived from a Great Lakes Algonquian language.
- Chickasaw Bayou and Chickasaw Hill
- Chickasawhay River and Chickasawhay Creek
- Chicopa Creek
- Chicwillasaw Creek
- Chief Chisca Lake
- Chilli Creek
- Chinchahoma Creek
- Chittobochiah Creek and its historic name, Ittobechi Creek.
- Chiwapa Creek
- Chubby Creek (Itawamba County) and Chubby Creek (Benton County)
- Chunky Creek and Chunky River
- Chuquatonchee Creek
- Coffadeliah Creek
- Coffee Bogue
- Coila Creek
- Comite Creek – very uncertain etymology
- Concobona Creek
- Conehatta Creek
- Conehoma Creek
- Coonewah Creek
- Coonipper Creek
- Coonshuck Creek
- Copiah Creek and Copiah Lake
- Cuffawa Creek
- Cushtusia Creek
- Escatawpa River
- Etehomo Creek
- Euclautubba Creek
- Eucutta Creek and Eutacutachee Creek
- Fannegusha Creek, Fannegusha Creek, and Old Fannegusha Creek
- Funny Creek and Funny Yockana Creek
- Hashuqua Creek
- Hatchapaloo Creek
- Hatchie River – related to the common root word for "river" in Muscogean languages, such as Choctaw hvcha or hacha and Creek hvtce; however, the river is located within traditional Chickasaw homeland of North Mississippi, and the modern Chickasaw word for river is abookoshi’, suggesting that either the name is a more recent appellation or that the Chickasaw language has diverged from Choctaw.
- Hickahala Creek
- Hobolochitto Creek
- Hobuck Creek
- Hollicar Creek
- Homochitto River
- Hontokalo Creek
- Hornolucka Creek
- Hotopha Creek
- Houlka Creek
- Hushpuckena River and Hushpuckena Creek
- Ichusa Creek
- Ishitubba Creek
- Jofuska Creek
- Kentawka Canal
- Kentuctah Creek
- Kenty Creek
- Kickapoo Lake – named after the Kickapoo people originally of the Illinois Country
- Kinterbish Creek
- Kittahutty Creek
- Lafomby Creek
- Lake Itawamba
- Lake Mohawk – named for the Mohawk, an Iroquois nation from New York
- Lake Monocnoc
- Lake Piomingo
- Lake Pushmataha
- Lake Sequoyah
- Lake Tallaha
- Lake Tangipahoa
- Lake Tiak-O'Khata
- Lappatubby Creek
- Little Bogue
- Loakfoma Creek and Loakfoma Lake
- Lobutcha Creek
- Lonsilocher Canal
- Lucknuck Creek
- Lukfapa Creek
- Luneluah Creek
- Luxapallila Creek
- Magowah Creek
- Mantachie Creek
- Mattubby Creek
- Minga Branch (Monroe County), Mingo Branch (Tishomingo County), and Mingo Creek (Clarke County) – named after the Chickasaw minko’ (chief), not the Mingo people
- Minnehaha River (Magnolia, Mississippi) – named after the Minnehaha Falls in Minnesota
- Mississippi River and Mississippi Sound – from the Ojibwe 'Great River'
- Mubby Creek
- Nanabe Creek
- Nanih Waiya Creek
- Natchez Island and Natchez Lake
- Neshoba County Lake
- Nita Lake
- Nonconnah Creek, in Tennessee and slightly within Marshall County, Mississippi
- Noxapater Creek
- Noxubee River
- Nuakfuppa Creek
- Nusichiya Creek, an older name for Line Creek
- Oaklimeter Creek
- Oakohay Creek
- Oak Slush Creek, previously Okshash Creek
- Ocobla Creek
- Okachickima Creek
- Okahatta Creek
- Okannatie Creek
- Okatibbee Creek and Okatibbee Lake
- Okatoma Creek
- Okatuppa Creek
- Okeelala Creek
- Okhissa Lake
- Oktibbeha County Lake
- Oktibee Creek
- Oktoc Creek
- Okwakee Creek
- Otak Creek
- Otoucalofa Creek
- Pachuta Creek
- Palusha Creek Canal
- Pascagoula River and Pascagoula Bay
- Pawticfaw Creek
- Peachahala Creek
- Pechahalee Creek
- Pee Dee Creek – named after the Pee Dee River in South Carolina
- Pelahatchie Creek and Pelahatchie Bay
- Pellaphalia Creek
- Pelucia Creek and Pelucia Bayou
- Penantly Creek
- Pinishook Creek
- Ponta Creek
- Pontotoc Ridge
- Potacocowa Creek
- Poticaw Bayou
- Potlockney Creek
- Potterchitto Creek
- Pottock Creek
- Puchshinnubie Creek
- Pushacoona Creek
- Pushepatapa Creek
- Puskus Creek and Puskus Lake
- Quarterliah Creek
- Quilby Creek
- Sabougla Creek
- Sanoosee Creek, historical name of Snoody Creek; also Sanooda Creek
- Santee Branch – either from Choctaw santi (snake) or named after the Santee River in South Carolina, which was itself named after the Santee tribe
- Scoobachita Creek
- Scutchalo Creek and Scutchalo Falls
- Senatobia Creek
- Seneasha Creek
- Sewayiah Creek
- Shackaloa Creek
- Shaui Koli Creek
- Shiola Creek
- Shockaloo Creek
- Shongelo Creek and Shongelo Lake
- Shubuta Creek
- Shutispear Creek
- Sipsey Creek
- Skillikalia Bayou
- Skuna River
- Socki Creek
- Soctahoma Creek
- Souenlovie Creek
- Sowashee Creek
- Sucarnoochee River
- Sucatolba Creek
- Sugar Bogue
- Suqualena Creek
- Tallabinnela Creek
- Tallabogue Creek (Clarke County), Tallabogue (northern Scott County), and Tallabogue (southern Scott County)
- Tallachula Creek
- Tallahaga Creek
- Tallahala Creek and Tallahalla Creek
- Tallahatchie River
- Tallahatta Creek and Tallahattah Creek
- Tallahoma Creek
- Tallashua Creek
- Tampa Creek
- Tangipahoa River
- Tarlechia Creek
- Tarlow Creek
- Tchoutacabouffa River
- Tchula Lake
- Tennessee River
- Teoc Creek (Kemper County), Teoc Creek (Carroll County), and Teock Creek
- Teoctalia Creek
- Tesheva Creek
- Tibbee Creek, Tibbee Lake, Tibby Creek Attala County, and Tibby Creek
- Tibbehoy Creek
- Tickfaw River
- Tifallili Creek
- Tilda Bogue
- Tillatoba Creek and Tillatoba Lake
- Tippah River
- Tippo Bayou
- Tishkill Creek
- Tishomingo Creek
- Tishtony Creek
- Toby Tubby Creek
- Toccopola Creek
- Tokeba Bayou
- Tombigbee River
- Tonacana Creek
- Toomsuba Creek
- Topashaw Creek
- Topisaw Creek
- Tubbalubba Creek
- Tubby Creek
- Tuckabum Creek
- Tumbaloo Creek
- Tunica Hills and Tunica Lake
- Tuscolameta Creek
- Tuscahoma Formation
- Tuscumbia River
- Tuxachanie Creek
- Upper Bogue
- Wahalak Creek
- Walkiah Bluff
- Waukomis Lake
- Wautubbee Formation
- Wingo Branch
- Yalobusha River
- Yamacrow Creek
- Yanubbee Creek
- Yazoo River
- Yockanookany River
- Yocona River
- Yoda Creek
- Yonaba Creek
- Yonkapin Lake

== See also ==
- List of place names in the United States of Native American origin
