= Teoc Creek =

Teoc Creek may refer to:

- Teoc Creek (Sucarnoochee River tributary), a stream in Mississippi
- Teoc Creek (Yalobusha River tributary), a stream in Mississippi

== See also ==
- Teock Creek
