= Tallabogue =

Tallabogue may refer to:

- Tallabogue (Leaf River tributary), a stream in Mississippi
- Tallabogue (Tuscolameta Creek tributary), a stream in Mississippi
- Tallabogue Creek (Chickasawhay River tributary), a stream in Mississippi
