= Mingo Creek =

Mingo Creek may refer to:

- Mingo Creek (Monongahela River), Pennsylvania, a tributary of Monongahela River
  - Mingo Creek Viaduct
- Mingo Creek (Schuylkill River tributary), Pennsylvania
- Mingo Creek (Mississippi), a stream in Mississippi
- Mingo Creek (St. Francis River), a stream in Missouri
- Mingo Creek (South Grand River), a stream in Missouri

== See also ==
- Minga Branch
- Mingo Branch
