= Bophumpa Creek =

Stream in Holmes County, Mississippi, U.S.

Bophumpa Creek is a stream in Holmes County in the U.S. state of Mississippi. It is a tributary to Fannegusha Creek.

The stream headwaters arise at 33°12′18″N 89°56′56″W at an elevation of approximately 420 feet. The stream flows generally westward for approximately six miles through a rural area passing under Mississippi Highway 17 one mile north of the community of Lebanon to its confluence with Fannegusha Creek at 33°12′33″N 90°04′09″W at elevation of 197 feet.

Bophumpa Creek is a name derived from the Choctaw language purported to mean either "rain creek" or "pawpaw creek". A variant name is "Sweet Water Creek".
