= Robinhood, Mississippi =

- Census-designated place
- Location within Mississippi Location within the United States
- Coordinates: 32°12′16″N 89°58′02″W
- Country: United States
- State: Mississippi
- County: Rankin

Area
  - Total: 5.27 sq mi (13.64 km^{2})
  - Land: 5.08 sq mi (13.16 km^{2})
  - Water: 0.19 sq mi (0.48 km^{2})
- Elevation: 400 ft (120 m)

Population (2020)
  - Total: 1,491
  - Density: 293.5/sq mi (113.33/km^{2})
- Time zone: UTC-6 (Central (CST))
  - Summer (DST): UTC-5 (CDT)
- Area codes: 601 & 769
- GNIS feature ID: 2586609

Robinhood is an unincorporated community and census-designated place in Rankin County, Mississippi, United States. Per the 2020 census, the population was 1,491.

== History ==
The community is centered around Robinhood Lake, one of five lakes in the community. The lakes were formed by dams that were constructed in the early 1960s by damming up tributaries of Tumbaloo Creek. In 2011, Tropical Storm Lee damaged one of the earthen dams in Robinhood.

== Geography ==
According to the U.S. Census Bureau, the community has an area of 5.266 square miles (13.64 km^{2}); 5.080 square miles (13.16 km^{2}) of its area is land, and 0.186 square miles (0.48 km^{2}) is water.

== Demographics ==
Historical population
Census	Pop.	Note	%±
2010	1,605		—
2020	1,491		−7.1%
U.S. Decennial Census; 2010 2020

Robinhood first appeared as a census designated place in the 2010 U.S. census.

=== 2020 census ===
Robinhood CDP, Mississippi – Racial and ethnic composition Note: the US Census treats Hispanic/Latino as an ethnic category. This table excludes Latinos from the racial categories and assigns them to a separate category. Hispanics/Latinos may be of any race.
Race / Ethnicity (NH = Non-Hispanic)	Pop 2010	Pop 2020	% 2010	% 2020
White alone (NH)	1,474	1,291	91.84%	86.59%
Black or African American alone (NH)	31	43	1.93%	2.88%
Native American or Alaska Native alone (NH)	13	3	0.81%	0.20%
Asian alone (NH)	3	4	0.19%	0.27%
Pacific Islander alone (NH)	0	0	0.00%	0.00%
Some Other Race alone (NH)	1	5	0.06%	0.34%
Mixed Race or Multi-Racial (NH)	18	79	1.12%	5.30%
Hispanic or Latino (any race)	65	66	4.05%	4.43%
Total	1,605	1,491	100.00%	100.00%
