= Mississippi Wetlands Management District =

United States National Wildlife Refuge complex in Mississippi

Coordinates: 33.788037°N 89.864459°W

Mississippi Wetlands Management District is a National Wildlife Refuge complex in the state of Mississippi. It was established in 1989 and manages lands in 26 counties in the northern part of the state.

== Refuges within the complex ==
- Dahomey National Wildlife Refuge
- Tallahatchie National Wildlife Refuge
