= Mattubby Creek =

Stream in Mississippi, U.S.

Coordinates: 33.8306694°N 88.5330995°W

Mattubby Creek is a stream in the U.S. state of Mississippi.

Mattubby is a name derived from the Chickasaw language purported to mean "the one who kills all". Variant names are "Mattuby Creek", "Matubba Creek", "Matubbie Creek", and "Matubby Creek".
