= Tubbalubba Creek =

Stream in Mississippi, United States

Coordinates: 34.0823317°N 88.6614386°W

Tubbalubba Creek is a stream in the U.S. state of Mississippi.

The name "Tubbalubba" is either (sources vary) derived from the Choctaw language meaning "where the beans have been rooted up" or the Chickasaw language meaning "ravine tree, gully tree". Variant names are "Tucceluba Creek" and "Tuckalubba Creek".
