= Cohay, Mississippi =

- Unincorporated community
- Location within Mississippi Location within the United States
- Coordinates: 31°55′42″N 89°35′49″W
- Country: United States
- State: Mississippi
- County: Smith
- Elevation: 354 ft (108 m)
- Time zone: UTC-6 (Central (CST))
  - Summer (DST): UTC-5 (CDT)
- Area codes: 601 & 769
- GNIS feature ID: 691777

Cohay is an unincorporated community in Smith County, in the U.S. state of Mississippi.

== History ==
The community derives its name from alteration of the last two syllables of nearby Oakohay Creek. A post office called Cohay was established in 1915, and remained in operation until 1937.

In 1915, the Eastman, Gardiner, and Company moved their main lumber camp from Wisner, Mississippi (west of Taylorsville to Cohay. The name Cohay was eventually given to two additional lumber camps (known as Cohay II and Cohay III). Cohay once had 1,000 residents, many who lived in red modular homes. The community had a general store, drug store, YMCA and two schools.

After the community was established, the Eastman, Gardiner and Company operated a waterworks to supply water to its citizens. The lumber company also hosted weekly movies and Chautauqua lectures.
