= Tallahatchie National Wildlife Refuge =

United States National Wildlife Refuge in Mississippi

- IUCN category IV (habitat/species management area)
- Interactive map of Tallahatchie National Wildlife Refuge
- Location: Grenada County, Tallahatchie County, Mississippi, U.S.
- Nearest city: Holcomb, Mississippi
- Coordinates: 33°48′08″N 90°06′18″W
- Area: 4,199 acres (16.99 km^{2})
- Established: 1991
- Governing body: U.S. Fish and Wildlife Service
- Website: Tallahatchie National Wildlife Refuge

The Tallahatchie National Wildlife Refuge was established in 1991 and consists of 4,199 acres (16.99 km^{2}) in Grenada and Tallahatchie counties. Topography is relatively flat and land has been subject to extensive clearing and drainage for commodity crops, including cotton before and after the Civil War. Upon acquisition the refuge lands consisted mostly of agricultural fields. Since then, nearly 1,300 acres (5.3 km^{2}) have been reforested. The unit's largest continuous tract is a patchwork of cultivated farmlands, old fields, and small scattered hardwood bottomland forests bisected by the meandering Tippo Bayou, which is its centerpiece.

The old oxbows and low-lying fields along Tippo Bayou flood each winter and attract large concentrations of waterfowl. Wood ducks abound here. The unit also has a very healthy deer herd. Peregrine falcons, bald eagles, merlin, least tern, black tern and wood storks occasionally pass through the refuge in migration. Eastern screech owls, barred owls, great horned owls, loggerhead shrikes, and red-tailed hawks are common year-round residents. Blue grosbeaks, dickcissels, and painted buntings can be seen during the summer months. Most of the agricultural land of the area is devoted to raising soybeans and rice, for the benefit of waterfowl. The refuge is complemented on the south by the 9,483-acre (38.38 km^{2}) Malmaison Wildlife Management Area managed by the State of Mississippi.
