= Tallahatta Creek =

Stream in Mississippi, United States

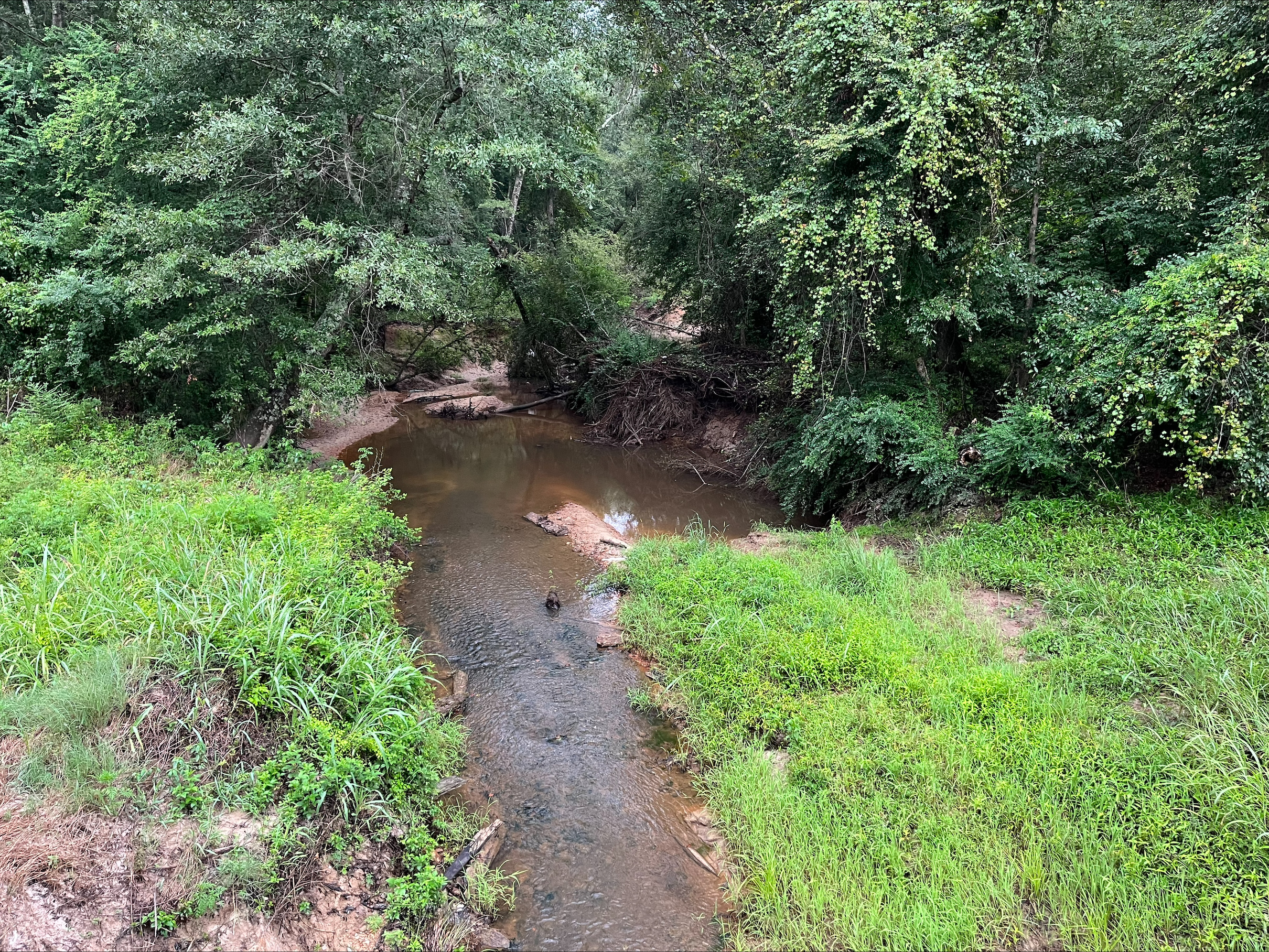
- Tallahatta Creek in Newton County, Mississippi

Location
- Country: United States
- State: Mississippi

Physical characteristics
- Source
  - coordinates: 32.6226372°N 88.9339426°W
- Mouth
  - coordinates: 32.3065333°N 88.8822732°W
- Length: 31.2 mi (50.2 km)
- Basin size: 70.2 sq mi (182 km^{2})

Tallahatta Creek is a stream in the U.S. state of Mississippi. It is a tributary of the Chunky River. Tributaries of Tallahatta Creek include Bogue Flower and Bogue Statinea.

Tallahatta is a name derived from the Choctaw language meaning "white rock". A variant name is "Tallyhatta Creek".

During William Tecumseh Sherman's Meridian campaign, Major General James B. McPherson ordered troops under the command of Brigadier General Alexander Chambers to defend a train bridge over Tallahatta Creek. This bridge allowed the Union Army to remain supplied during the destruction of Meridian.
