= Chilli Creek =

Stream in Mississippi, U.S.

Coordinates: 34.7173193°N 89.2367390°W

Chilli Creek is a stream in the U.S. state of Mississippi.

Chilli Creek is a name derived from either the Choctaw language or Chickasaw language, but scholars are divided whether it means "creek branch" or "dry river".
