= Boguegaba Creek =

Stream in Mississippi, U.S.

Coordinates: 34.0773305°N 88.4628222°W

Boguegaba Creek is a stream in the U.S. state of Mississippi.

Boguegaba Creek is a name derived from either the Choctaw language or Chickasaw language. A variant name is "Bogue Eucaba Creek". The long-standing traditional local name for the creek is derived from the variant form, pronounced [bˈo͡ʊ jˈuːɡˈæbi].
