= Chewawah Creek =

Stream in Mississippi, U.S.

Coordinates: 33.7973379°N 88.9739478°W

Chewawah Creek is a stream in the U.S. state of Mississippi. It is a tributary to Cane Creek.

Scholarly opinions are divided whether the name Chewawah is derived from the Chickasaw language meaning "cedar", or is a corruption of the name of the Mexican state of Chihuahua. Variant names are "Chemew Creek" and "Sawaha Creek".
