= Poticaw Landing, Mississippi =

- Unincorporated community
- Location within Mississippi Location within the United States
- Coordinates: 30°30′43″N 88°37′08″W
- Country: United States
- State: Mississippi
- County: Jackson
- Elevation: 10 ft (3.0 m)
- Time zone: UTC-6 (Central (CST))
  - Summer (DST): UTC-5 (CDT)
- GNIS feature ID: 692156

Poticaw Landing is an unincorporated community in Jackson County, in the U.S. state of Mississippi.

== History ==
The community takes its name from Poticaw Bayou, which flows past the site. Variant names are "Portico Landing" and "Portigo Landing".

The community is located on the Pascagoula River and is home to a boat ramp and bait shop.
