= Tubby Creek =

Stream in Mississippi, United States

Coordinates: 34.9031481°N 89.1431230°W

Tubby Creek is a stream in the U.S. state of Mississippi.

Tubby is a name derived from the Chickasaw language purported to mean either "to kill" or "white".
