= Shongelo, Mississippi =

- Ghost town
- Location within Mississippi Location within the United States
- Coordinates: 32°06′11″N 89°30′47″W
- Country: United States
- State: Mississippi
- County: Smith
- Elevation: 545 ft (166 m)
- Time zone: UTC-6 (Central (CST))
  - Summer (DST): UTC-5 (CDT)
- Area codes: 601 & 769
- GNIS feature ID: 694776

Shongelo is a ghost town in Smith County, in the U.S. state of Mississippi.

== History ==
Shongelo was founded in the 1860s, and named after Shongelo Creek. The community formed around the grist mill of C. D. Austin. A post office called Shongelo was established in 1873, and remained in operation until 1921.

In 1900, Shongelo had a population of 20. By 1923, the community was abandoned.

A historical marker describes the community and is located at the entrance to Shongelo Lake.
