= Hatchapaloo Creek =

Stream in Mississippi, U.S.

Coordinates: 31.9051585°N 89.5761809°W

Hatchapaloo Creek is a stream in the U.S. state of Mississippi. It is a tributary to Oakohay Creek.

Hatchapaloo is a name derived from the Choctaw language purported to mean either "creek where fish are caught" or "creek consisting of two branches". A variant name is "Hatchapalog Creek".
