= Lappatubby Creek =

Stream in Mississippi

Coordinates: 34.4317698°N 89.1289571°W

- Etymology: from Choctaw "lappita ubi", meaning "buck killer"

Lappatubby Creek is a stream in the U.S. state of Mississippi.

Lappatubby is a name derived from a Native American language (Choctaw or Chickasaw) purported to mean "buck killer". A variant name is "Lappatuppy Creek".
