= Tishtony Creek =

Stream in Mississippi, United States

Coordinates: 34.2942717°N 88.5044929°W

Tishtony Creek is a stream in the U.S. state of Mississippi.

Tishtony is a name derived from the Chickasaw language purported to mean "assistant guardian, assistant to a person in charge". A variant name is "Hatchiepeloc Creek".
