= Pechahalee Creek =

Stream in Mississippi, United States

Coordinates: 34.6164884°N 89.2414615°W

Pechahalee Creek is a stream in the U.S. state of Mississippi.

The origin of the name "Pechahalee Creek" is unclear. Pechahalee may be a name derived from the Chickasaw language signifying "splash, spray".
