= Kittahutty Creek =

Stream in Mississippi, U.S.

Coordinates: 34°01′53″N 89°12′11″W

Kittahutty Creek is a stream in the U.S. state of Mississippi. It is a tributary to the Skuna River.

Kittahutty is a name derived from either the Choctaw language or Chickasaw language.
