= Topisaw, Mississippi =

Unincorporated region in Pike County, Mississippi, US

- Unincorporated community
- Location within Mississippi Location within the United States
- Coordinates: 31°17′24″N 90°16′23″W
- Country: United States
- State: Mississippi
- County: Pike
- Elevation: 351 ft (107 m)
- Time zone: UTC-6 (Central (CST))
  - Summer (DST): UTC-5 (CDT)
- Area code: 601
- GNIS feature ID: 692271

Topisaw is an unincorporated community in Pike County, in the U.S. state of Mississippi.

== History ==
The community takes its name from Topisaw Creek, which flows near the site. Topisaw Creek is derived from the Otapasso tribe that lived in the area. A variant name is "Carters Creek". A post office called Topisaw was established in 1880, and remained in operation until 1905. In 1900, Topisaw had a population of 46.

The Topisaw Church, also known as Felder Church, originally started as a camp meeting in 1845.
