= Nita Lake =

- Location within Mississippi Location within the United States
- Location: Itawamba County, Mississippi
- Coordinates: 34°13′14″N 88°18′32″W
- Type: reservoir
- Etymology: Chickasaw language meaning "bear"
- Basin countries: United States
- Surface elevation: 390 ft (120 m)

Nita Lake is a reservoir in the U.S. state of Mississippi.

Nita is a name derived from the Chickasaw language meaning "bear".
