= Toccopola Creek =

Stream in Mississippi, United States

Coordinates: 34.2442744°N 89.2856291°W

Toccopola Creek is a stream in the U.S. state of Mississippi.

Toccopola Creek took its name from an old Indian village which once stood in the area; its name in turn is derived from the Chickasaw language purported to mean "dismal prairie".
