= Mingo, Mississippi =

Unincorporated community in Mississippi, US

Coordinates: 34°37′55″N 88°09′01″W

Mingo is an unincorporated community in Tishomingo County, Mississippi, in the United States.

== History ==
Mingo was named for the Mingo Branch, upon which it is located.
