= Lafomby Creek =

Stream in Mississippi, U.S.

Coordinates: 34.5137150°N 89.6556405°W

Lafomby Creek is a stream in the U.S. state of Mississippi.

Lafomby is a name possibly derived from the Chickasaw language, purported to mean "red". A variant name is "Lafomba Creek".
