= Hickahala Creek =

Stream in Mississippi, United States

Coordinates: 34.7081570°N 90.0303691°W

Hickahala Creek is a stream in the U.S. state of Mississippi.

Hickahala is a name derived from the Choctaw language or Chickasaw language meaning "sweetgum tree". Variant names are "Hicaholahala", "Hicaholahia", "Hickahall", and "Hickahate".
