= Lake Monocnoc =

- Location within Mississippi Location within the United States
- Location: Washington County, Mississippi
- Coordinates: 33°23′47″N 90°52′51″W
- Type: lake
- Basin countries: United States
- Surface elevation: 118 ft (36 m)

Lake Monocnoc is a lake in the U.S. state of Mississippi.

The name "Lake Monocnoc" may be a transfer from Monocanock Island, in Pennsylvania.
