= Tallabinnela Creek =

Stream in Monroe County, Mississippi, U.S.

Coordinates: 34.0820539°N 88.6608829°W

Tallabinnela Creek is a stream in Monroe County, Mississippi. The creek is 64 meters or 210 feet elevated.

Tallabinnela is a name derived from the Choctaw language or the Chickasaw language purported to mean (sources vary) "place where stone rests" or "the rock to get over". A variant name is "Talebenela Creek".
