= Euclautubba Creek =

Tributary to Mud Creek

Coordinates: 34.3389934°N 88.6981090°W

Euclautubba Creek is a stream in the U.S. state of Mississippi. It is a tributary to Mud Creek.

Euclautubba is a name derived from either the Choctaw language or Chickasaw language purported to mean either "“killer of people" or "the one who captures and kills".
