= Sugar Bogue =

Stream in Mississippi, US

Coordinates: 32.4440309°N 89.6589620°W

Sugar Bogue is a stream in the U.S. state of Mississippi. It is a tributary to Coffee Bogue.

Sugar Bogue is a name corrupted from the Choctaw language and purported to have the original meaning "hog creek". A variant name is "Sugar Bogue Creek".
