= Hornolucka Creek =

Stream in Mississippi, U.S.

Coordinates: 34.7414814°N 88.5275506°W

Hornolucka Creek is a stream in the U.S. state of Mississippi. It is a tributary to Pollys Creek.

Hornolucka is a name derived from the Choctaw language or Chickasaw language.
