= Tarlechia Creek =

Stream in Mississippi, United States

Coordinates: 34.6398182°N 88.6125529°W

Tarlechia Creek is a stream in the U.S. state of Mississippi.

Tarlechia is a name derived from either the Choctaw language or Chickasaw language purported to mean either (sources vary) "place where palmettos are" or "where rocks are".
