= Potlockney Creek =

Stream in Mississippi, U.S.

Coordinates: 34.2623300°N 89.3889662°W

Potlockney Creek is a stream in the U.S. state of Mississippi.

Potlockney is a name derived from either the Choctaw language or Chickasaw language, but the original meaning is unclear. Variant names are "Patlocona Creek", "Pollocona Creek", "Potalockny Creek", "Potlocona Creek", "Potlocony Creek", "Potolocona Creek", and "Potolocony Creek".
