= Coonewah Creek =

Stream in Mississippi, U.S.

Coordinates: 34.1134423°N 88.6533831°W

Coonewah Creek is a stream in the U.S. state of Mississippi. It is a tributary to Town Creek.

Coonewah Creek is a name derived from the Choctaw language or possibly the Chickasaw language, but scholars do not agree on the original meaning of its native name. Variant names are "Colberts Creek" and "Coonewar Creek".
