= Bogue Culley =

Stream in Mississippi, U.S.

Coordinates: 33.7751164°N 88.8228310°W

Bogue Culley is a stream in the U.S. state of Mississippi.

Bogue Culley is a name derived from either the Choctaw language or Chickasaw language and it most likely means "spring creek". A variant name is "Bogue Gulley".
