= Ocobla, Mississippi =

Unincorporated community in Mississippi, US

- Unincorporated community
- Location within Mississippi Location within the United States
- Coordinates: 32°45′17″N 89°01′31″W
- Country: United States
- State: Mississippi
- County: Neshoba
- Elevation: 535 ft (163 m)
- Time zone: UTC-6 (Central (CST))
  - Summer (DST): UTC-5 (CDT)
- ZIP code: 39350
- Area code: 601
- GNIS feature ID: 675138

Ocobla is an unincorporated community in Neshoba County, in the U.S. state of Mississippi.

== History ==
The community takes its name from Ocobla Creek, which flows near the site. A post office called Ocobla was established in 1886, and remained in operation until 1903.
