= Hontokalo Creek =

Stream in Mississippi, United States

Coordinates: 32.5431950°N 89.4083999°W

Hontokalo Creek is a stream in the U.S. state of Mississippi.

Hontokalo is a name derived from the Choctaw language meaning "seven". Variant names are "Honlookato Creek" and "Utucklo Creek".
