= Concobona Creek =

Stream in Mississippi, United States

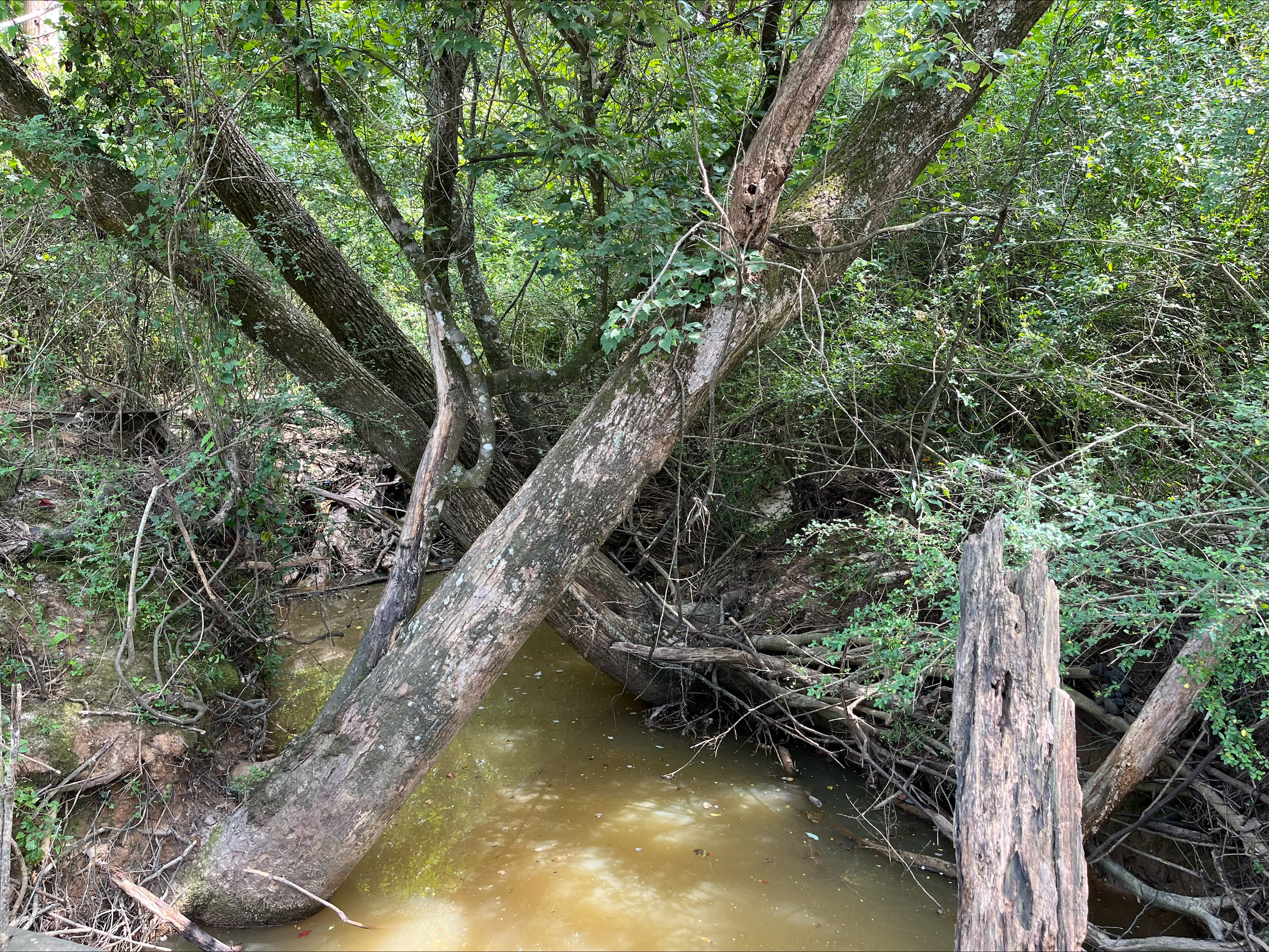
- Concobona Creek

Location
- Country: United States
- State: Mississippi

Physical characteristics
- Source
  - coordinates: 32.441808°N 89.1500591°W
- Mouth
  - coordinates: 32.3851427°N 89.123114°W
- Length: 5.2 mi (8.4 km)

Concobona Creek is a stream in the U.S. state of Mississippi. It is a tributary to Turkey Creek.

Concobona Creek is a name derived from the Choctaw language purported to mean either "chicken hawks go there " or "mallard duck".
