= Soctahoma Creek =

Stream in Mississippi, U.S.

Coordinates: 33.8995572°N 88.9733924°W

Soctahoma Creek is a stream in the U.S. state of Mississippi.

Soctahoma is a name derived from the Choctaw language meaning "red streambank; red hillside", a name which was descriptively applied to this stream on account of the red clay near its course.
