= Besa Chitto Creek =

Stream in Mississippi, U.S.

Coordinates: 33°16′13″N 89°17′54″W

Besa Chitto Creek is a stream in the U.S. state of Mississippi. It is a tributary to the Yockanookany River with a name derived from the Choctaw language meaning "blackberry big creek".
