= Bagasha Creek =

Stream in Mississippi, U.S.

Coordinates: 33°15′44″N 89°35′01″W

Bagasha Creek is a stream in the U.S. state of Mississippi. It is a tributary to Zilpha Creek.

Bagasha is a name derived from the Choctaw language meaning "small creek".
