= Eutacutachee Creek =

Stream in the state of Mississippi (U.S.)

Coordinates: 32.3329229°N 89.8392445°W

Eutacutachee Creek is a stream in the U.S. state of Mississippi.

Eutacutachee is a name derived from the Choctaw language purported to mean "chestnut little lake".
