= Chicopa Creek =

Stream in Mississippi, U.S.

Coordinates: 33.2637356°N 90.1409176°W

Chicopa Creek is a stream in the U.S. state of Mississippi.

Chicopa Creek is a name derived from the Choctaw language meaning "feather creek".
