= Nuakfuppa Creek =

Stream in Mississippi, U.S.

Coordinates: 31.9282102°N 89.1225572°W

Nuakfuppa Creek is a stream in the U.S. state of Mississippi.

Nuakfuppa is a name derived from the Choctaw language, and depending on source is purported to mean "oak tree" or "mudcat fish". Variant name is "Nucefuppa Creek".
