= Pawticfaw Creek =

Stream in Mississippi, U.S.

Coordinates: 32.6490241°N 88.4647591°W

Pawticfaw Creek is a stream in the U.S. state of Mississippi.

Pawticfaw is a name derived from the Choctaw language purported to mean "place where wild animals have shed their hair". Variant names are "Paticfaw Creek", "Patigfor Creek", "Pawticfow Creek", "Petickfa Creek", "Petickfaw", "Pettickfaw Creek", "Pettitickfaw Creek", "Pitticfaw", "Pittickfau Creek", "Pittiefaw", and "Poticfaw Creek".
