= Coonipper Creek =

Stream in Mississippi, U.S.

Coordinates: 31.9390415°N 88.6864301°W

Coonipper Creek is a stream in the U.S. state of Mississippi. It lies near the hamlets of Sumrall, Mississippi and De Soto, Mississippi and is situated at an elevation of approximately 51 meters (167 feet) above sea level.

Coonipper is a name derived from the Choctaw language purported to refer to the "name of a weed which grows in low grounds". A variant name is "Coonupy Creek".
