= Catalpa Creek =

Stream in Mississippi, United States

Coordinates: 33.5265082°N 88.5622672°W

Catalpa Creek is a stream in the U.S. state of Mississippi.

Catalpa Creek is a name derived from the Choctaw language purported to mean "dammed up or obstructed creek". Variant names are "Red Bull Creek" and "Tullapa Creek".
