= Upper Bogue =

Stream in Mississippi, U.S.

Coordinates: 33.9920530°N 90.8698264°W

Upper Bogue is a stream in the U.S. state of Mississippi.

Upper Bogue is a name partially derived from the Choctaw language meaning "upper creek".
