= Tampa Creek =

Stream in Mississippi, U.S.

Coordinates: 31.7768254°N 88.8647696°W

Tampa Creek is a stream in the U.S. state of Mississippi.

Tampa in this context may be a name derived from the Choctaw language; it's purported to mean "offal, refuse".
