= Tibby Creek (Yockanookany River tributary) =

Stream in Mississippi, United States

Coordinates: 33.2192927°N 89.3334033°W

Tibby Creek is a stream in the U.S. state of Mississippi. It is a tributary to the Yockanookany River.

Tibby is a name derived from the Choctaw language purported to mean either (sources vary) "icy creek" or "to fight". A variant name is "Tilby Creek".
