= Coonshuck Creek =

Stream in Mississippi, U.S.

Coordinates: 32.6868024°N 89.1253379°W

Coonshuck Creek is a stream in the U.S. state of Mississippi.

== Etymology ==
Coonshuck Creek is a name most likely derived from the Choctaw language; it's purported to mean "reed brake". A variant name is "Coonshark Creek".
