= Skillikalia Bayou =

Stream in Mississippi, U.S.

Coordinates: 32.4918077°N 90.8048249°W

Skillikalia Bayou is a stream in the U.S. state of Mississippi.

Skillikalia is a name derived from the Choctaw language purported to mean either (sources vary) "geese come there", "small white beads", or "sparrow-hawk". Variant names are "Skillet Goliah Bayou" and "Skilleteliah Creek".
