= Coffadeliah Creek =

Stream in Mississippi, United States

Coordinates: 32.8226322°N 88.9633899°W

Coffadeliah Creek is a stream in Neshoba County, located around the center of Mississippi. It is a tributary to Owl Creek, and is at an elevation of 137 meters, about 449 feet.

Coffadeliah is a name derived from the Choctaw language meaning "sassafras grove".
