= Pelahatchie Creek =

Stream in the U.S. state of Mississippi

Coordinates: 32.3848660°N 89.9995275°W

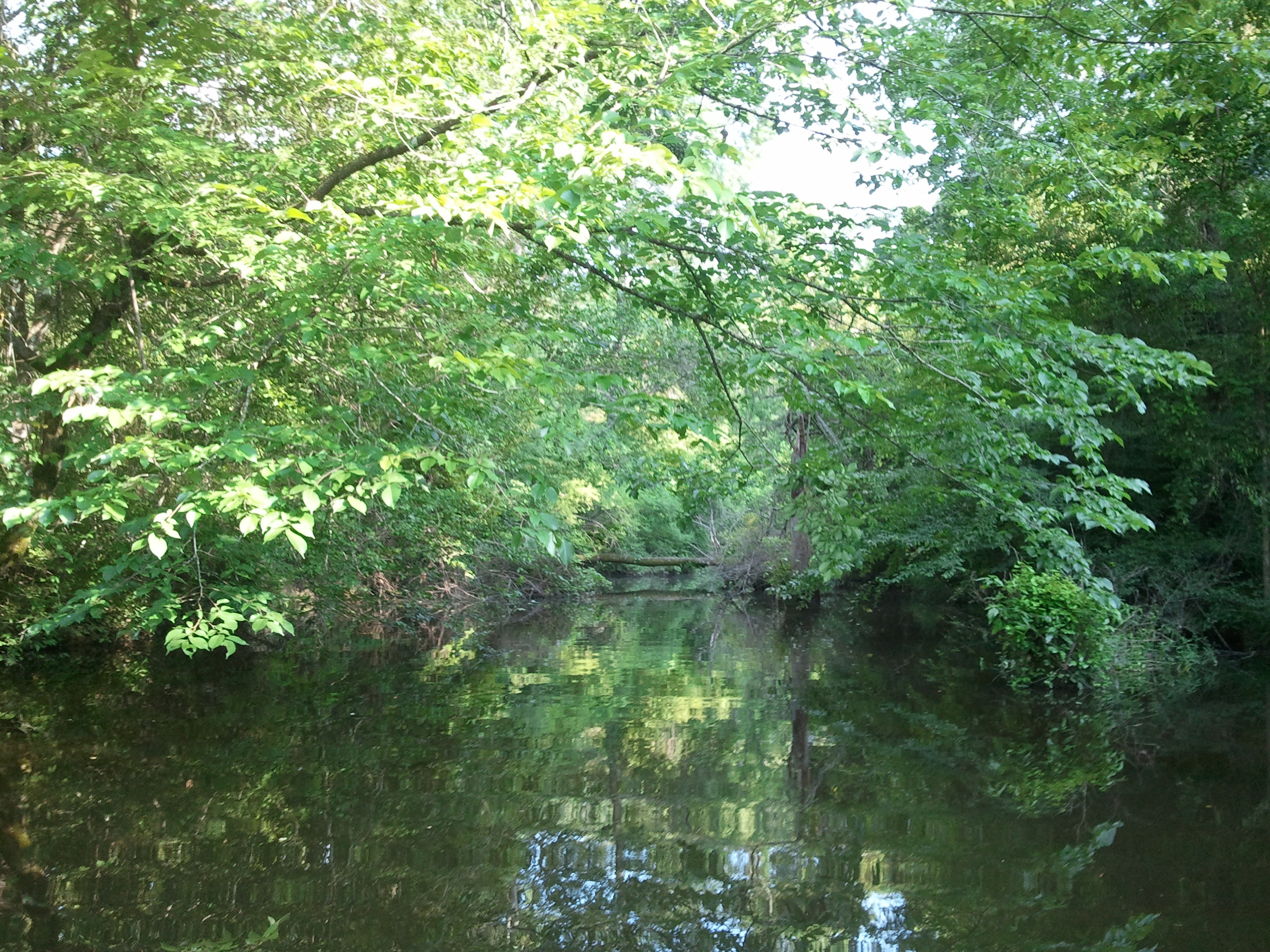
Pelahatchie Creek in May, 2012

Pelahatchie Creek is a stream in the U.S. state of Mississippi. Pelahatchie is a name derived from the Choctaw language purported to mean "place where a hurricane passed along and blew down the timber". Variant names are "Pelahatchee Creek" and "Pelahatches Creek".
