= Yamacrow Creek =

Stream in Mississippi, United States

Coordinates: 31.1318407°N 91.4587269°W

Yamacrow Creek is a stream in the U.S. state of Mississippi.

Yamacrow Creek most likely is named after the Yamacraw tribe, using a different spelling.
