= Potacocowa Creek =

Stream in Mississippi, U.S.

Coordinates: 33.6334516°N 90.1078628°W

Potacocowa Creek is a stream in the U.S. state of Mississippi.

Potacocowa Creek is a name derived from the Choctaw language purported to mean "broken sumac". A variant name is "Potacocowah Creek".
