= Yoda Creek =

Stream in Mississippi, United States

Coordinates: 33.9756672°N 89.3745202°W

Yoda Creek is a stream in the U.S. state of Mississippi.

Yoda is a name possibly derived from the Choctaw language and purported to mean "abode, domicile, habitation", but its etymology can not be stated with certainty.
