= Butputter Creek =

Coordinates: 33.8148380°N 89.6014702°W

Location
- Country: United States
- State: Mississippi

Butputter Creek is a stream in the U.S. state of Mississippi.

Butputter Creek is a name derived from the Choctaw language purported to mean "where the sumac is extensive".
