= Hotopha Creek =

Stream in Mississippi, United States

Coordinates: 34.3759409°N 89.8917560°W

Hotopha Creek is a stream in the U.S. state of Mississippi. It is a tributary to the Tallahatchie River.

Hotopha is a name derived from the Choctaw language purported to mean "grasshopper". A variant transliteration is "Hotipka Creek"
