= Peachahala Creek =

Stream in Mississippi, U.S.

Coordinates: 33.2567935°N 89.7236931°W

Peachahala Creek is a stream in the U.S. state of Mississippi.

Peachahala is a name derived from the Choctaw language purported to mean either (sources vary) "rat" or "sorrel weeds are standing there". Variant names are "Peachahallow Creek", "Peachalala Creek", "Peachallow", "Peachuhaley Creek", and "Pitchahala".
