= Quarterliah Creek =

Stream in Mississippi, U.S.

Coordinates: 32.1432050°N 89.2986742°W

Quarterliah Creek is a stream in the U.S. state of Mississippi.

Quarterlial is a name derived from the Choctaw language purported to mean "stagnant water". A variant name is "Quarterlial Creek".
