= Big Bogue =

Stream in Mississippi, U.S.

Coordinates: 33°41′10″N 89°43′30″W

Big Bogue is a stream in the U.S. state of Mississippi.

Big Bogue is a name derived from the Choctaw language meaning "big creek". Variant names are "Batupan Bogue", "Big Bogue Creek", and "Bogue Creek".
