= Socki Creek =

Stream in Mississippi, U.S.

Coordinates: 32.9237428°N 89.6006314°W

Socki Creek is a stream in the U.S. state of Mississippi.

Socki may be a word derived from the Choctaw language signifying "bank; bluff". A variant name is "Sock Creek".
