= Funny Creek =

Stream in Mississippi

Coordinates: 34.1459408°N 89.0706199°W

- Location within Mississippi
- Etymology: From the Choctaw language, meaning "squirrel"

Location
- Country: United States
- State: Mississippi

Physical characteristics
- Mouth: Skuna River

Basin features
- River system: Skuna River system

Funny Creek is a stream in the U.S. state of Mississippi. It is a tributary to the Skuna River.

Funny in this context is a name derived from the Choctaw language meaning "squirrel".
