= Bokshenya Creek =

Stream in the U.S. state of Mississippi

Coordinates: 32.9617977°N 89.5995206°W

Bokshenya Creek is a stream in the U.S. state of Mississippi.

Bokshenya Creek is a name derived from the Choctaw language meaning "crooked/twisted creek".
