= Tibbehoy Creek =

Stream in Mississippi, United States

Coordinates: 31.4887799°N 89.1842256°W

Tibbehoy Creek is a stream in the U.S. state of Mississippi.

Tibbehoy is a name derived from a Native American language but its meaning is unclear.
