= Flat Scooba Creek =

Stream in Mississippi, United States

Coordinates: 32.8104094°N 88.4769827°W

Flat Scooba Creek is a stream in the U.S. state of Mississippi.

Scooba is a name derived from the Choctaw language purported to mean "reed brake".
