= Ichusa Creek =

Stream in Mississippi, U.S.

Coordinates: 31°59′05″N 85°29′23″W

Ichusa Creek is a stream in the U.S. state of Mississippi. It is a tributary to the Leaf River.

Ichusa is a name derived from the Choctaw language meaning "little river". A variant name is "Hatchushe Creek".
