= Lebanon, Mississippi =

Lebanon
- Unincorporated community
- Interactive map of Lebanon
- Coordinates: 32.160°N 90.494°W
- Country: United States
- State: Mississippi
- County: Hinds
- Elevation: 300 ft (91 m)
- Time zone: UTC-6 (Central (CST))
  - Summer (DST): UTC-5 (CDT)
- Area codes: 601, 769

Lebanon is an unincorporated community located in Hinds County, Mississippi, United States.

Lebanon is situated in the southwestern region of Hinds County. It is located near Utica (7 miles to the southwest), Raymond (8 miles to the northeast), and Byram (14 miles to the east).

The community is home to Lebanon Presbyterian Church, which was built in 1854 and is listed on the National Register of Historic Places.
