= Monocanock Island =

Coordinates: 41°17′55″N 75°50′26″W

Monocanock Island is a river island in Luzerne County, Pennsylvania. It is located approximately 100 meters downriver from the George Dennis Memorial Bridge, which connects Jenkins Twp. and Wyoming Borough across the Susquehanna River.

The name Monocanock is derived from the Algonquian language and is said to mean "island place".
