= Chicago Branch =

Stream in Mississippi, U.S.

Coordinates: 31.9190481°N 90.8859365°W

Chicago Branch is a stream in the U.S. state of Mississippi.

The stream's name most likely is a transfer from Chicago, Illinois.
