= Pelucia Bayou =

Stream in Mississippi, U.S.

Coordinates: 33.5228981°N 90.1775838°W

Pelucia Bayou is a stream in the U.S. state of Mississippi.

Pelucia is a name derived from the Choctaw language purported to mean "flying squirrels are there". A variant name is "Palusha Bayou".
