= Wingo Branch =

Stream in Mississippi, U.S.

Coordinates: 34.6720409°N 88.8200587°W

Wingo Branch is a stream in the U.S. state of Mississippi.

Wingo is a name possibly corrupted from the Choctaw language meaning "chief".
