= Chief Chisca Lake =

- Location within Mississippi Location within the United States
- Location: DeSoto County, Mississippi
- Coordinates: 34°49′48″N 90°11′28″W
- Type: reservoir
- Basin countries: United States
- Surface elevation: 236 ft (72 m)

Chief Chisca Lake is a reservoir in the U.S. state of Mississippi.

Chisca is a name derived from the Creek language meaning "base of a tree".
