= Lonsilocher Canal =

Stream in Mississippi, U.S.

Coordinates: 32.6962466°N 89.1578390°W

Lonsilocher Canal is a stream in the U.S. state of Mississippi.

Lonsilocher is a name derived from the Choctaw language purported tom mean "border of a swamp" or "black swamp".
