= Puchshinnubie Creek =

Stream in Mississippi, U.S.

Coordinates: 33.5806751°N 90.0403622°W

Puchshinnubie Creek is a stream in the U.S. state of Mississippi.

Puchshinnubie Creek most likely was named after a Choctaw chieftain. Variant names are "Bucksnubby Branch", "Puchshennubee", "Puchshenubbie", "Puchshenubee", "Puchshenubie", "Puchshinnubie", "Puchshinubbie", "Puchshinubee", "Puchshinubie", "Puchshunerbie Creek", "Puckshennubie", "Puckshenubbie", "Puckshenubeev", "Puckshenubie", "Puckshinnubiev", "Puckshinubbie", "Puckshinubee", and "Puckshinubie Creek".
