= Hashuqua Creek =

Stream in Mississippi, USA

Coordinates: 33.1348480°N 88.664769°W

Hashuqua Creek is a stream in the U.S. state of Mississippi. It is a tributary to the Noxubee River.

Hashuqua is a name derived from the Choctaw language, purportedly meaning "grass grows". A variant name is "Hashhooker Creek" and "Hashugua Creek".
