= Chewalla Creek =

Stream in Mississippi, U.S.

Coordinates: 34.6592655°N 89.3295196°W

Chewalla Creek is a stream in the U.S. state of Mississippi. It is a tributary to the Tippah River.

Chewalla Creek is a name derived from the Choctaw language meaning "cedar creek".
