= Tishkill Creek =

Stream in Mississippi, United States

Coordinates: 32.1476504°N 89.4261776°W

Tishkill Creek is a stream in the U.S. state of Mississippi.

Tishkill is a name derived from the Choctaw language meaning "jaybird, bluejay".
