= Lake Itawamba =

- Location within Mississippi Location within the United States
- Location: Itawamba County, Mississippi
- Coordinates: 34°19′36″N 88°23′13″W
- Type: reservoir
- Etymology: Levi Colbert
- Basin countries: United States
- Surface elevation: 341 ft (104 m)

Lake Itawamba is a reservoir in the U.S. state of Mississippi.

Lake Itawamba derives its name from the Indian name of Levi Colbert, a Chickasaw leader.
