= Hollicar Creek =

Stream in Mississippi, U.S.

Coordinates: 31.9293203°N 88.8175470°W

Hollicar Creek is a stream in the U.S. state of Mississippi. It is a tributary to Shubuta Creek.

Hollicar is a name derived from the Choctaw language purported to mean "a sacred thing". Variant transliterations are "Hellicon Creek", "Hollicker Creek", and "Hullicar Creek".
