= Chinchahoma Creek =

Stream in Mississippi, U.S.

Coordinates: 33.3106795°N 88.8128316°W

Chinchahoma Creek is a stream in the U.S. state of Mississippi.

Chinchahoma Creek is a name derived from the Choctaw language. A variant name is "Chincka Homa Creek".
