= Pee Dee Creek (Mississippi) =

Stream in Mississippi, U.S.

Coordinates: 34.5420418°N 88.4031033°W

Pee Dee Creek is a stream in the U.S. state of Mississippi.

The name "Pee Dee" most likely is a transfer from the Pee Dee River, in The Carolinas, which in turn was named after the Pedee people.
