= Lukfapa Creek =

Stream in Mississippi, U.S.

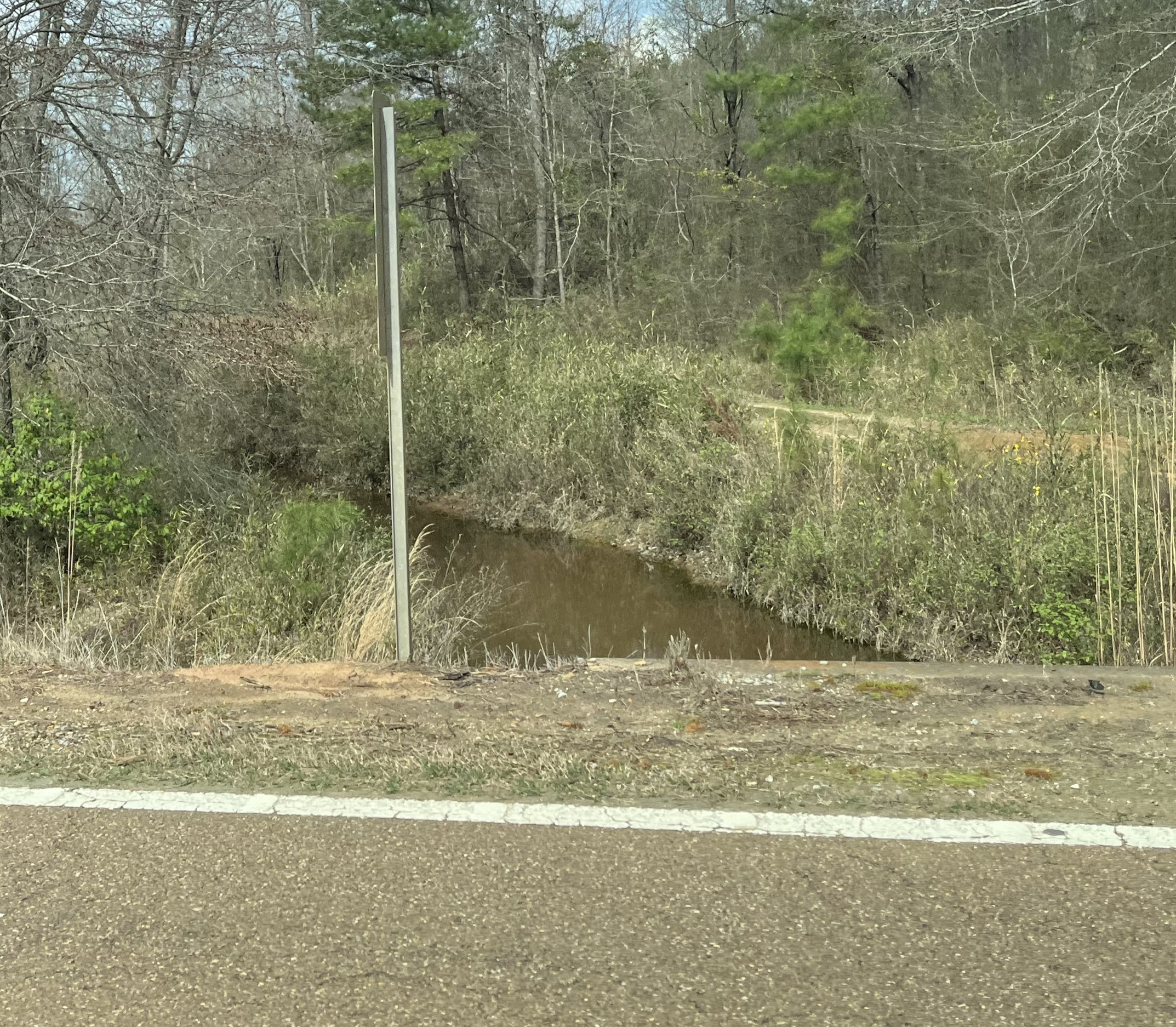
- Lukfapa Creek in Neshoba County, Mississippi

Location
- Country: United States
- State: Mississippi

Physical characteristics
- Source
  - coordinates: 32.9562411°N 89.2656239°W
- Mouth
  - coordinates: 32.2656239°N 89.2697886°W
- Length: 8.8 mi (14.2 km)
- Basin size: 16.5 mi^{2} (43 km^{2})

Lukfapa Creek is a stream in the U.S. state of Mississippi. It is a tributary to the Pearl River.

Lukfapa is a name derived from the Choctaw language. Variant names are "Coglans Mill Creek", "Lukfahata Creek" and "Lukfodder Creek".
