= Bayou Costapia =

Stream in Mississippi, U.S.

Coordinates: 30°29′29″N 88°53′05″W

Bayou Costapia is a stream in the U.S. state of Mississippi. It is a tributary to the Biloxi River.

Bayou Costapia is a name derived from the Choctaw language purported to mean "fleas are therein". A variant name is "Costapla Creek".
