= Mubby Creek =

Stream in Mississippi, U.S.

Coordinates: 34.1787187°N 88.8503342°W

Mubby Creek is a stream in the U.S. state of Mississippi.

Mubby is a name derived from the Choctaw language purported to mean "one who gives and kills". The name sometimes is rendered as "Muddy Creek".
