= Bolingchessa Creek =

Stream in Mississippi, U.S.

Coordinates: 31.9020977°N 88.5364213°W

Bolingchessa Creek is a stream in the U.S. state of Mississippi. It is a tributary to Hanging Moss Creek.

Bolingchessa Creek is a name derived from the Choctaw language meaning "place where there are strips of hickory bark".
