= Shiola Creek =

Stream in Mississippi, U.S.

Coordinates: 32.7615229°N 89.6806324°W

Shiola Creek is a stream in the U.S. state of Mississippi.

Shiola is a name derived from the Choctaw language purported to mean "dry".
