= Okhissa Lake =

- Location within Mississippi Location within the United States
- Location: Franklin County, Mississippi
- Coordinates: 31°25′10″N 90°49′51″W
- Type: reservoir
- Etymology: Choctaw language meaning "porter"
- Basin countries: United States
- Surface elevation: 292 ft (89 m)

Okhissa Lake is a reservoir in the U.S. state of Mississippi.

Okhissa is a name derived from the Choctaw language meaning "porter". The name is a play on words, as the lake impounds Porter Creek.
