= Luneluah Creek =

Stream in the U.S. state of Mississippi

Coordinates: 32.7834673°N 89.3020107°W

Luneluah Creek is a stream in the U.S. state of Mississippi. It is a tributary to Beasha Creek.

Luneluah Creek is a name derived from the Choctaw language purported to mean "burnt frog". A variant name is "Suneluah Creek".
