= Okannatie Creek =

Stream in Mississippi, United States

Coordinates: 34.4320475°N 89.1311793°W

Okannatie Creek is a stream in the U.S. state of Mississippi.

Okannatie is a name derived from the Choctaw language purported to mean "commencement of day". A variant name is "Oconitahatchie Creek".
