= Tallashua Creek =

Stream in Mississippi, United States

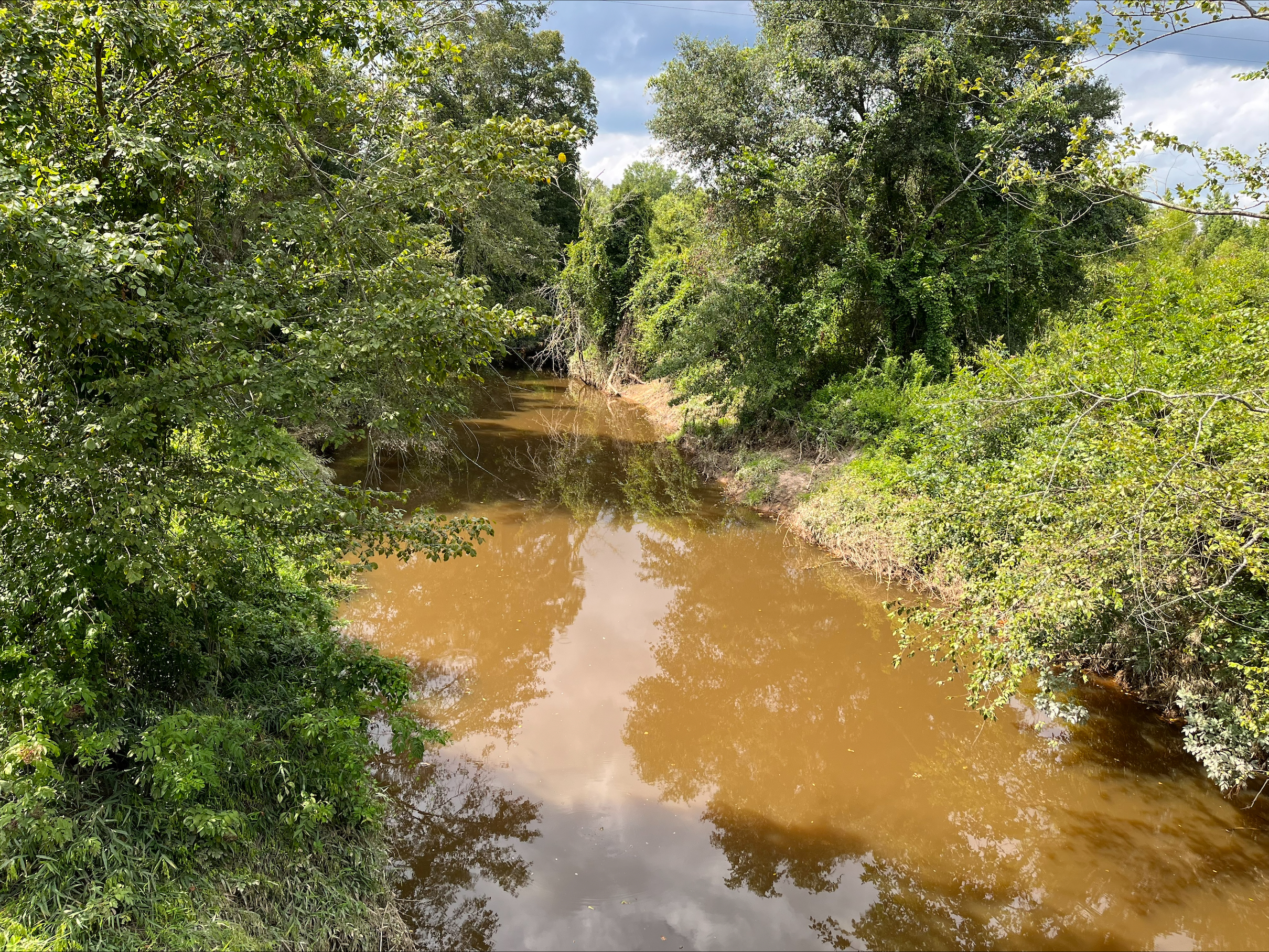
- Tallashua Creek in Newton County

Location
- Country: United States
- State: Mississippi

Physical characteristics
- Source
  - coordinates: 32.6365257°N 88.9608879°W
- Mouth
  - coordinates: 32.3943091°N 89.0003327°W
- Length: 22.63 mi (36.42 km)
- Basin size: 94.1 sq mi (244 km^{2})

Tallashua Creek is a stream in the U.S. state of Mississippi. It is a tributary to Chunky Creek.

Tallashua is a name derived from the Choctaw language meaning "palmettos are there". Variant names are "Talasha Creek", "Tallasher Creek", and "Tallashuah Creek".
