= Snoody Creek =

Stream in Mississippi, U.S.

Coordinates: 32.7654106°N 88.5725419°W

Snoody Creek is a stream in the U.S. state of Mississippi.

Snoody is a name derived from the Choctaw language purported to mean "deer sleep there". A variant name is "Sanooda Creek".
