= Noxapater Creek =

Stream in the U.S. state of Mississippi

Coordinates: 32.8840198°N 89.0525604°W

Noxapater Creek is a stream in the U.S. state of Mississippi.

The origin of the name Noxapater is unclear. The name supposedly is derived from the Choctaw language, and depending on source is purported to mean "little bullets" or "wide stream". Variant names are "Noxubee Creek" and "Noxupata Creek".
