= Otak Creek =

Stream in the U.S. state of Mississippi

Coordinates: 32.1107056°N 89.2753401°W

Otak Creek is a stream in the U.S. state of Mississippi.

Otak is a name derived from the Choctaw language purported to mean "beaver pond, lake". Variant names were "Otakoocha Creek", Otakooche Creek", and "Otokoochee Creek".
