= Tifallili Creek =

Stream in Mississippi, United States

Coordinates: 32.8342977°N 88.3850348°W

Tifallili is a stream in the U.S. states of Alabama and Mississippi.

Tifallili is a name derived from the Choctaw language meaning "tall dead tree".
