= Shackaloa Creek =

Stream in Mississippi, U.S.

Coordinates: 31.3215628°N 90.7276019°W

Shackaloa Creek is a stream in the U.S. state of Mississippi.

Shackaloa is a name derived from the Choctaw language meaning "cypress tree". A variant name is "Stockaloa Creek".
