= Copiah Creek =

Stream in Mississippi, U.S.

Coordinates: 31.8451604°N 90.1595302°W

Copiah Creek is a stream in the U.S. state of Mississippi. It is a tributary to the Pearl River.

Copiah is a name derived from the Choctaw language meaning "“screaming panther".
