= Bogue Ealiah =

Stream in Mississippi, U.S.

Coordinates: 31.8871002°N 89.1133900°W

Bogue Ealiah is a stream in the U.S. state of Mississippi. It is a tributary to Tallahala Creek.

Bogue Ealiah is a name derived from the Choctaw language meaning "long creek".
