= Bogue Fallah =

Stream in Mississippi, U.S.

Coordinates: 33.3109576°N 89.0858965°W

Bogue Fallah is a stream in the U.S. state of Mississippi.

Bogue Fallah is a name derived from the Choctaw language meaning "long creek".
