= Tokeba Bayou =

Stream in Mississippi, United States

Coordinates: 32.8592991°N 90.4570367°W

Tokeba Bayou is a stream in the U.S. state of Mississippi.

Tokeba is a name derived from the Choctaw language purported to mean "bitter", "first", or "stream bend".
