= Oktoc Creek =

Stream in Mississippi, U.S.

Coordinates: 33.2576243°N 88.7208837°W

Oktoc Creek is a stream in the U.S. state of Mississippi.

Oktoc is a name derived from the Choctaw language purported to mean "prairie".
