= Etehomo Creek =

Stream in Mississippi, U.S.

Coordinates: 31.7743266°N 89.3128392°W

Etehomo Creek is a stream in the U.S. state of Mississippi.

Etehomo Creek is a name most likely derived from the Choctaw language, but its original meaning is obscure. Variant names are "Eatahoma Creek", "Etahoma Creek", "Etchahoma Creek", "Etehoma Creek", and "Etihoma Creek".
