= Sabougla Creek =

Stream in Mississippi, United States

Coordinates: 33.6811727°N 89.3552735°W

Sabougla Creek is a stream in the U.S. state of Mississippi.

Sabougla is a name derived from the Choctaw language possibly meaning "smoke". Variant names are "Sabola", "Sabougala", "Sabougla Hatchie River", "Sabula Hatchie", and "Sobola".
