= Hiwannee, Mississippi =

Unincorporated community in Wayne County

Coordinates: 31°48′37″N 88°41′26″W

Hiwannee is an unincorporated community in Wayne County, in the U.S. state of Mississippi.

== History ==
A post office called Hiwannee was established in 1901, and remained in operation until 1973. Hiwannee is a name derived from the Choctaw language purported to mean "fruit-destroying insect". Variant transliterations are "Hewhannee" and "Hiyoowanne".
