= Ishitubba Creek =

Stream in Mississippi, U.S.

Coordinates: 34°44′22″N 89°00′58″W

Ishitubba Creek is a stream in the U.S. state of Mississippi. It is a tributary to North Tippah Creek.

Ishitubba is a name derived from the Choctaw language meaning "the one who takes and kills".
