= Conehoma Creek =

Stream in Mississippi, United States

Coordinates: 32.9881861°N 89.5961875°W

Conehoma Creek is a stream in the U.S. state of Mississippi.

Conehoma Creek is a name derived from the Choctaw language meaning "red polecat", a name which could have been applied to an indigenous warrior.
