= Tilda Bogue =

Stream in Mississippi, United States

Coordinates: 32.6476373°N 90.0636962°W

Tilda Bogue is a stream in the U.S. state of Mississippi.

Tilda Bogue is a name derived from the Choctaw language purported to mean "palmetto creek".
