= Shoccoe, Mississippi =

Community in Mississippi, United States

Coordinates: 32°36′35″N 89°54′04″W

Shoccoe is an unincorporated community in Madison County, in the U.S. state of Mississippi.

== History ==
A post office called Shoccoe was established in 1886, and remained in operation until 1909. A variant spelling is "Shocco". The name "Shoccoe" most likely is a transfer from a place in North Carolina.

Shoccoe had a population of 25 in 1900.
