= Big Scooba Creek =

Stream in Mississippi, United States

Coordinates: 32°45′54″N 88°22′50″W

Big Scooba Creek is a stream in the U.S. state of Mississippi.

Scooba is a name derived from the Choctaw language purported to mean "reed brake". A variant spelling is "Big Scoba Creek".
