= Sewayiah Creek =

Stream in Mississippi, U.S.

Coordinates: 33.6698408°N 88.9722811°W

Sewayiah Creek is a stream in the U.S. state of Mississippi.

Sewayiah is a name derived from the Choctaw language purported to mean "deer bending down, deer stooping down". Variant names are "Chewah Creek" and "Line Creek".
