= Minga Branch =

Stream in Mississippi, U.S.

Coordinates: 33.9234417°N 88.2730937°W

Minga Branch is a stream in the U.S. state of Mississippi.

Minga most is a name derived from the Chickasaw language meaning "chief".
