= Boughenia Creek =

Stream in Mississippi, U.S.

Coordinates: 33.3437351°N 89.0775629°W

Boughenia Creek is a stream in the U.S. state of Mississippi. It is a tributary to Sand Creek.

Boughenia Creek is a name derived from the Choctaw language meaning "creek at which there is dancing". A variant spelling is "Boughena Creek".
