= Mantachie Creek =

Stream in Mississippi, U.S.

Coordinates: 34.2145500°N 88.415323°W

Mantachie Creek is a stream in the U.S. state of Mississippi.

According to tradition, Mantachie is named after a Chickasaw chieftain. A variant name is "Mataches Creek".
