= Napanee, Mississippi =

- Unincorporated community
- Location within Mississippi Location within the United States
- Coordinates: 33°30′22″N 90°52′15″W
- Country: United States
- State: Mississippi
- County: Washington
- Elevation: 121 ft (37 m)
- Time zone: UTC-6 (Central (CST))
  - Summer (DST): UTC-5 (CDT)
- GNIS feature ID: 692096

Napanee is an unincorporated community in northern Washington County, in the U.S. state of Mississippi.

The community is located along Clear Creek just west of that stream's confluence with Bogue Phalia. A large fish farm lies just north of the location. Helm, on U.S. 61, lies two miles to the east.

== History ==
Napanee was a stop on a now-abandoned short-line railroad constructed by Delta Southern Railway in 1904. The Napanee Plantation was located in the area.

A post office called Napanee was established in 1905, and remained in operation until 1912. The name "Napanee" is possibly of Choctaw language origin; it's purported to mean "something to twist or braid".
