= Lake Sequoyah (Mississippi) =

- Location within Mississippi Location within the United States
- Location: Lee County, Mississippi
- Coordinates: 34°20′08″N 88°38′03″W
- Type: reservoir
- Etymology: Sequoyah
- Basin countries: United States
- Surface elevation: 397 ft (121 m)

Lake Sequoyah is a reservoir in the U.S. state of Mississippi.

Lake Sequoyah was named after Sequoyah (1767–1843), an Indian silversmith and inventor of the Cherokee syllabary.
