= Balucta Creek =

Stream in Mississippi, U.S.

Coordinates: 32°39′56″N 89°35′46″W

Balucta Creek is a stream in the U.S. state of Mississippi. It is a tributary to the Pearl River.

Balucta is a name derived from the Choctaw language meaning "round". A variant spelling is "Bibalucta Creek".
