= Scoobachita Creek =

Stream in Mississippi, United States

Coordinates: 33.2384603°N 89.6575795°W

Scoobachita Creek is a stream in the U.S. state of Mississippi.

Scoobachita is a name derived from the Choctaw language purported to mean "big reed brake".
