= Hobuck Creek =

Stream in Mississippi, United States

Coordinates: 32.7384680°N 89.9453609°W

Hobuck Creek is a stream in the U.S. state of Mississippi. It is a tributary to Doaks Creek.

Hobuck is a name derived from the Choctaw language meaning "eunuch or gelding". A variant name is "Hobuck Bogue".
