= Puskus Creek =

Stream in Mississippi, United States

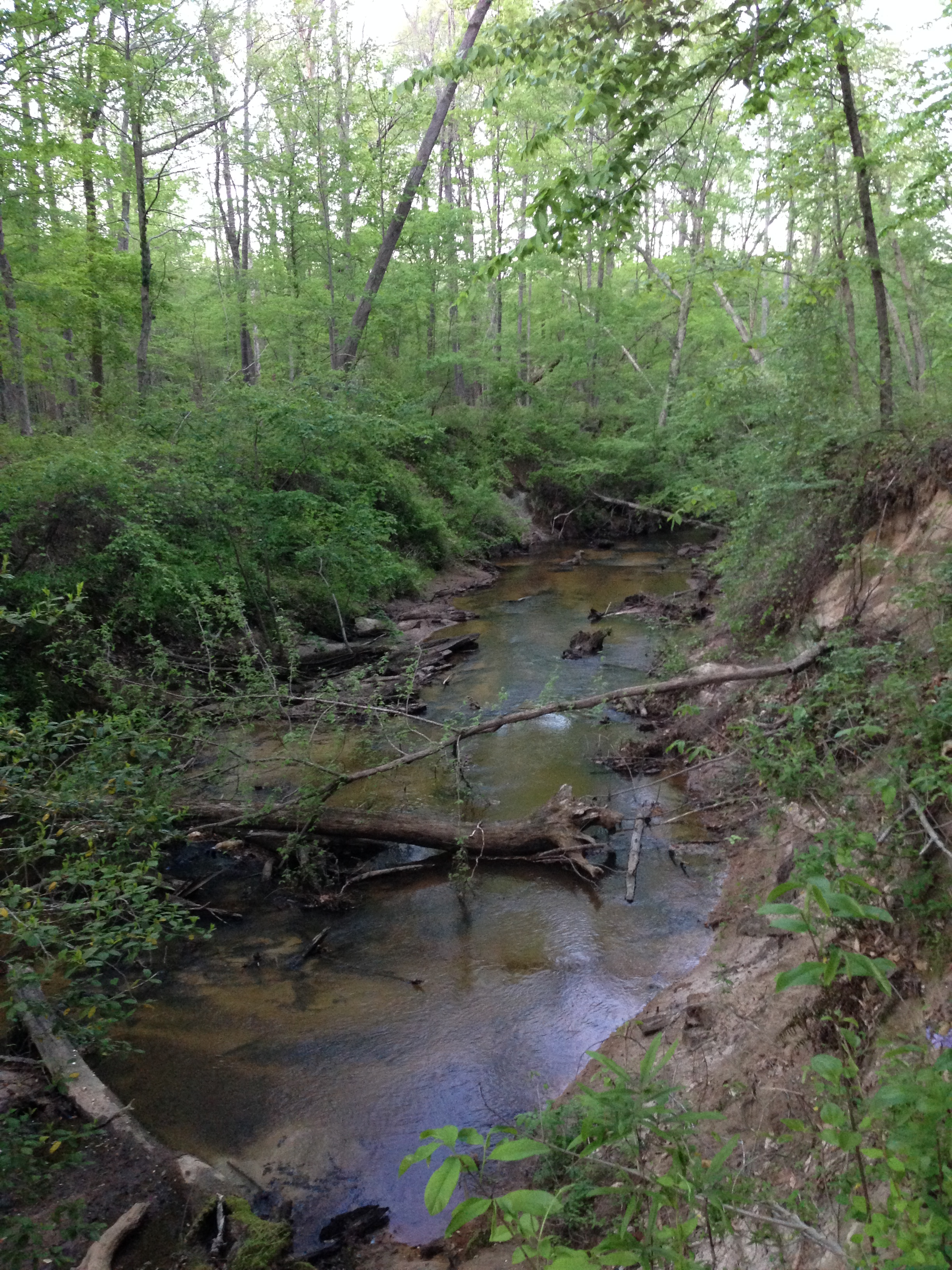
- Puskus Creek in Holly Springs National Forest

Location
- Country: United States
- State: Mississippi

Physical characteristics
- Source
  - coordinates: 34.3673278°N 89.367021°W
- Mouth
  - coordinates: 34.4545478°N 89.2834073°W

Puskus Creek is a stream in the U.S. state of Mississippi. Puskus is a name derived from the Choctaw language meaning "baby". Variant names are "Puscoos Creek", "Puscus Creek", "Puscuss Creek", and "Puss Cuss Creek".
