= Shockaloo Creek =

Stream in the U.S. state of Mississippi

Coordinates: 32.4998628°N 89.5372921°W

Shockaloo Creek is a stream in the U.S. state of Mississippi.

Shockaloo is a name derived from the Choctaw language meaning "cypress tree". Variant names are "Schock Creek" and "Shockaloe Creek".
