= Bogue Hasty =

Stream in Mississippi, U.S.

Coordinates: 33.5570592°N 90.8584327°W

Bogue Hasty is a stream in the U.S. state of Mississippi.

Bogue Hasty is a name derived from the Choctaw language, and it most likely means "dead-leaves creek".
