= Bibalucta Creek =

Stream in Mississippi, U.S.

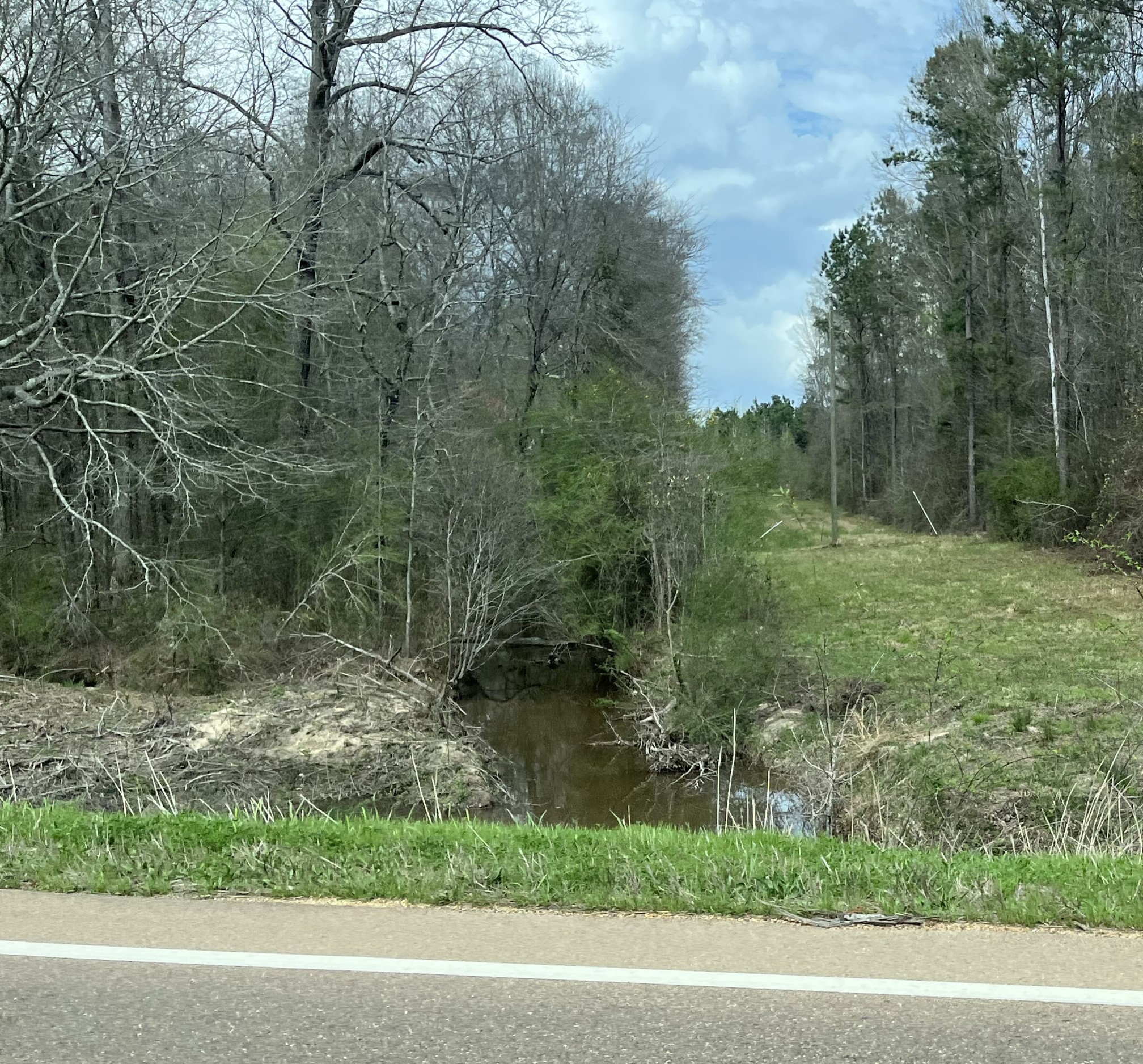
- Bibalucta Creek in Winston County, Mississippi

Location
- Country: United States
- State: Mississippi

Physical characteristics
- Source
  - coordinates: 32.9612409°N 89.2647906°W
- Mouth
  - coordinates: 32.8979100°N 89.4300707°W
- Length: 10.6 mi (17.1 km)
- Basin size: 30.8 mi^{2} (80 km^{2})

Bibalucta Creek is a stream in the U.S. state of Mississippi.

Bibalucta Creek is a name derived from the Choctaw language, though sources vary as to its meaning. The GNIS translates it as "long pond in the woods", while Native American languages scholar Keith Baca believes the name is a reference to mulberries. A variant name is "Bayou Ballucta Creek".
