= Pelucia Creek =

Stream in Mississippi, U.S.

Coordinates: 33.4628989°N 90.2214726°W

Pelucia Creek is a stream in the U.S. state of Mississippi, located about 4 mi (6.4km) southwest of the city of Greenwood. It is mainly located in Leflore County as well as Caroll County, and is a tributary to the Yazoo River.

Pelucia is a name derived from the Choctaw language purported to mean "flying squirrels are there".

== History ==
The gage height of Pelucia Creek was monitored from September of 1986 to September of 1988 by the US Geological Survey (USGS). Through the USGS, the National Water Quality Monitoring Council reported values of pesticides, physical traits, and levels of inorganics at the stream's location near local community Rising Sun. Here, they reported a pH value of 6.1 std units.

Pelucia Creek, as well as the Tillatoba, Abiaca, and Topashaw Creeks, was the subject of a 1982 report regarding morphologic changes over recent history. The report, published by Colorado State University, indicated that Pelucia Creek flows into the flat Yazoo Basin. Between 1940 and 1945, it was subject to heavy flooding which led to increased sediment deposition, a trait also boosted by nearby gravel mining.

In 2021, the Association of State Dam Safety Officials reported that Pelucia Creek could, in the future, breach the lake. The specific lake in question was not specified.
