= Pushacoona Creek =

Stream in Mississippi, U.S.

Coordinates: 32.7942985°N 88.3894791°W

Pushacoona Creek is a stream in the U.S. state of Mississippi.

Pushacoona is a name derived from the Choctaw language purported to mean "river, watercourse, stream".
