= Yonaba Creek =

Stream in Mississippi, United States

Coordinates: 34.3098276°N 88.7222758°W

- Etymology: Choctaw for "ironwood"

Location
- Country: United States
- State: Mississippi

Yonaba Creek is a stream in the U.S. state of Mississippi.

Yonaba is a name derived from the Choctaw language purported to mean "ironwood".
