= Penantly Creek =

Stream in Mississippi, U.S.

Coordinates: 32.1859806°N 88.9731095°W

Penantly Creek is a stream in the U.S. state of Mississippi.

Penantly is a name derived from the Choctaw language purported to mean either (sources vary) "boat landing place" or "ferry".
