= Magowah Creek =

Stream in Mississippi, U.S.

Coordinates: 33.3640098°N 88.3967056°W

Magowah Creek is a stream in the U.S. state of Mississippi.

Magowah most likely is a corruption of the surname "McGower", after a local settler. Variant names are "McCowens Creek", "McCowers Creek", and "McGowers Creek".
