= Kentuctah Creek =

Stream in the U.S. state of Mississippi

Coordinates: 32°42′36″N 89°52′21″W

Kentuctah Creek is a stream in the U.S. state of Mississippi. It is a tributary to Doaks Creek.

Kentuctah is a name derived from the Choctaw language purported to mean "beaver pond". A variant transliteration is "Kenwetah Creek".
