= Santee Branch =

Stream in Mississippi, United States

Coordinates: 31.5615569°N 89.6525720°W

Santee Branch is a stream in the U.S. state of Mississippi.

Santee is a name either derived from the Choctaw language meaning "snake", or a transfer from the Santee River, in South Carolina.
