= Big Oktibee Creek =

Stream in Mississippi, U.S.

Coordinates: 31°03′23″N 88°46′30″W

Big Oktibee Creek is a stream in the U.S. state of Mississippi.

Oktibee is a name derived from the Choctaw language meaning either "bloody water" or "icy creek". Variant names are "Big Oaktibbee Creek", "Oakitbee Creek", "Oaktibbee Creek", "Oaktibee Creek", "Oktibbeh Creek", and "Oktibee Creek".
