= Tchula Lake =

Stream in Mississippi, United States

Coordinates: 33.0973489°N 90.4320339°W

Tchula Lake is a creek in the U.S. state of Mississippi. Despite its name, Tchula Lake is classified by the GNIS as a stream rather than a lake. It is a tributary to the Yazoo River.

Tchula is a name derived from the Choctaw language purported to mean "fox". Variant names are "Little River" and "Tchula River".
