= Archusa Creek =

Stream in Mississippi, U.S.

Coordinates: 32°01′01″N 88°43′17″W

Archusa Creek is a stream in the U.S. state of Mississippi. It is a tributary to the Chickasawhay River.

Archusa most likely is a name derived from the Choctaw language meaning "little creek".
