= Little Bogue =

Stream in Mississippi, U.S.

Coordinates: 33.6862293°N 89.7250838°W

Little Bogue is a stream in the U.S. state of Mississippi.

Little Bogue is a name partially derived from the Choctaw language meaning "little creek". Variant names are "East Fork Batupah Bogue", "East Fork Bogue Creek", and "Little Bogue Creek".
