= Toby Tubby Creek =

Stream in Mississippi, United States

Coordinates: 34.4734381°N 89.6667520°W

Toby Tubby Creek is a stream in the U.S. state of Mississippi.

The creek is named after Toby Tubby, a Chickasaw chieftain. A variant name is "Tobi Tubby Creek".
