= Kentawka Canal =

Stream in Mississippi, U.S.

Coordinates: 32°47′21″N 89°10′46″W

Kentawka Canal is a stream in the U.S. state of Mississippi.

Variant names are "Kentawah Canal", "Kentawaha Creek" and "Kentawha Creek". Kentawka is a name derived from the Choctaw language purported to mean "place where beavers are brought forth in abundance".
