= Chittobochiah Creek =

Stream in Mississippi, U.S.

Coordinates: 33.4534543°N 88.6444922°W

Chittobochiah Creek is a stream in the U.S. state of Mississippi. It is a tributary to Catalpa Creek.

A variant transliteration is "Ittobechi Creek". The name Ittobechi is derived from the Choctaw language, and it's purported to mean "one that causes fighting".
