= Pellaphalia Creek (Leake County, Mississippi) =

Creek in Mississippi

Coordinates: 32°41′51″N 89°34′10″W

Pellaphalia Creek is a stream in the U.S. state of Mississippi. It is a tributary to the Pearl River.

== Etymology ==
Pellaphalia is speculated to derive from the Choctaw words apeli meaning hurricane or strong winds and chalih meaning "chop down trees" in the Choctaw language. The name is purported to mean "(long) place where a hurricane or whirlwind passed along and blew down the timber".
