= Funny Yockana Creek =

Stream in Mississippi, U.S.

Coordinates: 32.7559675°N 89.1350611°W

Funny Yockana Creek is a stream in the U.S. state of Mississippi.

Funny Yockana is a name derived from the Choctaw language meaning "squirrel country".
