= Scutchalo Creek =

Stream in Mississippi, United States

Location
- Country: United States
- State: Mississippi
- County: Copiah

Physical characteristics
- Source
  - coordinates: 32.0312668°N 90.7137117°W

Scutchalo Creek is a stream in the U.S. state of Mississippi.

The name "Scutchalo" may be derived from an unidentified Native American language, but its meaning is obscure.
