= Okachickima Creek =

Stream in Mississippi, U.S.

Coordinates: 33.9178914°N 89.6981411°W

Okachickima Creek is a stream in the U.S. state of Mississippi.

Okachickima is a name derived from the Choctaw language meaning "good water".
