= Bose Nukse Creek =

Stream in Mississippi, U.S.

Coordinates: 32.7718012°N 89.3684009°W

Bose Nukse Creek is a stream in the U.S. state of Mississippi. It is a tributary to the Pearl River.

Bose Nukse Creek is a name derived from the Choctaw language, but the meaning of its native name has been lost.
