= Okwakee Creek =

Stream in Alabama and Mississippi, U.S.

Coordinates: 31.1243836°N 88.3762362°W

Okwakee Creek is a stream in the U.S. states of Alabama and Mississippi.

Okwakee is a name derived from the Choctaw language purported to mean "ridge". Variant names are "Aulkwaukee Creek" and "Oakwalkey Creek".
