= Loakfoma Creek =

Stream in Mississippi, U.S.

Coordinates: 33.2634577°N 88.7472736°W

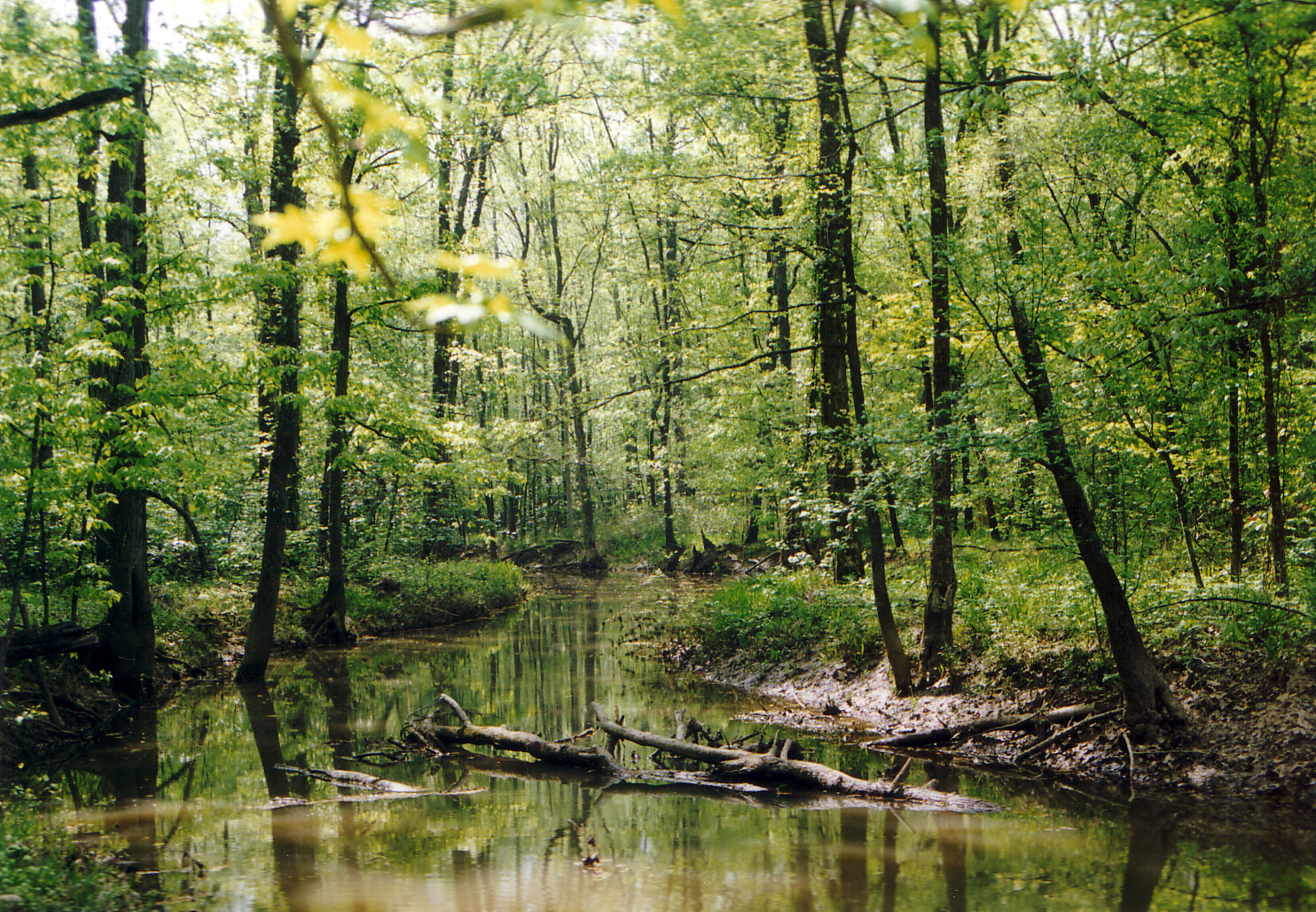
Loakfoma Creek

Loakfoma Creek is a stream in the U.S. state of Mississippi.

Lakeformer is a name derived from the Choctaw language meaning "red clay". A variant name is "Lakeformer Creek".
