= Shaui Koli Creek =

Stream in Mississippi, United States

Coordinates: 32.7815228°N 89.6453536°W

Shaui Koli Creek is a stream in the U.S. state of Mississippi.

Shaui Koli is a name derived from the Choctaw language meaning "raccoon spring".
