= Kickapoo Lake (Mississippi) =

- Location within Mississippi Location within the United States
- Location: Hinds County, Mississippi
- Coordinates: 32°24′09″N 90°20′41″W
- Type: reservoir
- Etymology: Kickapoo people

Kickapoo Lake is a private lake in Hinds County, Mississippi, USA. Located 8 miles (13 km) north of Clinton, Mississippi and 12 miles (19 km) northwest of Jackson, Mississippi, Kickapoo Lake is an artificial lake on private land. Until the mid 1980s, Kickapoo Lake was the water feature for the former Boy Scouts of America summer camp Camp Kickapoo, the camp for BSA members in the Andrew Jackson Council of Mississippi. The camp was closed with the opening of the Warren A. Hood Scout Reservation in Copiah County, Mississippi. The camp and lake are now privately owned.

Kickapoo Lake was named after the Kickapoo people.
