= Lucknuck Creek =

Stream in Mississippi, U.S.

Coordinates: 34.0303873°N 89.2625725°W

Lucknuck Creek is a stream in the U.S. state of Mississippi.

Lucknuck is a name derived from the Choctaw language purported to mean "yellow". A variant name is "Lucknow Creek".
