= Little Scooba Creek =

Stream in Mississippi, United States

Coordinates: 32.7965207°N 88.4322586°W

Little Scooba Creek is a stream in the U.S. state of Mississippi. It sits on an elevation of 161 feet (49 m).

Scooba is a name derived from the Choctaw language purported to mean "reed brake".
