= Bogue Faliah =

Stream in Mississippi, U.S.

Coordinates: 32.5137510°N 89.3639541°W

Bogue Faliah is a stream in the U.S. state of Mississippi.

Bogue Faliah is a name derived from the Choctaw language meaning "long creek". Variant names are "Boga Falia", "Bogue Falia", "Bogue Faliah Creek", "Bogue Filia", "Bogue Filiah", and "Bogue Litto".
