= Senatobia Creek =

Creek in Mississippi

Coordinates: 34.6362138°N 89.9498119°W

Senatobia Creek is a stream in the U.S. state of Mississippi.

Senatobia is a name derived from the Choctaw language purported to mean "white sycamore".
