= Hushpuckena Creek =

Stream in Mississippi, United States

Coordinates: 34.1734398°N 90.8026046°W

Hushpuckena Creek is a stream in the U.S. state of Mississippi.

Hushpuckena is a name derived from the Choctaw language purported to mean "sunflowers are abundant". A variant name is "Hushpuckana Bayou".
