= Beasha Creek =

Stream in the U.S. state of Mississippi

Coordinates: 32°48′07″N 89°18′27″W

Beasha Creek is a stream in the U.S. state of Mississippi. It is a tributary to the Pearl River.

Beasha Creek is a name derived from the Choctaw language meaning roughly "mulberries are there". Old variant names are "Beashers Creek" and "Beheaiaha Creek".
