= Jofuska Creek =

Stream in Mississippi, United States

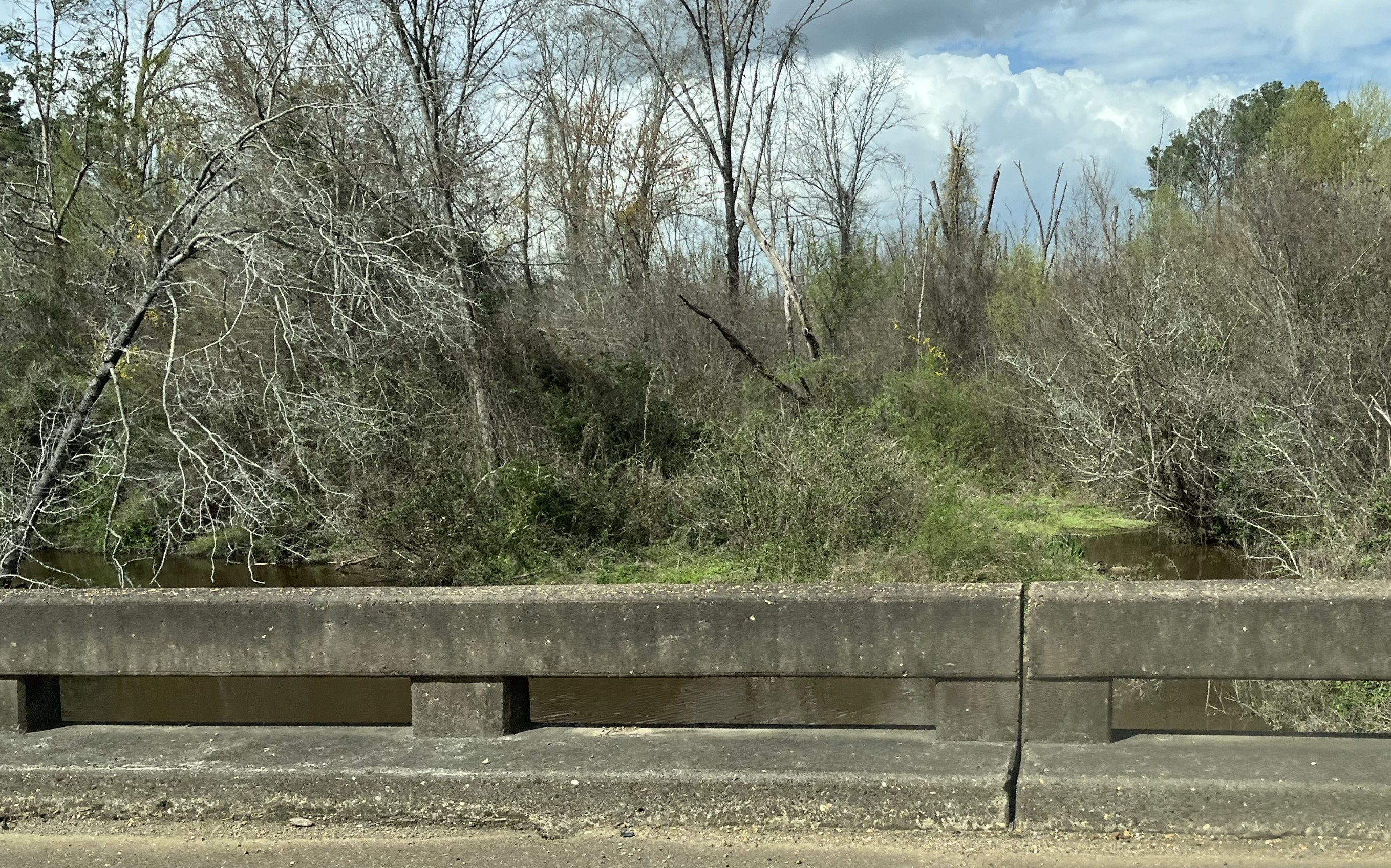
- Jofuska Creek in Neshoba County, Mississippi

Location
- Country: United States
- State: Mississippi

Physical characteristics
- Source
  - coordinates: 32.9690185°N 89.2559017°W
- Mouth
  - coordinates: 32.8279105°N 89.2042311°W
- Length: 9.3 mi (15.0 km)
- Basin size: 18.9 mi^{2} (49 km^{2})

Jofuska Creek is a stream in the U.S. state of Mississippi. It is a tributary to the Pearl River.

Jofuska is a name derived from the Choctaw language of uncertain meaning. Variant names are "Hurricane Creek", "Jofusha Creek" and "Smallwood Branch".
