= Pottock Creek =

Stream in Leake County, United States of America

Coordinates: 32.7093030°N 89.5084036°W

Pottock Creek is a stream in the U.S. state of Mississippi.

Pottock is a name derived from the Choctaw language purported to signify "stream with two branches".
