= Chickasaw Hill =

Summit in Mississippi, United States

Coordinates: 34.1684437°N 89.8217555°W

Chickasaw Hill is a summit in the U.S. state of Mississippi. The elevation is 328 feet (100 m).

Chickasaw Hill derives its name from the Chickasaw tribe.
