= Cushtusia Creek =

Stream in the U.S. state of Mississippi

Coordinates: 32.6956910°N 89.0586692°W

Cushtusia Creek is a stream in the U.S. state of Mississippi.

Cushtusia Creek is a name derived from the Choctaw language meaning "fleas are there". A variant name is "Custusha Creek".
