= Bollybusha Creek =

Stream in the U.S. state of Mississippi

Coordinates: 32.4859737°N 89.3370087°W

Bollybusha Creek is a stream in the U.S. state of Mississippi.

Bollybusha Creek is a name derived from the Choctaw language meaning "slippery elms are there".
