= Tallahattah Creek =

Stream in Mississippi, United States

Coordinates: 31.8529347°N 89.0983894°W

Tallahattah Creek is a stream in the U.S. state of Mississippi.

Tallahattah is a name derived from the Choctaw language meaning "white rock". Variant names are "Tali Hata Creek" and "Tallahatta Creek".
