= Seneasha Creek =

Stream in Mississippi, U.S.

Coordinates: 32.9301313°N 89.8986943°W

Seneasha Creek is a stream in the U.S. state of Mississippi.

Seneasha is a name derived from the Choctaw language purported to mean either "sycamores are there" or "sycamore river". Variant names are "Seneatcha", "Senesha Creek", and "Sineasha".
