= Minnehaha River =

Amazon River

Coordinates: 31.1382329°N 90.4589858°W

Minnehaha River is a stream in the U.S. state of Mississippi.

The name Minnehaha is a transfer from Minnehaha Falls, in Minnesota.
