= Bala Chitto Creek =

Stream in Louisiana and Mississippi, U.S.

Coordinates: 30°59′54″N 90°27′16″W

Bala Chitto Creek is a stream in the U.S. states of Louisiana and Mississippi. It is a tributary to the Tangipahoa River.

Bala Chitto is a name derived from the Choctaw language.
