= Tonacana Creek =

Stream in Mississippi, United States

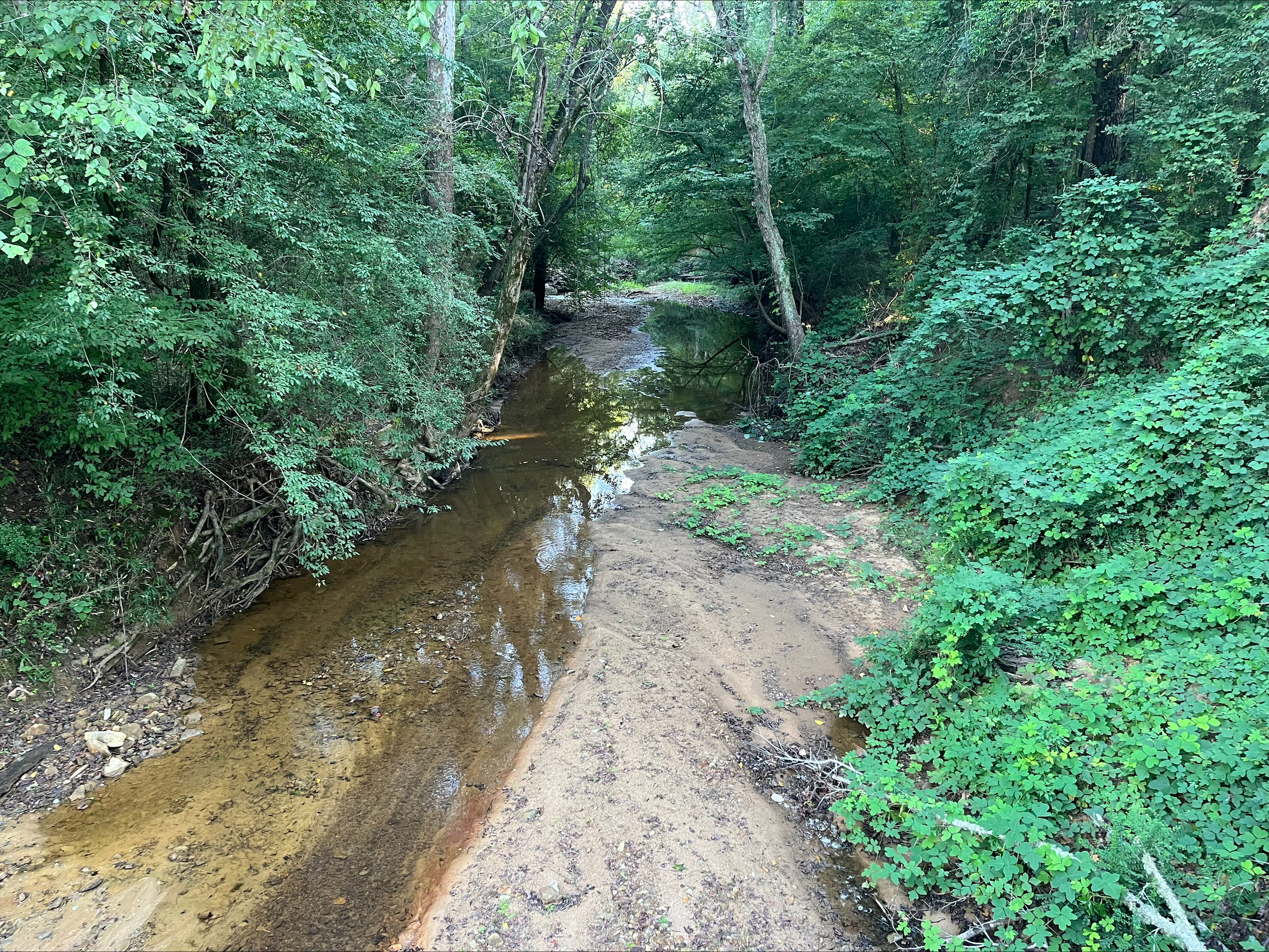
- Tonacana Creek

Location
- Country: United States
- State: Mississippi

Physical characteristics
- Source
  - coordinates: 32.4029201°N 88.9494976°W
- Mouth
  - coordinates: 32.3223663°N 88.9397751°W
- Length: 5.2 mi (8.4 km)

Tonacana Creek is a stream in the U.S. state of Mississippi.

Tonacana is a name derived from the Choctaw language meaning "standing posts".
