= Calabrella Creek =

Stream in the U.S. state of Mississippi

Coordinates: 33.4626233°N 89.3897933°W

Calabrella Creek is a stream in the U.S. state of Mississippi. It is a tributary to the Big Black River.

Calabrella is a name derived from the Choctaw language with an uncertain etymology. A variant spelling is "Cullabrella Creek".
