= Pontotoc Ridge =

Ridge in Mississippi, USA

Coordinates: 34.1453862°N 88.8217218°W

Pontotoc Ridge is a ridge in the U.S. state of Mississippi.

Pontotoc Ridge may also refer to The Nature Conservancy's Pontotoc Ridge Nature Preserve.

Pontotoc is a name derived from the Choctaw language purported to mean "hanging grapes".
