= Shutispear Creek =

Stream in Mississippi, U.S.

Coordinates: 33.8101156°N 89.4120195°W

Shutispear Creek is a stream in the U.S. state of Mississippi.

Shutispear is a name derived from the Choctaw language purported to mean "pot scoop; ladle".
