= Okeelala Creek =

Stream in Mississippi, U.S.

Coordinates: 34.4653784°N 88.6031080°W

Okeelala Creek is a stream in the U.S. state of Mississippi.

Okeelala is a name derived from the Choctaw language purported to mean "splashing water". A variant transliteration is "Okolalah Creek".
