= Bogue Cheely =

Stream in Mississippi, U.S.

Coordinates: 31.7076616°N 89.0294987°W

Bogue Cheely is a stream in the U.S. state of Mississippi.

Bogue Cheely is a name derived from the Choctaw language most likely meaning "branch or branches of a creek".
