= Yanubbee Creek =

Stream in Oklahoma, United States

Yanubbee Creek is a stream in McCurtain County of the U.S. state of Oklahoma.

The stream headwaters are the confluence of the East and West Forks at 34°04′32″N 94°44′09″W adjacent to US Route 259 north of Broken Bow and it flows to the south-southeast past Broken Bow and under US Route 70. The stream confluence with Crooked Creek is at 33°58′45″N 94°41′59″W.

Yanubbee is a name derived from the Choctaw language meaning "ironwood". A variant spelling is "Yanubbe Creek".
