= Tippo Bayou =

Stream in Mississippi, United States

Coordinates: 33.7087278°N 90.1892525°W

Tippo Bayou is a stream in the U.S. state of Mississippi.

Opinions are divided whether this creek is named after the Ibitoupa Indian tribe, or a name derived from the Choctaw language meaning "severed, parted, separated".
