= Bogue Statinea =

Stream in Mississippi, United States

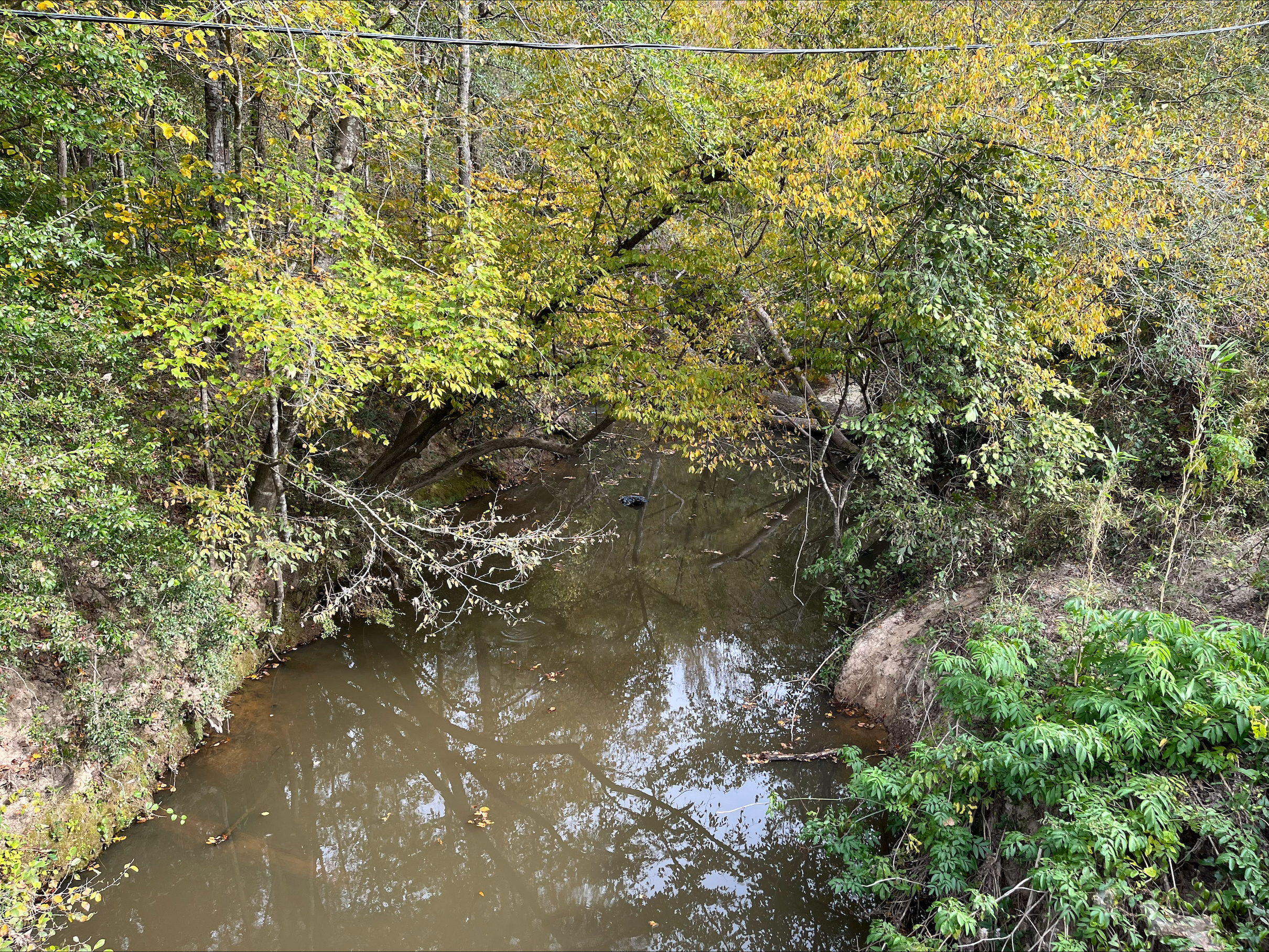
- Bogue Statinea

Location
- Country: United States
- State: Mississippi

Physical characteristics
- Source
  - coordinates: 32.4165311°N 88.8511611°W
- Mouth
  - coordinates: 32.3584766°N 88.8900513°W
- Length: 5.48 mi (8.82 km)

Bogue Statinea is a stream in the U.S. state of Mississippi.

Bogue Statinea is a name derived from the Choctaw language; its name is purported to mean "little creek". A variant name is "Bogue Statinea Creek".
