= Teoc Creek (Sucarnoochee River tributary) =

Stream in Mississippi, United States

Coordinates: 32.6518016°N 88.3819779°W

Teoc Creek is a stream in the U.S. states of Alabama and Mississippi. It is a tributary to the Sucarnoochee River.

Teoc is a name derived from the Choctaw language meaning "pine". Variant names are "Teah Creek", "Teark Creek", "Teock Creek", "Teoe Creek", and "Tioch Creek".
