= Mingo Creek (Mississippi) =

Stream in Mississippi, U.S.

Coordinates: 31.8709884°N 88.7197642°W

Mingo Creek is a stream in the U.S. state of Mississippi.

Mingo is a name derived from the Choctaw language meaning "chief".
