= Tallabogue Creek (Chickasawhay River tributary) =

Stream in Mississippi, United States

Coordinates: 31.9637622°N 88.5255889°W

Tallabogue Creek is a stream in the U.S. state of Mississippi. It is a tributary to the Chickasawhay River.

Tallabogue is a name derived from the Choctaw language purported to mean "palmetto creek". Variant names are "Taala Bogue Creek", "Talla Bogue Creek", "Talla Creek", "Tallobogue Creek", and "Tallow Bogue Creek".
