= Tumbaloo Creek =

Stream in Mississippi, United States

Coordinates: 32.2026488°N 90.0353615°W

Tumbaloo Creek is a stream in the U.S. state of Mississippi.

Tumbaloo is a name derived from the Choctaw language meaning "beech tree". A variant name is "Tumpaloo Creek".
