= Ocobla Creek =

Stream in the U.S. state of Mississippi

Coordinates: 32.8490207°N 89.0786718°W

Ocobla Creek is a stream in the U.S. state of Mississippi.

Ocobla is a name derived from the Choctaw language purported to mean either (sources vary) "water where the biting is" or "bulls-eye bush". A variant transliteration is "Ocobly Creek".
