= Shongelo Creek =

Stream in the U.S. state of Mississippi

Coordinates: 32.0284874°N 89.4370109°W

Shongelo Creek is a stream in the U.S. state of Mississippi.

Shongelo is a name derived from the Choctaw language meaning "cypress tree".
