= Teoc Creek (Yalobusha River tributary) =

Stream in Mississippi, United States

Coordinates: 33.6056744°N 90.1098069°W

Teoc Creek is a stream in the U.S. state of Mississippi.

Teoc is a name derived from the Choctaw language meaning "pine". Variant names are "Long Pine Creek" and "North Teoctalia Creek".
