= Topisaw Creek =

Stream in Mississippi, United States

Coordinates: 31.1990657°N 90.2889820°W

Topisaw Creek is a stream in the U.S. state of Mississippi. It is a tributary to Bogue Chitto.

Topisaw is a name derived from the Choctaw language purported to mean "little chestnut". Variant names are "East Topisaw Creek", "Otapasso Creek", "Otuspasso Brook", "Topisaw River", and "Topsaw River".
