= Fannegusha Creek (Blissdale Swamp tributary) =

Stream in east-central Mississippi, U.S.

Fannegusha Creek is a stream in Carroll and Holmes counties in east-central Mississippi. It is a tributary to the Blissdale Swamp.

The stream headwaters arise in Carroll County at 33°18′22″N 89°52′52″W at an elevation of approximately 380 feet. The stream flows to the southwest into Holmes County passing under Mississippi Highway 17 and Mississippi Highway 12 north and northeast of Lexington. It is channelized as it enters the Blissdale Swamp within the Hillside National Wildlife Sanctuary 3.5 miles southeast of Tchula and one mile northwest of the community of Howard. The stream ends at 33°06′06″N 90°13′19″W at an elevation of 125 feet.

Fannegusha is a name derived from the Choctaw language purported to mean "tasty squirrel". Variant names for Fannegusha Creek are "Foney Bush Creek", "Funnegusha Creek", and "Funnigusha Creek".
