= Tallabogue (Leaf River tributary) =

Stream in Mississippi, U.S.

Coordinates: 32.1954269°N 89.4525674°W

Tallabogue is a stream in the U.S. state of Mississippi. It is a tributary to the Leaf River.

Tallabogue is a name derived from the Choctaw language purported to mean "palmetto creek". A variant name is "Tallabogue Creek".
