= Poticaw Bayou =

Stream in Mississippi, U.S.

Coordinates: 30.5118645°N 88.6180761°W

Poticaw Bayou is a stream in the U.S. state of Mississippi. It is a tributary to the West Pascagoula River.

Poticaw is a name derived from the Choctaw language purported to mean "double". Variant names are "Bayou Portico", "Portico Bayo", "Portigo Bayou".
