= Coffee Bogue =

Stream in Mississippi, U.S.

Coordinates: 32.6076375°N 89.7600775°W

Coffee Bogue is a stream in the U.S. state of Mississippi. It is a tributary to the Pearl River.

Coffee Bogue is a name derived from the Choctaw language meaning either "quail creek" or "sassafras creek"; the element "Coffee" in this context is an Anglicization of the Indian name and does not refer to the hot beverage. Variant names are "Beach Creek", "Buck Branch", and "Coffee Bogue Creek".
