= Tallabogue (Tuscolameta Creek tributary) =

Stream in the U.S. state of Mississippi

Coordinates: 32.4998627°N 89.4603456°W

Tallabogue is a stream in the U.S. state of Mississippi. It is a tributary to Tuscolameta Creek.

Tallabogue is a name derived from the Choctaw language purported to mean "palmetto creek". Variant names are "Taalah Creek" and "Tallabogue Creek".
