= Teock Creek =

Stream in Mississippi, United States

Coordinates: 32.1248733°N 89.4261776°W

Teock Creek is a stream in the U.S. state of Mississippi.

Teock is a name derived from the Choctaw language meaning "pine".
