= Oakohay Creek =

Stream in Mississippi, U.S.

Coordinates: 31.7312730°N 89.4170088°W

Oakohay Creek is a stream in the U.S. state of Mississippi.

Oakohay is a name derived from the Choctaw language purported to mean "mud potato". Variant names are "Coahay Creek", "Cohay Creek", "Oakahay Creek", "Ochahay Creek", and "Ocohay Creek".
