= Mingo Branch =

Stream in Tishomingo County, Mississippi, U.S.

Coordinates: 34°38′04″N 88°08′07″W

Mingo Branch is a stream in Tishomingo County in the U.S. state of Mississippi. It is a tributary of Cedar Creek.

Mingo is a name derived from the Choctaw language meaning "chief".
