= Chickasaw language =

Muskogean language from the US

Chickasaw
- Chikashshanompaꞌ
- Native to: United States
- Region: South central Oklahoma, from Byng or Happyland (near Ada) north, and from Davis or Ardmore west to Fillmore and Wapanucka in east.
- Ethnicity: 35,000 (1999)
- Native speakers: 75 (2017)
- Language family: Muskogean: Western Muskogean; Chickasaw

Language codes
- ISO 639-3: cic
- Glottolog: chic1270
- ELP: Chickasaw
- Historical Chickasaw territory and current Chickasaw territory (Chickasaw Nation), where the language was and is currently spoken

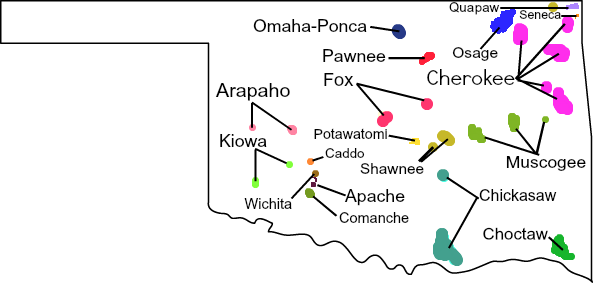
- Distribution of Native American languages in Oklahoma

- People: Chikashsha
- Language: Chikashshanompaꞌ
- Country: Chikashsha Yaki

The Chickasaw language (Chikashshanompaꞌ, Chickasaw pronunciation: [tʃikaʃːanompaʔ]) is a Native American language of the Muskogean family. It is agglutinative and follows the word order pattern of subject–object–verb (SOV). The language is closely related to, though perhaps not entirely mutually intelligible with, Choctaw. It is spoken by the Chickasaw tribe, now residing in Southeast Oklahoma, centered on Ada.

The language is currently spoken by around 50 people, mostly Chickasaw elders who grew up with the language. Due to boarding schools in the 20th century and Chickasaw removal from their homeland in the 19th century, the widespread knowledge about the language and culture amongst the nation has largely decreased.

== Classification ==
Chickasaw, Choctaw and Houma form the Western branch of the Muskogean language family. The Chickasaw and Choctaw were once a unified tribe who similarly spoke the Muskogean languages. The Chickasaw language was widely spoken until 1970 but has since become an endangered language. Chickasaw is also related to Alabama, Koasati, Mvskoke (Creek)-Seminole, Hitchiti and Mikasuki.

== History ==
Sometime prior to the first European contact, the Chickasaw migrated from western regions and moved east of the Mississippi River, where they settled mostly in present-day northeast Mississippi. Chickasaw towns and villages were structured to be densely populated as a wartime measure but encompassed larger areas when there was no conflict with enemies. A main house and main meeting ground were used to gather groups from the Chickasaw community for ceremonies, celebratory affairs, and to discuss important social, cultural, and political matters. There was a division and specialization in labor done by men who prepared the community for war, hunted for food, and made provisions for the defense of their communities while Chickasaw women were matriarchal leaders of their households who cared for crops, children, and estate matters. They would eventually come into contact with Europeans as time passed on and European exploration of their lands took shape. That is where they encountered European explorers and traders, having relationships with French, English and Spanish during the colonial years. The United States considered the Chickasaw one of the Five Civilized Tribes, as they adopted numerous practices of European Americans. Resisting European-American settlers encroaching on their territory, they were forced by the US to sell their country in 1832 and move to Indian Territory (Oklahoma) during the era of Indian Removal in the 1830s.

== Current status ==
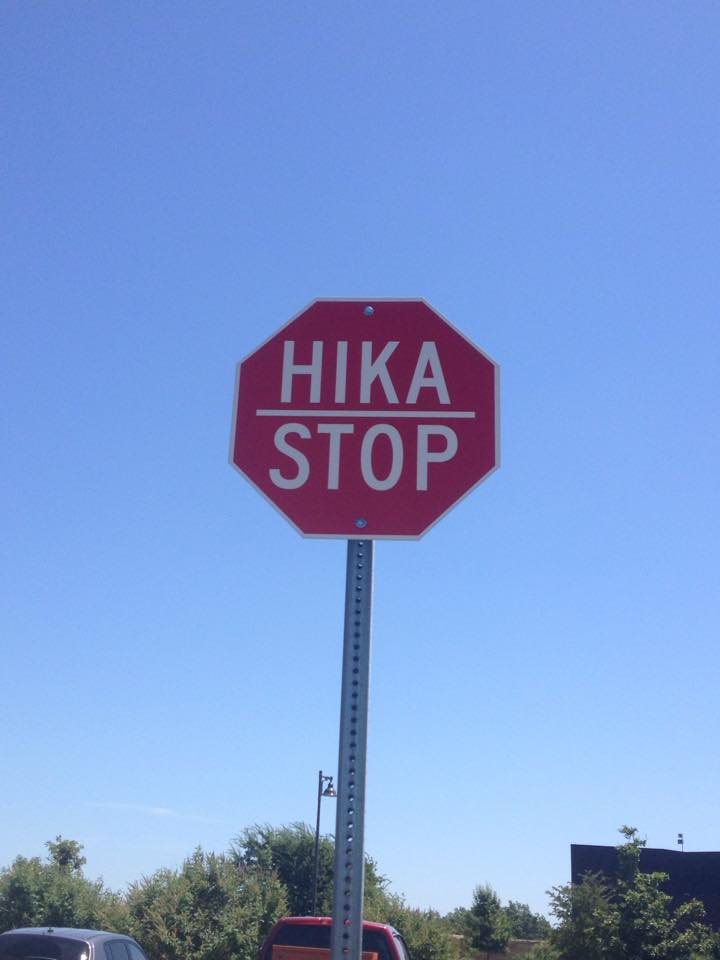
Chickasaw language stop sign, with Chickasaw word Hika ("stop"), in Ada, Oklahoma

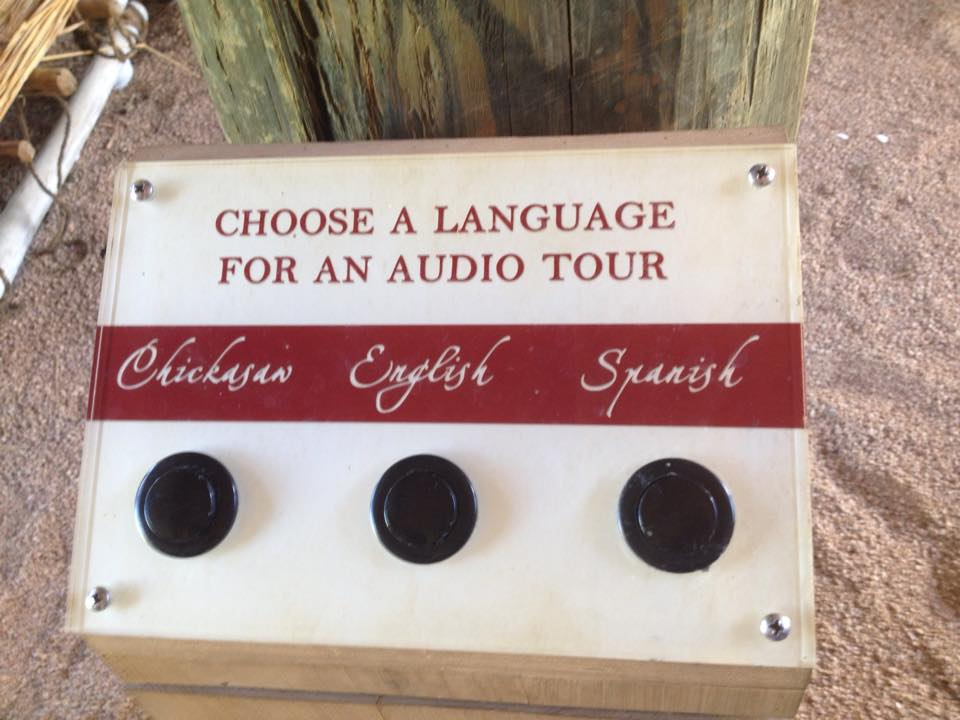
Language offerings for audio tours at the Chickasaw Cultural Center, including Chickasaw, English, and Spanish

Emily Johnson Dickerson, the last monolingual speaker of Chickasaw, died on December 30, 2013. Ethnologue estimated in its seventeenth edition that Chickasaw retained up to 600 speakers, but noted that this figure was rapidly declining because most speakers are 50 and older. Children are no longer acquiring the language, indicating Chickasaw has a notably low vitality. As of 2014, there were "four to five confident conversational speakers who are under the age of 35." The Chickasaw language is not much used outside of the home. In terms of conservation and language vitality, Ethnologue evaluates the current language situation as moribund, and UNESCO lists Chickasaw as a "severely endangered" language, also noting that most of the ~50 speakers (as of 2019) are over fifty and almost all are bilingual in English.

=== Language revitalization ===
The Chickasaw Language Revitalization Program, founded in 2007, uses both Munro-Willmond and Humes alphabets. Because Chickasaw is a spoken language, "there is no 'right' or 'wrong' way to spell Chickasaw." Chickasaw is taught through a master-apprentice program, community programs, and self-study programs.

A "Chickasaw Language Basic" app is available for iPhone, iPad, and other iOS devices.

In a collaboration with Apple, Inc., the Chickasaw language keyboard layout is available in iOS 16.4, iPadOS 16.4 and macOS Ventura 13.3 and later to help users type with "special characters for pitch accent, nasal vowels and the glottal stop character."

=== Classes and programs ===
The Chickasaw Nation has a department of Chickasaw Language with a 24-member Chickasaw Language Committee. In 2007, the tribe founded the Chickasaw Language Revitalization Program. Four levels of Chickasaw language classes are taught at East Central University in Ada, Oklahoma. Joshua D. Hinson (called "Lokosh," meaning gourd, in the language), director of the Chickasaw Language Committee developed master-apprenticeship programs with guidance from linguist Leanne Hinton.

Chipota Chikashshanompoli is a children's language program that meets monthly. Ada, Ardmore, Norman, Purcell, Sulphur, and Tishomingo all host non-academic adult language classes. The tribe also organizes immersion camps and publishes Chickasaw language literature through the Chickasaw Press. More recently, the Chickasaw Language Revitalization Program has been working with Rosetta Stone and Ackerman McQueen, releasing a video series teaching learners how to speak Chickasaw with the Rosetta Stone Advanced Languages software.

== Phonology ==
=== Consonants ===
Chickasaw has 16 consonants. In the table below, the consonants are written in the standard Chickasaw orthography. The phonetic symbolization of each consonant is written in the International Phonetic Alphabet (IPA) to the right of each orthographic letter when the orthography differs from the IPA symbol.

Chickasaw Consonants
	Labial	Alveolar		Post- alveolar	Velar	Glottal
	Labial	median	lateral	Post- alveolar	Velar	Glottal
Nasal	m	n				
Plosive	p b	t			k	ꞌ /ʔ/
Affricate				ch /tʃ/		
Fricative	f	s	lh /ɬ/	sh /ʃ/		h
Approximant			l	y /j/	w	

- /w/ is labiovelar.
- Voiceless stops /p t k/ have a small amount of aspiration [pʰ tʰ kʰ], especially at the beginning of words.
- The voiced stop /b/ may undergo lenition to a voiced fricative [β] between vowels.
- All consonants except for the glottal stop may be geminated and most consonants can occur in biconsonantal clusters.

=== Vowels ===
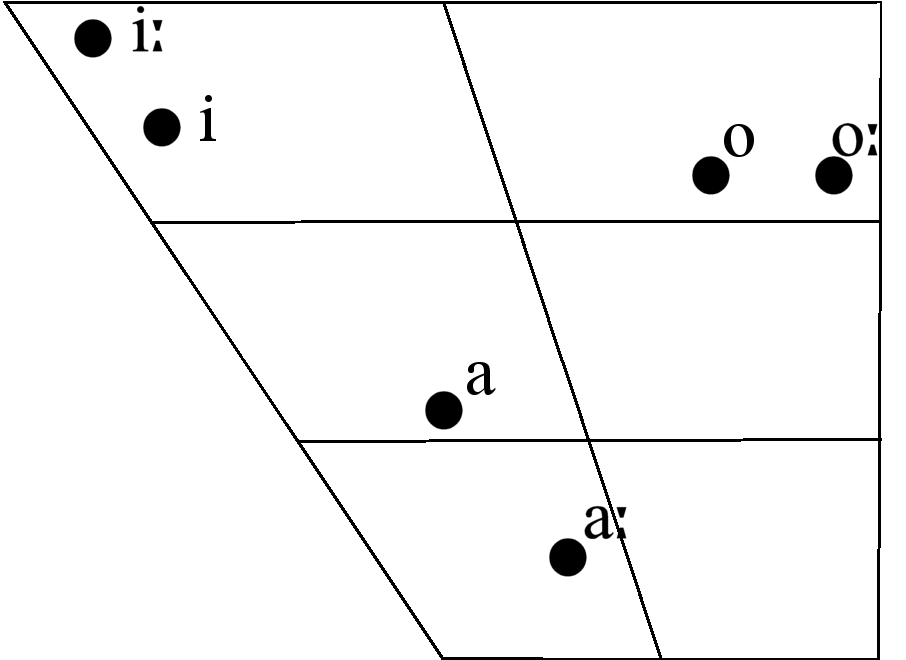
Long and short Vowels of Chickasaw. From Gordon, Munro & Ladefoged (2001:288). Nasal vowels correspond phonetically with the quality of long vowels.

Chickasaw has 9 vowels:

	Front			Central			Back		
	short	long		short	long		short	long	
	oral		nasal	oral		nasal	oral		nasal
Close	i [ɪ]	ii [iː]	i̱ [ĩː]						
Mid							o [o̟]	oo [oː]	o̱ [õː]
Open				a [ə]	aa [ɑː]	a̱ [ɑ̃ː]			

Chickasaw vowels contrast between short and long oral vowels and between long oral vowels and long nasal vowels. Short vowels are centralized (see chart): short i is phonetically [ɪ], short o is phonetically [o̟], and short a is phonetically [ə].

Short vowels are also phonetically lengthened when they occur in the second syllable of a sequence of even-numbered open syllables. For example, the word pisali ('I took him') is phonetically [pɪsəˑlɪ]. The lengthened short vowel is usually intermediate in length between a short vowel and long vowel. However, the phonetic realization varies depending on the individual speaker and also on phonetic environment. The lengthening does not occur at the end of words and is further restricted by certain morphological criteria.

Examples of Chickasaw Vowels
IPA	Example	Meaning
/i/	pisa	'she looks at him'
/iː/	piiniꞌ	'boat'
/ĩ/	i̱sintiꞌ	'his snake'
/a/	paska	'bread'
/aː/	sahashaa	'I'm angry'
/ã/	ipa̱shiꞌ	'hair'
/o/	ofiꞌ	'dog'
/oː/	ihoo	'woman'
/õ/	iso̱lash	'tongue'

=== Prosody ===
- pitch accent

== Grammar ==
=== Verb ===
==== Pronominal affixes ====
Verb arguments (i.e. subject, direct object, indirect object) are indicated with pronominal affixes (both prefixes and suffixes) which are added to verb stems. The pronominal affixes are inflected according to number (singular, plural) and person (1st, 2nd).

Chickasaw has an active–stative pronominal system with two basic series of pronominal sets: an active series (I) and a stative series (II). Additionally, Chickasaw also has dative (III), negative (N), and reciprocal (IR) series.

The active series is used for active intransitive subjects and active transitive subjects. (An active subject, simply put, is a subject that is in control of the action while a stative subject does not have control of the action. This is the difference between She fell on purpose vs. She fell accidentally where the first she controlled the falling while the second she did not control the falling.) The active series is in the table below:

active
	singular	plural
1st	-li	il- / ii-
2nd	ish-	hash-
3rd	-	

The third person lacks an affix and usually does not distinguish between singular and plural. The first person singular affix is a suffix while the other affixes are prefixes. The first person plural has two forms: il- which is used before vowels and ii- which is used before consonants — thus, il-iyya "we go", ii-malli "we jump". An example inflectional paradigm of the verb malli "to jump" is below (with the pronominal affixes underlined):

active affixes indicating subjects
	singular		plural	
1st	mallili	"I jump"	iimalli	"we jump"
2nd	ishmalli	"you jump"	hashmalli	"you all jump"
3rd	malli "he/she/it/they jump"			

The stative series (II) is below. This series is used to indicate stative intransitive subjects and direct objects.

stative
	singular	plural
1st	sa-	po-
2nd	chi-	hachi-
3rd	-	

Example with stative intransitive subjects, lhinko "to be fat":

stative affixes indicating subjects
	singular		plural	
1st	salhinko	"I am fat"	polhinko	"we are fat"
2nd	chilhinko	"you are fat"	hachilhinko	"you all are fat"
3rd	lhinko "he/she/it/they is/are fat"			

Example with direct objects, pisa "to look at (someone)" (the subject in the paradigm below is unmarked because it is in the third person):

stative affixes indicating direct objects
	singular		plural	
1st	sapisa	"he/she/it/they look at me"	popisa	"he/she/it/they look at us"
2nd	chipisa	"he/she/it/they look at you"	hachipisa	"he/she/it/they look at you all"
3rd	pisa "he/she/it/they look at him/her/it/them"			

Both active and stative affixes can occur together in which case the active affix indicates the active subject and the stative affix indicates the direct object. Active prefixes occur before stative prefixes. When ish- "active second person singular" occurs before sa- "stative first person singular", it results in issa- (the sh assimilates to s). Likewise, hash- "active second person plural" + sa- is realized as hassa-. The full paradigm of pisa "to look at" is below:

active & stative affixes together
verb form	translation	morpheme segmentation
hachipisali	"I look at you all"	hachi-pisa-li
pisali	"I look at her"	pisa-li
iichipisa	"we look at you"	ii-chi-pisa
iihachipisa	"we look at you all"	ii-hachi-pisa
iipisa	"we look at her"	ii-pisa
issapisa	"you look at me"	ish-sa-pisa
ishpopisa	"you look at us"	ish-po-pisa
ishpisa	"you look at her"	ish-pisa
hassapisa	"you all look at me"	hash-sa-pisa
hashpopisa	"you all look at us"	hash-po-pisa
hashpisa	"you all look at her"	hash-pisa
sapisa	"she looks at me"	sa-pisa
popisa	"she looks at us"	po-pisa
chipisa	"she looks at you"	chi-pisa
hachipisa	"she looks at you all"	hachi-pisa
pisa	"she looks at her"	pisa

==== Verb grades ====
- verb grades (gemination, epenthesis)

foyopa	'to breathe'
fóyyoꞌpa	'to give a sigh of relief'
foyohómpa	'to be breathing'
foyámpa	'breathing' (at same time as another action)

== General vocabulary ==
English	Chickasaw
Hello (general greeting)	Chokma/Hallito
How are you?	In order to define a question, one must use a question word (such as nanta, katiyakta, katimpi, etc.) or an affix (such as -taa, shown below, or -tam). A question can also be implied, as shown in the first and last examples: Chinchokma?; Chinchokmataa?; Chokma (a word meaning "good", saying chokma as a greeting can also imply a question of how one is doing)
I'm well. I'm very well. I'm alright. I'm not well.	The prefix "An-" implies that the speaker is referring to themselves. The suffix "-kinni" and the word "ooba" refer to the level of "wellness" that they find themselves in.: Anchokma.; Anchokmakayni.; Anchokma ooba.; Anchokma kiꞌyo.
And you? (In response)	Ishnaako̱?
Yes No Okay	The word "Hoꞌmi" can also mean okay, yes, affirmative, good, etc.: I̱i; Kiꞌyo; Hoꞌmi
I will see you later.	Speakers may vary on what they say for this phrase, as there is no word for goodbye, but it largely revolves around these three. The nasal "o" is voiced by many speakers, but many speakers also tend to leave it out. The suffix "-shki" adds a degree of confidence regarding seeing someone later. It may be translated as "I shall see you later," "I will see you later," or even "I have to see you later." "Chipisalaꞌcho̱", however, means something like "I'll see you later (not knowing when).": Chipisalaꞌcho̱.; Chipisalaꞌcho.; Chipisalaꞌshki.
I like ___. He/she likes ___. You like ___. We like ___. They like ___. Y'all like ___. Do you like ___?	In this block, we will use hattak shawiꞌ imimpaꞌ (bananas: literally, "the raccoon man's food") as an example for what the person/group likes. As for the last instance, "ch" sounds turn into "sh" sounds when suffixes beginning with a 't' are attached to the end of a word.: Hattak shawiꞌ imimpaꞌ ayokpanshli.; Hattak shawiꞌ imimpaꞌ ayokpanchi.; Hattak shawiꞌ imimpaꞌ ishayokpanchi.; Hattak shawiꞌ imimpaꞌ illayokpanchi.; Hattak shawiꞌ imimpaꞌ hooayokpanchi.; Hattak shawiꞌ imimpaꞌ hashayokpanchi.; Hattak shawiꞌ imimpaꞌ ishayokpá̱shtaa?
Deer Panther Wildcat Raccoon Bird Alligator Bear Fox Turtle Skunk Wolf Fish Squirrel Blackbird Buzzard Hawk Eagle Duck Goose Swan Turkey	All these animals are, or were, significant to Chickasaw culture and religion.: Issiꞌ; Kowishtoꞌ; Kowimilhlhaꞌ or kowiꞌ imilhlhaꞌ; Shawiꞌ; Foshiꞌ; Hachonchabaꞌ; Nitaꞌ; Chola; Loksiꞌ; Koniꞌ; Nashoba; Naniꞌ; Faniꞌ; Chalhlha; Shiiki; Akankabiꞌ; O̱siꞌ; Fochosh; Shalaklak or hanchaꞌ; Ookak; Chaloklowaꞌ
Yellow Red Pink Green/Blue Brown Orange Purple Gray Black White	As with most adjectival verbs in Chickasaw, colors will end in a glottal stop (ꞌ) when attached to a noun (ex. foshiꞌ hommaꞌ): Lakna; Homma; Hommayyi; Okchamali; Losayyi; Tako̱lo lakna; Homma chommi; Shobbokoli; Losa; Tohbi

== Bibliography ==
- Gordon, Matthew (2004). "A phonological and phonetic study of word-level stress in Chickasaw". International Journal of American Linguistics. 70 (1): 1–32. doi:10.1086/422264. S2CID 10574720.
- Gordon, Matthew; Munro, Pamela; Ladefoged, Peter (2000). "Some phonetic structures of Chickasaw". Anthropological Linguistics. 42 (3): 366–400. JSTOR 30028763.
- Gordon, Matthew; Munro, Pamela; Ladefoged, Peter (2001). "Illustrations of the IPA: Chickasaw". Journal of the International Phonetic Association. 31 (2): 287–290. doi:10.1017/s0025100301002110.
- Munro, Pamela (2005). "Chickasaw". In Hardy, Heather K.; Scancarelli, Janine (eds.). Native Languages of the Southeastern United States. Lincoln, NE: University of Nebraska Press. pp. 114–156. ISBN 978-0-8032-4235-7.
- Munro, Pamela; Willmond, Catherine (1994). Chickasaw: An analytical dictionary. Norman: University of Oklahoma Press. ISBN 9780806126623.
- Munro, Pamela; Willmond, Catherine (2008). Chikashshanompaꞌ Kilanompoliꞌ [Let's Speak Chickasaw] (in Chickasaw and English). Norman: University of Oklahoma Press. ISBN 9780806139265.
- "The Chickasaw People". University of Tennessee Martin. 2017.
