= List of rivers of Alabama =

This is a list of rivers of the US state of Alabama. Alabama has over 132,000 miles of rivers and streams with more freshwater biodiversity than any other US state. Alabama's rivers are among the most biologically diverse waterways in the world. 38% of North America's fish species, 43% of its freshwater gill-breathing snails, 51% of its freshwater turtle species, and 60% of its freshwater mussel species are native to Alabama's rivers.

== By drainage basin ==
All rivers in Alabama eventually flow into the Gulf of Mexico. This list arranges rivers into drainage basin, which are ordered by the location of the mouth of the main stem from east to west. Tributaries are ordered from mouth to source (subject to being within the borders of Alabama).

=== Gulf Coast (east) ===
Drainage basins for the main rivers draining southeastern Alabama

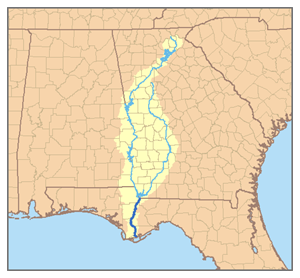
Apalachicola River

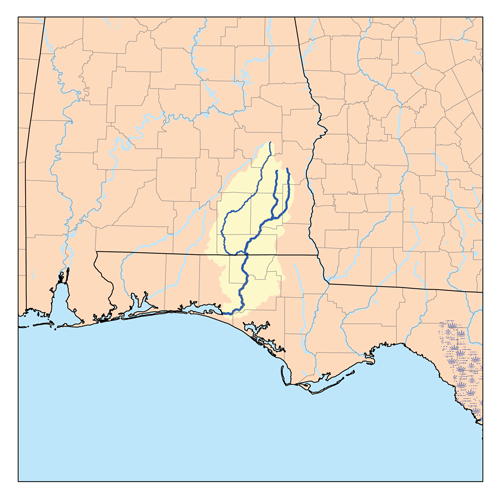
Choctawhatchee River

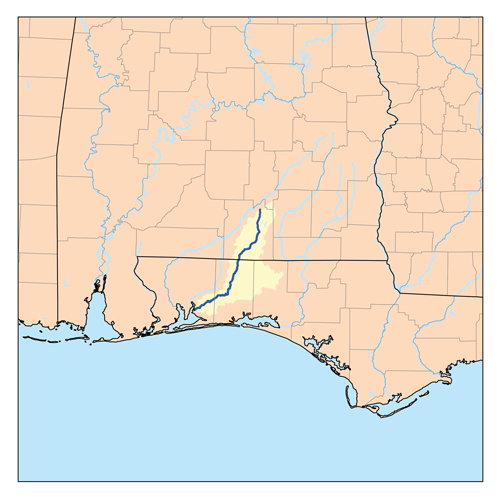
Yellow River

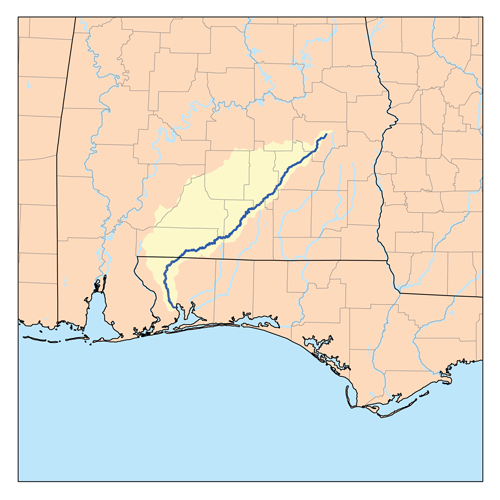
Escambia (Conecuh) River

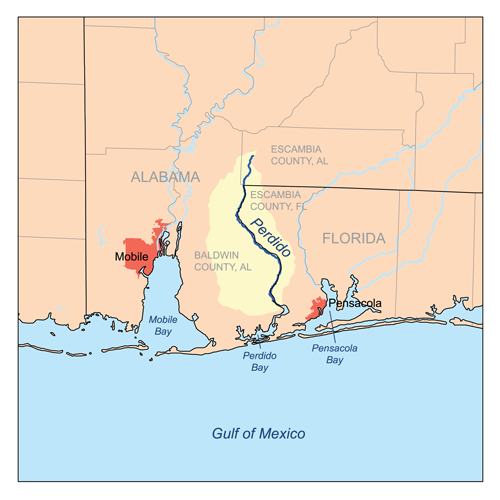
Perdido River

- Apalachicola River (FL)
  - Chattahoochee River
    - Cedar Creek
    - Omusee Creek
    - Abbie Creek
      - Sandy Creek
    - Cheneyhatchee Creek
    - Barbour Creek
    - Chewalla Creek
    - Cowikee Creek
      - North Fork Cowikee Creek
        - Middle Fork Cowikee Creek
      - South Fork Cowikee Creek
    - Hatchechubbee Creek
    - Uchee Creek
      - Little Uchee Creek
    - Wacoochee Creek
    - Halawakee Creek
    - Osanippa Creek
    - Oseligee Creek
    - Wehadkee Creek
    - Hillabahatchee Creek
- Choctawhatchee River
  - Holmes Creek
  - Wrights Creek
  - Pea River
    - Flat Creek
      - Eightmile Creek
    - Whitewater Creek
  - Double Bridges Creek
  - Claybank Creek
  - Little Choctawhatchee River
  - West Fork Choctawhatchee River
    - Judy Creek
  - East Fork Choctawhatchee River
- Yellow River
  - Shoal River (FL)
    - Pond Creek
  - Five Runs Creek
  - Lightwood Knot Creek
- Blackwater River (Pensacola Bay)
  - Big Coldwater Creek
  - Big Juniper Creek
    - Sweetwater Creek
- Escambia River (FL)
  - Conecuh River
    - Big Escambia Creek
    - Lindsey Creek
    - Murder Creek
      - Burnt Corn Creek
    - Mayo Mill Creek
    - Silas Creek
    - Sepulga River
    - Patsaliga Creek
- Perdido River
  - Blackwater River (Perdido Bay)
  - Styx River
    - Cowpen Creek
    - Hollinger Creek
- Soldier Creek
- Palmetto Creek
- Hammock Creek
- Wolf Creek
  - Miflin Creek
  - Sandy Creek
- Portage Creek

=== Mobile Bay ===
By far, the Mobile drainage basin is the largest in Alabama

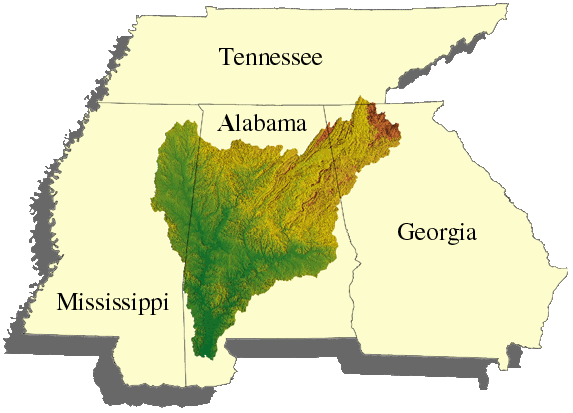
Mobile drainage basin

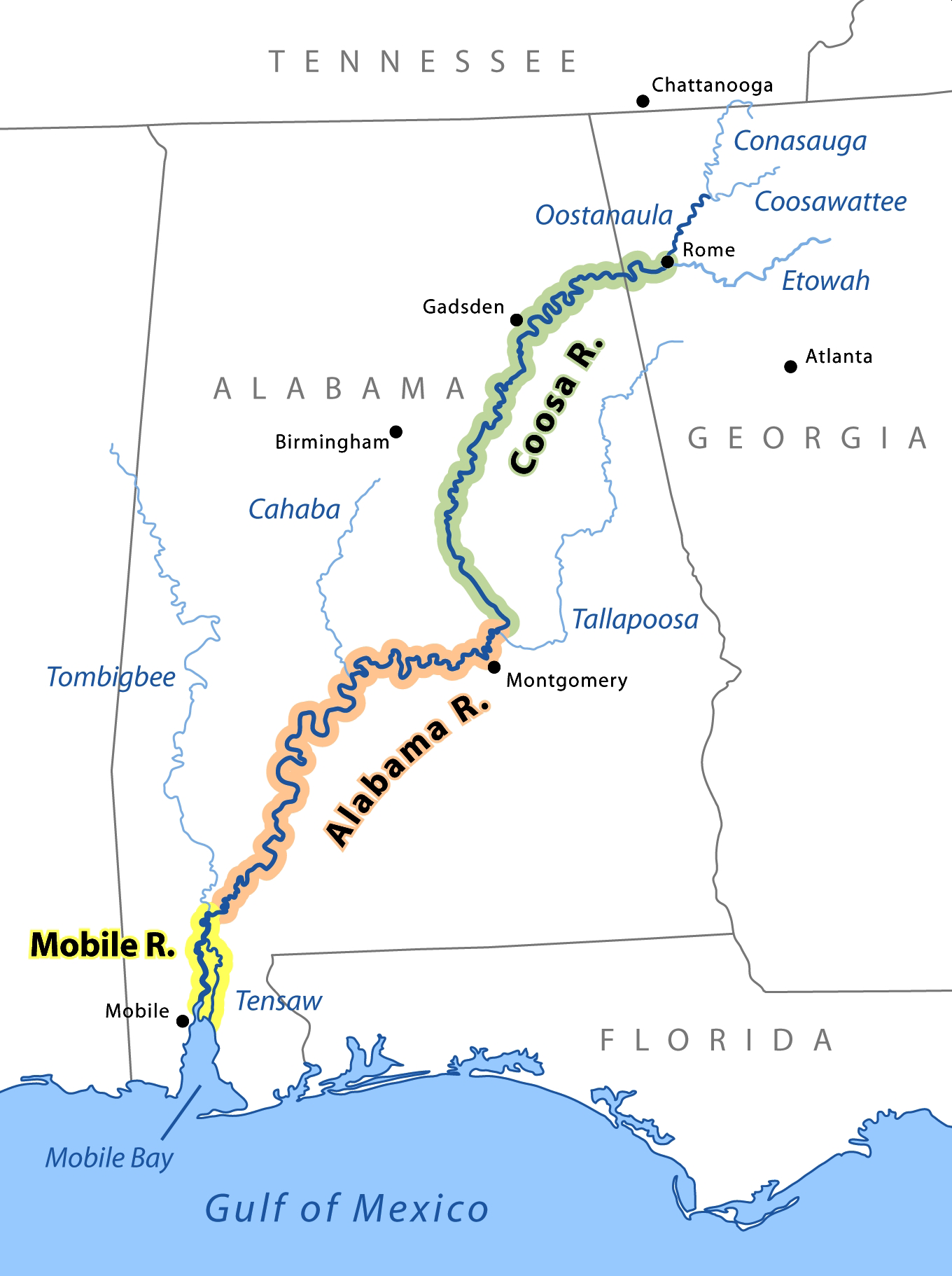
Mobile–Alabama–Coosa rivers

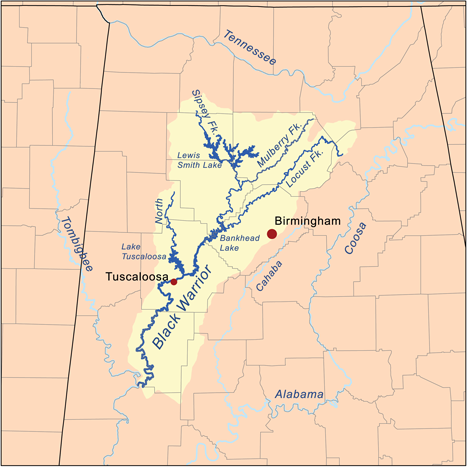
Black Warrior drainage basin

- Bon Secour River
- Magnolia River
- Fish River
- Blakeley River
  - Bay Minette Creek
- Apalachee River
- Conway Creek
- Mobile River-Tensaw River
  - Spanish River
    - Lower Crab Creek
    - Raft River
      - Oak Bayou
  - Threemile Creek
  - Chickasaw Creek
  - Crab Creek
  - Big Bayou Canot
    - Bayou Sara
      - Gunnison Creek
  - Big Lizard Creek
  - Little Lizard Creek
  - Middle River
  - Cedar Creek
  - Alabama River
    - Majors Creek
    - Limestone Creek (Alabama River tributary)
    - Big Flat Creek
      - Robinson Creek
    - Cane Creek
    - Bear Creek (Alabama River tributary)
    - Pursley Creek
    - Beaver Creek
      - Goose Creek
      - Turkey Creek
    - Dixon Creek
    - Pine Barren Creek
      - Bear Creek (Pine Barren Creek tributary)
      - Sturdivant Creek
    - Chilatchee Creek
      - Sand Creek
    - Bogue Chitto Creek
      - Bear Creek (Bogue Chitto Creek tributary)
      - Chaney Creek
      - Mud Creek
    - Cedar Creek
      - Mush Creek
    - Cahaba River
      - Oakmulgee Creek
      - Schultz Creek
        - Hill Creek
      - Little Cahaba River (Bibb County, Alabama)
        - Mahan Creek
        - Shoal Creek
      - Shades Creek
      - Piney Woods Creek
      - Buck Creek
      - Patton Creek
      - Little Cahaba River (Jefferson County, Alabama)
      - Big Black Creek
    - Soapstone Creek
    - Mulberry Creek
      - Little Mulberry Creek
      - Benson Creek
    - Old Town Creek
    - Big Swamp Creek
      - Rambo Branch
    - Ivy Creek
    - Swift Creek
    - Tallawassee Creek
    - Pintlala Creek
    - Catoma Creek
    - Autauga Creek
    - Tallapoosa River
      - Chubbehatchee Creek
      - Line Creek (Alabama)
      - Cubahatchee Creek
      - Calebee Creek
      - Uphapee Creek
      - Hillabee Creek
        - Enitachopco Creek
          - Little Hillabee Creek
            - Harbuck Creek
      - Emuckfaw Creek
      - Chatahospee Creek
      - High Pine Creek
      - Cornhouse Creek
      - Crooked Creek
        - Wesobulga Creek
      - Little Tallapoosa River
        - Wedowee Creek
      - Muscadine Creek
    - Coosa River
      - Mortar Creek
        - Cottonford Creek
      - Callaway Creek
      - Weoka Creek
        - Little Weoka Creek
      - Chestnut Creek
      - Hatchet Creek
        - Weogufka Creek
        - Swamp Creek
        - Socapatoy Creek
      - Walnut Creek
      - Yellow Leaf Creek
      - Paint Creek
      - Waxahatchee Creek
        - Buxahatchee Creek
      - Peckerwood Creek
      - Yellowleaf Creek
      - Tallaseehatchee Creek (Coosa River tributary)
        - Shirtee Creek
        - Emauhee Creek
      - Talladega Creek
      - Kelly Creek (Coosa River tributary)
      - Choccolocco Creek
        - Cheaha Creek
          - Kelly Creek (Cheaha Creek tributary)
      - Cane Creek
      - Ohatchee Creek
        - Tallaseehatchee Creek (Ohatchee Creek tributary)
      - Big Canoe Creek
      - Big Wills Creek
      - Terrapin Creek
        - Hurricane Creek
        - Nances Creek
      - Little River
        - East Fork Little River
        - West Fork Little River
      - Chattooga River
        - Culstigh Creek
        - Mills Creek
  - Tombigbee River
    - West River
      - Bates Creek
      - Bilbo Creek
    - Bassetts Creek (west side Tombigbee River tributary)
    - Bassett Creek (east side Tombigbee River tributary)
    - Jackson Creek
    - Santa Bogue Creek
      - Dry Creek
    - Turkey Creek
    - Okatuppa Creek
      - Souwilpa Creek
      - Puss Cuss Creek
    - Big Tallawampa Creek
      - Little Tallawampa Creek
    - Bashi Creek
    - Wahalak Creek
    - Sucarbowa Creek
    - Horse Creek
    - Tuckabum Creek
      - Yantley Creek
      - Bogue Chitto
    - Beaver Creek
    - Kinterbish Creek
    - Chickasaw Bogue
      - Dry Creek
    - Cotohaga Creek
    - Sucarnoochee River
      - Alamuchee Creek
    - Spring Creek
      - Lost Creek
    - Hall Creek
    - Black Warrior River
      - Big Prairie Creek
      - Big Brush Creek
      - Minter Creek
      - Fivemile Creek
      - Grant Creek
      - Big Sandy Creek
      - North River
      - Hurricane Creek
      - Davis Creek
      - Blue Creek
      - Big Yellow Creek
      - Valley Creek
        - Mud Creek
      - Locust Fork
        - Short Creek
        - Village Creek
        - Fivemile Creek
        - Turkey Creek
        - Gurley Creek
        - Little Warrior River
          - Blackburn Fork Little Warrior River
          - Calvert Prong Little Warrior River
        - Slab Creek
      - Mulberry Fork
        - Lost Creek
          - Wolf Creek
            - Indian Creek
          - Cane Creek (Lost Creek tributary)
          - Mill Creek
        - Cane Creek (Mulberry Fork)
        - Blackwater Creek
        - Sipsey Fork
          - Ryan Creek
          - Rock Creek
            - Crooked Creek
            - Blevens Creek
          - Clear Creek
            - Right Fork Clear Creek
          - Brushy Creek
            - Capsey Creek
            - Rush Creek
          - Caney Creek
          - Borden Creek
        - Broglen River
          - Eightmile Creek
        - Duck River
    - Brush Creek
    - Trussells Creek
    - Noxubee River
      - Bodka Creek
      - Woodward Creek
    - Sipsey River
      - New River
      - Little New River
    - Lubbub Creek
      - Bear Creek (Lubbub Creek tributary)
    - Big Creek
    - Luxapallila Creek
      - Yellow Creek
    - Buttahatchee River
      - Sipsey Creek
    - Bull Mountain Creek
      - Gum Creek
- Dog River
  - Perch Creek
  - Alligator Bayou
  - Rabbit Creek
    - Rattlesnake Bayou
  - Halls Mill Creek
  - Moore Creek
    - Bolton Branch
      - Eslava Creek
  - Robinson Bayou
- Middle Fork Deer River
  - North Fork Deer River
- South Fork Deer River
- Fowl River
  - East Fowl River
  - West Fowl River
  - Dykes Creek

=== Gulf Coast (west) ===
- Heron Bayou
- Bayou Sullivan
- Bayou Coden
- Bayou la Batre
- Little River

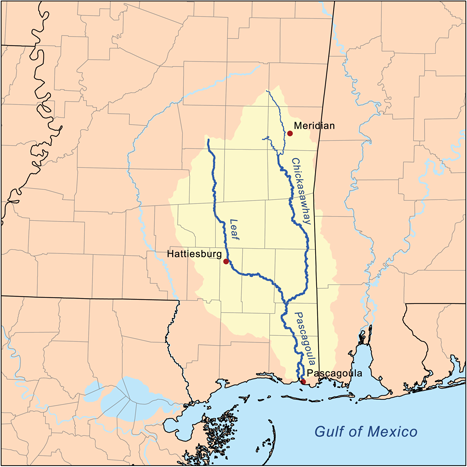
Pascagoula drainage basin

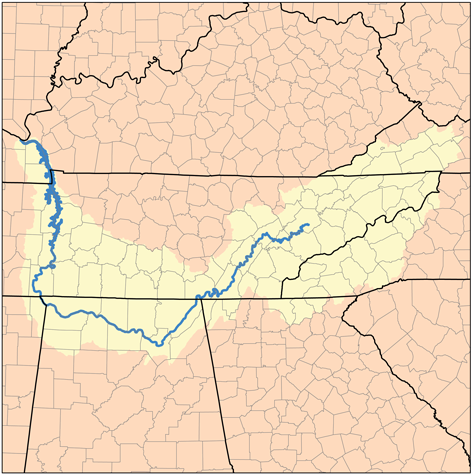
Tennessee drainage basin

- Pascagoula River (MS)
  - Escatawpa River
    - Bennett Creek
    - Little Creek
      - Pond Creek

=== Mississippi River ===
- Mississippi River (LA, MS, TN, KY)
  - Ohio River (KY)
    - Tennessee River
      - Bear Creek
        - Buzzard Roost Creek
        - Cedar Creek
          - Little Bear Creek
      - Second Creek
      - Mulberry Creek
      - Cane Creek
      - Little Bear Creek
      - Spring Creek
      - Cypress Creek
        - Little Cypress Creek
      - Shoal Creek
        - Butler Creek
      - Town Creek
        - Mud Creek
      - Bluewater Creek
      - Big Nance Creek
        - Clear Fork
        - Muddy Fork
      - Second Creek
      - Elk River
        - Anderson Creek
        - Sugar Creek
        - Sulphur Creek
        - Big Creek
      - Flint Creek
        - West Flint Creek
        - No Business Creek
      - Limestone Creek
        - Piney Creek
      - Cotaco Creek
        - Town Creek
      - Indian Creek
        - Huntsville Spring Branch
          - Broglan Branch
      - Flint River
        - Hurricane Creek (Flint River tributary)
        - Brier Fork Flint River
        - Mountain Fork
      - Paint Rock River
        - Hurricane Creek (Paint Rock River tributary)
        - Estill Fork
      - Big Spring Creek
      - Short Creek
        - Scarham Creek
      - Town Creek
      - South Sauty Creek
        - Kirby Creek
      - North Sauty Creek
        - Blue Spring Creek (North Sauty Creek tributary)
      - Mud Creek
        - Robinson Creek (Mud Creek tributary)
      - Coon Creek
      - Crow Creek
        - Big Coon Creek
      - Widows Creek
      - Long Island Creek (Tennessee River tributary)
      - Jones Creek
      - Lookout Creek

== Alphabetically ==
- Abbie Creek
- Alabama River
- Alamuchee Creek
- Alligator Bayou
- Anderson Creek
- Apalachee River
- Autauga Creek
- Barbour Creek
- Bashi Creek
- Bassett Creek (east side Tombigbee River tributary)
- Bassetts Creek (west side Tombigbee River tributary)
- Bates Creek
- Bay Minette Creek
- Bayou Coden
- Bayou la Batre
- Bayou Sara
- Bayou Sullivan
- Bear Creek (Alabama River tributary)
- Bear Creek (Bogue Chitto Creek tributary)
- Bear Creek (Lubbub Creek tributary)
- Bear Creek (Pine Barren Creek tributary)
- Bear Creek (Tennessee River tributary)
- Beaver Creek (Alabama River tributary)
- Beaver Creek (Tombigbee River tributary)
- Bennett Creek
- Benson Creek
- Big Bayou Canot
- Big Black Creek
- Big Brush Creek
- Big Canoe Creek
- Big Coldwater Creek
- Big Coon Creek
- Big Creek
- Big Escambia Creek
- Big Flat Creek
- Big Juniper Creek
- Big Lizard Creek
- Big Nance Creek
- Big Prairie Creek
- Big Sandy Creek
- Big Spring Creek
- Big Swamp Creek
- Big Tallawampa Creek
- Big Wills Creek
- Big Yellow Creek
- Bilbo Creek
- Black Warrior River
- Blackburn Fork Little Warrior River
- Blackwater Creek
- Blackwater River (Pensacola Bay)
- Blackwater River (Perdido Bay)
- Blakeley River
- Blevens Creek
- Blue Creek
- Blue Spring Creek (North Sauty Creek tributary)
- Bluewater Creek
- Bodka Creek
- Bogue Chitto (Tuckabum Creek tributary)
- Bogue Chitto Creek, Alabama River tributary
- Bolton Branch
- Bon Secour River
- Borden Creek
- Brier Fork Flint River
- Broglan Branch
- Broglen River
- Brush Creek
- Brushy Creek
- Buck Creek
- Bull Mountain Creek
- Burnt Corn Creek
- Butler Creek
- Buttahatchee River
- Buxahatchee Creek
- Buzzard Roost Creek
- Cahaba River
- Calebee Creek
- Callaway Creek
- Calvert Prong Little Warrior River
- Cane Creek (Alabama River tributary)
- Cane Creek (Coosa River tributary)
- Cane Creek (Lost Creek tributary)
- Cane Creek (Mulberry Fork)
- Cane Creek (Tennessee River tributary)
- Caney Creek
- Capsey Creek
- Catoma Creek
- Cedar Creek (Alabama River tributary)
- Cedar Creek (Bear Creek tributary)
- Cedar Creek (Chattahoochee River tributary)
- Cedar Creek (Mobile River tributary)
- Chaney Creek
- Chatahospee Creek
- Chattahoochee River
- Chattooga River
- Cheaha Creek
- Cheneyhatchee Creek
- Chestnut Creek
- Chewalla Creek
- Chickasaw Bogue
- Chickasaw Creek
- Chilatchee Creek
- Choccolocco Creek
- Choctawhatchee River
- Chubbehatchee Creek
- Claybank Creek
- Clear Creek
- Clear Fork (Big Nance Creek tributary)
- Conecuh River
- Conway Creek
- Coon Creek
- Coosa River
- Cornhouse Creek
- Cotaco Creek
- Cotohaga Creek
- Cottonford Creek
- Cowikee Creek
- Cowpen Creek
- Crab Creek
- Crooked Creek (Rock Creek tributary)
- Crooked Creek (Tallapoosa River tributary)
- Crow Creek
- Cubahatchee Creek
- Cypress Creek
- Davis Creek
- Dixon Creek
- Dog River
- Double Bridges Creek
- Dry Creek (Chickasaw Bogue)
- Dry Creek (Santa Bogue Creek tributary)
- Duck River
- Dykes Creek
- East Fork Choctawhatchee River
- East Fork Little River
- East Fowl River
- Eightmile Creek (Broglen River tributary)
- Eightmile Creek (Flat Creek tributary)
- Elk River
- Emauhee Creek
- Emuckfaw Creek
- Enitachopco Creek
- Escambia River
- Escatawpa River
- Eslava Creek
- Estill Fork
- Fish River
- Five Runs Creek
- Fivemile Creek (Black Warrior River tributary)
- Fivemile Creek (Locust Fork)
- Flat Creek
- Flint Creek
- Flint River
- Fowl River
- Goose Creek
- Grant Creek
- Gum Creek
- Gunnison Creek
- Gurley Creek
- Halawakee Creek
- Hall Creek
- Halls Mill Creek
- Hammock Creek
- Harbuck Creek
- Hatchechubbee Creek
- Hatchet Creek
- Heron Bayou
- High Pine Creek
- Hill Creek
- Hillabahatchee Creek
- Hillabee Creek
- Hollinger Creek
- Holmes Creek
- Horse Creek
- Huntsville Spring Branch
- Hurricane Creek (Black Warrior River tributary)
- Hurricane Creek (Flint River tributary)
- Hurricane Creek (Paint Rock River tributary)
- Hurricane Creek (Terrapin Creek tributary)
- Indian Creek (Tennessee River tributary)
- Indian Creek (Wolf Creek tributary)
- Ivy Creek
- Jackson Creek
- Jones Creek
- Judy Creek
- Kelly Creek (Cheaha Creek tributary)
- Kelly Creek (Coosa River tributary)
- Kinterbish Creek
- Kirby Creek
- Lightwood Knot Creek
- Limestone Creek
- Lindsey Creek
- Line Creek (Alabama)
- Little Bear Creek (Bear Creek tributary)
- Little Bear Creek (Tennessee River tributary)
- Little Cahaba River (Bibb County, Alabama)
- Little Cahaba River (Jefferson County, Alabama)
- Little Choctawhatchee River
- Little Creek
- Little Cypress Creek
- Little Hillabee Creek
- Little Lizard Creek
- Little Mulberry Creek
- Little New River
- Little River, Coosa River tributary
- Little River (Portersville Bay)
- Little Tallapoosa River
- Little Tallawampa Creek
- Little Uchee Creek
- Little Warrior River
- Little Weoka Creek
- Locust Fork
- Long Island Creek (Tennessee River tributary)
- Lookout Creek
- Lost Creek (Mulberry Fork)
- Lost Creek (Spring Creek tributary)
- Lower Crab Creek
- Lubbub Creek
- Luxapallila Creek
- Magnolia River
- Mahan Creek
- Majors Creek
- Mayo Mill Creek
- Middle Fork Cowikee Creek
- Middle Fork Deer River
- Middle River
- Miflin Creek
- Mill Creek
- Mills Creek
- Minter Creek
- Mobile River
- Moore Creek
- Mortar Creek
- Mountain Fork
- Mud Creek
- Mud Creek (Tennessee River tributary)
- Mud Creek (Town Creek tributary)
- Mud Creek (Valley Creek tributary)
- Muddy Fork
- Mulberry Creek (Alabama River tributary)
- Mulberry Creek (Tennessee River tributary)
- Mulberry Fork
- Murder Creek
- Muscadine Creek
- Mush Creek
- Nances Creek
- New River
- No Business Creek
- North Fork Cowikee Creek
- North Fork Deer River
- North River
- North Sauty Creek
- Noxubee River
- Oak Bayou
- Oakmulgee Creek
- Ohatchee Creek
- Okatuppa Creek
- Old Town Creek
- Omusee Creek
- Osanippa Creek
- Oseligee Creek
- Paint Creek
- Paint Rock River
- Palmetto Creek
- Patsaliga Creek
- Patton Creek
- Pea River
- Peckerwood Creek
- Perch Creek
- Perdido River
- Pine Barren Creek
- Piney Creek
- Piney Woods Creek
- Pintlala Creek
- Pond Creek (Little Creek tributary)
- Pond Creek (Shoal River tributary)
- Portage Creek
- Pursley Creek
- Puss Cuss Creek
- Rabbit Creek
- Raft River
- Rambo Branch
- Rattlesnake Bayou
- Right Fork Clear Creek
- Robinson Bayou
- Robinson Creek (Mud Creek tributary)
- Rock Creek
- Rush Creek
- Ryan Creek
- Sand Creek
- Sandy Creek (Abbie Creek tributary)
- Sandy Creek (Wolf Creek tributary)
- Santa Bogue Creek
- Scarham Creek
- Schultz Creek
- Second Creek (Pickwick Lake)
- Second Creek (Wheeler Lake)
- Sepulga River
- Shades Creek
- Shirtee Creek
- Shoal Creek (Little Cahaba River tributary)
- Shoal Creek (Tennessee River tributary)
- Short Creek (Locust Fork)
- Short Creek (Tennessee River tributary)
- Silas Creek
- Sipsey Creek
- Sipsey River
- Sipsey Fork
- Slab Creek
- Soapstone Creek
- Socapatoy Creek
- Soldier Creek
- South Fork Cowikee Creek
- South Fork Deer River
- South Sauty Creek
- Souwilpa Creek
- Spanish River
- Spring Creek (Tennessee River tributary)
- Spring Creek (Tombigbee River tributary)
- Sturdivant Creek
- Styx River
- Sucarbowa Creek
- Sucarnoochee River
- Sugar Creek
- Swamp Creek
- Sweetwater Creek
- Swift Creek
- Talladega Creek
- Tallapoosa River
- Tallaseehatchee Creek (Coosa River tributary)
- Tallaseehatchee Creek (Ohatchee Creek tributary)
- Tallawassee Creek
- Tennessee River
- Tensaw River
- Terrapin Creek
- Threemile Creek
- Tombigbee River
- Town Creek (Cotaco Creek tributary)
- Town Creek (Guntersville Lake)
- Town Creek (Wilson Lake)
- Trussells Creek
- Tuckabum Creek
- Turkey Creek (Beaver Creek tributary)
- Turkey Creek (Locust Fork)
- Turkey Creek (Tombigbee River tributary)
- Uchee Creek
- Uphapee Creek
- Valley Creek
- Village Creek
- Wacoochee Creek
- Wahalak Creek
- Walnut Creek
- Waxahatchee Creek
- Wedowee Creek
- Wehadkee Creek
- Weogufka Creek
- Weoka Creek
- Wesobulga Creek
- West Flint Creek
- West Fork Choctawhatchee River
- West Fork Little River
- West Fowl River
- West River
- Whitewater Creek
- Wrights Creek
- Widows Creek
- Wolf Creek (Lost Creek tributary)
- Wolf Creek (Perdido Bay)
- Woodward Creek
- Yantley Creek
- Yellow Creek
- Yellow Leaf Creek
- Yellow River
- Yellowleaf Creek

== See also ==
- List of rivers in the United States
