= Sipsey =

Sipsey is the name of several features in the U.S. state of Alabama:

- Sipsey, Alabama, a town in Walker County
- The Sipsey Wilderness, a wilderness area in the Bankhead National Forest
- Sipsey Fork of the Black Warrior River, flowing through the Sipsey Wilderness
- The Sipsey River and swamp near Tuscaloosa, unrelated to the Sipsey Fork of the Black Warrior Rive

== See also ==
- Sipsey Creek (disambiguation)
- Sipsey Fork (disambiguation)
