= Eva, Alabama =

- Town
- Location in Morgan County, Alabama
- Coordinates: 34°19′30″N 86°44′51″W
- Country: United States
- State: Alabama
- County: Morgan

Area
  - Total: 4.30 sq mi (11.14 km^{2})
  - Land: 4.27 sq mi (11.06 km^{2})
  - Water: 0.031 sq mi (0.08 km^{2})
- Elevation: 1,066 ft (325 m)

Population (2020)
  - Total: 589
  - Density: 137.9/sq mi (53.25/km^{2})
- Time zone: UTC-6 (Central (CST))
  - Summer (DST): UTC-5 (CDT)
- ZIP code: 35621
- Area code: 256
- FIPS code: 01-24688
- GNIS feature ID: 2406472
- Website: www.townofeva.com

Eva is a town in Morgan County, Alabama, United States, and is included in the Decatur Metropolitan Area and the Huntsville-Decatur Combined Statistical Area. As of the 2020 census, the population of the town was 589, up from 519 in 2010. The mayor currently is Kent Chambers.

== History ==
Originally called "Cowhead", the town began to be settled in 1820, just a year after Alabama achieved statehood. William J. Rook began a post office in Cowhead in 1883; however, it was closed a month later. According to local lore, at a community meeting, the town received its current name "Eva" in October 1883 at the suggestion of a local physician, Dr. Lewis Keller, who had just delivered a beautiful baby girl by that name, Eva Brandon. He liked that name because like the girl, the town was just getting started. After discussion, the community agreed upon the name Eva because the town needed a new name as a prerequisite for establishing a new post office. It was not until 1887 that the town's name was officially changed from Cowhead.

In 1916, Mr. Wiley Steward, local sawmill owner, donated 5 acres (2.0 ha) of land to the town, for the construction of a new school. In 1918, using donations from the local community, Eva gazed with admiration upon a beautiful new four-room schoolhouse. As time went by, the need for higher educational training for the community was realized. In an effort spearheaded by local physician J. G. Daves, later deemed "the father of Eva School", in the 1920s a community campaign was set forth to raise the necessary funds to build another school. Even the Great Depression could not hold this thriving community down from its dream of higher education for its children.

It was a community undertaking, but the fairy tale dream of a resolute community was realized in 1930, when Eva became a proud possessor of an accredited high school and held graduation exercises with a senior class composed of three members.

The community forged ahead and in its desire to add to the curriculum of the school, through local donations, added a vocational agriculture building, elementary building, and in 1938 completed a large stone gymnasium.

In 1972, with the opening of Albert P. Brewer High School in Florette, Eva High School was consolidated into this new east regional Morgan County High School facility.

In 1996, the Morgan County Board of Education, through a capital funds campus upgrade, demolished the old school buildings, excluding the gymnasium that was constructed in 1985 and the old lunchroom building, constructed in the mid 1960s. The campus was rebuilt, with a beautiful new modern K-8 building. Today, Eva School, as it has done for a century, continues to serve as source of pride for the Eva community.

Eva incorporated as a town in 1963.

== Geography ==
Eva is located in southeastern Morgan County. Its southern border touches the border with Cullman County. It is 15 miles (24 km) southeast of Hartselle and 28 miles (45 km) south-southeast of Decatur, the Morgan county seat. Cullman is 13 miles (21 km) to the southwest, and Arab is 18 miles (29 km) to the east.

According to the U.S. Census Bureau, the town of Eva has a total area of 4.3 square miles (11 km^{2}), of which 0.03 square miles (0.08 km^{2}), or 0.74%, are water. The town center, at an elevation of 1,105 feet (337 m) above sea level, is just north of the Tennessee Valley Divide. The town drains west toward Flint Creek and east toward Cotaco Creek, both of which are north-flowing tributaries of the Tennessee River. The southernmost parts of town drain south to Eightmile Creek, a tributary of the Broglen River and part of the Mulberry Fork of the Black Warrior River watershed.

== Demographics ==
Historical population
Census	Pop.	Note	%±
1970	146		—
1980	185		26.7%
1990	438		136.8%
2000	491		12.1%
2010	519		5.7%
2020	589		13.5%
U.S. Decennial Census; 2013 Estimate

As of the census of 2000, there were 491 people, 194 households, and 152 families residing in the town. The population density was 168.0 inhabitants per square mile (64.9/km^{2}). There were 213 housing units at an average density of 72.9 per square mile (28.1/km^{2}). The racial makeup of the town was 98.37% White, 0.20% Native American, and 1.43% from two or more races. 0.41% of the population were Hispanic or Latino of any race.

There were 194 households, out of which 31.4% had children under the age of 18 living with them, 68.0% were married couples living together, 7.7% had a female householder with no husband present, and 21.6% were non-families. 18.6% of all households were made up of individuals, and 7.7% had someone living alone who was 65 years of age or older. The average household size was 2.53 and the average family size was 2.91.

In the town, the population was spread out, with 21.6% under the age of 18, 7.7% from 18 to 24, 29.9% from 25 to 44, 26.3% from 45 to 64, and 14.5% who were 65 years of age or older. The median age was 40 years. For every 100 females, there were 98.8 males. For every 100 females age 18 and over, there were 89.7 males.

The median income for a household in the town was $38,958, and the median income for a family was $45,781. Males had a median income of $32,159 versus $21,875 for females. The per capita income for the town was $19,069. About 7.2% of families and 6.7% of the population were below the poverty line, including 3.2% of those under age 18 and 13.2% of those age 65 or over.

== Notable people ==
- Edsel Ford, poet
- Susan Parker, 37th State Auditor of Alabama
