= Sipsey Creek =

Sipsey Creek may refer to:

- Sipsey Creek (Buttahatchee River tributary), a stream in Mississippi
- Sipsey Creek (Tuscolameta Creek tributary), a stream in Mississippi

== See also ==
- Sipsey Fork (disambiguation)
- Sipsey River
