= Bassett Creek =

Bassett Creek may refer to:

- Bassett Creek (Crystal, Minnesota), a neighborhood of Crystal, Minnesota
- Bassett Creek (Mississippi River tributary), Minnesota, a tributary of the Mississippi River
- Bassett Creek (Tombigbee River tributary), Alabama
