= Sipsey Fork =

Sipsey Fork may refer to one of the following:

- Sipsey Fork, Mississippi
- Sipsey Fork of the Black Warrior River

== See also ==
- Sipsey Creek (disambiguation)
- Sipsey (disambiguation)
