= Blakeley River =

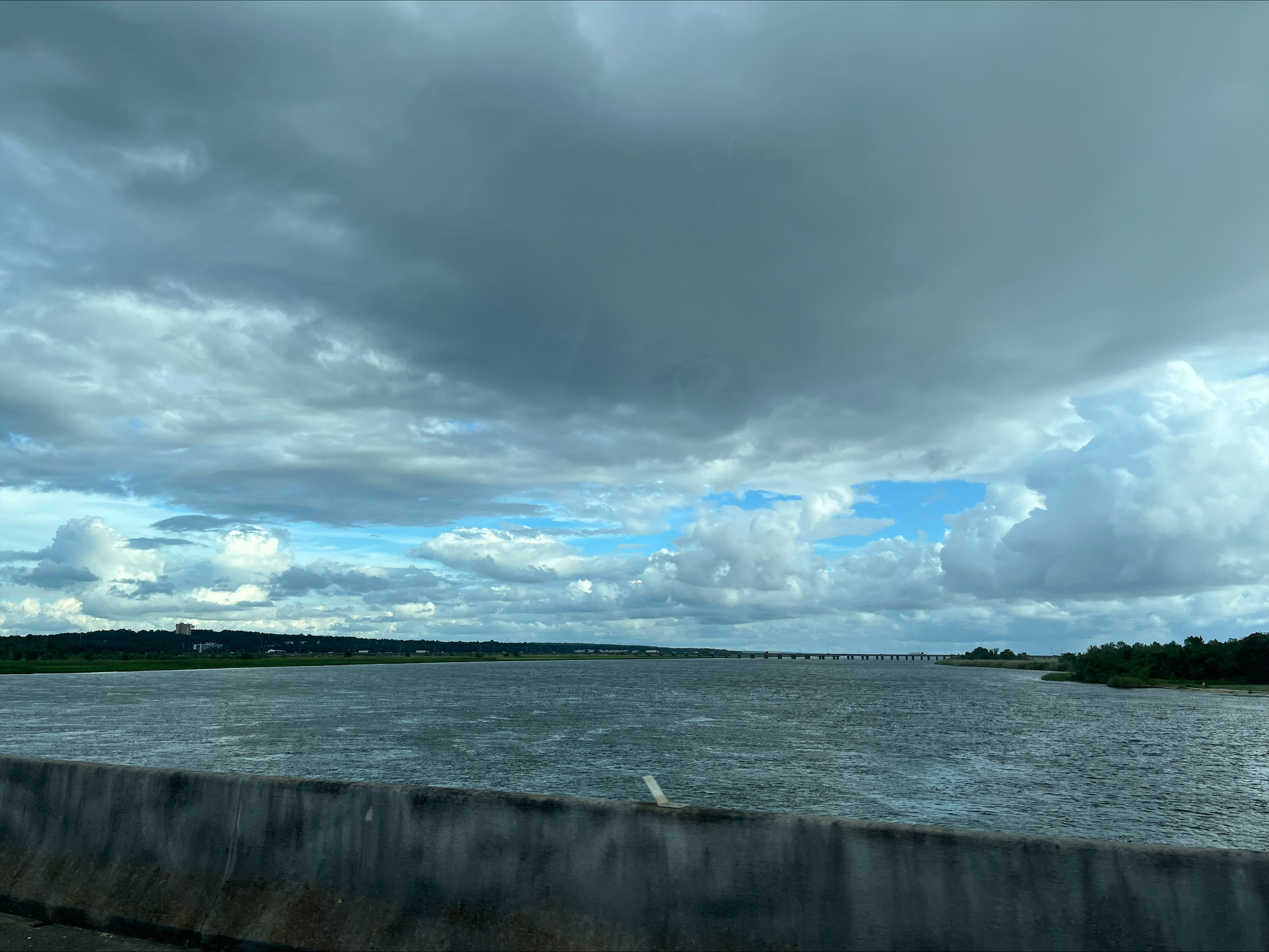
- Blakely River from U.S. Route 98 in Baldwin County, Alabama

Physical characteristics
- Source
  - coordinates: 30.69972°N 87.93361°W
- Mouth
  - coordinates: 30.64769°N 87.92749°W
- Length: 3 mi (4.8 km)

The Blakeley River is a distributary river in Baldwin County, Alabama that forms part of the Mobile-Tensaw River Delta. It branches off from the Apalachee River at 30.69972°N 87.93361°W. From there it flows southward for approximately 3 miles (4.8 km) before emptying into Mobile Bay at 30.64769°N 87.92749°W.

== See also ==
- List of Alabama rivers
