= Apalachee River =

Apalachee River may refer to:

- Apalachee River (Alabama)
- Apalachee River (Georgia)
