= Uchee Creek =

Uchee Creek may refer to:

- Uchee Creek (Alabama)
- Uchee Creek (Georgia)
