= Puss Cuss Creek =

Stream in Choctaw County, Alabama U.S.

Coordinates: 31°54′06″N 88°22′25″W

Puss Cuss Creek is a stream in Choctaw County, Alabama in the United States. It is a tributary of Okatuppa Creek.

The name Puss Cuss is derived from a Choctaw phrase meaning "child crying".

== See also ==
- List of rivers of Alabama
