= Edsel Ford (disambiguation) =

Edsel Ford was the son of Henry Ford and president of Ford Motor Company.

Edsel Ford may also refer to:

- Edsel, a failed brand of Ford Motor Company
- Edsel Ford (poet) (1928–1970), American poet
- Edsel Ford II (born 1948), American businessman and great-grandson of Henry Ford
- Edsel Ford High School, Dearborn, Michigan
- Edsel Ford Freeway, a section of Interstate 94 in Detroit, Michigan

== See also ==
- Edsel and Eleanor Ford House, Grosse Pointe Shores, Michigan, on the National Register of Historic Places
- Edsel Ford Fong (1927–1984), famously rude American waiter
