= Buzzard Roost Creek =

Stream in Colbert County, Alabama, U.S.

Coordinates: 34°46′23″N 88°04′54″W

Buzzard Roost Creek is a stream in Colbert County in the northwestern corner of the U.S. state of Alabama. It is a tributary of Bear Creek within Pickwick Lake.
