= Sipsey Wilderness =

Wilderness area in Alabama, United States

- IUCN category Ib (wilderness area)
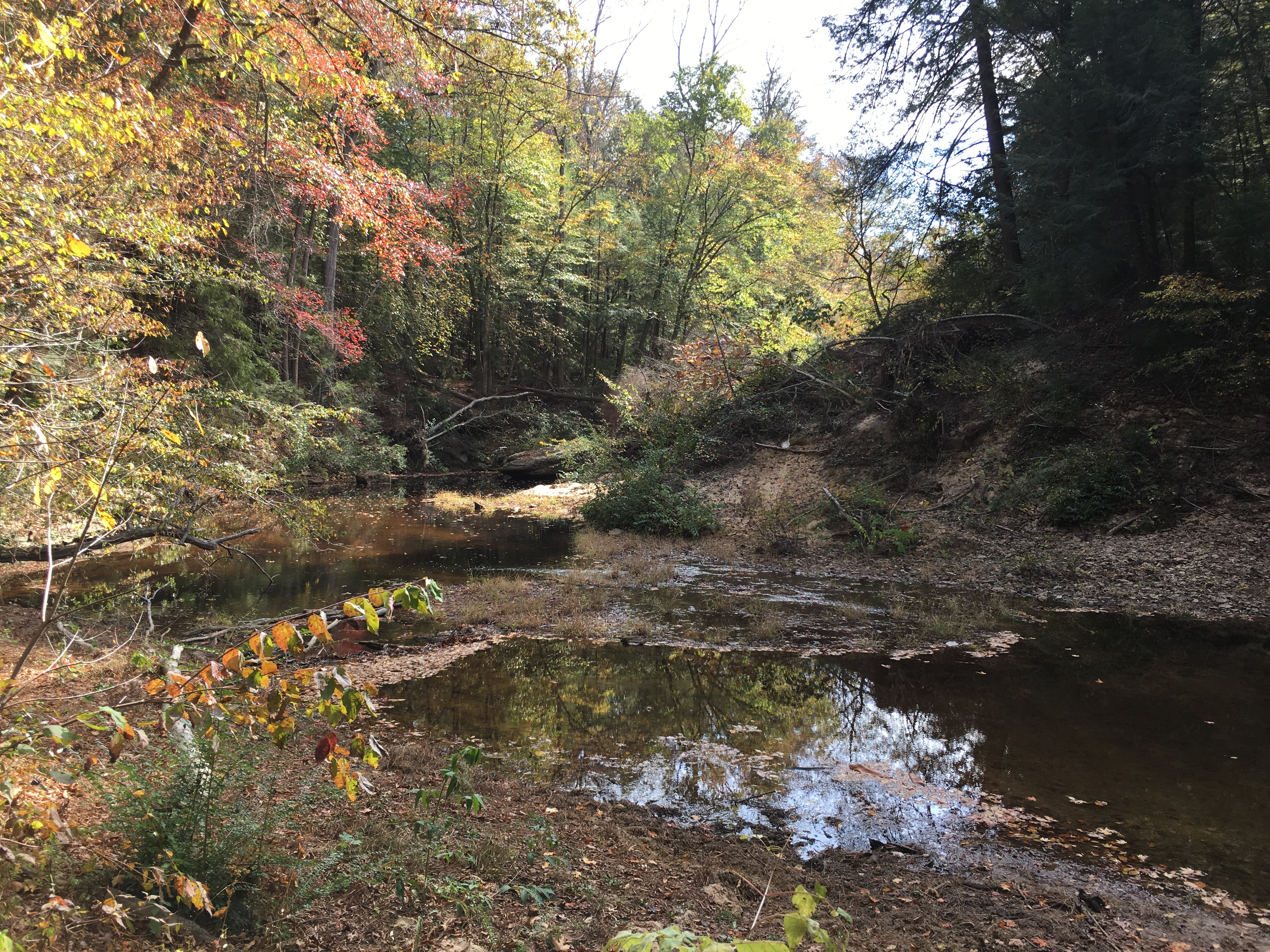
- Sipsey River

- Location within the United States Location within Alabama
- Location: Lawrence / Winston counties, Alabama, United States
- Nearest city: Haleyville, Alabama
- Coordinates: 34°19′30″N 87°27′05″W
- Area: 24,922 acres (100.86 km^{2})
- Established: January 3, 1975
- Governing body: U.S. Forest Service

The Sipsey Wilderness lies within Bankhead National Forest around the Sipsey Fork of the Black Warrior River in northwestern Alabama, United States. Designated in 1975 and expanded in 1988, 24,922-acre (10,086 ha) Sipsey is the largest and most frequently visited Wilderness area in Alabama and contains dozens of waterfalls. It was also the first designated wilderness area east of the Mississippi River.

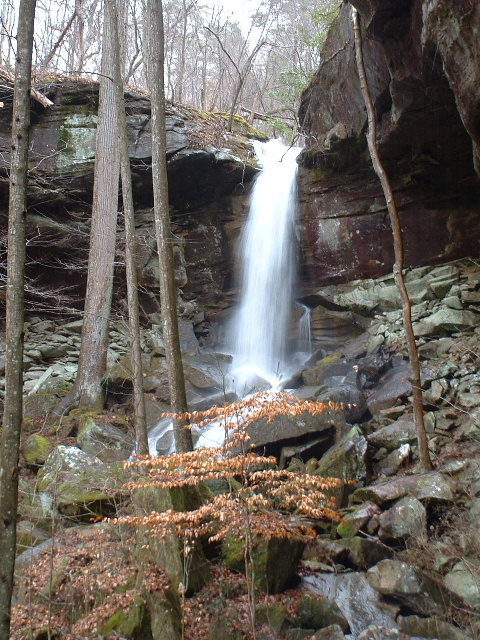
West Bee Falls

The wilderness consists of the low plateau of Brindlee Mountain which is dissected into a rough landscape by several creeks and rivers. Due to the layers of limestone and sandstone that make up the area, waterfalls are very common in the wilderness. This feature has earned the wilderness the nickname "Land of 1000 Waterfalls".

The wilderness is in the Appalachian mixed mesophytic forests ecoregion. Much of the wilderness was once logged, but new growth forests have now taken hold in the logged areas. Some old-growth forests can also be found in the wilderness. The most significant are about 260 acres (110 ha) along Bee Branch Gorge and Buck Rough Canyon, which include old Eastern Hemlock, American Beech, Sweet Birch, White Oak, and Tulip Poplar.

The Sipsey Wilderness Hiking Club promotes hiking in the Sipsey Wilderness.

A December 2024 article published by Garden & Gun explained its origins. "The sandstone canyon walls and boulders that litter the landscape and creek bottoms of the Sipsey are estimated to be between 250 and 550 million years old and likely formed during a heightened period of tectonic activity that occurred in the Appalachian orogeny," wrote Jim Beaugez. "Distinct geological formations like Ship Rock and the Eye of the Needle—created where parts of the canyon walls have crumbled over the epochs—now provide landmarks and shelter for hikers, climbers, and campers."

== History of creation ==
Faults in the 1964 Wilderness Act made it essentially impossible to designate a wilderness area anywhere east of the Mississippi River. Mary Ivy Burks of Birmingham worked to establish a Sipsey Wilderness Area in the Bankhead National Forest at a time when some believed that "The Wilderness Act" should apply only to the western part of the United States. She was in the forefront of what became known as the Eastern Wilderness Movement. Her work to secure the Sipsey Wilderness in the Bankhead National Forest was her crowning achievement. John Randolph and Mike Leonard led the effort to expand the wilderness in a second phase during the 1980s. Alabama would be the agent of change, as a strange union of environmentalists, loggers, bird watchers, and others joined together to push to change the Act to allow for the designation of Sipsey as a wilderness area. Thanks to a bill introduced by Senator John Sparkman, the Eastern Wilderness Areas Act of 1975, the wilderness was finally designated with an original size of 12,000 acres (4,900 ha). The wilderness would be expanded in 1988. Thanks to the changes made to the Act, dozens of wilderness areas have been designated across the United States. The Sipsey Wilderness helped to show that a smaller plot of restored land in the eastern US could be a wilderness just as much as a larger tract of virgin land in the west.

== Official trailheads ==
- Sipsey River Picnic Area
- Randolph Trailhead
- Thompson Trailhead
- Borden Creek Trailhead
- Braziel Creek Trailhead
- Gum Pond Trailhead
- Flannigin Trailhead

A map of trails is available from the US Forest Service.

== Official trails ==
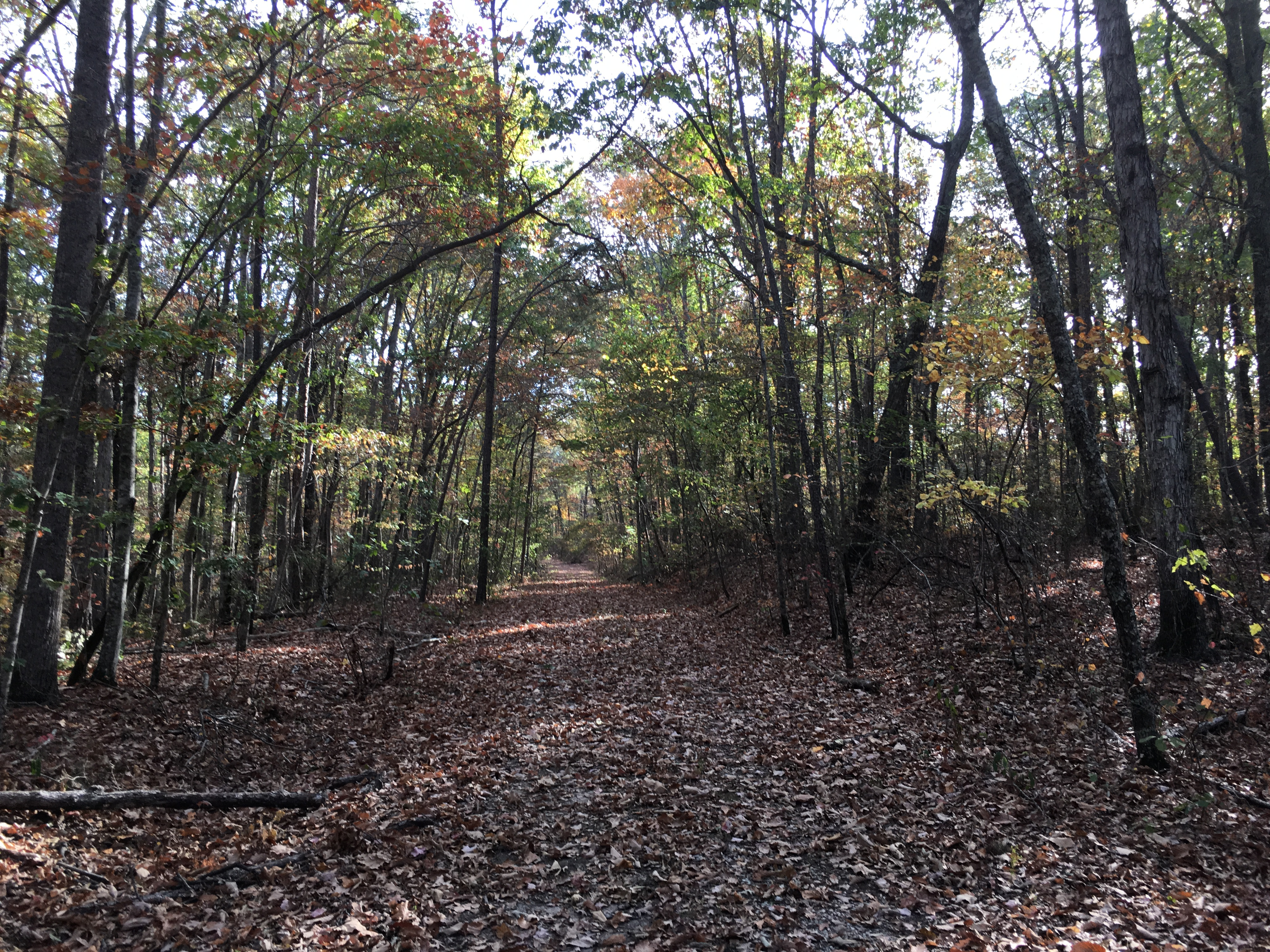
Trail 202

- FT 200: Borden Creek Trail, 2.7 mi (4.3 km).
- FT 201: Rippey Trail, 2.6 mi (4.2 km).
- FT 202: Randolph Trail, 3.4 mi (5.5 km).
- FT 203: Lookout Trail, 4.3 mi (6.9 km).
- FT 204: Bee Ridge Trail, 2.7 mi (4.3 km).
- FT 206: Thompson Creek Trail, 3.7 mi (6.0 km).
- FT 207: Braziel Creek Trail, 4.6 mi (7.4 km).
- FT 208: Northwest Trail, 7.0 mi (11.3 km).
- FT 209: Sipsey River Trail, 6.7 mi (10.8 km).
- FT 210: Mitchell Ridge Trail, 7.3 mi (11.7 km).
- FT 223: Gum Pond Trail, 1.8 mi (2.9 km).
- FT 224: Bunyan Hill Trail, 4.8 mi (7.7 km).

Trail maps are available from the U.S. Forest Service, and from Briartech.

During the 2011 Super Outbreak of tornadoes, there was extensive damage to much of the north Sipsey area. It was not considered feasible to fully repair the trail system at the time and efforts were focused on more popular routes. Several badly damaged trails were considered "abandoned" indefinitely, pending the resources to clear them. There is a notice to this effect placarded at the main Sipsey Trailhead, however this notice is not always present at outlying trailheads.

It appears that more recently (beginning in late 2013) some effort to clear and reroute the remainder of these trails has started taking place, although it is limited and trail reports continue to suggest difficulty hiking and following some less common trails. It is suggested that potential hikers find reliable recent information while planning a hike.

== Places of interest ==
- Saltpeter Furnace: Located not far from the Bee Branches, a small cave is hidden by a waterfall, and that cave was once so important that a small skirmish was fought at the nearby Hubbard's cotton mill during the American Civil War. The cave is a source of saltpeter, a major ingredient in the manufacture of gunpowder.
- Sipsey River Picnic Area: Where Cranal Road crosses the Sipsey River, a day-use area has been constructed to allow for picnicking and to serve as a parking area for hiking in the area. A $3 per vehicle day use fee is charged.
