= Middle River (Alabama) =

Physical characteristics
- Source
  - location: Tensaw River east of Bucks, Alabama
  - coordinates: 31°01′15″N 87°57′01″W
- Mouth
  - location: Tensaw River near the General W.K. Wilson Jr. Bridge
  - coordinates: 30°55′22″N 87°54′49″W
- Length: 9.5 mi (15.3 km)

The Middle River is a distributary river in Baldwin County, Alabama, which forms part of the Mobile-Tensaw River Delta. It branches off from the Tensaw River at 31.021°N 87.950°W. From there it flows southward for approximately 9.5 miles (15.3 km) before rejoining the Tensaw at 30.923°N 87.913°W.

== See also ==
- List of Alabama rivers
