= Sepulga River =

Location
- Country: United States
- State: Alabama

Physical characteristics
- Source
  - coordinates: 31.59821°N 86.95331°W
  - elevation: 85 ft (26 m)
- Mouth
  - location: Conecuh River
  - coordinates: 31.18128°N 86.76385°W
- Length: 61.5 mi (99.0 km)

The Sepulga River is a 61.5-mile-long (99.0 km) river in the U.S. state of Alabama. It originates at the confluence of the East Sepulga and West Sepulga rivers and discharges into the Conecuh River near the northwestern border of Conecuh National Forest. The name Sepulga is possibly of either Creek or Choctaw origin. If Creek, it is possibly from asi meaning "yaupon" and algi meaning "grove". If Choctaw in origin, the name is possibly derived from shoboli, which means "smoky".
