= Culstigh Creek =

Stream in Alabama, United States

Coordinates: 34.379475°N 85.549971°W

Culstigh Creek is a stream in Cherokee County, Alabama, in the United States. It is a tributary of the Chattooga River.

Culstigh is a name derived from the Cherokee language meaning "honey locust place".

== See also ==
- List of rivers of Alabama
