= No Business Creek =

Stream in Morgan County, Alabama, U.S.

Coordinates: 34°27′44″N 86°59′11″W

No Business Creek is a stream located in Morgan County, Alabama. A tributary of Flint Creek, it runs near the town of Hartselle.
