= Big Juniper Creek =

Physical characteristics
- Source
  - location: near Belandville, Florida
- 2nd source: Sweetwater Creek
  - location: near Belandville, Florida
- Mouth: Blackwater River
  - location: 5 miles (8.0 km) upstream from Big Coldwater Creek
  - coordinates: 30°41′46″N 86°54′24″W
- Length: 21 miles (34 km)
- Basin size: 155 square miles (400 km^{2})
- Discharge
  - location: mouth
  - average: 260 cubic feet (7.4 m^{3}) per second

Basin features
- Tributaries
  - left: Sweerwater Creek
- Bridges: County Road 191, Florida State Road 4

Big Juniper Creek is a tributary of the Blackwater River primarily in Santa Rosa County, Florida. It rises in several small streams just north of the state line in Escambia County, Alabama, and flows southward to merge into the Blackwater River 5 miles (8.0 km) upstream from the mouth of Big Coldwater Creek. Baseflow makes up just over half of the flow in Big Juniper Creek, while the rest is surface runoff. The stream beds consist of sand and gravel.

== Sources ==
- Boning, Charles R. (2007). Florida's Rivers. Sarasota, Florida: Pineapple Press. ISBN 978-1-56164-400-1.
- Peters, William L.; Peters, Janice G. (1973). Proceedings of the First International Conference on Ephomeroptera, Florida Agricultural and Mechanical University, August 17-20, 1970. Brill Archive. ISBN 978-90-04-03590-4 – via Google Books.
- Musgrove, Rufus B.; Barraclough, Jack T.; Grantham, Rodney G. (1965). Water Resources of Escambia and Santa Roas Counties,Florida (PDF). Report of Investigations No, 40 (Report). Tallahassee, Florida: Florida Geological Survey – via University of Florida Libraries.
