= Duck River (Alabama) =

Location
- Country: United States
- State: Alabama
- County: Cullman

Physical characteristics
- Source
  - location: near Birdsong
  - coordinates: 34.24592°N 86.65213°W
- Mouth: Mulberry Fork
  - location: near Hanceville
  - coordinates: 34.08507°N 86.69824°W
- Length: 19 mi (31 km)

Basin features
- Progression: Mulberry Fork → Black Warrior → Mobile → Mobile Bay

Duck River is a 19-mile-long (31 km) river in Cullman County in the state of Alabama. It is a tributary of the Mulberry Fork of the Black Warrior River.
