= Dog River (Alabama) =

River in Mobile County, Alabama, United States

- Dog River looking toward the mouth of the river; the Dog River Bridge in the background

Location
- Country: United States
- State: Alabama
- County: Mobile County

Physical characteristics
- Source
  - coordinates: 30.64158°N 88.09666°W
- Mouth
  - coordinates: 30.56491°N 88.08833°W
- Length: 8 mi (13 km)
- Basin size: 90 mi^{2} (230 km^{2})

Dog River is a river in Mobile County, Alabama. The Dog River watershed drains more than 90 square miles (230 km^{2}). The river is about 8 miles (13 km) long and is influenced by tides. It originates at 30.64158°N 88.09666°W within the city of Mobile. It discharges into Mobile Bay, a tidal estuary on the northern Gulf of Mexico, at 30.56491°N 88.08833°W near Hollinger's Island. It was named by the original French colonists as the Riviere Au Chien, which can be translated into English as Dog River.

Dog River is a brackish river - a mixture of fresh and saltwater. Also known to be a shallow river with the average depth at around 9–12 feet deep with some areas along the wetlands being only 1–2 feet at mid-tide. There are both fresh and salt water fish species including bass, bream, mullet, redfish, croakers, speckled trout and flounder. Most land connected to the river is privately owned however there are several parks and public boat launch areas. Boaters can refuel at the marinas located at the river's mouth.

Dog River near Navco Park a rolling fog bank.

Halls Mill Creek.

Halls Mill Creek after a heavy rain.

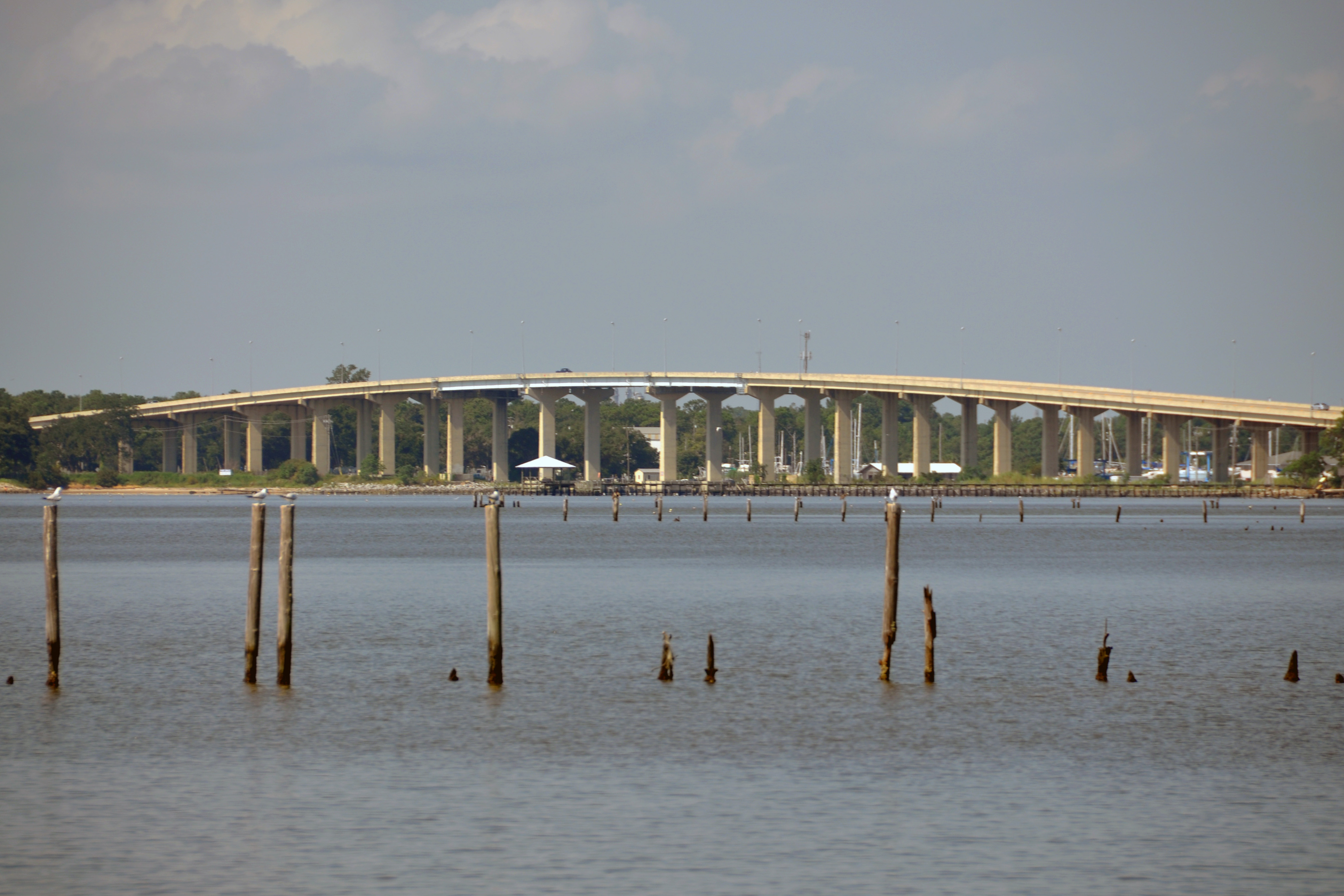
Dog River Bridge.

Major tributaries and sub-basins of the watershed include:

- Alligator Bayou
- Bolton Branch
- Eslava Creek
- Halls Mills Creek
- Montlimar Canal
- Moore Creek
- Pearch Creek
- Rabbit Creek
- Rattlesnake Bayou
- Robinson Bayou

== See also ==
- List of Alabama rivers
