= East Fork Little River =

Location
- Country: United States
- State: Alabama, Georgia

Physical characteristics
- Source
  - coordinates: 34.56813°N 85.45607°W
- Mouth
  - coordinates: 34.39771°N 85.62718°W

East Fork Little River is a 17.0-mile-long (27.4 km) river in the U.S. states of Alabama and Georgia. It originates near LaFayette, Georgia and discharges into the Little River near Fort Payne, Alabama.
