= Apalachee River (Alabama) =

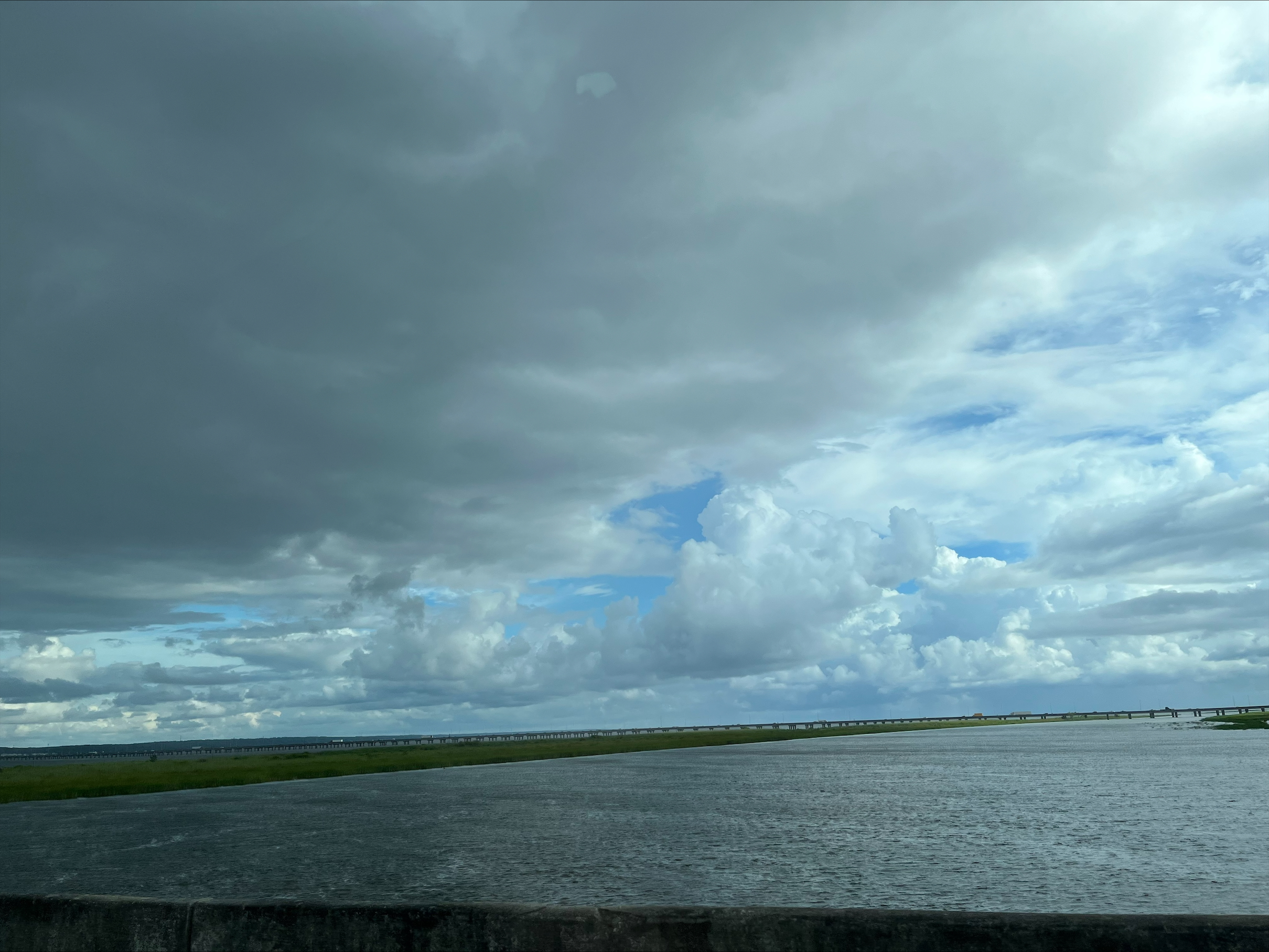
- Apalachee River from U.S. Route 98 in Baldwin County, Alabama

Physical characteristics
- Source
  - coordinates: 30.74333°N 87.93194°W
- Mouth
  - coordinates: 30.66074°N 87.95860°W
- Length: 6 mi (9.7 km)

The Apalachee River is a distributary river in Baldwin County, Alabama that forms part of the Mobile-Tensaw River Delta. It branches off from the Tensaw River at 30.74333°N 87.93194°W. From there it flows southward for approximately 6 miles (9.7 km) before emptying into Mobile Bay at 30.66074°N 87.95860°W. Apalachee comes from the Hitchiti word apalahchi, which means "on the other side".

== See also ==
- List of Alabama rivers
