= Bassett Creek (Crystal, Minnesota) =

Place in Minnesota, United States

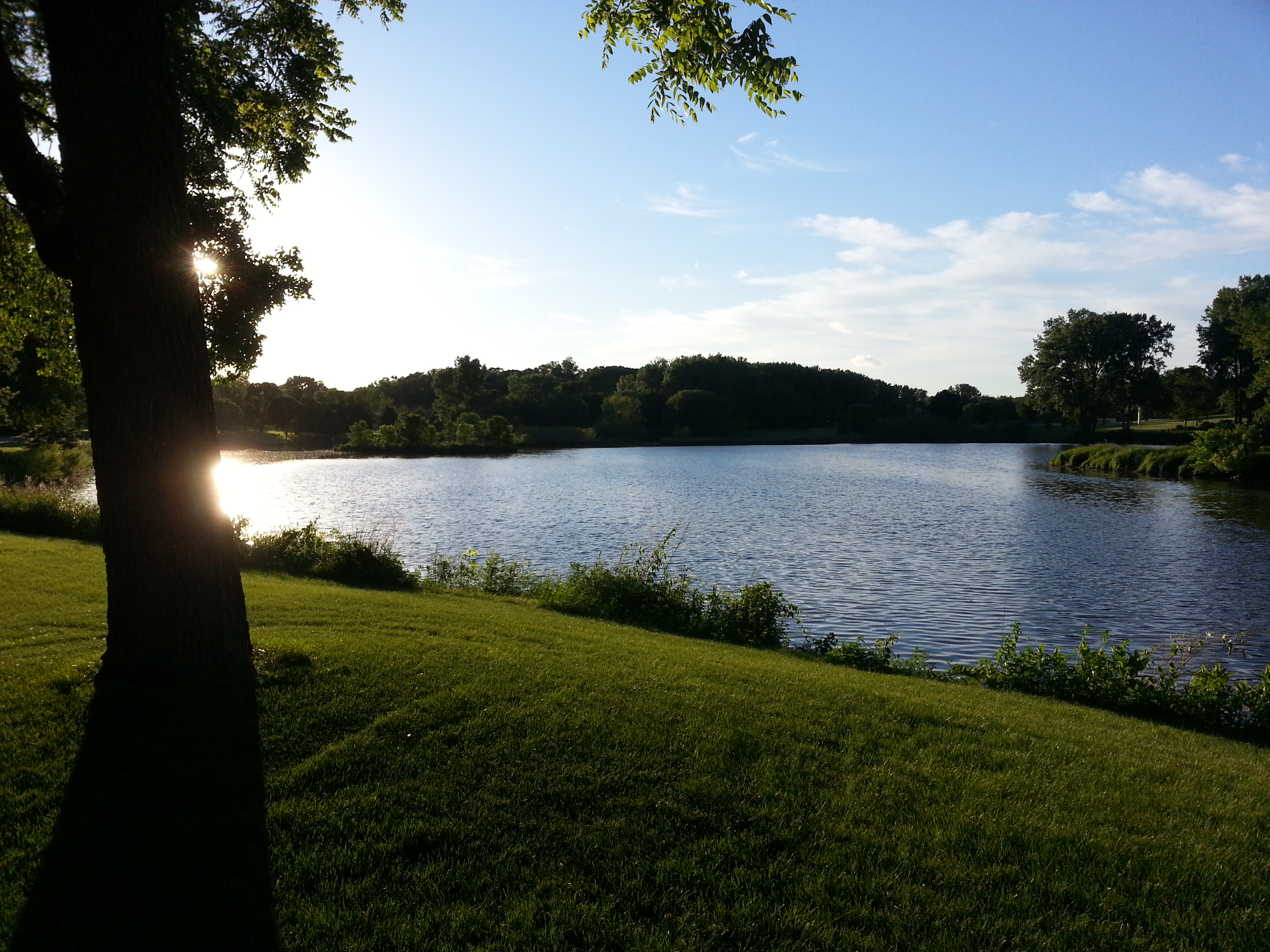
- View overlooking Bassett Creek Park in Crystal, MN
- Interactive map of Bassett Creek
- Coordinates: 45.013846°N 93.353763°W
- Country: United States
- State: Minnesota
- County: Hennepin
- City: Crystal
- Time zone: UTC-6 (CST)
  - Summer (DST): UTC-5 (CDT)
- ZIP code: 55422
- Area code: 763

Bassett Creek is a neighborhood within the city of Crystal, Minnesota. It is named for Bassett Creek, which flows through the southern portion of the neighborhood.

It borders the city of Minneapolis to the south and east, and is generally considered to be the section of Crystal that is situated east of Douglas Drive, south of 36th Ave. N., and west of Highway 100. Bassett Creek is bordered by Crystal neighborhoods Lee Park to the east, Valley Place to the west, and Fair to the north.

The neighborhood is the location for Bassett Creek Park, the largest park in Crystal. The park has a 3,700 sq. ft. playground, a baseball field, softball field, hockey rink, four volleyball courts, three tennis courts, 12 holes of disc golf and 1.06 miles of asphalt trails. In 2024, the Second Annual Ȟaȟá Wakpádaŋ Water Blessing was hosted at the park. A neighborhood association has been formed to assist in the upkeep of the park facilities.

The neighborhood is also part of the Bassett Creek Watershed, and is the location of the Bassett Park Pond sub-watershed. The watershed is overseen by the Bassett Creek Watershed Management Commission.
