= Bodka Creek =

Stream in Alabama and Mississippi, U.S.

Coordinates: 32°45′43″N 88°22′31″W

Bodka Creek is a stream in the U.S. states of Alabama and Mississippi.

Bodka Creek is a name derived from the Choctaw language meaning "wide creeks", a reference to its many branches. Variant names are "Bodca Creek", "Bodea Creek", and "Bodkars Creek".
