= South Sauty Creek =

Location
- Country: United States
- State: Alabama
- Region: DeKalb County, Jackson County, Marshall County

Physical characteristics
- Source
  - location: near Henagar in DeKalb County, Alabama, United States
  - coordinates: 34°38′11″N 085°43′31″W
  - elevation: 1,600 ft (490 m)
- Mouth: Guntersville Lake of the Tennessee River
  - location: near Langston, Alabama in Jackson County, Alabama, United States
  - coordinates: 34°32′35″N 086°07′17″W
  - elevation: 594 ft (181 m)
- Length: 32.25 mi (51.90 km)
- Basin size: 125.8 mi^{2} (326 km^{2})
- Discharge
  - location: Rainsville, Alabama
  - average: 81 cu/ft. per sec.
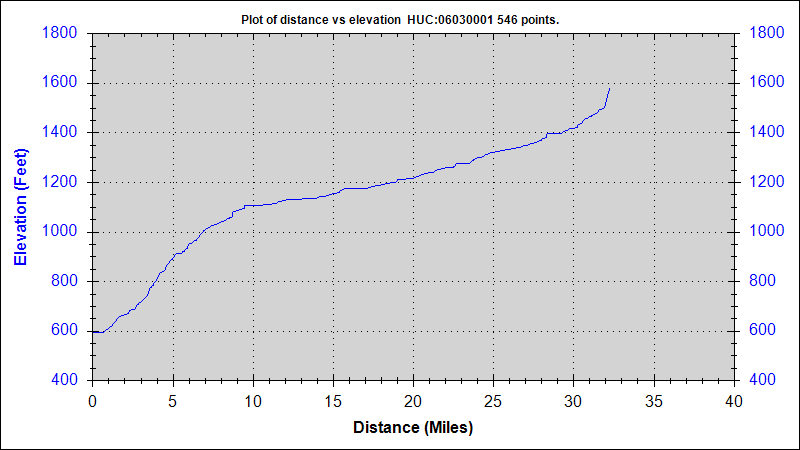
- Elevation Profile vs River Length

South Sauty Creek is 32.25 miles (51.90 km) long with a drainage area of 125.8 square miles (326 km^{2}), and is a tributary to the Tennessee River. The river rises in DeKalb County, Alabama, and flows generally southwest along Sand Mountain from its headwaters before turning generally west and flowing off of Sand Mountain, through Buck's Pocket, terminating shortly afterwards into Lake Guntersville in an area known as Morgan's Cove. South Sauty forms the Buck's Pocket canyon as the creek falls from the north side of Sand Mountain (Alabama).
