= Kinterbish Creek =

Stream in Alabama and Mississippi, U.S.

Coordinates: 32°16′05″N 88°01′07″W

Kinterbish Creek is a stream in the U.S. states of Alabama and Mississippi. It is a tributary to the Tombigbee River.

Kinterbish is a name derived from the Choctaw language purported to mean "beaver dam". Variant names are "Abeshai Creek", "Big Kinterbish Creek", "Kintabish Creek", "Kintabush Creek".
