= Mulberry Creek (Tennessee River tributary) =

Coordinates: 34°46′39″N 87°53′30″W

Mulberry Creek

Mulberry Creek is a short tributary of the Tennessee River in Colbert County in northern Alabama in the United States. The stream enters the Pickwick Lake portion of the Tennessee River from the southwest. The confluence is three miles east of Cherokee and the stream crosses US Route 72 about 2 miles (3.2 km) west of Barton.
