= Catoma Creek Site =

The Catoma Creek site (1MT209) in Alabama is near the Alabama River's main tributary stream. The creek was named due to its proximity to the Catoma Creek within its floodplain. Its existence is marked by the Middle Woodland period, which occurred in Alabama from 200 CE - 500 CE. Catoma Creek is considered to be one of Cobb City's "Swamp Sites," which occupy the surrounding areas of the upper river valley in Alabama. These sites have collectively served as channels for the culture and lifestyle of the neighbouring communities. At the Cobb's Swamp sites, the Catoma Creek site has received the most in-depth examination. Excavations of Catoma Creek Site have uncovered a considerable number of remains, including artefacts and structures that provide insight into the culture and daily life of residing communities.

== Site record ==
During the Middle Woodland period, the channel had no meanders. Since then, flooding on the site has significantly decreased, exposing channel meanders and artifacts and allowing for intensive excavation. During the latter half of 1960, David Chase became the first person to distinguish the Cobb's Swamp by site type and as a collection. He claimed, based on the high concentration of artefacts and deposits from middens throughout the site, there was more considerable settling here in comparison to other Cobb's Swamp sites. However, these data could be slightly augmented, as the sites have gone through extensive transformation and weathering over time. Many artefacts and remains may still be undiscovered. Chase began an investigation into the site in 1975, opening with a Phase I survey.

== Excavation history ==
Excavations of 1MT209 consisted of 34 units in all. One excavation project, occurred between June and September 2006, involved the examination of four blocks (A, B, C, and D) with B and C containing the most considerable amount of artefacts and features. During the excavations, 32 features were uncovered, revealing remnants that exemplified how societies lived during that period. Much of the pottery uncovered can be distinguished from other regions by the Peach State Archaeological Society, which were applied on vessels from Cobb's Swamp sites and local sites, like Cartersville. Some of these remnants included but were not limited to, a midden containing house remains such as floors and kitchen features, a hearth indicating a common area, and artefacts with pottery and rock assemblage. These were part of the most significant discovery.

Discovering the structural remains also provided a better understanding of the type of construction seen around the site, including pit-houses and dome-shaped homes with a communal area, usually containing a hearth.

== Artifact recovery ==
=== Features ===
The features of the recovered artefacts have provided insights into the lifestyle tendencies and practices of the Middle Woodland people. They were thought to be semi-sedentary, implying they had lived nomadic lives for part of the year and remained sedentary for the other part. Fifty-three features from the site were grouped into 7 divisions based on the characteristics and the components they shared.

==== Groups 1–7 ====
The first group consists of stone or rock-based features that were associated with heating, including hearths, ovens, and fire basins. In addition to sharing function, these features also shared morphological characteristics such as being round or bowl-shaped. Rock clusters among the features in group 1 are thought to be a result of hearth cleaning.

The second group contained post moulds, which suggests some type of hole creation that could have been a result of natural or man-made sources. This specific group of post moulds, however, does not have any indicators of being formed by nature. The shapes of the moulds and attributes of the stains were too deliberate to be natural.

The features in the third group were categorized based on their function as pits. They were all relatively similar in shape, although one was bell-shaped. They are thought to have been storage containers for small foods until they were no longer useful and were repurposed as rubbish pits. Some of the smaller pits could have shared a similar function as the features in group 1, like hearths or fire pits because they were deeper and involved more midden waste indicating heat-related functions.

Group 4 consisted of more a miscellaneous array of artifacts, including 'pot busts', which are spots containing 'busted' or scrapped vessels. As a result, this group does not share many characteristics since the artefacts lack any identifiable attributes.

Group 5 mainly contained artefacts from middens, where deposits differing in some physical characteristics were collected.

Groups 6 and 7 included features that had effects from natural sources like wild animal disturbance.

== Significance ==
The excavations carried out at 1MT209 has brought to light a significant amount of knowledge and insight into the architecture, lifestyle, and customs of the people living during the Middle Woodland era.

From the structural and artifactual remains collected at the site, it can be concluded that the inhabitants of the area followed self-sustainable and moderately nomadic lifestyles. Agriculture played a vital role in their sustenance, although it was limited. They followed a diet predominantly dependent upon game hunting of deer, foraging for seafood, and natural crops, like nuts. Towards the end of the phase is when they were thought to have adopted other agricultural practices, namely horticulture. Communities in Cobbs Swamp sites practised extension of their society, mainly the exchange of cultural traditions and philosophies, informative material, and recreational activities such as pottery making.

There are very few sites that had the same characteristics as those found in Cobbs Swamp sites. These excavations brought about a considerable number of findings in addition to having the most comprehensive investigation of the Cobbs Swamp sites.
