= Mud Creek (Tennessee River tributary) =

Stream in Tennessee, U.S.

Coordinates: 35.2159148°N 88.2808713°W

Mud Creek is a stream in the U.S. state of Tennessee. It is a tributary to the Tennessee River.

Mud Creek was descriptively named.
