= Horse Creek (Tombigbee River tributary) =

Location
- Country: United States
- State: Alabama

Physical characteristics
- Source
  - location: Clarke County
  - coordinates: 31.93626°N 87.75861°W
- Mouth
  - location: Marengo County, Tombigbee River
  - coordinates: 32.07709°N 88.05418°W
  - elevation: 33 ft (10 m)
- Basin size: 60.4 mi^{2} (156 km^{2})
- Discharge
  - average: 28,100 cu ft/s (800 m^{3}/s)

Horse Creek is a stream and tributary of the Tombigbee River in southern Marengo County and northern Clarke County in Alabama.

== Location and characteristics ==
Horse Creek originates near the Choctaw Corner in Clarke County, at coordinates of 31.93626°N 87.75861°W, and discharges into the Tombigbee River near Putnam in Marengo County, at coordinates of 32.07709°N 88.05418°W. It has a watershed of 60.4 square miles (156 km^{2}) and a discharge of 28,100 cubic feet (800 m^{3}) per second.

== Prehistoric period ==
Archaeological work during the 1980s indicated that Horse Creek may mark the southern boundary for the Miller 1 phase of the Miller culture. Prior to this work, the boundary was thought by scholars to lie 15 miles (24 km) north, near Breckenridge landing.

A truncated pyramidal platform mound near the mouth of the creek was briefly investigated by archeologist Clarence Bloomfield Moore on March 5, 1905, during his expedition around the Southern United States aboard his steamboat, the Gopher. Moore thought the mound to be domiciliary, as it was unlike the small rounded burial mounds that are typical of the area. Due to the scarcity of Mississippian sites in the lower Tombigbee River Valley, Moore tentatively dated it to the Woodland period.
