= Blackwater River (Perdido River tributary) =

Location
- Country: United States
- State: Alabama
- County: Baldwin County

Physical characteristics
- Source
  - coordinates: 30.63991°N 87.70221°W
- Mouth: Perdido River
  - coordinates: 30.48241°N 87.43525°W
- Length: 30.3 mi (48.8 km)

Blackwater River is a 30.3-mile-long (48.8 km) river in Baldwin County, Alabama. The Blackwater River originates at 30.63991°N 87.70221°W near Loxley, and discharges into the Perdido River at 30.48241°N 87.43525°W near Lillian.
