= Mulberry Creek (Alabama River tributary) =

Location
- Country: United States
- State: Alabama

Physical characteristics
- Source
  - location: Chilton County
  - coordinates: 32°52′9″N 86°47′24″W
- Mouth
  - location: Alabama River
  - coordinates: 32°26′21″N 86°51′30″W

Mulberry Creek is a 45.4-mile-long (73.1 km) waterway in central Alabama, United States. It rises in Chilton County and farther downstream forms the boundary between Dallas and Autauga counties. It is a tributary of the Alabama River.
