= Conecuh River =

River in Florida and Alabama, United States

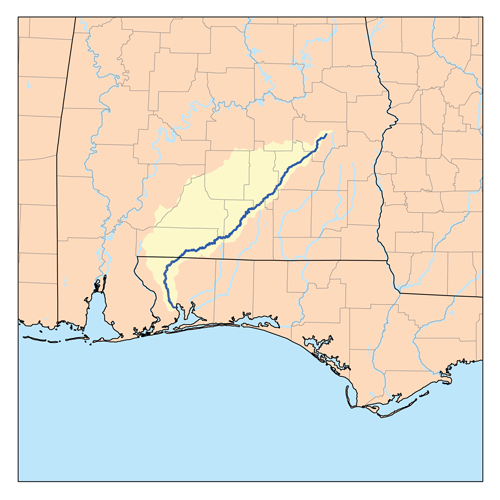

Location
- Country: United States
- Location: Pensacola, Florida, Brewton, Alabama, East Brewton, Alabama, Pollard, Alabama, Flomaton, Alabama, Riverview, Alabama

Physical characteristics
- Source
  - coordinates: 32.1371°N 85.6786°W
- Mouth
  - location: Gulf of Mexico
  - coordinates: 30.9966°N 87.1758°W
- Length: 258 mi (415 km)

The Conecuh River (upper portion) and Escambia River (lower portion) are a single 258-mile-long (415 km) river in the southern United States, which flows from Alabama through Florida into the Gulf of Mexico.

The Conecuh River rises near Union Springs, Alabama and flows 198 miles (319 km) in a general southwesterly direction into Florida near the town of Century. The Conecuh is dammed at two points in Covington County: at the Gantt Dam (6.57 miles north of Andalusia) and at the Point A Dam (4.23 miles northwest of Andalusia, inside the town limits of River Falls). The river's name changes from the Conecuh to the Escambia at the junction of Escambia Creek, 1.2 miles (1.9 km) downstream from the Florida-Alabama line. After this point, the Escambia River flows 60 miles (97 km) south to Escambia Bay, an arm of Pensacola Bay.

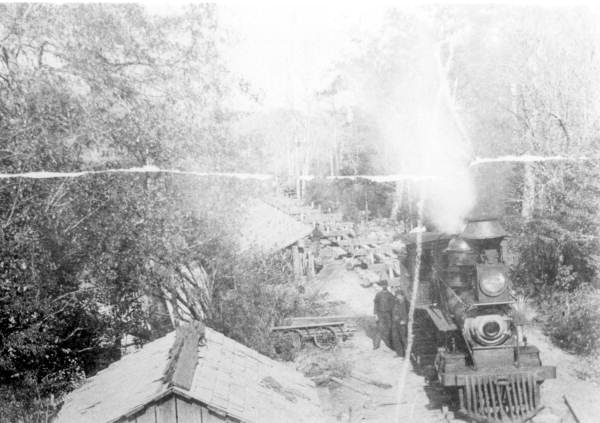
Train unloading logs into Escambia River in the 1890s

The river is dredged in the lower course.

== See also ==
- List of Alabama rivers
- List of Florida rivers
- South Atlantic–Gulf water resource region
