= Sipsey Creek (Tuscolameta Creek tributary) =

Stream in the U.S. state of Mississippi

Coordinates: 32.5370839°N 89.3889550°W

Sipsey Creek is a stream in the U.S. state of Mississippi. It is a tributary to Tuscolameta Creek.

Sipsey is a name derived from the Choctaw language meaning "poplar tree". A variant name is "Turkey Creek".
