= Tensaw River =

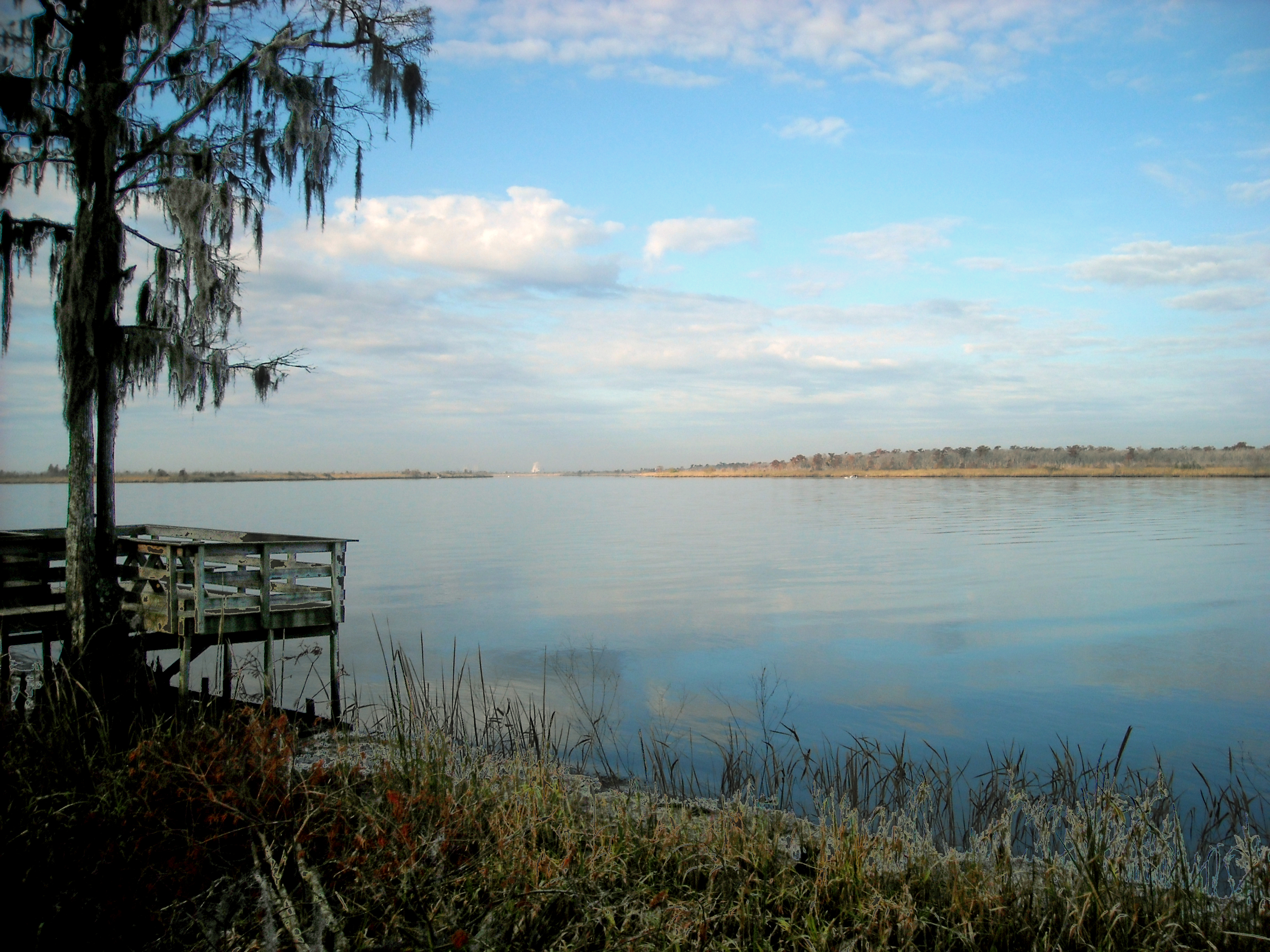
- The Tensaw River in Blakeley, Alabama

Location
- Country: United States
- State: Alabama
- County: Baldwin County

Physical characteristics
- Source
  - coordinates: 31.06795°N 87.96306°W
- Mouth
  - coordinates: 30.68519°N 88.00695°W
- Length: 41 mi (66 km)

The Tensaw River is a river in Baldwin County, Alabama. The name "Tensaw" is derived from the historic indigenous Taensa people.

== Overview ==
It is a distributary of the Mobile River, about 41 miles (66 km) long. It is formed as a bayou of the Mobile roughly 6 mi (9.7 km) south of the formation of the Mobile by the confluence of the Tombigbee and Alabama rivers, at 31.06795°N 87.96306°W.

The Tensaw flows alongside the Mobile and Middle Rivers, with the Tensaw being the easternmost flowing river. Numerous back channels extend off the main channel into Baldwin County. It enters Mobile Bay at 30.68519°N 88.00695°W, near Blakeley and Pinto Islands and around 1.8 mi (2.9 km) east of downtown Mobile.

== See also ==
- Mobile-Tensaw River Delta
- List of Alabama rivers
