= Mobile–Tensaw River Delta =

Large river delta system located in Alabama, USA

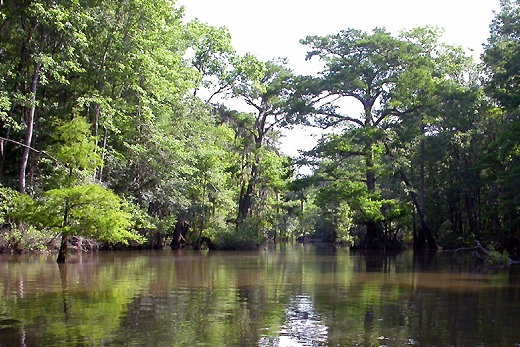
- Bottle Creek in the Mobile–Tensaw River Delta
- Interactive map of Mobile–Tensaw River Delta
- Location: Alabama
- Coordinates: 30°45′15″N 87°56′32″W
- Area: 260,000 acres (110,000 ha)

U.S. National Natural Landmark
- Designated: May 1974

The Mobile–Tensaw River Delta is the largest river delta and wetland in Alabama. It encompasses about 260,000 acres (110,000 ha) in a 40-by-10-mile (64 km × 16 km) area and is the second-largest delta in the contiguous United States. This large river delta is around 45 mi long and averages 8 mi wide, being 16 mi wide at its widest point. It covers roughly 300 sq mi. Of its 260,000 acres, 20,000 acres consist of open water, 10,000 acres are marsh, 70,000 acres are swamp; and more than 85,000 acres are bottomland forest. It drains an area of about 44,000 sq miles, which includes 64% of Alabama and small portions of Georgia and Mississippi.

The delta's northernmost point is the confluence of the Tombigbee and Alabama Rivers and follows a southerly direction that ultimately opens into the head of Mobile Bay through the Mobile, Tensaw, Apalachee, Middle, Blakeley, and Spanish Rivers near the Battleship Parkway. It is contained within sections of Baldwin, Clarke, Mobile, Monroe, and Washington Counties.

== Environment and ecology ==
The Mobile–Tensaw delta is ecologically important and includes a wide variety of habitats, including mesic flood plains, cypress-gum swamps, tidal brackish water marshes and forests, bottomland forests, and submersed grass beds. As one of the most biologically diverse regions in both Alabama and the United States, it is home to 126 fish, 46 mammal, 69 reptile, 30 amphibian, and at least 300 bird species, including more than 110 of which nest in the region. The delta's considerable biodiversity has led to it being described as an "American Amazon" by naturalist E. O. Wilson. Margaret Renkl has written about the delta and its vulnerability to coal ash pollution from the James M. Barry Electric Generating Plant upstream along the Mobile River.

== Natural history ==
The delta lies in a river valley that began forming several million years ago. Many separate inland streams joined as they flowed southward across land, which was once covered by the Gulf of Mexico. By the end of the last major ice age (around 18,000 years ago), when the sea level was much lower and Alabama's coastline was about 60 mi (97 km) south of its present location, the waterways of the delta valley extended much farther than their current-day southern termination at the head of Mobile Bay. As the ice age ended and global temperatures increased, sea levels began to rise again to their present-day level.

== History ==
Humans inhabited the delta region at least as far back as 5,000 years ago. During the Mississippian period, people of the Pensacola culture built earthen mounds along Bottle Creek and the Tensaw River. During the late prehistoric period, other peoples moved into the area, including the Taensas (Tensaw), the Creek, and the Choctaw. In the 16th century, the area was visited by Spanish forces. French explorers arrived in the last years of the 17th century, eventually settling colonial Mobile in 1702 at Twenty-seven Mile Bluff on the Mobile River. During the Creek War, Red Stick Creeks attacked Fort Mims near the confluence of the Alabama and Tombigbee Rivers in August 1813, where they killed most of the mixed-blood Tensaw and Lower Town Creeks, intermarried whites, slaves, and nearly 275 militia.

The schooner Clotilda arrived in the delta on July 7, 1860, carrying 103 enslaved West Africans captured in Dahomey, and was scuttled to prevent being prosecuted under the Act Prohibiting Importation of Slaves. It was the last slave ship to enter the United States from the Atlantic slave trade. After the Emancipation Proclamation and the Thirteenth Amendment, many of the descendants of the Clotilda established the neighborhood of Africatown in Mobile.

The last important battle of the American Civil War took place at the fortified town of Blakeley, located on the edge of the delta.

A railroad line to connect Mobile to Montgomery, now part of the CSX system, opened across the delta in 1872. In the mid-1920s, the Causeway was built across the lowest part of the delta, connecting the western and eastern shores of Mobile Bay. Later, I-65 and I-10 were constructed to span different parts of the area.

An area of 190,000 acres of the delta was designated as a National Natural Landmark in 1974, and four sites within the delta are also listed on the National Register of Historic Places.

== Conservation issues ==
The Mobile–Tensaw River Delta and the adjacent Mobile estuary make up one of the largest wetland ecosystems in the United States, which is why protecting its wide range of biodiversity is a top priority for conservators.

According to the Forever Wild ranking system, the Mobile-Tensaw Delta is one of its top priorities for protection. The Alabama Department of Conservation and Natural Resources (ADCNR) Game and Fish Division has also listed the Mobile-Tensaw Delta as one of their highest priorities for inclusion into the state wildlife management area system. The delta is one of 327 watersheds (of the 2,100 in the United States) to be deemed as being of irreplaceable value to conserving populations of all freshwater fish and mussel species at risk.

Conservators' wide range of obstacles include hydrological alterations from man-made developments, stream pollution, the effects of upstream dams on stream flow, and effects of exotic invasive plant and animal species. The construction of the causeway in the 1920s is considered one of the most significant man-made obstructions to the delta. The causeway restricts sediment and water exchange with Mobile Bay resulting in an immensely higher sedimentation rate. The loss of hydrological connectivity between the delta and Mobile Bay reduced the salinity of the surrounding rivers and bay. Several species of fish, crustaceans, shellfish, and plant communities have been altered as a result of reduced salinity.

Human activities resulting in upstream pollution within the Mobile River Basin have profound impacts on the Mobile-Tensaw Delta. Such pollution can include sediments, trace elements, metals, and pesticides draining from the basin upstream. Trace elements detected in fish tissue collected from sites throughout the Mobile River Basin suggest that aluminum, boron, copper, iron, manganese, selenium, strontium, and zinc are the most prevalent trace elements in the water.

Upstream dams are put into place most commonly for the purposes of power generation, navigation, and flood control. Dams distort the natural hydrological flow by either physically restricting movement of wildlife or by creating large areas of inhospitable habitat. In both cases, populations are isolated, which can have detrimental effects on reproduction and natural migration. The Claiborne Lock and Dam, the largest dam upstream of the Mobile water basin, is located in Monroe County, Alabama.

Exotic invasive plant and animal species have permanently altered the Mobile–Tensaw River Delta's ecology. Both types pose a threat to the native populations of wildlife that call the Mobile Delta home. Some of the most common non-native invasive plant species to conquer the delta include Eurasian watermilfoil, hydrilla, water hyacinth, and common salvinia. The most common invasive invertebrates include the Amazonian apple snails, Asiatic clams, and subtropical water fleas. Invasive fishes include common carp and grass carp. The invasive species that poses the largest threat to the entire ecosystem is wild swine. They are detrimental to the entire Alabama ecosystem because they eat almost any type of plant or animal materials, including agricultural crops, food discarded by humans, carrion, small mammals, birds, turtles, snakes, and amphibians. Humans are considered the only significant threat to this invasive hog population, which is why they are one of the only hunted animals in the state that are not monitored by a season for hunting.

== Recreation ==
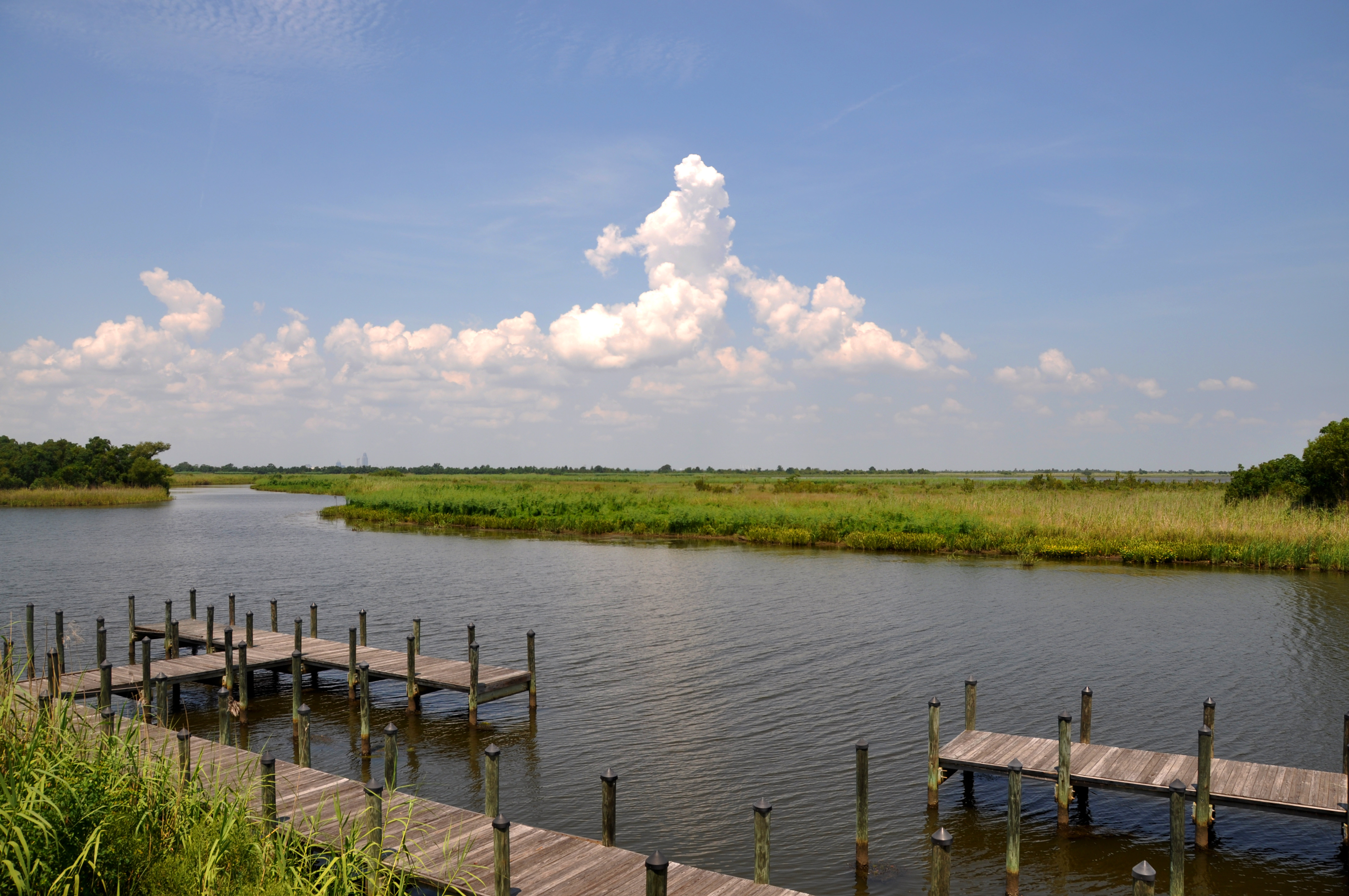
5 River Delta Resource Center

Boating and fishing are popular in the Mobile Delta. Boat ramps and water-access points are abundant throughout the area. The Bartram Canoe Trail provides a system of waterways by which boaters may explore the delta. The area is known for its excellent bird watching. Hunting is also a common pastime. Most of the Delta is very shallow water. To access these areas, airboats, canoes, kayaks, or other small craft are typically used.
