= Short Creek (Tennessee River tributary) =

River in Hardin and Wayne counties in Tennessee, United States

Coordinates: 35.401464°N 88.040308°W

Short Creek is a stream in the U.S. state of Tennessee. It is a tributary to the Tennessee River.

Short Creek was so named on account of its relatively short length.
