= Hurricane Creek (Black Warrior River tributary) =

Creek in western Alabama

Coordinates: 33.25233°N 87.46083°W

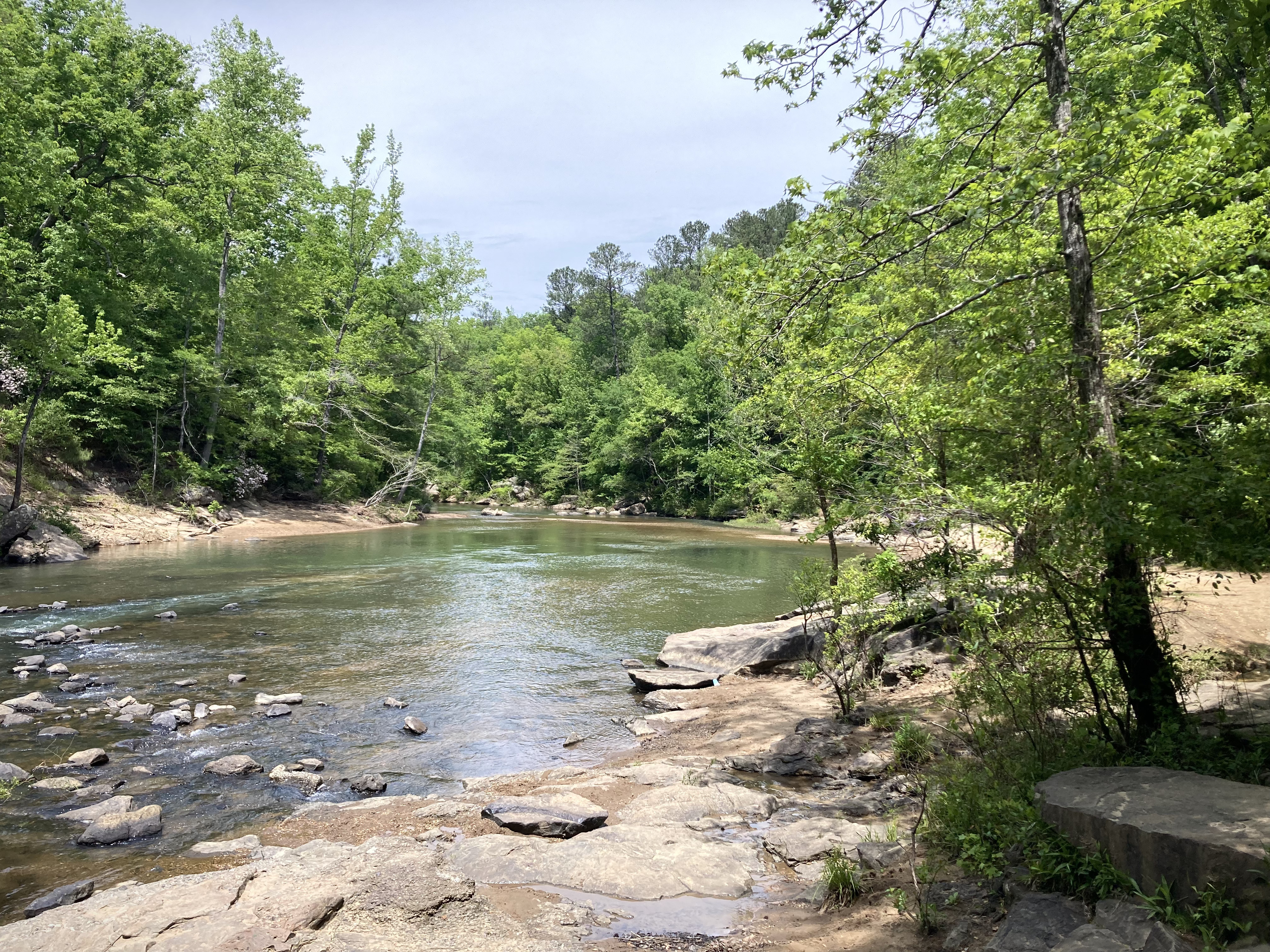
Shoals on Hurricane Creek

Hurricane Creek is a tributary of the Black Warrior River located in Southwestern Tuscaloosa County in western Alabama. It is over 30 miles long and its watershed covers approximately 120 square miles. It is used by communities around it, including the city of Tuscaloosa, for recreation and offers a wide variety of aquatic life and quality aesthetics. Three areas of this stream are on the federal 303(d) list of impaired streams, meaning they are protected by the Clean Water Act from further degradation. Current threats to water quality include active coal mining, abandoned mine lands, siltation, and some areas with high fecal coliform bacteria levels.

The origin of the name is obscure; it may recall a hurricane event, or be named after a settler called Harricane or Harrigan.
