= Blackwater River (Florida) =

River in Florida, United States

Blackwater River Cold Water River
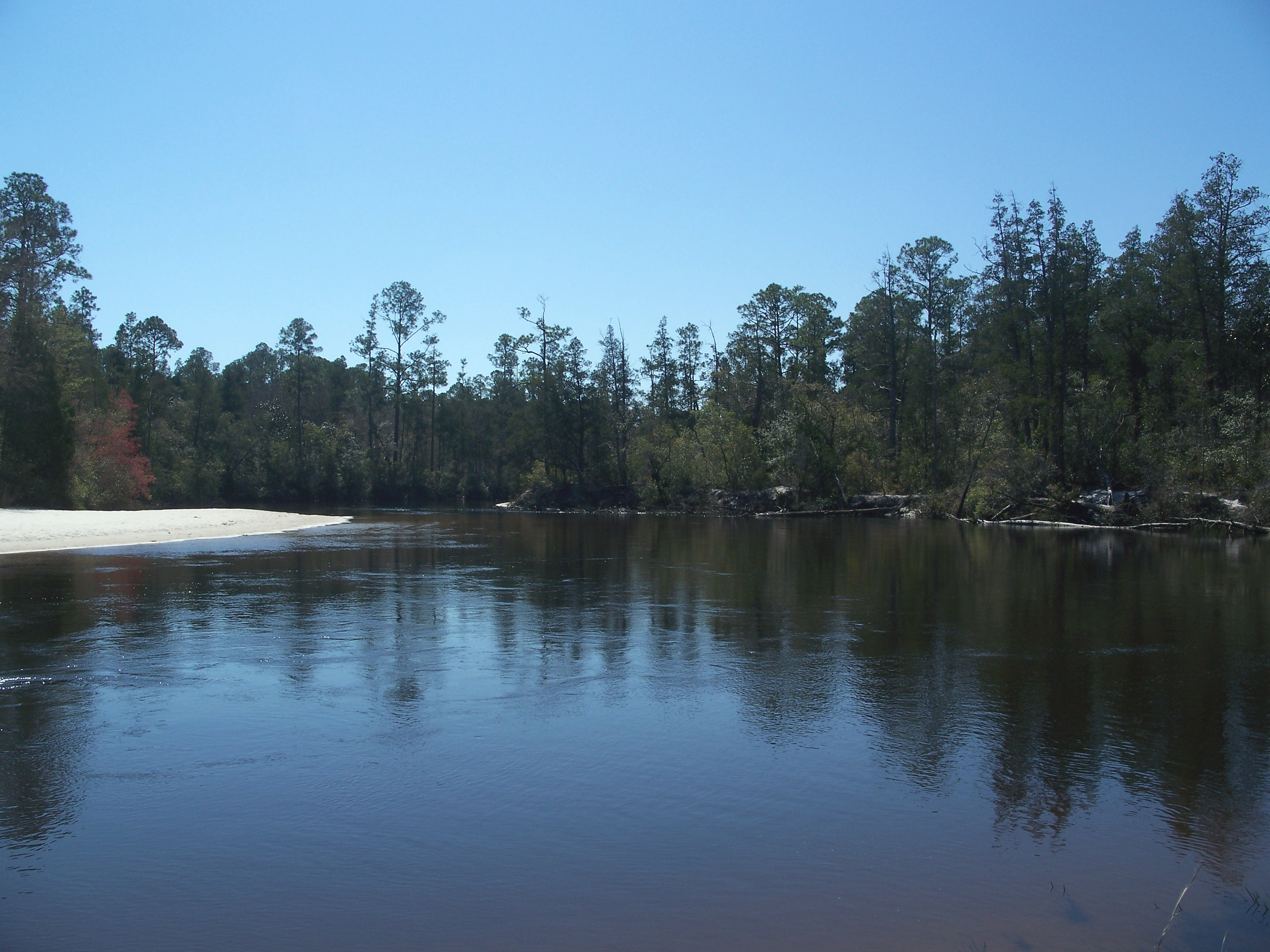
- Blackwater River in Blackwater River State Park

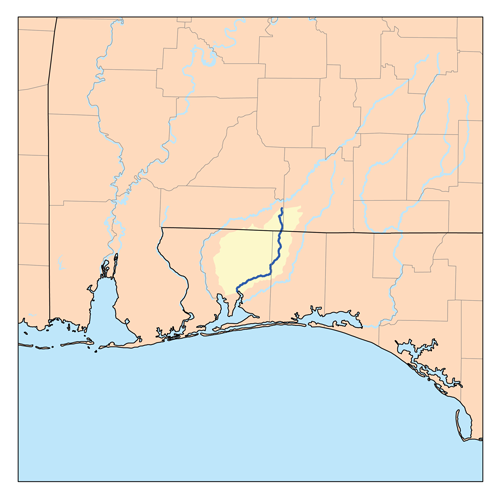
- Map of the course of the Blackwater River

Location
- Country: United States
- State: Florida and Alabama

Physical characteristics
- Source
  - location: Escambia County, Alabama
  - elevation: 127.95 ft (39.00 m)
- Mouth: Pensacola Bay
  - location: Santa Rosa County, Florida
  - coordinates: 30°34′26″N 87°00′04″W
  - elevation: 0 ft (0 m)
- Length: 56.6 miles (91.1 km)
- Basin size: 880 square miles (2,300 km^{2})

Basin features
- Tributaries
  - right: Big Coldwater Creek, Big Juniper Creek

The Blackwater River of Florida is a 56.6-mile-long (91.1 km) river rising in southern Alabama and flowing through the Florida Panhandle to the Gulf of Mexico. The river enters Florida in Okaloosa County and flows through Santa Rosa County to Blackwater Bay, an arm of Pensacola Bay. The river passes through Blackwater River State Forest and Blackwater River State Park. Milton, the county seat of Santa Rosa County, is located on the river.

The Blackwater's sandy bottom, white beaches and large sandbars contrast with the dark tannic water that gives the river its name. "Blackwater" is a translation of the Choctaw word oka-lusa, which means "water black".

31 miles (50 km) of the river are navigable by canoe, kayak or small boats. This section of the river, from Kennedy Bridge near Munson, Florida to Deaton Bridge in the Blackwater River State Park, is designated a Florida Canoe Trail – part of a statewide system of greenways and trails.

The river's average flow rate is 2 to 3 miles per hour (3.2 to 4.8 km/h), with an average depth of 2.5 feet (0.76 m). Depending on rainfall, water levels can fluctuate rapidly and low-lying areas are seasonally flooded by the river. This floodplain supports a wide variety of flora and fauna.

Aquatic plants include water fern, water lily, coontail, bladderwort and spatterdock. Oak, maple, sycamore, magnolia, holly, tupelo, mountain laurel and azaleas dominate the forest along the river and streams of the floodplain. Carnivorous plants such as parrot pitcher plants, white-top pitcher plants and sundews can also be found. Upland pine forests are mixed with turkey oak, sweetgum, flowering dogwood and persimmon. Open canopy forests combine several types of pine and dense groundcovers that include gallberry, saw palmetto, wild blueberry, wax myrtle and wiregrass. Atlantic white cedars line the river, and one of these was designated a Florida Champion in 1982, the largest of its species.

Wildlife found nearby include white-tailed deer, turkeys and bobcats. River otters are occasionally seen and alligators. A variety of birds, including red-headed and pileated woodpeckers, hawks, crows, warblers and Mississippi kites frequent the river area. Shorebirds such as plovers and sandpipers, as well as many types of heron and egret, can be found along the banks and sandbars.

The river has spawned many oxbow lakes, some of which can be seen from the river.

Two hurricanes in 1995, Erin and Opal, changed the course of the river downstream from Deaton Bridge in Blackwater River State Park. The section of the river between Deaton Bridge and Milton, Florida is no longer navigable by boat.

The navigable section of the river begins at Kennedy Bridge on State Forestry Road 24 (Kennedy Bridge Road) east of Munson, Florida. The next access point is 6 miles downstream at Peaden Bridge on State Forestry Road 50 (Peaden Bridge Road). Five more miles downstream, between Munson and Baker, Florida, is Cotton Bridge on State Road 4. Twelve more miles downstream is Bryant Bridge, on State Forestry Road 21 (Bryant Bridge Road) near Holt, Florida. The final access point, and the end of the Florida Canoe Trail, is eight more miles downstream at Deaton Bridge on State Forestry Road 23 in Blackwater River State Park.
