= Styx River (Alabama) =

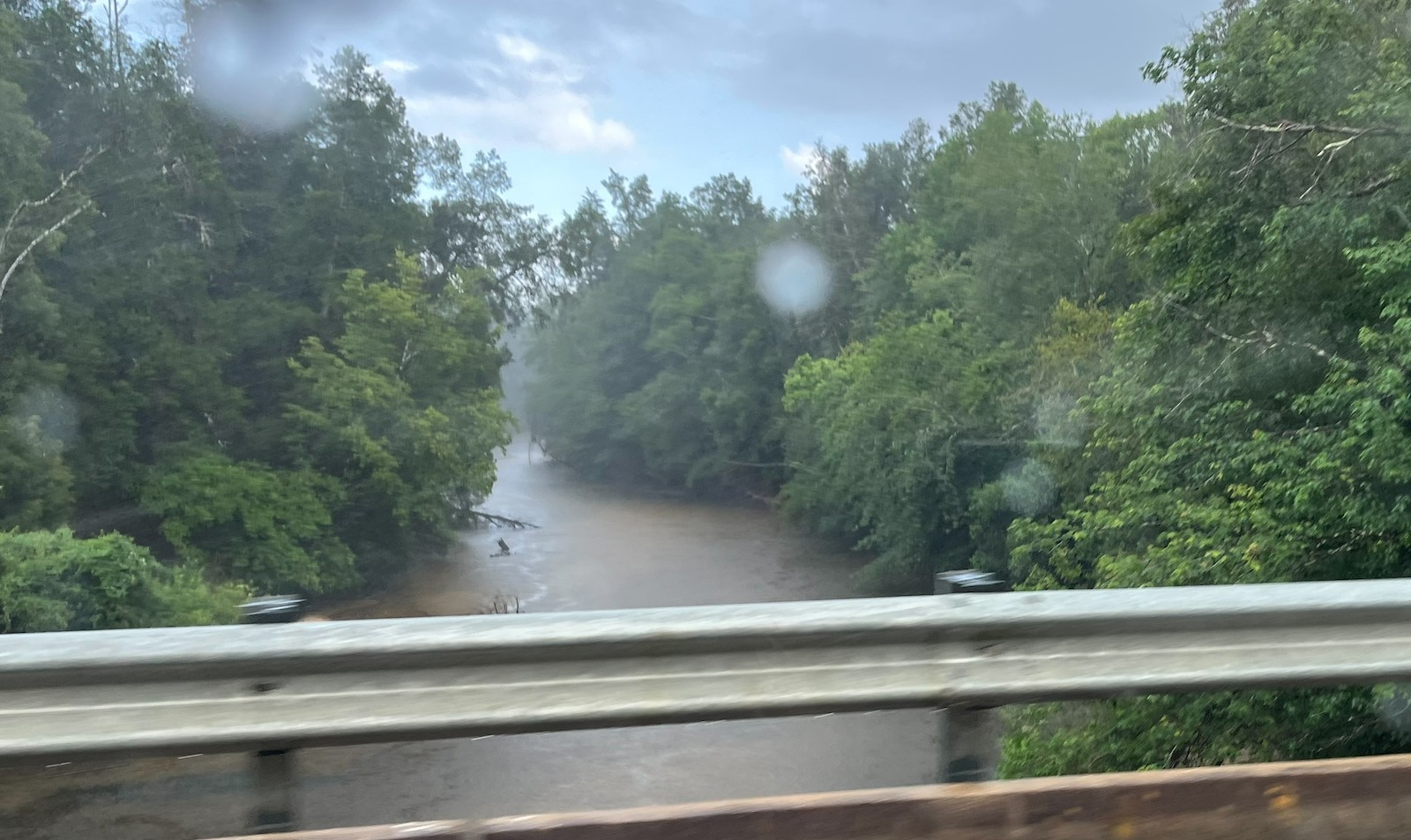
- Styx River near Gateswood, Alabama

Location
- Country: United States
- State: Alabama

Physical characteristics
- Source
  - coordinates: 30.86796°N 87.77443°W
- Mouth
  - coordinates: 30.51463°N 87.45025°W
- Length: 41.3 mi (66.5 km)

The Styx River is a 41.3-mile-long (66.5 km) river in the state of Alabama. It rises in Baldwin County near the town of Bay Minette in the southwestern part of the state and is a tributary to the Perdido River. It is named for the River Styx in Greek mythology. Where U.S. Highway 90 crosses the river by bridge, the attendant sign reads "Charon Retired".
