= Broglen River =

Physical characteristics
- Source
  - coordinates: 34.14482°N 86.76860°W
- Mouth
  - coordinates: 34.06204°N 86.69610°W

Broglen River is a 12.3-mile-long (19.8 km) river in Cullman County, Alabama. Broglen River originates at 34.14482°N 86.76860°W near Hanceville, and discharges into the Mulberry Fork River at 34.06204°N 86.69610°W near Chamblees Mill.
