= Little Choctawhatchee River =

Coordinates: 31°15′20.08″N 85°40′30.39″W

Location
- Country: United States
- State: Alabama

Physical characteristics
- Source
  - elevation: 115 ft (35 m)
- Mouth
  - location: Choctawhatchee River
- Length: 24 mi (39 km)
- Basin size: 261 mi^{2} (680 km^{2})

Little Choctawhatchee River is a 24.0-mile-long (38.6 km) river in Alabama, United States. It drains an area of 261 square miles (680 km^{2}) in Dale, Geneva, Henry and Houston counties. It empties into the Choctawhatchee River. Surveys of the river show it to be poor in invertebrates and high in pollutants.
