= Tuckabum Creek =

Stream in Mississippi, United States

Coordinates: 32.2616800°N 88.4533100°W

Tuckabum Creek is a stream in the U.S. states of Alabama and Mississippi.

Tuckabum is a name derived from the Choctaw language purported to mean either (sources vary) "first" or "stream bed", but the meaning can not be known with certainty. Variant names are "Tickabum Creek", "Tuckabunne Creek", "Tuckaburne Creek", and "Tuckalum Creek".
