= Hillabahatchee Creek =

Water stream

Coordinates: 33.33883°N 85.25895°W

Hillabahatchee Creek is a stream in the U.S. states of Alabama and Georgia. It is a tributary to the Chattahoochee River.

Hillabahatchee ("Hillabee Creek") derives its name from the Hillabee people.
