= Edsel Ford (poet) =

American poet

Edsel Ford (December 30, 1928 – February 19, 1970) was a poet who lived most of his life in Arkansas. He had the same name as Henry Ford's son.

== Early life ==
Ford was born on a farm in Eva, Alabama. According to one source, he was named after the doctor who delivered him; according to another, the doctor suggested the name to Ford's mother, who thought it would "in a wistful sort of way tie the two families together". In 1939 his family moved to near Avoca, Arkansas, where his father had a chicken farm. Edsel attended high school in Rogers, Arkansas.

== Career ==
He began writing early and published his first poem in the Kansas City Star at the age of 14. In 1948 he won a Poets Roundtable of Arkansas Award and matriculated at the University of Arkansas.

After receiving a degree in journalism in 1952, he was drafted and served in the Army in Hanau, Germany. During his service he refused officer training because he felt that no one should have that kind of authority over others. He also continued writing (contributing so many poems to the "Pup Tent Poets" column of Stars and Stripes that a reader wrote, "I am getting bored/ with the works of Edsel Ford"). After his enlistment ended, he worked for a few years in Texas and in Hobbs, New Mexico as a clerk for Phillips Petroleum.

In February 1957, he became a full-time writer, and a year later went back to his family's farm as writing was not producing enough income for him to live independently. His poems appeared in a wide variety of publications, among the best-known of which were the Saturday Review, The New York Times, The Christian Science Monitor, Ladies' Home Journal, and McCall's. He also reviewed books for the Tulsa World and wrote a column, "The Golden Country", for the Ozarks Mountaineer.

== Personal life and demise ==
In 1961 he met the artist Hank Spruce, who soon became his close friend and patron. Beginning in 1962 they shared a house in Fort Smith, Arkansas.

Ford died of a brain tumor at the age of 41.

== Poetry ==
As a high-school senior, Ford cited Shakespeare, Longfellow, and Millay as his favorite writers. Two strong influences were mentors from his college days, the Arkansas poet laureate Rosa Zagnoni Marinoni and the professor and antiquarian W. J. Lemke.

Ford's mature poetry was mostly in meter and rhyme. A student of his work has noted that his college poems were often about death; his Army poems, about the spiritual death that he saw as a soldier in occupied Germany. Many of his later subjects were drawn from rural Arkansas. His work often featured striking phrases such as "old corn-cribs/ Lean upon the muscle of the air."

== Awards and uses of his work ==
Ford received the 1966 Alice Fay di Castagnola Award of the Poetry Society of America for his work in progress A Landscape for Dante. He also received a Distinguished Alumni Citation from the University of Arkansas (1966) and the Devins Memorial Award, which included the publication of his volume Looking for Shiloh, by the University of Missouri Press.

Readers are now most likely to meet with Ford's poetry in two places. His sonnet "Return to Pea Ridge" was read when Pea Ridge National Military Park was dedicated and appears on a plaque there. Also, Vladimir Nabokov quoted two lines from Ford's sonnet "The Image of Desire" in the novel Pale Fire.

== Works ==
- Two Poets (in collaboration with Carl Selph, 1951)
- The Stallion's Nest (1952)
- This Was My War (Army poems, 1955)
- The Manchild from Sunday Creek (1956)
- One Leg Short from Climbing Hills (humorous writings for tourists, illustrated by his sister Imogene Hinesly, 1959)
- A Thicket of Sky (1961)
- Return to Pea Ridge (U. S. Civil War poems, 1963)
- Love Is the House It Lives In (1965)
- Looking for Shiloh (1968)
- Raspberries Run Deep (compilation, 1975)
