= Big Coldwater Creek =

Stream in Santa Rosa County, Florida

Physical characteristics
- Source: East Fork
  - location: near Sellersville, Florida
- 2nd source: West Fork
  - location: near Dixonville, Florida
- Mouth: Blackwater River
  - location: 3 miles (4.8 km) northeast of Milton, Florida
  - coordinates: 30°40′22″N 86°57′42″W
  - elevation: 3.6 feet (1.1 m)
- Length: 28 miles (45 km)
- Basin size: 238 square miles (620 km^{2})
- Discharge
  - location: mouth
  - average: 542 cubic feet (15.3 m^{3}) per second

Basin features
- Bridges: County Road 191, East Fork: Florida State Road 4, Old Steel Bridge, West Fork: Florida State Road 4, County Road 197, Florida State Road 87

Big Coldwater Creek (or Coldwater Creek) is a tributary of the Blackwater River in Santa Rosa County, Florida. It rises in several small streams in the northern part of the county near the border with Alabama, and flows southward to merge into the Blackwater River near the city of Milton, Florida.

Baseflow makes up about 60% of the flow in Big Coldwater Creek, while 40% is surface runoff. The basin has a rolling topography and a relatively (for Florida) steep slope, and flood waters drain quickly. Heaviest stream flow corresponds to seasonal variations in rainfall, with high average flows in March and April, high peak flows in July and August due to heavy rainstorms, and lowest average flows in October, during the dry season. Groundwater remains high enough to maintain stream flow year-round except in the smallest streams.

While some tributaries of the West Fork drain agricultural lands, most of the course of the stream runs through the Blackwater River State Forest. The stream is generally shallow, flowing over a sand bottom. Naval Air Station Whiting Field is 2 miles (3.2 km) west of the lower reach of Big Coldwater Creek, near Milton. The Coldwater Creek Canoe Trail extends for 18 miles (29 km) along the stream.

== Sources ==
- Boning, Charles R. (2007). Florida's Rivers. Sarasota, Florida: Pineapple Press. ISBN 978-1-56164-400-1.
- Peters, William L.; Peters, Janice G. (1973). Proceedings of the First International Conference on Ephomeroptera, Florida Agricultural and Mechanical University, August 17-20, 1970. Brill Archive. ISBN 978-90-04-03590-4 – via Google Books.
