= Bassett Creek (Tombigbee River tributary) =

Physical characteristics
- Source
  - location: Thomasville, Clarke County
  - coordinates: 31.91015°N 87.73583°W
- Mouth
  - location: near Jackson
  - coordinates: 31.46044°N 87.91527°W
  - elevation: 23 ft (7.0 m)
- Basin size: 188 sq mi (490 km^{2})

Basin features
- River system: Tombigbee River

Bassett Creek, also known as Bassett's Creek, East Bassetts Creek and Thichapataw, is a tributary of the Tombigbee River that flows through central Clarke County in Alabama.

Bassett Creek Church and a Small community is located there today.

== Location ==
Bassett Creek originates in Thomasville, at coordinates of 31.91015°N 87.73583°W, and discharges into the Tombigbee River south of Jackson, at coordinates of 31.46044°N 87.91527°W. The creek has a drainage area that covers 188 square miles (490 km^{2}).
