= Uchee Creek (Alabama) =

Stream in Alabama, U.S.

Coordinates: 32°18′23″N 84°57′22″W

Uchee Creek is a stream in the U.S. state of Alabama.

Uchee Creek derives its name from the Yuchi (or Uchee) Indians.
