= Sipsey Fork of the Black Warrior River =

Sipsey Fork
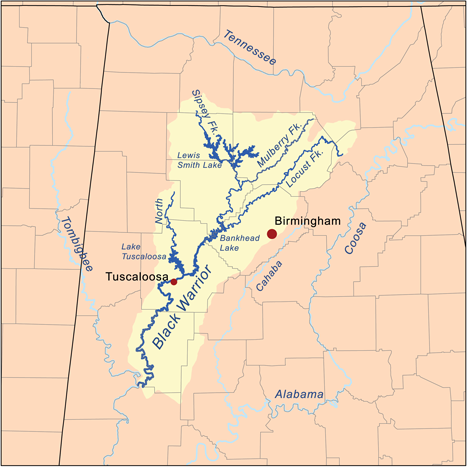
- Sipsey Fork within the Black Warrior Basin

Location
- Country: United States
- State: Alabama

Physical characteristics
- Source
  - coordinates: 34.32259°N 87.47224°W
- Mouth
  - coordinates: 33.81566°N 87.05722°W
- Length: 71 mi (114 km)

Basin features
- River system: Mobile-Tensaw

National Wild and Scenic River
- Type: Wild, Scenic
- Designated: October 28, 1988

The Sipsey Fork of the Black Warrior River is a 71-mile-long (114 km) river located in the U.S. state of Alabama, and is formed by the junction of Thompson and Hubbard creeks in the Sipsey Wilderness of Bankhead National Forest. The Sipsey Fork discharges into the Mulberry Fork. The Sipsey Fork below Lewis Smith Lake is one of the few places within the state to catch rainbow trout.
