= Okatuppa Creek =

Stream in Choctaw County, Alabama, U.S.

Coordinates: 31°53′01″N 88°18′00″W

Okatuppa Creek is a stream in Choctaw County in the U.S. state of Alabama.

Okatuppa is a name derived from the Choctaw language purported to mean "parted water" or "dammed". Variant names include "Bogueloosa Creek", "Oak Trapper Creek", "Oak Tuppa Creek", "Oakatuppa Creek", "Oaktupa Creek", "Oaktuppa Creek", and "Oka Tuppah Creek".
