= Bear Creek (Tennessee River tributary) =

Stream in Mississippi and Alabama, U.S.

Coordinates: 34.8917543°N 88.0975377°W

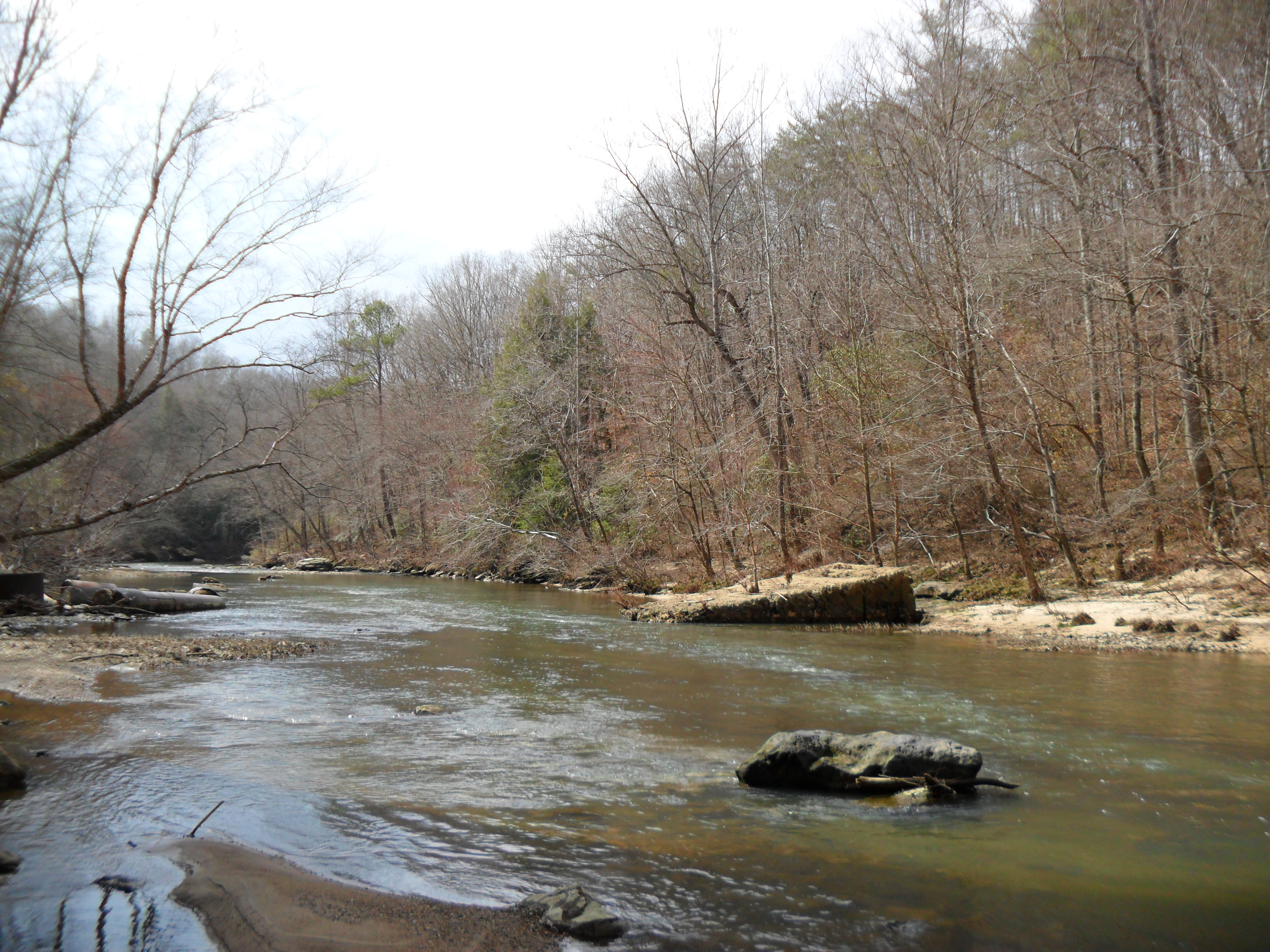
Bear Creek in Franklin County, Alabama

Bear Creek is a stream in the U.S. states of Mississippi and Alabama. The stream flows approximately 80 miles (130 km) before it empties into the Tennessee River.

Bear Creek is a rather large stream, with a mean annual discharge of approximately 1,126 cubic feet per second at Bishop, Alabama.

Bear Creek's name most likely comes from the Native Americans of the area, who saw many bears near its course.
