= Sipsey Creek (Buttahatchee River tributary) =

Stream in Alabama and Mississippi

Coordinates: 33.8745540°N 88.2880933°W

Sipsey Creek is a stream in the U.S. states of Alabama and Mississippi. It is a tributary to the Buttahatchee River.

Sipsey is a name derived from the Choctaw language meaning "poplar tree". Variant names are "Sipsey River", "Sipsie Fork", and "Sipsie River".
