= Flint Creek (Alabama) =

Coordinates: 34.5850924°N 86.9255617°W

Flint Creek is a major tributary along the Tennessee River that runs in the US state of Alabama for its entire length. Its headwaters are in northern Cullman County, and after running through Wheeler National Wildlife Refuge, it ends in the Tennessee River at Decatur.

The water level of the lower course of the creek is greatly affected by the level of Wheeler Lake. According to the Alabama Department of Conservation and Natural Resources, it is "one of Alabama's precious natural resources". Affected by "nonpoint source pollution", the Department claims that pollution has gone down in the decade since it became a pilot project for the EPA's watershed program.

The creek is popular for its fishing, especially of crappie. The water flows slowly, and is overgrown in many places. Fish include redear sunfish, bluegill, and longear sunfish, two kinds of black bass (spotted bass and largemouth bass), and various kinds of catfish (flathead, blue, and channel). Yellow perch were introduced to Wheeler Lake and are found in the creek also.
