= Sipsey River =

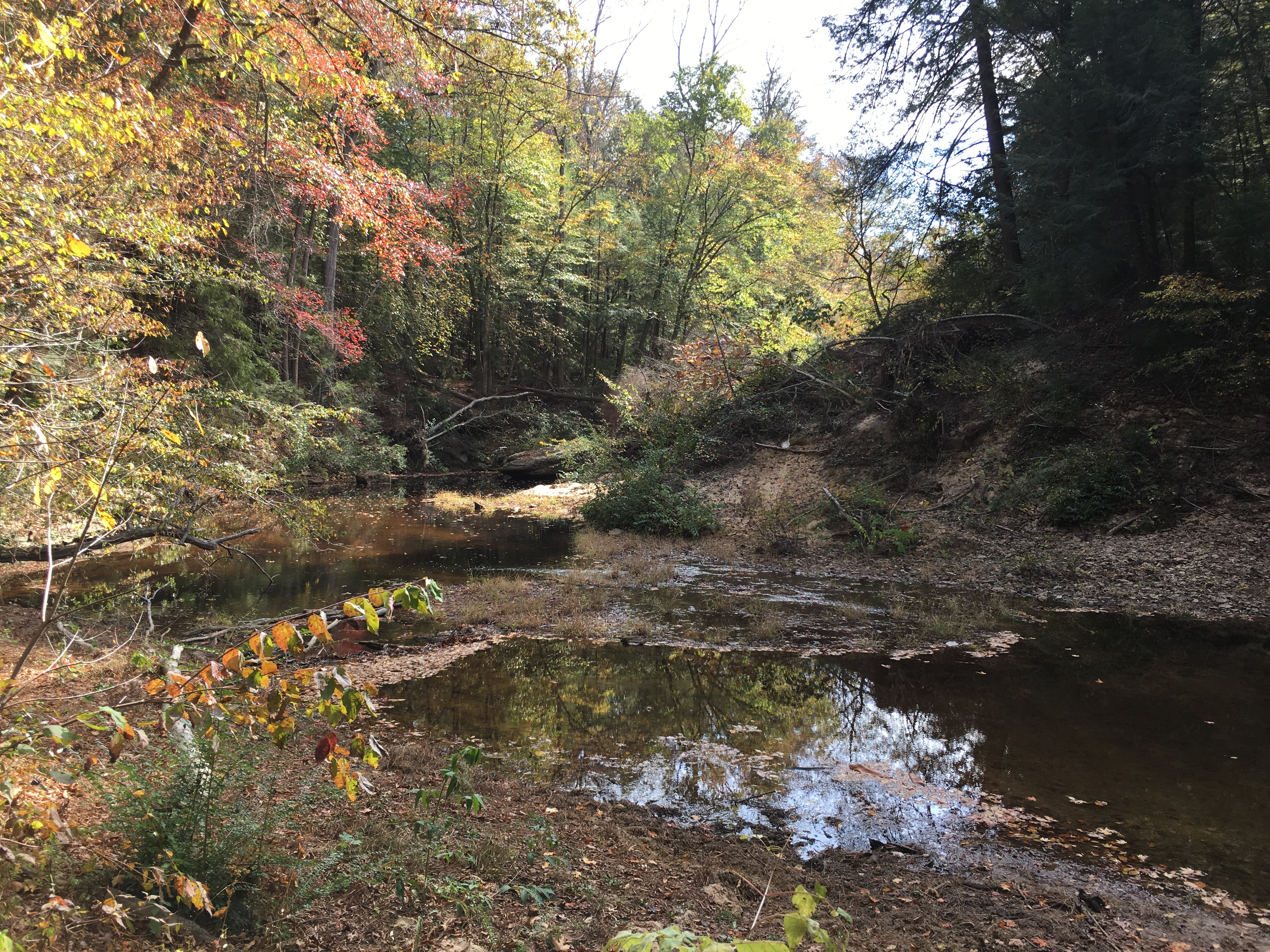
- Sipsey River in the 2016 drought

Location
- Country: United States
- State: Alabama

Physical characteristics
- Source
  - coordinates: 33.91454°N 87.68724°W
- Mouth
  - coordinates: 33.00401°N 88.17197°W
- Length: 233 km (145 mi)
- Basin size: 2,044 km^{2} (789 sq mi)
- Discharge
  - average: 810 cu ft/s (23 m^{3}/s)

The Sipsey River is a 145-mile-long (233 km) swampy low-lying river in west central Alabama. The Sipsey is surrounded by wetland habitat. The Sipsey River has many oxbow lakes as a result of its meandering nature. It originates near Glen Allen, and discharges into the Tombigbee River near Vienna. The river belongs to the Southeastern Coastal Plain and features an eastern deciduous forest terrestrial biome. Sipsey is a name derived from the Choctaw language meaning "poplar tree".

== See also ==
- List of rivers of Alabama
