= Mulberry Fork of the Black Warrior River =

Mulberry Fork
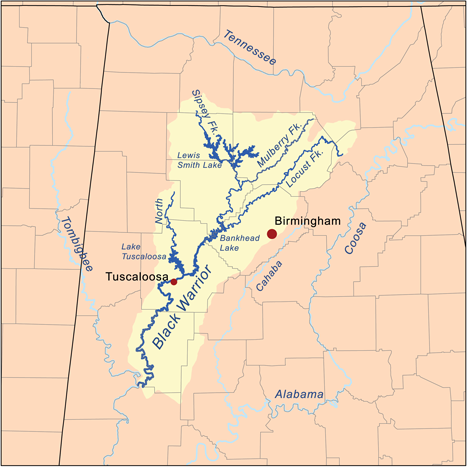

Physical characteristics
- Source
  - coordinates: 34.25426°N 86.51498°W
- Mouth
  - coordinates: 33.55705°N 87.18749°W
- Length: 102 mi (164 km)

Mulberry Fork is a tributary of the Black Warrior River, 102 miles (164 km) long, in the U.S. state of Alabama. The Mulberry Fork is one of three forks, along with the Locust Fork and the Sipsey Fork, that join to form the Black Warrior. It drains part of the southernmost end of the Appalachian Mountains north and west of Birmingham in the drainage basin of the Mobile River.

The Mulberry Fork rises in northeastern Cullman County, south of Arab. It flows in tight meanders along a ridge of the foothills, forming the boundary between Cullman and Blount counties. It receives the Sipsey Fork from the northwest approximately 15 mi (24 km) east of Jasper. In southern Walker County it enters Bankhead Lake reservoir, forming the northernmost arm of the lake, approximately 10 mi (16 km) long. The confluence with the Locust Fork is now submerged within Bankhead Lake, approximately 25 mi (40 km) west of Birmingham.
