= List of rivers of Mississippi =

The list of rivers in Mississippi includes any rivers that flow through part of the State of Mississippi. The major rivers in Mississippi are the Mississippi River, Pearl River, Pascagoula River and the Tombigbee River, along with their main tributaries: the Tallahatchie River, Yazoo River, Big Black River, Leaf River, and the Chickasawhay River. However, other tributaries vary in size, with some also draining rather sizable areas of Mississippi (Also see list below: Alphabetically).

The various rivers, with their tributaries, can be organized by drainage basin, as shown in the related maps below.

== By drainage basin ==
This list is arranged by drainage basin, with respective tributaries indented under each larger stream's name. All rivers in Mississippi eventually flow into the Gulf of Mexico.

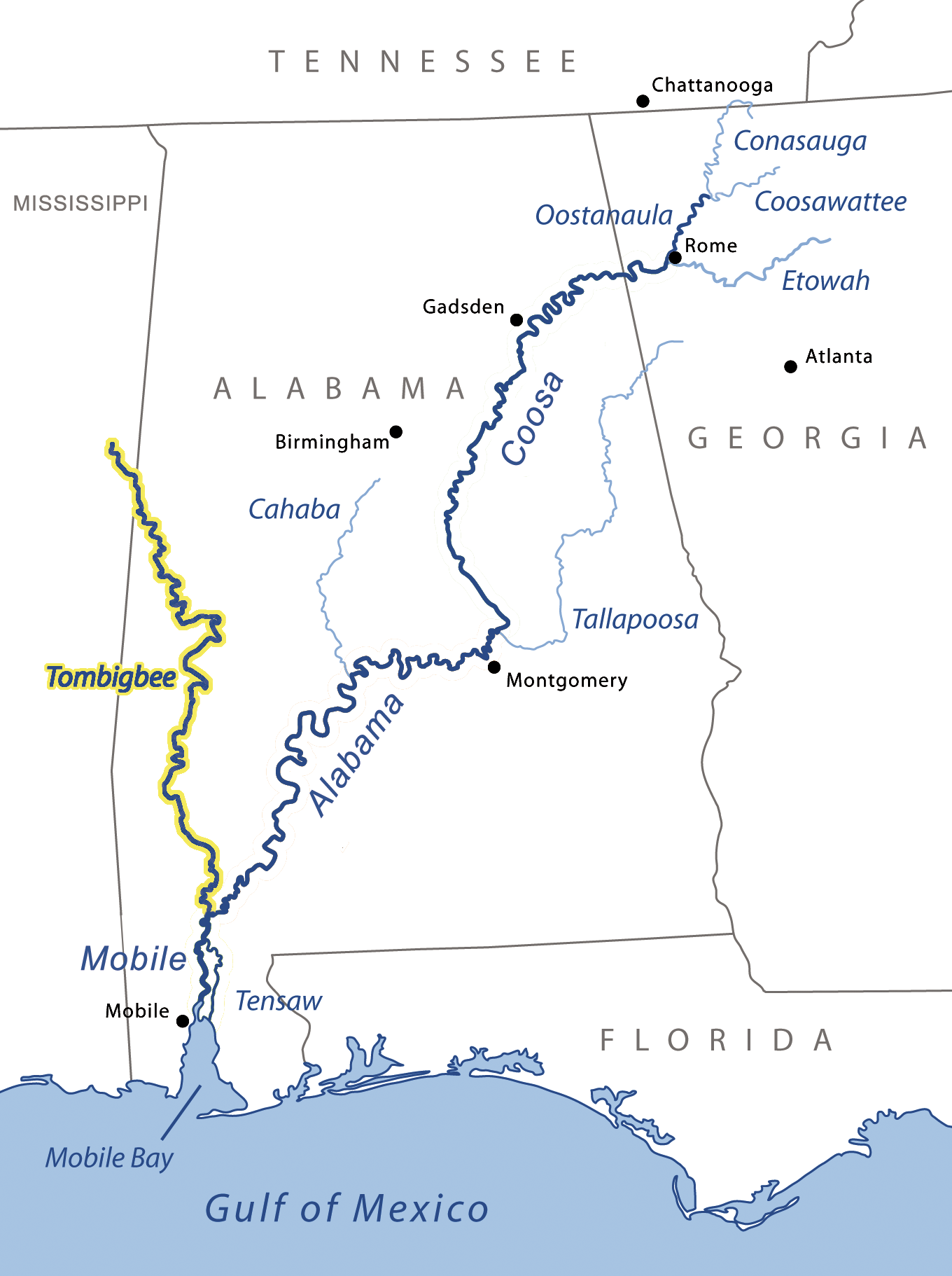
Tombigbee River basin

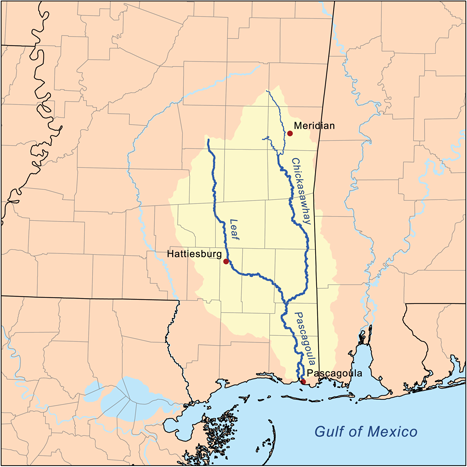
Pascagoula Drainage Basin

- Mobile River (AL)
  - Tombigbee River
    - Sucarnoochee River
    - Noxubee River
    - Bogue Chitto
    - Luxapallila Creek
    - Oak Slush Creek
    - Tibbee Creek
    - Buttahatchee River
    - Twenty Mile Creek
    - Town Creek
    - East Fork Tombigbee River
- Tennessee River
  - Osborne Creek
  - Wolf Creek
- Pascagoula River
  - Escatawpa River
  - Black Creek
    - Red Creek
  - Chickasawhay River
    - Buckatunna Creek
    - Chunky River
      - Chunky Creek
      - Okahatta Creek
    - Okatibbee Creek
  - Leaf River
    - Bogue Homo
    - Tallahala Creek
      - Tallahoma Creek
    - Bouie River
      - Bowie Creek
      - Okatoma Creek
    - Oakohay Creek
    - West Tallahala Creek
- Old Fort Bayou
  - Bayou Talla
- Tchoutacabouffa River
- Biloxi River
  - Little Biloxi River
- Wolf River
- Jourdan River
  - Bayou Talla
  - Catahoula Creek

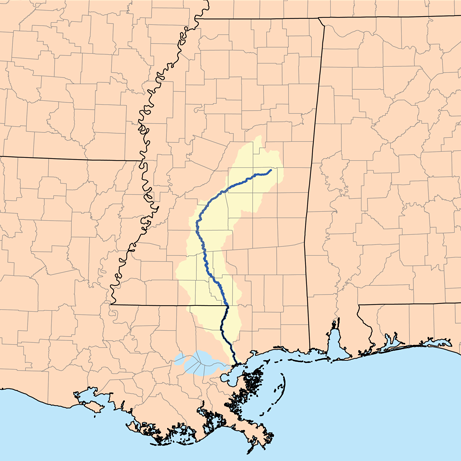
Pearl Drainage Basin

- Pearl River
  - Hobolochitto Creek
  - Bogue Chitto
  - Strong River
  - Yockanookany River
  - Tuscolameta Creek
  - Lobutcha Creek
  - Nanih Waiya Creek
    - Bogue Chitto
  - Tallahaga Creek
- Tangipahoa River
- Tickfaw River
- Amite River

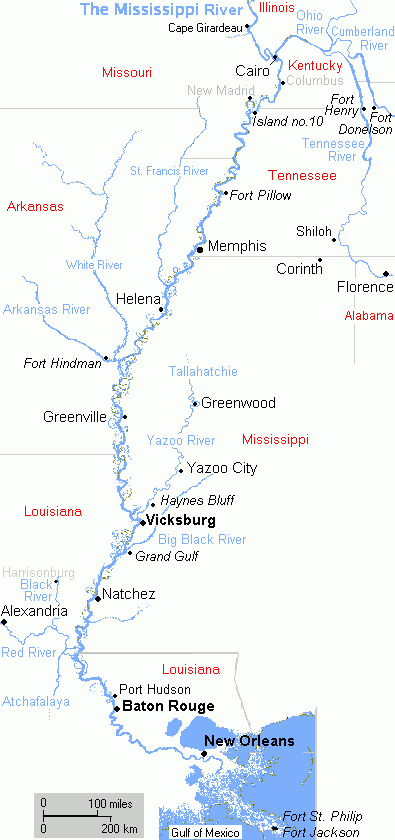
Mississippi River

- Mississippi River
  - Buffalo River
    - Little Buffalo River
  - Homochitto River
  - Coles Creek
  - Bayou Pierre
    - Little Bayou Pierre
    - Tallahalla Creek
  - Big Black River
  - Yazoo River
    - Deer Creek
    - Little Sunflower River
    - Sunflower River (or Big Sunflower River)
      - Bogue Phalia
      - Quiver River
      - Hushpuckena River
    - Tallahatchie River
      - Cassidy Bayou
      - Tillatoba Creek
      - Panola Quitman Floodway
        - Yocona River
        - Little Tallahatchie River
          - Tippah River
      - Coldwater River
      - Old Little Tallahatchie River
        - Old Yocona River
    - Yalobusha River
      - Skuna River
  - Wolf River
  - Hatchie River
    - Tuscumbia River
  - Ohio River (KY)
    - Tennessee River

== Alphabetically ==
- Bayou Pierre
- Bayou Talla (Hancock County)
- Bayou Talla (Jackson County)
- Big Black River
- Biloxi River
- Black Creek
- Bogue Chitto (Nanih Waiya Creek)
- Bogue Chitto (Tombigbee River)
- Bogue Chitto (West Pearl River)
- Bogue Homo
- Bogue Phalia
- Bouie River
- Bowie Creek
- Buckatunna Creek
- Buffalo River
- Buttahatchee River
- Cassidy Bayou
- Catahoula Creek
- Chickasawhay River
- Chunky River
- Coldwater River
- Coles Creek
- Deer Creek
- East Fork Tombigbee River
- Escatawpa River
- Fair River
- Hatchie River
- Hobolochitto Creek
- Homochitto River
- Hushpuckena River
- Jourdan River
- Leaf River
- Little Bayou Pierre
- Little Biloxi River
- Little Buffalo River
- Little Sunflower River
- Little Tallahatchie River
- Lobutcha Creek
- Luxapallila Creek
- Mississippi River
- Nanih Waiya Creek
- Noxubee River
- Oak Slush Creek
- Oakohay Creek
- Old Little Tallahatchie River
- Old Yocona River
- Okatibbee Creek
- Okatoma Creek
- Panola Quitman Floodway
- Pascagoula River
- Pearl River
- Quiver River
- Red Creek
- Skuna River
- Strong River
- Sucarnoochee River
- Sunflower River
- Tallahaga Creek
- Tallahala Creek
- Tallahalla Creek
- Tallahatchie River
- Tallahoma Creek
- Tangipahoa River
- Tchoutacabouffa River
- Tennessee River
- Tibbee Creek
- Tillatoba Creek
- Tippah River
- Town Creek
- Tuscolameta Creek
- Tuscumbia River
- Twenty Mile Creek
- West Tallahala Creek
- Wolf River (Mississippi)
- Wolf River (Tennessee)
- Yalobusha River
- Yazoo River
- Yockanookany River
- Yocona River

== See also ==
- List of rivers in the United States
