= Pat Harrison Waterway District =

Mississippi state government agency

- Formation: 1962
- Type: State Agency
- Purpose: Flood control, Recreation
- Headquarters: 17 J M Tatum Industrial Drive, Suite 120; Hattiesburg, Mississippi
- Region served: Southeastern and East Central Mississippi
- Executive Director: Hiram Boone
- Website: Pat Harrison Waterway District

Pat Harrison Waterway District (PHWD) is a Mississippi State Agency with headquarters in Hattiesburg. The agency was created in 1962 with a directive of flood control in southeastern and east central Mississippi.

== History and mission ==
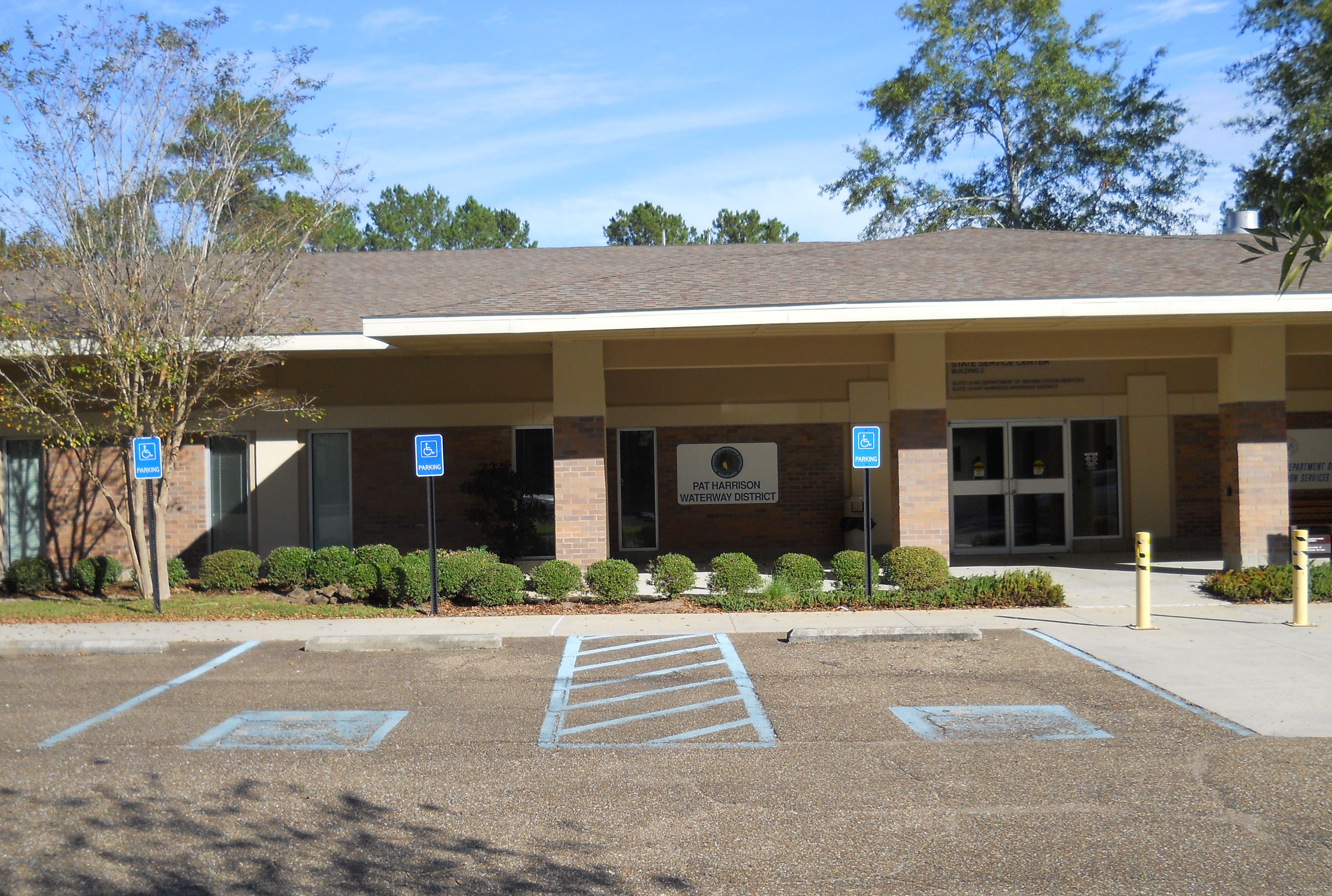
Pat Harrison Waterway District Headquarters in Hattiesburg, MS

When the Waterway District was created in 1962, its main mission was flood control for rivers and their tributaries along the Pascagoula River Basin in southeastern and east central Mississippi. In addition to flood control, the agency's mission expanded to include water management and recreation. The District derives its name from Pat Harrison, who served Mississippi as U.S. Representative (1911–19) and Senator (1919-41).

== Funding ==
Funding for PHWD comes from ad valorem taxes collected in member Counties, park recreation fees, timber sales, and interest from investments. PHWD is governed by an 18-member Board of Directors, with one Director appointed from each of the 15 member Counties and three Directors appointed by the Governor of Mississippi. Full-time employees are located at the central office in Hattiesburg and at the District's eight water parks.

== Member counties ==
Originally, there were 15 Mississippi counties in the Pat Harrison Waterway District:

- Clarke County
- Covington County
- Forrest County
- George County
- Greene County
- Jackson County
- Jasper County
- Jones County
- Lamar County
- Lauderdale County
- Newton County
- Perry County
- Smith County
- Stone County
- Wayne County

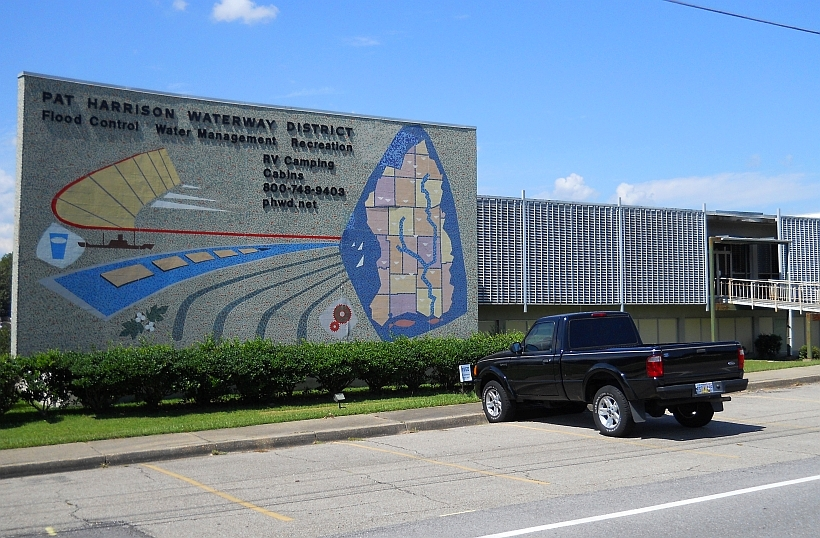
Former Pat Harrison Waterway District Headquarters as it appeared in 2012

As of 2014, three counties (Forrest, Jasper, and Lamar) had withdrawn from the District.

In the summer of 2018, PHWD moved out of their 56-year-old office building located at 6081 U.S. Route 49 south, as part of a lawsuit settlement with Forrest County. In September 2018, Forrest County Board of Supervisors ordered the demolition of the county-owned building, including its distinctive mural on the front facade, to facilitate future road construction near Forrest General Hospital.

== Water resources ==
Water resources in the Pascagoula River Basin, over which Pat Harrison Waterway District has jurisdiction, include:

- Big Creek
- Black Creek
- Bogue Homa Lake
- Bossie Creek
- Buckatunna Creek
- Chickasawhay River
- Chunky River
- Escatawpa River
- Gains Creek
- Leaf River
- Little Black Creek
- Okatoma Creek
- Pascagoula River
- Red Creek
- Tallahala Creek
- Thompson Creek

== Water parks ==
The agency oversees eight water parks with public amenities that include camp sites, boat launches, cabins, picnic areas, swimming areas, and meeting facilities.

- Archusa Creek Water Park (Quitman, MS)
- Big Creek Water Park (Soso, MS)
- Dry Creek Water Park (Mount Olive, MS)
- Dunns Falls Water Park (Enterprise, MS)
- Flint Creek Water Park (Wiggins)
- Maynor Creek Water Park (Waynesboro, MS)
- Okatibbee Water Park (Meridian, MS)
- Turkey Creek Water Park (Decatur, MS)

Little Black Creek Water Park (Lumberton, MS) was formerly managed by PHWD, but was leased to a private developer in 2013.
