= Bogue Homo =

Bogue Homo or Bogue Homa may refer to:

- Bogue Homo (Chickasawhay River tributary), a stream in Mississippi
- Bogue Homo (Leaf River tributary), a stream in Mississippi
- Bogue Homa (Pearl River tributary), a stream in Mississippi
