= Tippah Creek =

Tippah Creek may refer to:

- North Tippah Creek
- South Tippah Creek

== See also ==
- Tippah River
