= Tippah =

Tippah could refer to:

- Tippah County, Mississippi, United States
- Tippah River, in Mississippi, United States

- North Tippah Creek, feeding the Tippah River
- South Tippah Creek, the other feeder of the Tippah River

- Tippah Dwan, Australian netball player
