= Bayou Talla =

Bayou Talla may refer to:

- Bayou Talla (Jourdan River tributary), a stream in Hancock County, Mississippi, United States
- Bayou Talla (Old Fort Bayou tributary), a stream in Jackson County, Mississippi, United States
