= Merrill, Mississippi =

- Unincorporated community
- Location within Mississippi Location within the United States
- Coordinates: 30°58′45″N 88°43′14″W
- Country: United States
- State: Mississippi
- County: George
- Elevation: 52 ft (16 m)
- Time zone: UTC-6 (Central (CST))
  - Summer (DST): UTC-5 (CDT)
- GNIS feature ID: 673497

Merrill is an unincorporated community in George County, Mississippi, United States. Prior to the creation of George County, Merrill was located in Greene County.

Merrill is located on the former Gulf, Mobile and Ohio Railroad and was once home to nine general stores, three turpentine distilleries, two sawmills, and a drugstore.

A post office operated under the name Merrill from 1898 to 1960.

The Merrill Bridge is the oldest still-intact bridge over the Pascagoula River. The bridge was built in 1928 and was the first bridge to cross the Pascagoula. It replaced a ferry that previously operated on the site. The bridge is now closed to traffic and is listed as a Mississippi Landmark. However, foot traffic is welcome on the bridge. The confluence of the Leaf River and Chickasawhay River can be seen north of the bridge.
