= Choctaw National Wildlife Refuge =

Protected area in Alabama, United States

- IUCN category IV (habitat/species management area)
- Location within the United States
- Location: Choctaw County, Alabama, United States
- Nearest city: Coffeeville, Alabama
- Coordinates: 31°49′15.2688″N 88°11′03.9228″W
- Area: 4,218 acres (1,707 ha)
- Established: 1964
- Visitors: 30,000 (in 2004)
- Governing body: U.S. Fish and Wildlife Service
- Website: Choctaw NWR

The Choctaw National Wildlife Refuge is a 4,218 acre (17.07 km^{2}) National Wildlife Refuge located along the Tombigbee River near Coffeeville, Alabama. Named after the Choctaw tribe, it was established to provide a wood duck brood habitat and serve as a protected wintering area for waterfowl.

Of the 4,218 acres (17.07 km^{2}) of the refuge, approximately 1,802 acres (7.29 km^{2}) of lakes, sloughs, and creeks, 2,265 acres (9.17 km^{2}) of bottomland hardwoods, and 151 acres (0.61 km^{2}) of croplands and moist soil units. The facility has a four-person staff with a $882,000 (FY 2005) annual budget.

The refuge also manages an additional 236 acres (0.96 km^{2}) in perpetual conservation easements in eight parcels in Monroe, Sumter and Conecuh counties.

== History ==
Choctaw NWR was established in 1964 on lands acquired by the Corps of Engineers in conjunction with the Coffeeville Lock and Dam project.

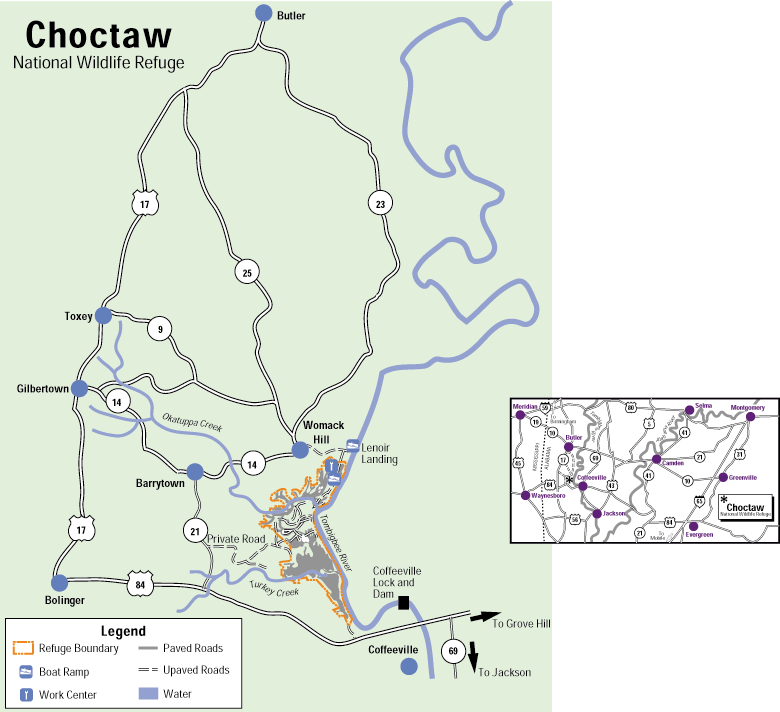
Map of Choctaw NWR

== Topography ==
The 4,218 acre (17.07 km^{2}) refuge encompasses approximately 1,802 acres (7.29 km^{2}) of lakes, sloughs, and creeks, 2,265 acres (9.17 km^{2}) of bottomland hardwoods, and 151 acres (0.61 km^{2}) of croplands and moist soil units.

The refuge borders the Tombigbee River (and the Tennessee-Tombigbee Waterway) for 6.5 miles (10.5 km). Okatuppa and Turkey Creeks divide the refuge into three unites. The river and the creeks make a large portion of the refuge accessible only by boat. The entire refuge is subject to annual Spring flooding.

== Wildlife and protected species ==
Four hundred nest boxes are maintained for wood ducks resulting in the hatching of approximately 2500 birds each year. Wintering waterfowl numbers can exceed 10,000. In addition to the moist soil, crops such as millet, milo, wheat, and clover are grown in fields for the benefit of both waterfowl and resident wildlife.

In addition, numerous neotropical migrant and wading birds benefit from management activities. Following a successful bald eagle program in the early 1990s the refuge hosts a nesting pair of eagles each winter. In the summer, wood storks can be found resting and feeding in the back-water sloughs and moist soil units. Other wildlife include white-tailed deer, gray squirrels, turkey, raccoons, opossum, alligator, and beaver.

== Facilities ==
A small research facility, "Cypess Tupelo Research Natural Area" encompasses 35 acres (140,000 m^{2}) and is protected from the damaging effects of beavers on individual trees and water management.

Choctaw NWR offers opportunities for fishing, boating, hunting, hiking, and wildlife observation. A .75 mile trail leads to a wildlife observation platform overlooking the moist soil unit.

Fishing is popular with bass, white perch, catfish, and bream in abundance throughout the creeks and rivers. Second in popularity is hunting. White-tailed deer and feral hogs may be hunted as well as squirrel, rabbit, and raccoon.

== Images ==
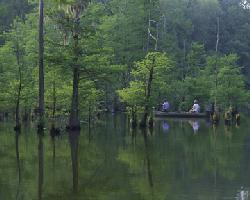

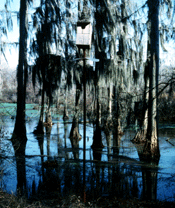

== See also ==
- List of National Wildlife Refuges
