= East Fork Tombigbee River =

Coordinates: 33.974426°N 88.522439°W

East Fork Tombigbee River was a historical name of a tributary stream of the Tombigbee River in northeast Mississippi. Its confluence with Town Creek in Monroe County was the historical beginning of the Tombigbee. Today, however, what was once known as the east fork is now designated as the Tombigbee.

== See also ==
- List of rivers of Mississippi
