= Bouie River =

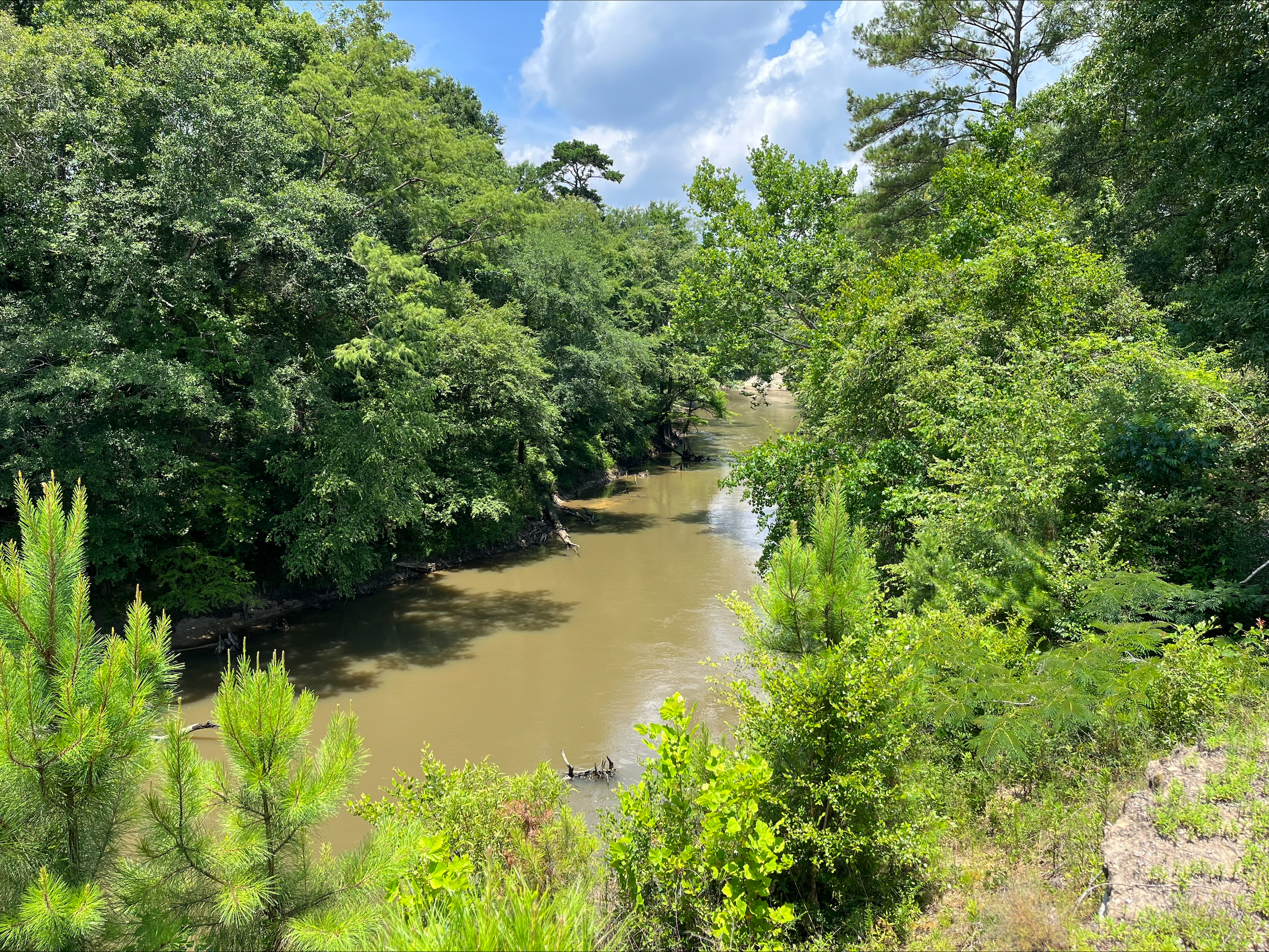

Physical characteristics
- Source
  - location: Simpson County, Mississippi
  - coordinates: 31°49′56″N 89°50′56″W
  - elevation: 539 ft (164 m)
- Mouth
  - location: Confluence with the Leaf River at Hattiesburg, Mississippi
  - coordinates: 31°20′37″N 89°16′49″W
  - elevation: 121 ft (37 m)
- Length: 60 mi (97 km)

Basin features
- Progression: Bouie River → Leaf → Pascagoula → Gulf of Mexico
- GNIS ID: 690980

The Bouie River, sometimes known as the Bowie River, is a tributary of the Leaf River, 60 miles (97 km) long, in southern Mississippi in the United States. Via the Leaf River, it is part of the watershed of the Pascagoula River, which flows to the Gulf of Mexico.

== Course ==
The Bouie rises in southern Simpson County and flows generally southeastwardly through Jefferson Davis and Covington Counties, forming part of the boundary between the two, and into northwestern Forrest County, where it flows into the Leaf River at Hattiesburg.

== Variant names ==
The United States Board on Geographic Names settled on "Bouie River" as the stream's official name in 1990. According to the Geographic Names Information System, it has also been known as:

- Bone Creek
- Boue Creek
- Bouie Creek
- Bouyer Creek
- Bovie River
- Bowie Creek (in part, above the mouth of Okatoma Creek)
- Bowie River (in part, below the mouth of Okatoma Creek)
- Boyer Creek
- Buoy Creek

== See also ==
- List of Mississippi rivers
