= Wahalak Creek =

Stream in Mississippi, United States

Coordinates: 32.8934633°N 88.5000397°W

Wahalak Creek is a stream in the U.S. state of Mississippi. It is a tributary to the Noxubee River.

Wahalak is a name derived from the Choctaw language purported to mean "to branch out, to spread, pronged". Variant names are "Wahorlock Creek", "Warloc Creek", and "Warloe Creek".
