= Tallahoma Creek =

Stream in Mississippi, United States

Coordinates: 31.6134979°N 89.1797805°W

Tallahoma Creek is a stream in the U.S. state of Mississippi. It is a right tributary of Tallahala Creek, joining it east of Ellisville.

Tallahoma is a name derived from the Choctaw language meaning "red rock". Variant names are "Tali Homma Creek", "Talla Homa Creek", and "Tallohoma Creek".
