= Quiver River =

River in the United States

Coordinates: 33.485576°N 90.521488°W

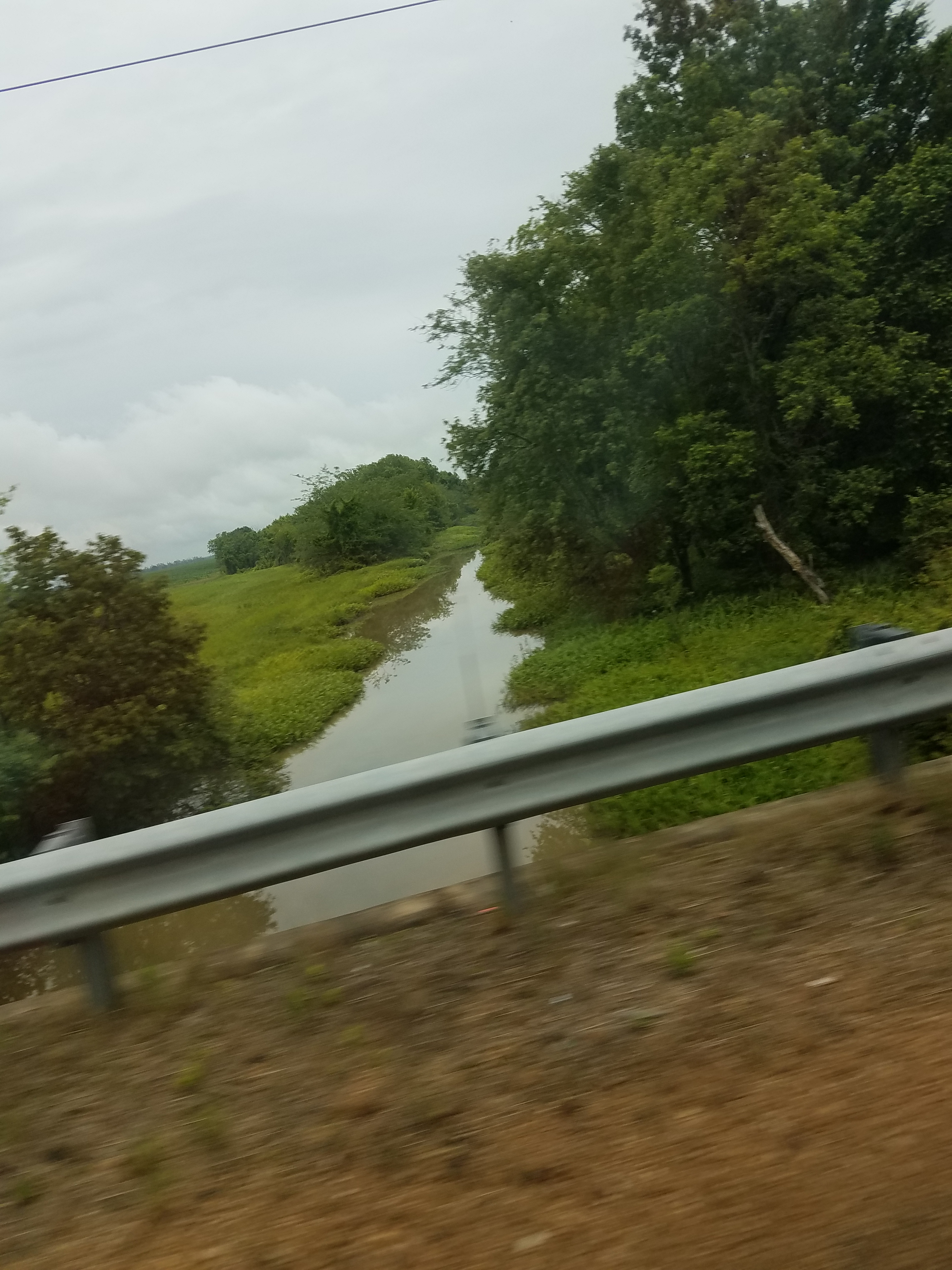
The source of the Quiver River near Tutwiler, Mississippi

Quiver River is a river in Mississippi, United States.

The source of Quiver River is the Upper Quiver River and Lower Quiver River, located northwest of Sumner, Mississippi.

Quiver River flows south, passing through Tallahatchie County, Leflore County, and Sunflower County, before flowing into the Sunflower River northwest of Moorhead, Mississippi.

During the American Civil War, the Confederate vessel Emma Bett was captured on May 30, 1863, and set afire on the Quiver River near the Sunflower River. The Confederate steamer "Dewdrop" was also sunk in the Quiver River north of Moorhead, MS. Her owner, Sherman Parisot, set her ablaze when the Union troops were with 60 yards of capturing her.

== See also ==
- List of Mississippi rivers
