= Okatoma Creek =

Okatoma Creek Okatoma River
- Etymology: Choctaw word meaning "shining water"

Location
- Country: United States
- State: Mississippi
- City: Seminary, Mississippi

Physical characteristics
- Source
  - coordinates: 31°56′30″N 89°45′55″W
- Mouth: Bouie River
  - coordinates: 31°25′50″N 89°24′12″W
  - elevation: 157 ft (48 m)

Okatoma Creek is a tributary of the Bouie River in the U.S. state of Mississippi. It is part of the Pascagoula River watershed.

Okatoma Creek is popular for canoeing and kayaking, particularly near Seminary, Mississippi, where several boat rentals are located. The creek offers several Class I falls and chutes. It has many flat spots, is easy to paddle, and boats can be ported past the whitewater when needed. The creek is also known for picnicking and camping.

The average temperatures in Seminary range from 36–39 °F (2–4 °C) in the winter to 86–89 °F (30–32 °C) in the summer. The spring and fall months have higher amounts of rain, creating better rides on the river; the temperatures at this time are bet 60–74 °F (16–23 °C).

== Name ==
Okatoma is a name derived from the Choctaw language, purported to mean either "radiant water" or "foggy water".

Variant names include "Lawsons Creek," "Oakatoma Creek," "Ocatona Creek," "Oka Toma Creek," "Okatoma River," "Okatomy Creek," "Okatona Creek," and "Sun Creek".

== See also ==
- List of rivers of Mississippi
