= Buttahatchee River =

River in Alabama and Mississippi

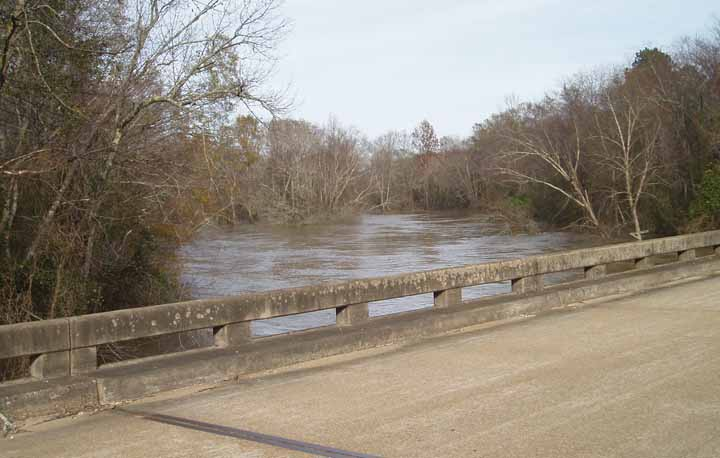
- A bridge crossing of the Buttahatchee River in Monroe County, Mississippi

Location
- Country: United States
- State: Alabama, Mississippi

Physical characteristics
- Source
  - location: Winston County, Alabama
  - coordinates: 34°11′13″N 87°37′19″W
- Mouth: Tombigbee River
  - location: Border between Monroe County and Lowndes County, Mississippi
  - coordinates: 33°39′2″N 88°30′49″W
- Length: 75 mi (121 km)

The Buttahatchee River is a tributary of the Tombigbee River, about 125 miles (201 km) long, in northwestern Alabama and northeastern Mississippi in the United States. Via the Tombigbee River, it is part of the watershed of the Mobile River, which flows to the Gulf of Mexico.

== Course ==
The Buttahatchee River rises in northwestern Winston County, Alabama, near the town of Delmar, and flows generally westward through Marion County, where it collects a short tributary, the West Branch Buttahatchee River. At Hamilton, the river turns to the southwest and flows through Lamar County, Alabama and Monroe County, Mississippi; its lower reach is used to define part of the boundary between Monroe and Lowndes counties. The Buttahatchee joins the Tombigbee near Columbus Air Force Base, 12 mi (19 km) north-northwest of Columbus.

== Name ==
The name "Buttahatchee" is Choctaw for "sumac river", from bati, "sumac", and hahcha, "river".

The Board on Geographic Names settled on "Buttahatchee River" as the river's official name and spelling in 1947. According to the Geographic Names Information System, the Buttahatchee River has also been known as:

- Bartahatchie River
- Buddahatchie River
- Buddy Hatchee River
- Budie Hachey River
- Budihatchey River
- Butahatcha River
- Butahatchie River
- Butehatchee River
- Buteyhatchey River
- Buthatcha River
- Buttahachee River
- Buttahachie River
- Buttahatcha River
- Buttahatche River
- Buttahatchie River
- Buttahatchy River
- Buttatchie River
- Buttia Hatchey
- Buttiehachie River
- Buttiehatchee River
- Buttihachie River

== See also ==
- List of Alabama rivers
- List of Mississippi rivers
