= Little Biloxi River =

Hydrological feature in Mississippi, USA

Coordinates: 30.4976959°N 89.0461484°W

Little Biloxi River is a stream in the U.S. state of Mississippi. It is a tributary to the Biloxi River.

The Little Biloxi River is named for the Biloxi Indians, but the ultimate meaning of the word "Biloxi" is obscure. Variant names are "Little Biloxi Creek" and "West Branch Biloxi River".
