= Tallahatchie River =

River in Mississippi, US

Coordinates: 33°33′06″N 90°10′52″W

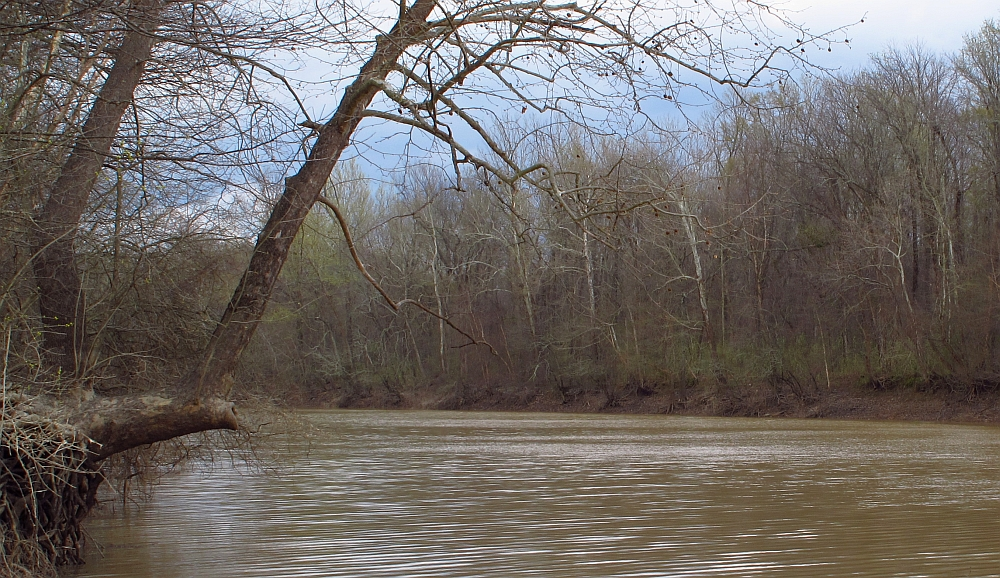
Tallahatchie River south of Minter City

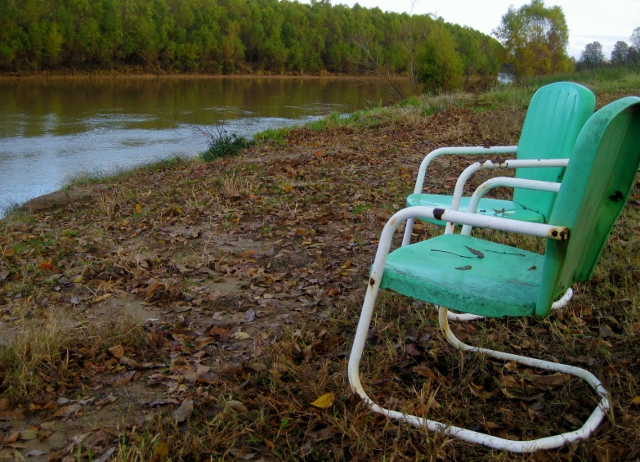
Tallahatchie River north of Greenwood

The Tallahatchie River is a river in Mississippi which flows 230 miles (370 km) from Tippah County, through Tallahatchie County, to Leflore County, where it joins the Yalobusha River to form the Yazoo River, which ultimately meets the Mississippi River at Vicksburg, Mississippi. The river is navigable for about 100 miles (160 km). At Money, Mississippi, the river's flow measures approximately 7,861 cubic feet (222.6 m^{3}) per second.

Tallahatchie is a Choctaw name meaning "rock of waters". The sources of the Tallahatchie River have outcrops of iron sandstone.

As part of the Flood Control Act of 1936, the federal government built an earth-filled flood control dam on the Tallahatchie near the town of Sardis, Mississippi, creating Sardis Lake.

== Tributaries ==
- Coldwater River
- Old Yocona River
- Yocona River Canal
- Little Tallahatchie River
- Old Little Tallahatchie River
- Panola Quitman Floodway
- McIvor Drainage Canal
- Tippah River
- Cassidy Bayou
- Black Bayou
- Ascalmore Creek
- Tillatoba Creek

== In popular culture ==
The river is mentioned in "Tallahatchie River Blues", recorded by Mattie Delaney in 1930. This blues song laments the devastation caused in the local African-American community by a flood on the normally shallow river. The river is 50 ft (15 m) deep with very sharp rocks.

The river has historical significance due to the 1955 murder of Emmett Till, whose body was dumped into the Tallahatchie River near Glendora, Mississippi. Till, who had been accused by his killers of allegedly whistling at a white woman, was brutally murdered in a barn near Drew, Mississippi. His body was then transported to the river, weighed down with a cotton gin fan tied around his neck by barbed wire, and sunk in the river, where it was found downstream by fishermen several days later. The killing served one of the key events that galvanized the Civil rights movement of the late 1950s and 1960s.

The name of the river was popularized in Bobbie Gentry's 1967 hit song "Ode to Billie Joe", which has the refrain, "Billie Joe McAllister jumped off the Tallahatchie Bridge." Although there are multiple bridges over the Tallahatchie River, none of which are officially named the "Tallahatchie Bridge", it was popularly identified with the wooden bridge crossing the river at Money, Mississippi, where Gentry had been photographed in publicity shots for the song. The wooden bridge collapsed in 1972 after being set alight by vandals. It has since been replaced by a concrete bridge. A 1979 film based on the song, titled Ode to Billy Joe, was partly filmed in the area.

== See also ==
- List of rivers of Mississippi
