= Buckatunna, Mississippi =

- CDP
- Location in the United States
- Coordinates: 31°32′21″N 88°31′41″W
- Country: United States
- State: Mississippi
- County: Wayne

Area
  - Total: 6.22 sq mi (16.10 km^{2})
  - Land: 6.19 sq mi (16.02 km^{2})
  - Water: 0.031 sq mi (0.08 km^{2})

Population (2020)
  - Total: 383
  - Density: 61.9/sq mi (23.91/km^{2})
- Time zone: UTC-6 (Central (CST))
  - Summer (DST): UTC-5 (CDT)
- ZIP code: 39322
- Area code: 601
- FIPS code: 28-09380

Buckatunna is a census-designated place (CDP) and unincorporated community located in Wayne County, Mississippi, United States. The population was 383 at the 2020 census. Buckatunna is located in the southeast corner of Wayne County, just west of the Alabama state line. Buckatunna has a post office with the zip code 39322.

The community takes its name from nearby Buckatunna Creek.

Buckatunna is the hometown of professional football player Jerrell Powe.

== History ==
In 1854, the Mobile and Ohio Railroad laid track and built a station in Buckatunna.

== Demographics ==
Historical population
Census	Pop.	Note	%±
2010	516		—
2020	383		−25.8%
U.S. Decennial Census

Buckatunna first appeared as a census designated place in the 2010 U.S. census.

=== Racial and ethnic composition ===
Buckatunna CDP, Mississippi – Racial and ethnic composition Note: the US Census treats Hispanic/Latino as an ethnic category. This table excludes Latinos from the racial categories and assigns them to a separate category. Hispanics/Latinos may be of any race.
Race / Ethnicity (NH = Non-Hispanic)	Pop 2010	Pop 2020	% 2010	% 2020
White alone (NH)	247	145	47.87%	37.86%
Black or African American alone (NH)	259	220	50.19%	57.44%
Native American or Alaska Native alone (NH)	0	0	0.00%	0.00%
Asian alone (NH)	0	0	0.00%	0.00%
Native Hawaiian or Pacific Islander alone (NH)	0	0	0.00%	0.00%
Other race alone (NH)	0	0	0.00%	0.00%
Mixed race or Multiracial (NH)	4	13	0.78%	3.39%
Hispanic or Latino (any race)	6	5	1.16%	1.31%
Total	516	383	100.00%	100.00%

=== 2020 census ===
As of the 2020 United States census, there were 383 people, 97 households, and 97 families residing in the CDP.
