= Bogue Homo (Chickasawhay River tributary) =

Stream in Mississippi

Coordinates: 31.8868213°N 88.7355987°W

Bogue Homo is a stream in the U.S. state of Mississippi. It is a tributary to the Chickasawhay River.

== Name ==
Bogue Homo is a name derived from the Choctaw language meaning "red creek". Variant names are"Bogue Homa Creek" and "Bogue Homer".
