= Sunflower River =

River in Mississippi, United States

Coordinates: 32°40′13″N 90°40′4″W

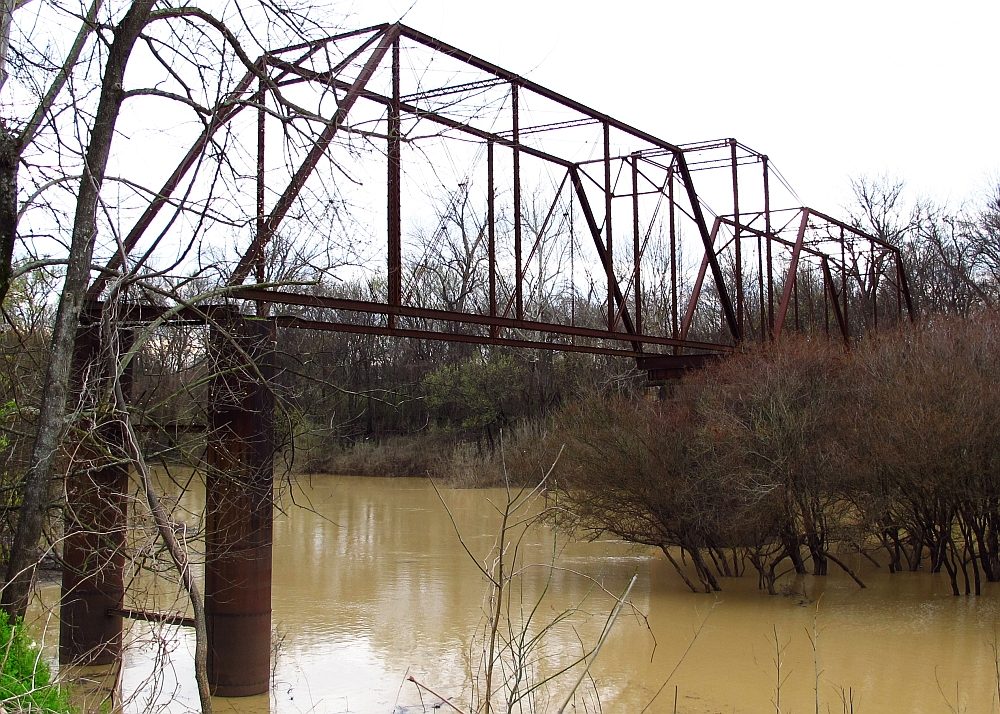
Sunflower River west of Ruleville, Mississippi.

The Sunflower River (also known as the Big Sunflower River) is one of the main tributaries of the Yazoo River in the U.S. state of Mississippi. The Sunflower follows an old channel of the Mississippi River as it winds between farms, neighborhoods, wetlands and abandoned sharecropper shacks. It is navigable by barge for 50 miles. It rises in DeSoto County, Mississippi near the Tennessee border and flows south for 100 miles to the Yazoo River, a major tributary of the Mississippi River. At Clarksdale, the county seat of Coahoma County, the annual Sunflower River Blues & Gospel Festival is held.

The United States Army Corps of Engineers maintains a navigation channel, thirty miles in length. Built in 1976, the channel is used by barges and pleasure craft.

According to the USGS, variant names include Hushpuckaman Creek. The Hushpuckena River drains the northwestern part of the Sunflower River Basin, Quiver River drains the northeastern portion, and Bogue Phalia drains the west central portion of the watershed, all of which lies in the alluvium soil of the Yazoo Delta. At Sunflower, Mississippi, the river flow measures approximately 1,099 cubic feet per second.

== Water quality ==
Like the Yazoo, this river is silt laden. The river collects mud from runoff in the bayous and small streams that feed it. The river has a distinct "Clear-Mud Line" where it meets the Yazoo, showing that the Big Sunflower is muddier than the Yazoo at their confluence.

== Archaeology ==
Early investigators of Native American culture identified many mound sites along the river. With what is now known of the cultures in the Southeast, scholars believe these earthwork mounds to have been built by cultures that existed before the emergence of the Choctaw and Chickasaw peoples. Clarence B. Moore conducted notable studies of the earthworks on the river near Holly Bluff, about a half a mile from the entrance to Lake George.

== Wildlife refuges ==
Land use along the river and in the watershed is predominantly agricultural, with many large-scale, industrial-style farms. From the antebellum period into the 20th century, cotton was the major commodity crop.

Three forested areas have been designated as national wildlife refuges, the Holt Collier National Wildlife Refuge, the Dahomey National Wildlife Refuge, and the Panther Swamp National Wildlife Refuge; all are managed by the U.S. Fish and Wildlife Service.

In August 2023 the largest state alligator of record was killed in the river.

== See also ==
- List of Mississippi rivers
