= Sucarnoochee River =

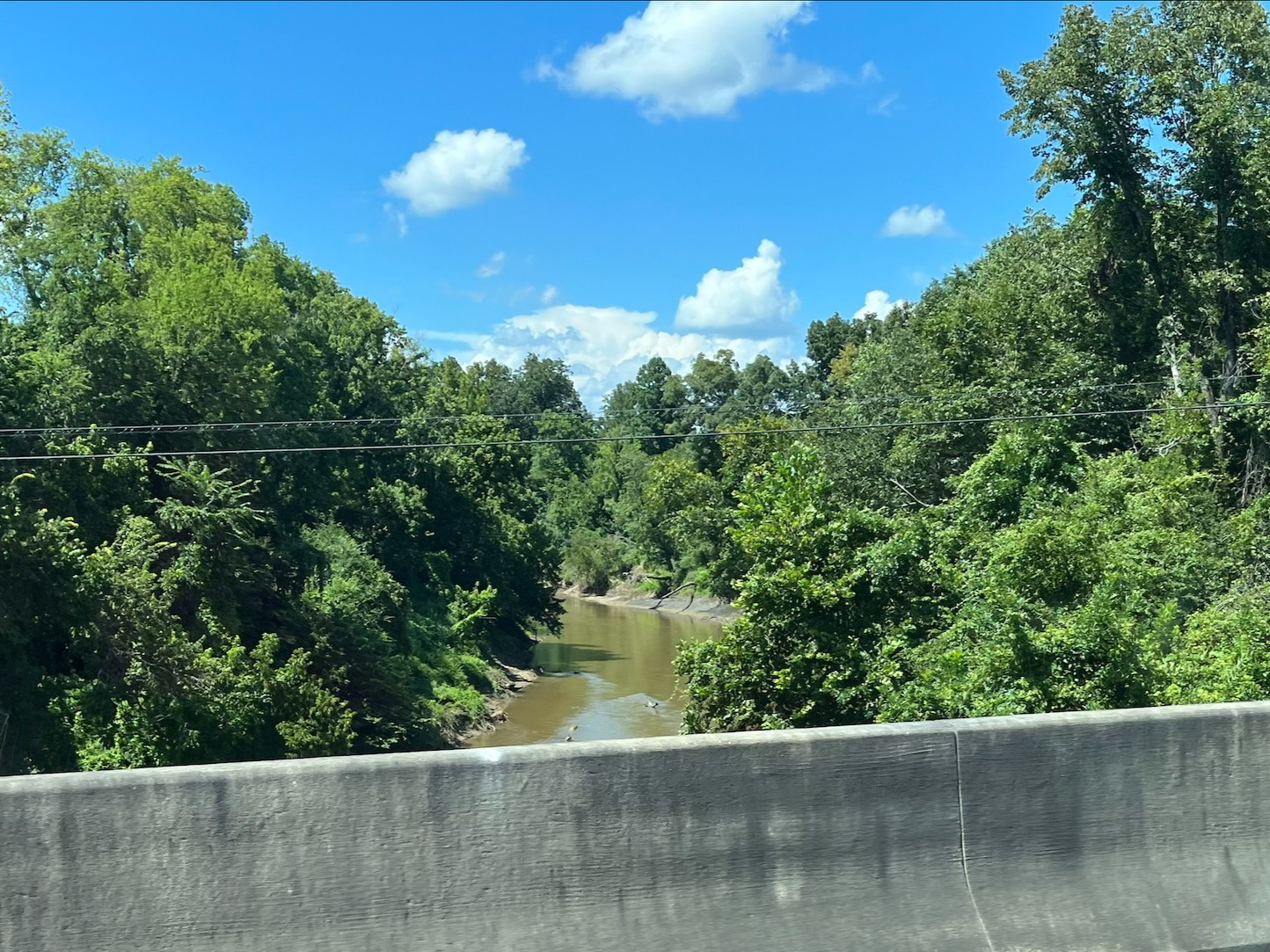
- Sucarnoochee River from U.S. Route 80 in Sumter County, Alabama

Location
- Country: United States
- State: Alabama and Mississippi

Physical characteristics
- Source
  - coordinates: 32.69877°N 88.48470°W
- Mouth
  - coordinates: 32.42322°N 88.04564°W
- Length: 49.5 mi (79.7 km)
- Basin size: 607 sq mi (1,570 km^{2})

The Sucarnoochee River is a river in Kemper County, Mississippi and Sumter County, Alabama. It originates at 32.69877°N 88.48470°W, near Porterville, Mississippi, and discharges into the Tombigbee River at 32.42322°N 88.04564°W. It is 49.5 miles (79.7 km) long and drains an area of 607 square miles (1,570 km^{2}).

Sucarnoochee is a name derived from the Choctaw language purported to mean either (sources vary) "hog's river" or "place where hogs fatten".

== See also ==
- List of rivers of Alabama
- List of rivers of Mississippi
