= Oak Slush Creek =

Stream in Mississippi, U.S.

Coordinates: 33°29′49″N 88°28′24″W

Oak Slush Creek is a stream in the U.S. state of Mississippi. It is a tributary of the Tombigbee River.

Oak Slush is a corrupted name derived from the Choctaw language purported to mean either "acorn mush" or "medicinal root".

== See also ==
- List of rivers of Mississippi
