= Leaf River (Mississippi) =

River in Mississippi, United States

Coordinates: 30°58′57″N 88°43′49″W

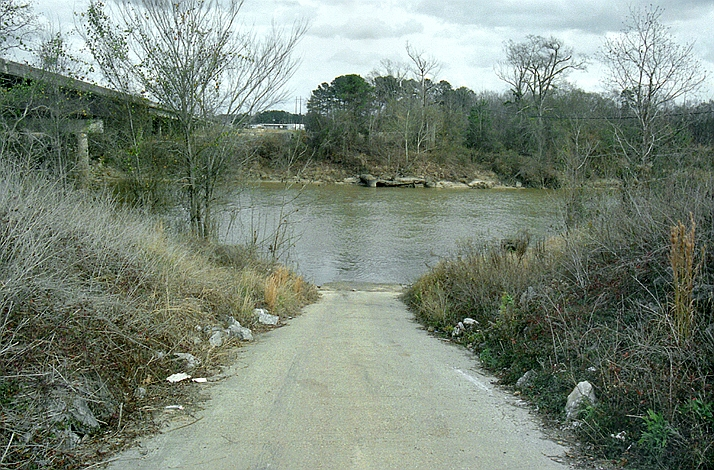
A boat ramp along the Leaf River in Hattiesburg. U.S. Highway 11 is at left.

The Leaf River is a river, about 180 mi (290 km) long, in southern Mississippi in the United States. It is a principal tributary of the Pascagoula River, which flows to the Gulf of Mexico.

== Course ==
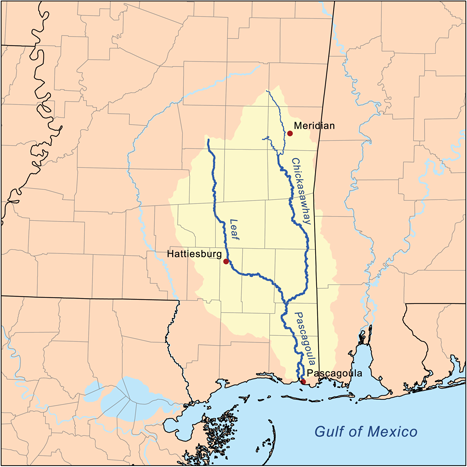

The Leaf River rises in the Bienville National Forest in southwestern Scott County and flows initially southward through eastern Smith, northeastern Covington, western Jones and northern Forrest Counties to Hattiesburg, where it collects the Bouie River. Below Hattiesburg, the river turns southeastward and flows through central Perry county, where it collects the Tallahala Creek and Bogue Homo, and southwestern Greene County, skirting the edge of the De Soto National Forest, into northern George County, where it joins the Chickasawhay River to form the Pascagoula River just upstream from the Merrill bridge.

== History ==
The Leaf River served as a trade route in the area before roads and trails were widely developed. It is recorded that traders made regular trips to people living near the river bringing with them supplies from Pascagoula. Legend says that one of these traders buried his profits, several thousand dollars in Spanish coins, near the banks of the Leaf River. The coins were later found in about 1854.

== Alleged pollution ==
While the upper stretches of the river enjoy an excellent reputation, the lower river has been the subject of claims of pollution since the 1990s. At that time, thousands of area residents filed suit against the Georgia-Pacific Corporation, claiming that its pulp mill released the dangerous chemicals, dioxins, into the river. In 1996, these suits were dismissed when the courts decided that there was no scientific proof that dangerous dioxin levels were present in the river or that Georgia-Pacific was negligent.

== Variant names ==
According to the Geographic Names Information System, the Leaf River has also been known as:

- Estapacha River
- Estopacha River
- Fiume
- Hashuphatchee River
- Hastabucha River
- Hastehatchee River
- Leaf Creek
- Pescaooula River (in part)
- Slapacha River
- Tallahoma River (in part)
- Tally Hooma Creek (in part)

== See also ==
- List of Mississippi rivers
- Leaf River Wildlife Management Area
