= Lobutcha Creek =

Stream in Mississippi, U.S.

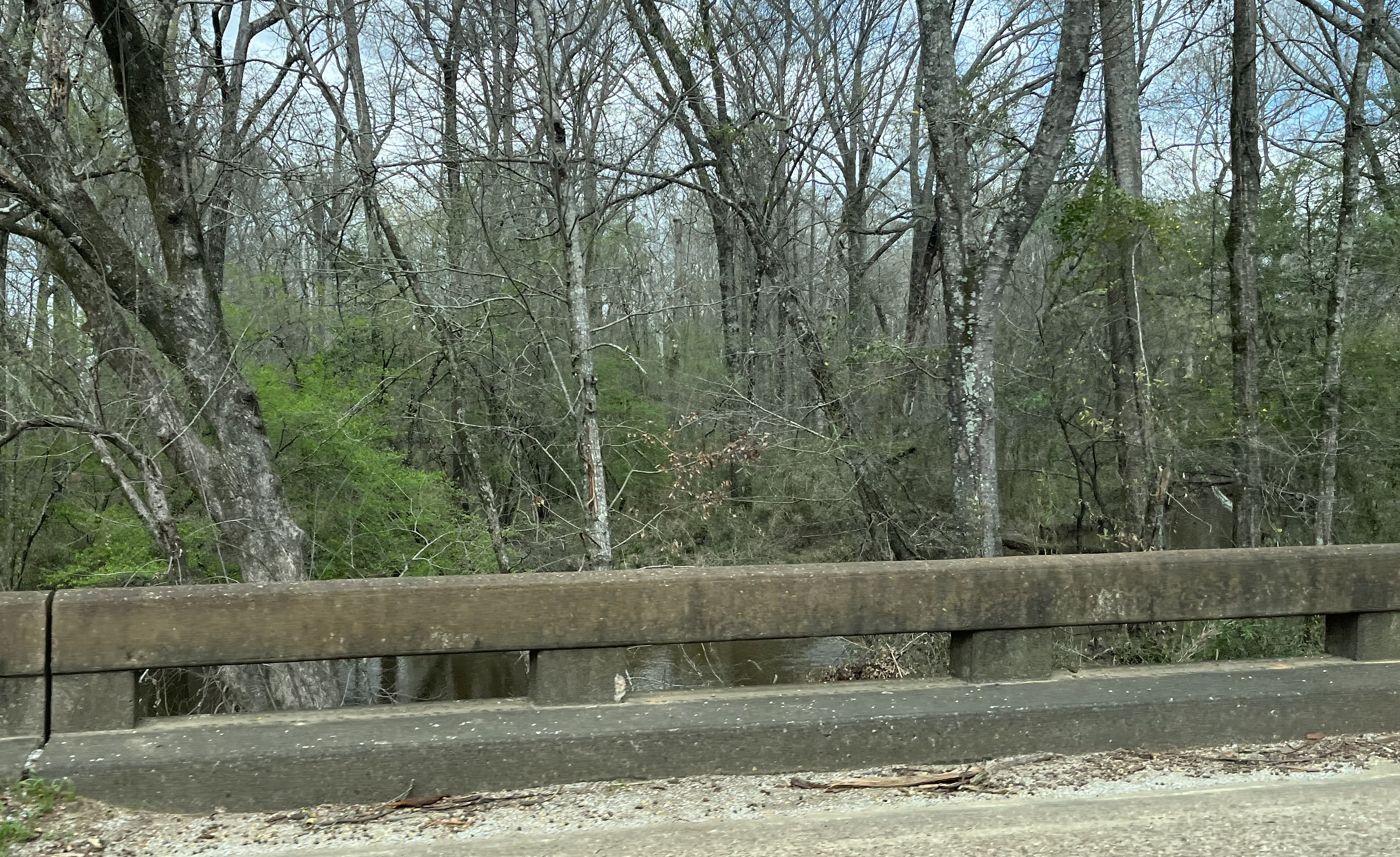
- Lobutcha Creek in Attala County, Mississippi

Location
- Country: United States
- State: Mississippi

Physical characteristics
- Source
  - coordinates: 33.1931814°N 89.2197894°W
- Mouth
  - coordinates: 32.7254138°N 89.4817363°W
- Length: 36.4 mi (58.6 km)
- Basin size: 309 mi^{2} (800 km^{2})

Lobutcha Creek is a stream in the U.S. state of Mississippi. It is a tributary to the Pearl River.

Lobutcha is a name derived from the Choctaw language purported to mean "boiled food" or "to make warm".

In 1886, the Mississippi Legislature outlawed placing fish traps in Lobutcha Creek.
