= Bogue Phalia =

Stream in Mississippi, U.S.

Coordinates: 33.2542876°N 90.7300955°W

Bogue Phalia is a stream in the U.S. state of Mississippi. It is a tributary to the Big Sunflower River.

Bogue Phalia is a name derived from the Choctaw language meaning "long creek". A variant spelling is "Bogue Phaliah".
