= Bayou Talla (Old Fort Bayou tributary) =

Stream in Jackson County, Mississippi, United States

Coordinates: 30°25′16″N 88°48′05″W

Bayou Talla is a stream in Jackcon County, Mississippi, United States, that is a tributary of the Old Fort Bayou.

Talla is a name derived from the Choctaw language meaning 'palmetto'.

== See also ==
- List of rivers in Mississippi
