= Bogue Homa (Pearl River tributary) =

Stream in Mississippi, USA

Coordinates: 30.2813059°N 89.6311687°W

Bogue Homa is a stream in the U.S. state of Mississippi. It is a tributary to the Pearl River.

Bogue Homa is a name derived from the Choctaw language meaning "red creek". A variant name is "Bougahoma Bayou".
