= Hushpuckena River =

River in US state of Mississippi

Coordinates: 33.9881660°N 90.7503779°W

Hushpuckena River is a stream in the U.S. state of Mississippi. It is a tributary of the Sunflower River, splitting off just north of Mississippi Highway 32's bridge over the Sunflower near the Mississippi State Penitentiary, flowing through the northwestern corner of the Mississippi Delta region.

Hushpuckena is a name derived from the Choctaw language purported to mean "sunflowers are abundant". Variant names are "Bland Brake", "Hush-puck-a-haw River", and "Hushpucana River".
