= Tallahaga Creek =

Stream in Mississippi, United States

Coordinates: 32.9137411°N 88.9725581°W

Tallahaga Creek is a stream in the U.S. state of Mississippi.

Tallahaga is a name derived from the Choctaw language meaning "standing rock"; this name was applied to the stream due to a rock formation on its course. Variant names are "Standing Stone Creek", "Talla Haga Creek", "Tallahag Creek", and "Tallahoga Creek".
