= Tillatoba Creek =

Stream in Mississippi, United States

Coordinates: 34.0056690°N 90.1834231°W

Tillatoba Creek is a stream in the U.S. state of Mississippi. It is a tributary to the Tallahatchie River.

Ittillittoba is a name derived from the Choctaw language purported to mean "white dead tree". Variant names are "Ittillittoba Creek", "Middle Tillatoba Creek", and "South Fork Tillatoba Creek".
