= Hobolochitto Creek =

Stream in Mississippi, United States

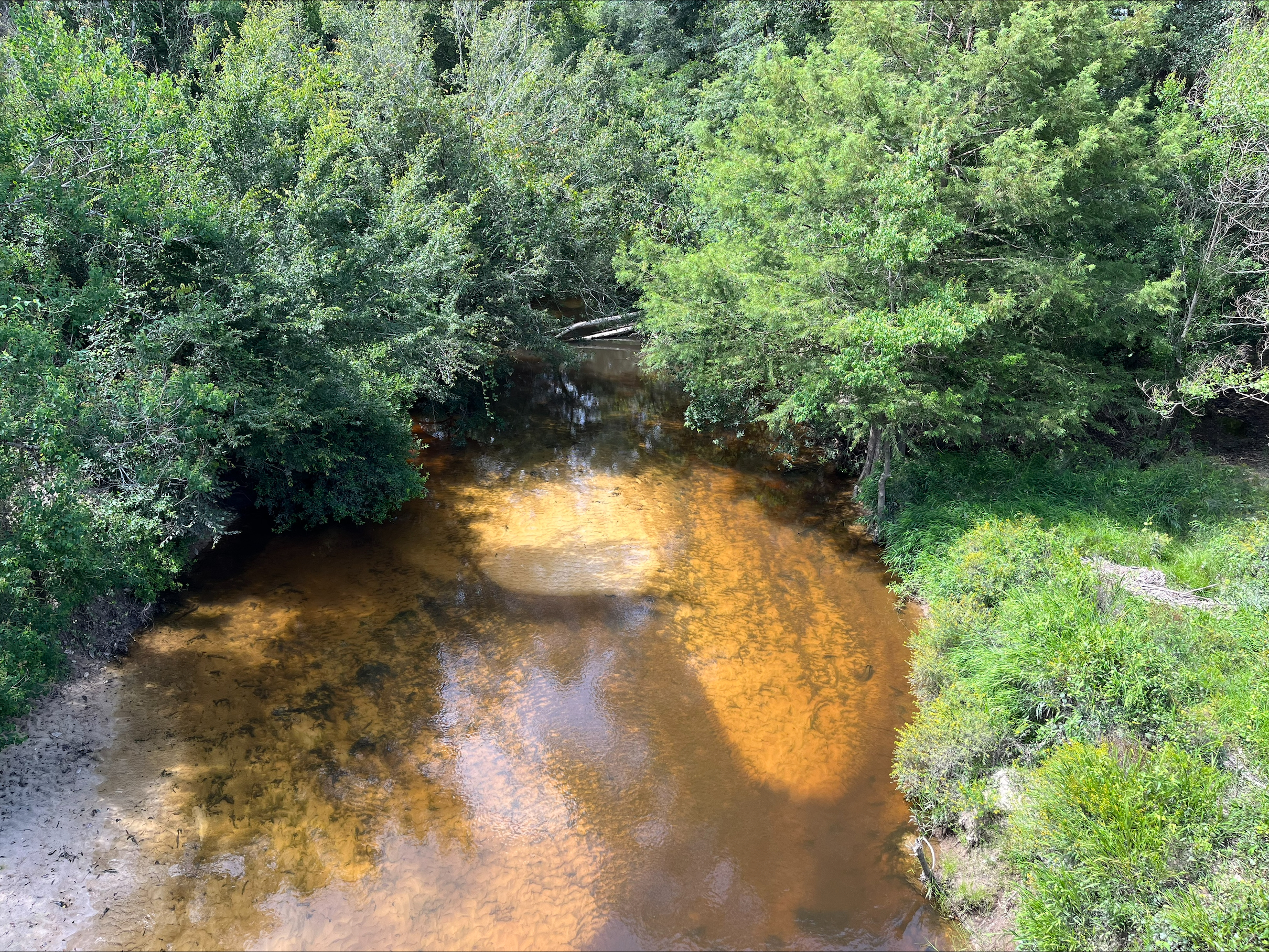
- Hobolochitto Creek in Pearl River County

Location
- Country: United States
- State: Mississippi

Physical characteristics
- Source
  - coordinates: 30.5435977°N 89.6926403°W
- Mouth
  - coordinates: 30.5201988°N 89.7456408°W
- Length: 4.5 mi (7.2 km)

Hobolochitto Creek is a stream in the U.S. state of Mississippi.

Hobolochitto is a name derived from the Choctaw language. Variant names are "Abolo Chitto", "Abolochitto River", "Bola Chitto", "Bolla Chitto", and "Hobolo Chitto".
