= Town Creek (Mississippi) =

River in Mississippi, United States

Coordinates: 33°59′49″N 88°33′12″W

Town Creek, also known as Old Town Creek or West Fork Tombigbee River, is a tributary stream of the Tombigbee River. Its mouth is approximately two miles east of Amory in northeast Mississippi.

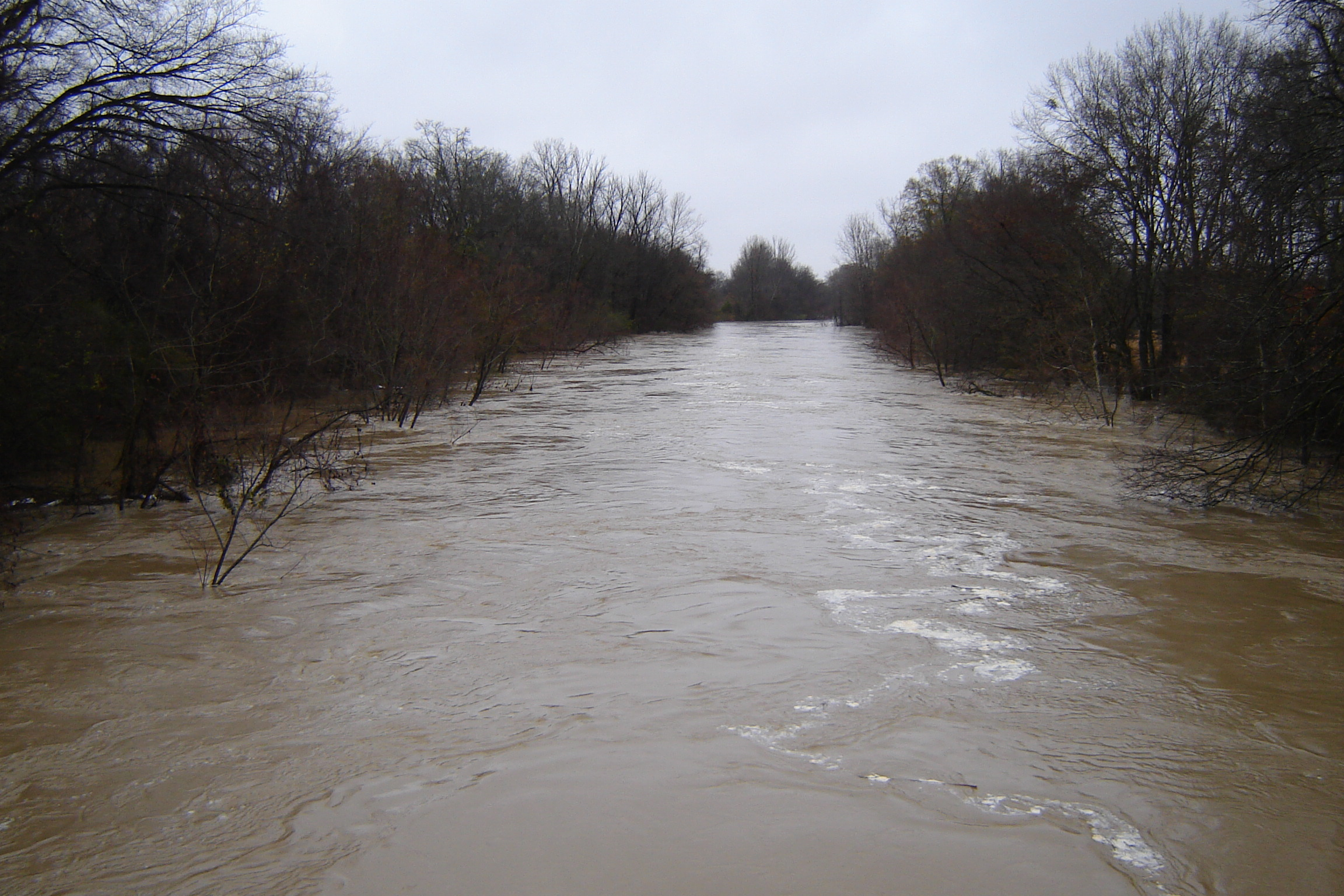
Town Creek at Brewer Rd under bankfull conditions Dec. 10 2008.

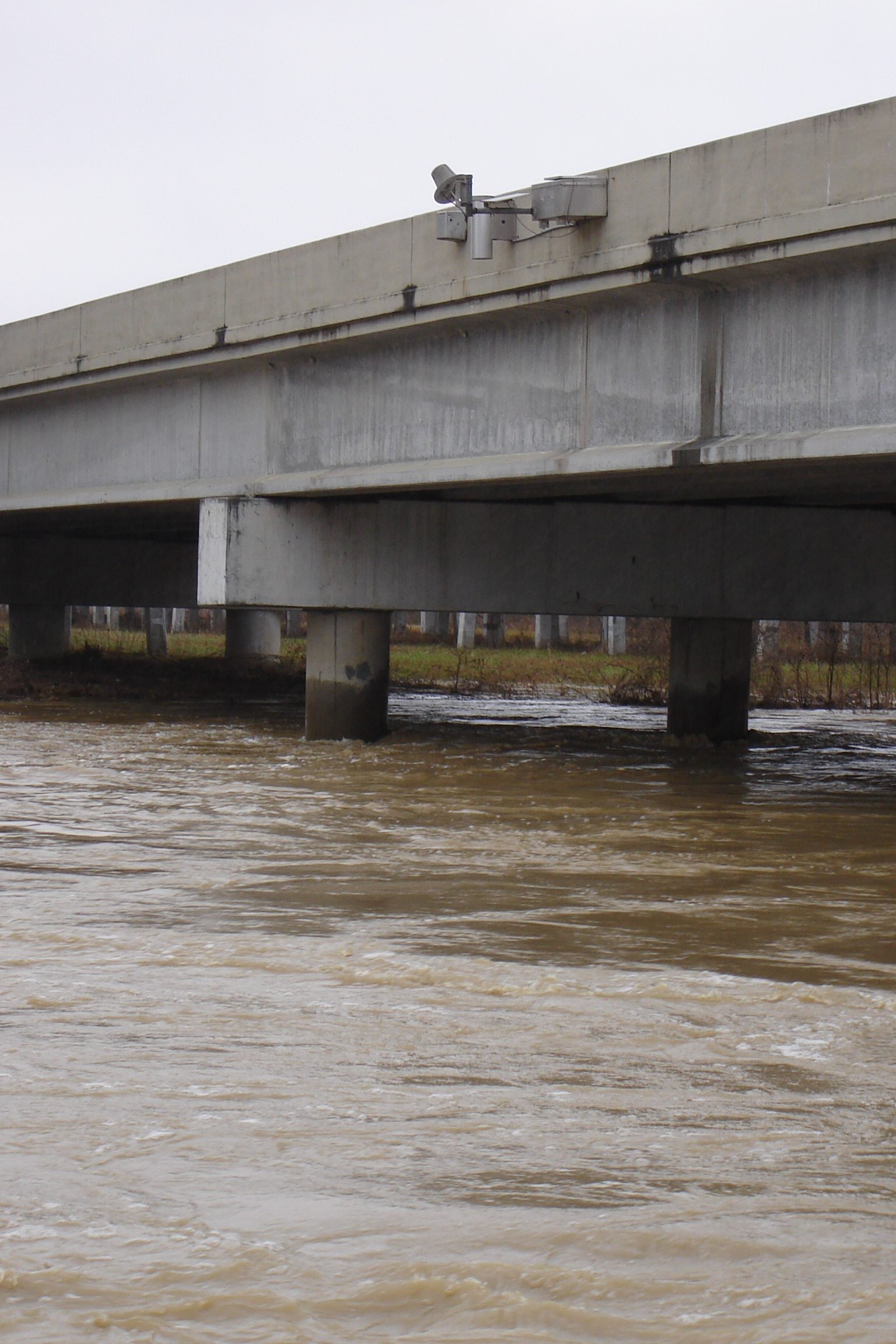
Town Creek at 278 Rd (USGS station)under bankfull conditions (Dec 10 2008)

== See also ==
- List of rivers of Mississippi
