= Yocona River =

Stream in Mississippi, United States

Coordinates: 34.1501110°N 89.8750892°W

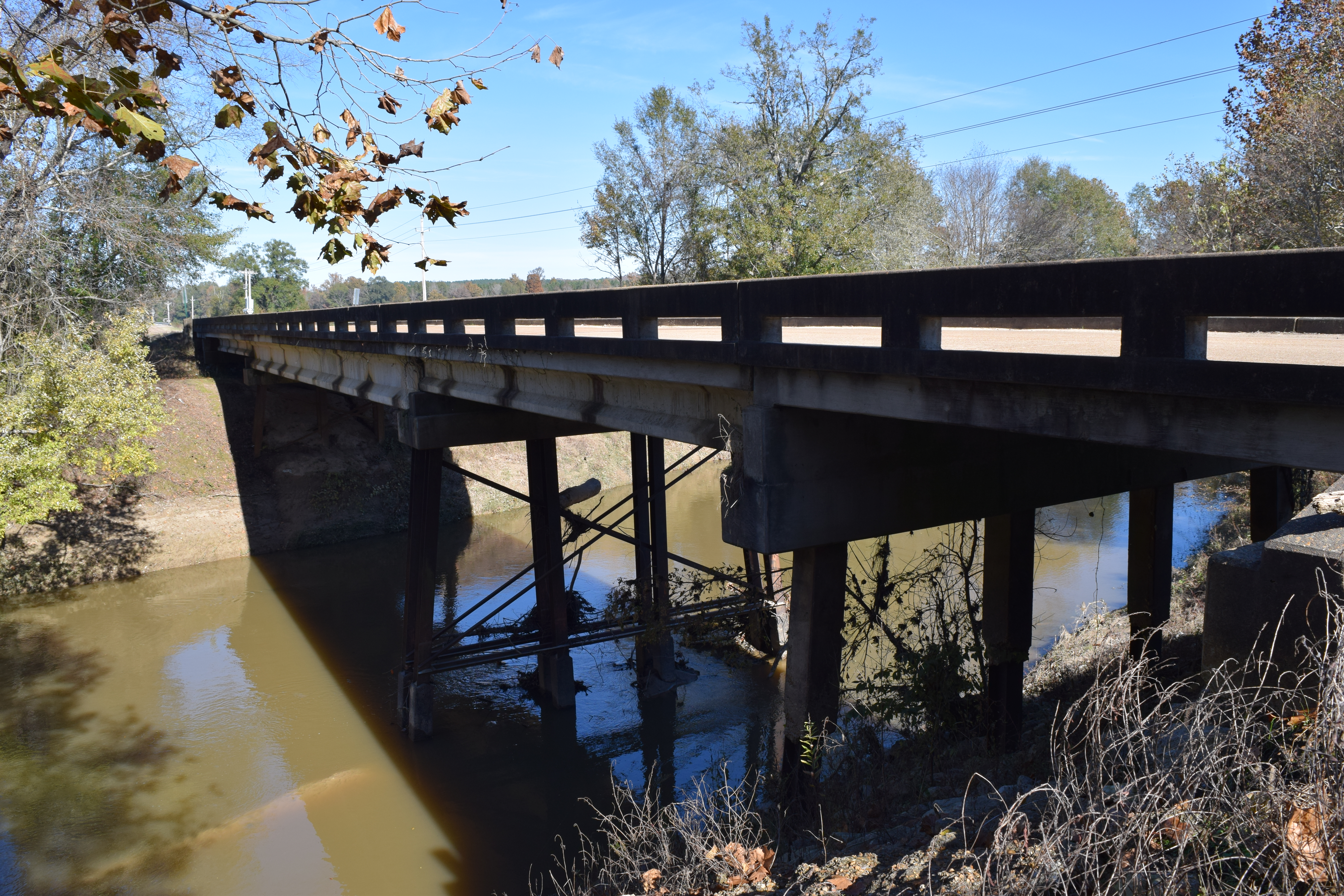
- Bridge over the Yocona River

Location
- Country: United States

Yocona River is a stream in the U.S. state of Mississippi. It is a tributary of the Tallahatchie River.

The fish species Etheostoma faulkneri (Yoknapatawpha darter) is endemic to headwater streams of the Yocona River watershed, being found nowhere else in the world.

In Yalobusha County, the river is impounded by an earthen dam, near the community of Enid, creating Enid Lake, with that lake's waters stretching as far as the town of Water Valley.

== Name ==
Yocona is a name derived from the Chickasaw language meaning "land".

The Board on Geographic Names settled on "Yocona River" as the river's official name and spelling in 1912. According to the Geographic Names Information System, the Yocona River has also been known as:

- Yackoney River
- Yacony Creek
- Yanekney River
- Yocana River
- Yocany River
- Yoccona River
- Yochnapafa Creek
- Yockany River
- Yockhapatalfa River
- Yockinapatapha River
- Yockna River
- Yockney River
- Yocona River Canal
- Yoconie River
- Yohnapatapna River
- Yokoney River

The Yocona River was referred to as the Yoknapatawpha River by William Faulkner.
