= South Tippah Creek =

Stream in Mississippi, United States

Coordinates: 34.7209299°N 89.0586772°W

South Tippah Creek is a stream in the U.S. state of Mississippi. It joins with North Tippah Creek to form the Tippah River.

Tippah is a name derived from the Choctaw language purported to mean "to eat one another", i.e. cannibalism. Variant names are "Little Tippah Creek" and "Tippah Creek".
