= North Tippah Creek =

Stream in Mississippi, United States

Coordinates: 34.7212077°N 89.0589550°W

North Tippah Creek is a stream in the U.S. state of Mississippi. It joins with South Tippah Creek to form the Tippah River.

Tippah is a name derived from the Choctaw language purported to mean "to eat one another", i.e. cannibalism. A variant name is "Tippah Creek".
