= Coffeeville Lock and Dam =

Coffeeville Dam
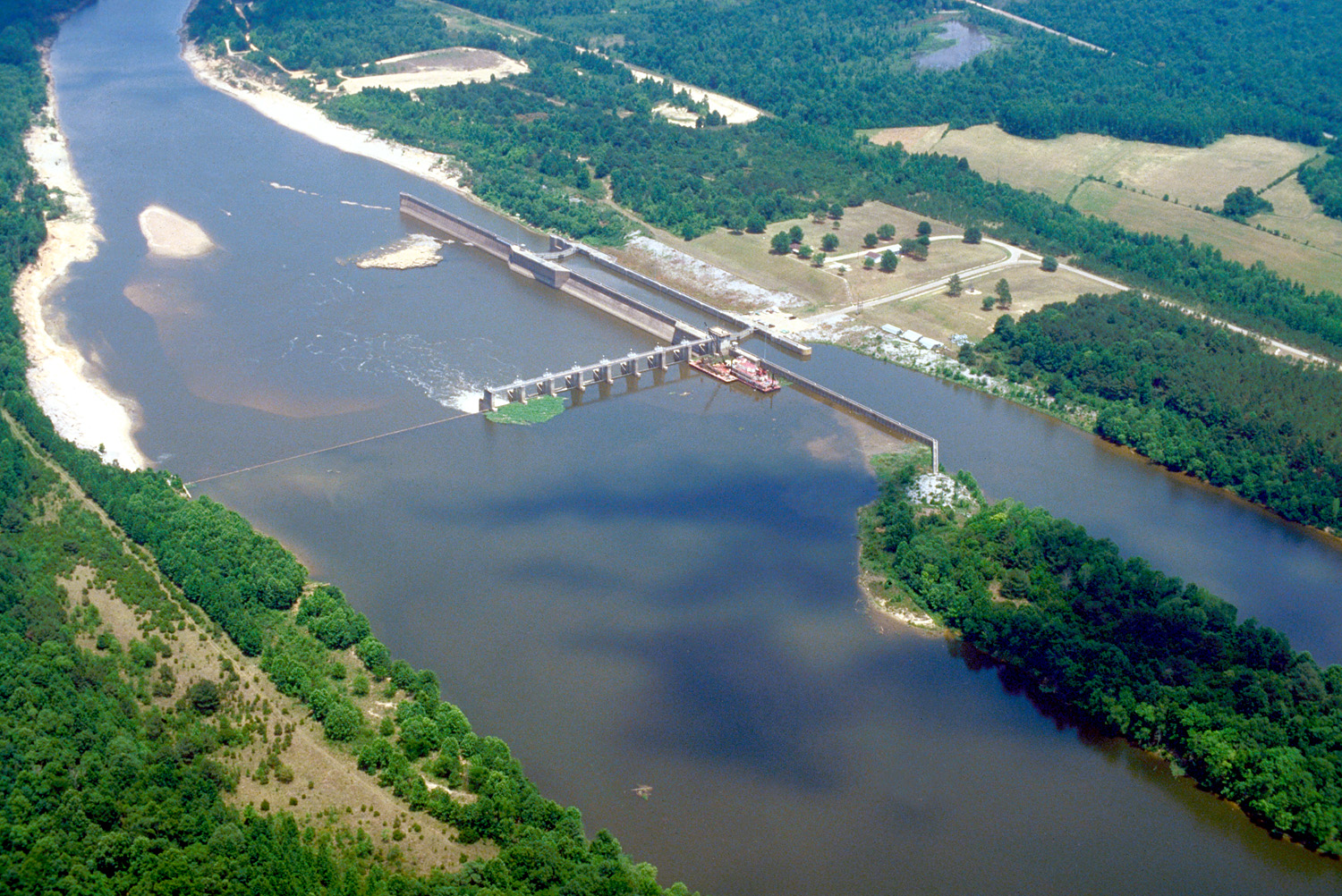
- Coffeeville Lock and Dam

- Location within Alabama
- Country: United States
- Location: Tombigbee River
- Coordinates: 31°45′25.53″N 88°07′44.77″W
- Construction began: 1956
- Opening date: 1965

Coffeeville Lock and Dam are located on the Tombigbee River in Choctaw County, Alabama near the town of Coffeeville operated by the US Army Corps of Engineers. Construction on the lock began in 1956 and while the lock was operational in 1960, all works were not completed until 1965. They were originally known as Jackson Lock and Dam.
