= Noxubee River =

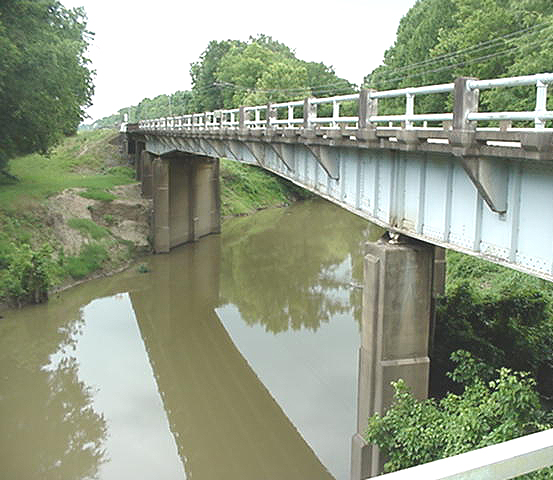
- A bridge crossing of the Noxubee River at Macon, Mississippi

Location
- Country: United States
- State: Alabama and Mississippi

Physical characteristics
- Source
  - coordinates: 33°18′12″N 89°08′51″W
  - elevation: 619 ft (189 m)
- Mouth
  - coordinates: 32°49′42″N 88°10′45″W
  - elevation: 75 ft (23 m)
- Length: 91 mi (146 km)

Basin features
- Progression: Noxubee River → Tombigbee River → Mobile River → Gulf of Mexico
- GNIS ID: 158173

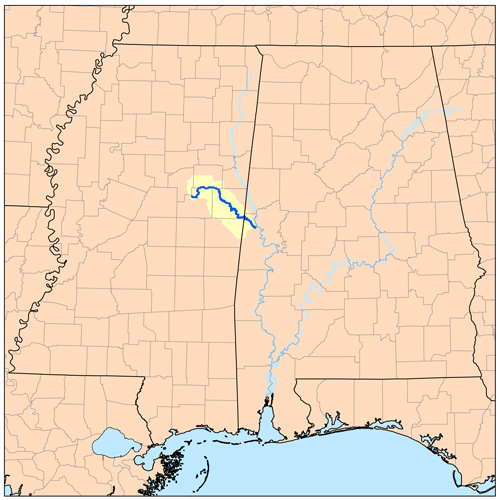

The Noxubee River (NAHKS-uh-bee) is a tributary of the Tombigbee River, about 90.6 miles (145.8 km) long, in east-central Mississippi and west-central Alabama in the United States. Via the Tombigbee, it is part of the watershed of the Mobile River, which flows to the Gulf of Mexico.

== Course ==
The Noxubee rises in Choctaw Lake in the Tombigbee National Forest in Choctaw County, Mississippi, and flows generally southeastwardly through Winston, Oktibbeha and Noxubee Counties in Mississippi, and Sumter County in Alabama, through the Noxubee National Wildlife Refuge and past the town of Macon, Mississippi. It joins the Tombigbee River from the west, about 2 mi (3 km) west of Gainesville, Alabama.

== Name ==
Noxubee is a name derived from the Choctaw language meaning "to stink".

According to the Geographic Names Information System, the Noxubee River has also been known as:

- Hachcha Osi River
- Hatch Oose River
- Hatcha River
- Hatchaoose River
- Hatche Oose River
- Hatchoose River
- Nooksabba River
- Noxaby Creek
- Noxiby River
- Noxshubby River
- Noxube River
- Noxuby Creek
- Oaknoxaby River
- Oaknoxubee River
- Ohanexubee River
- Oka Noxubee
- Oka Onoxubba River
- Okanoxubee River
- Okenoxubbee River
- Okenoxubee River
- Olamoyubee River
- Ruisseau Nachebe Tchitou River

== See also ==
- List of Alabama rivers
- List of Mississippi rivers
