= Bayou Talla (Jourdan River tributary) =

Stream in Mississippi, United States

Coordinates: 30°23′51″N 89°25′33″W

Bayou Talla is a stream in Hancock County, Mississippi, United States, that is a tributary of the Jourdan River.

Talla is a name derived from the Choctaw language meaning "palmetto".

== See also ==
- List of rivers in Mississippi
