= Buckatunna Creek =

Stream in Alabama and Mississippi, United States

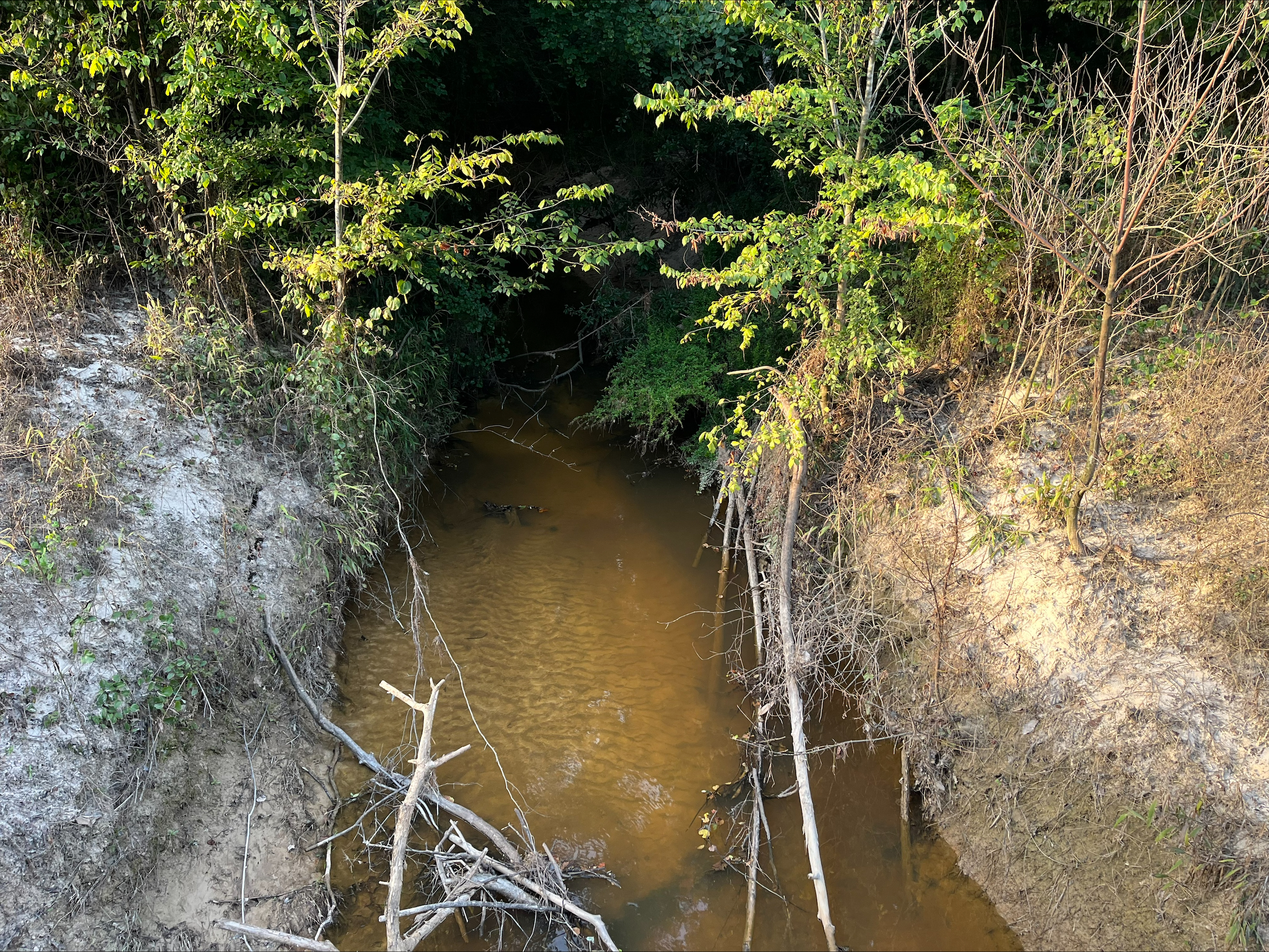
- Buckatunna Creek near its source in Lauderdale County, Mississippi

Location
- Country: United States
- State: Mississippi

Physical characteristics
- Source
  - coordinates: 32.3829195°N 88.5555949°W
- Mouth
  - coordinates: 31.5073871°N 88.5378047°W
- Length: 60 mi (97 km)
- Basin size: 505 sq mi (1,310 km^{2})

Buckatunna Creek is a stream in the U.S. state of Mississippi. It is a tributary to the Chickasawhay River.

Buckatunna Creek is a name derived from the Choctaw language meaning "creek at which there is weaving". Variant names are "Bucatunna Creek", "Buckatanna Creek", "Buckatanne River", "Buckatanny Creek", "Buckatonna Creek", "Buckhatannee Creek", and "Puckatunna Creek".

The creek lends its name to the community of Buckatunna, Mississippi.

Some of the earliest settlers in Wayne County settled along Buckatunna Creek.

In September 1889, Rube Burrow robbed a train on a railroad bridge over Buckatunna Creek.
