= Biloxi River =

Stream in Mississippi, U.S.

Coordinates: 30°25′14″N 88°58′46″W

The Biloxi River is a stream in the U.S. state of Mississippi.

The Biloxi River is named for the Biloxi Indians, but the ultimate meaning of the word "Biloxi" is obscure. Variant names are "Oka Chambala River" and "Viloxy River".
