= Tibbee Creek =

Stream in Mississippi, United States

Coordinates: 33.5003970°N 88.4861536°W

Tibbee Creek is a stream in the U.S. state of Mississippi.

Tibbee is a name derived from the Choctaw language purported to mean "icy water". Variant names are "Oktibbeha Creek", "Tibbee River", and "Tibby Creek".
