= Bogue Homo (Leaf River tributary) =

Stream in Mississippi

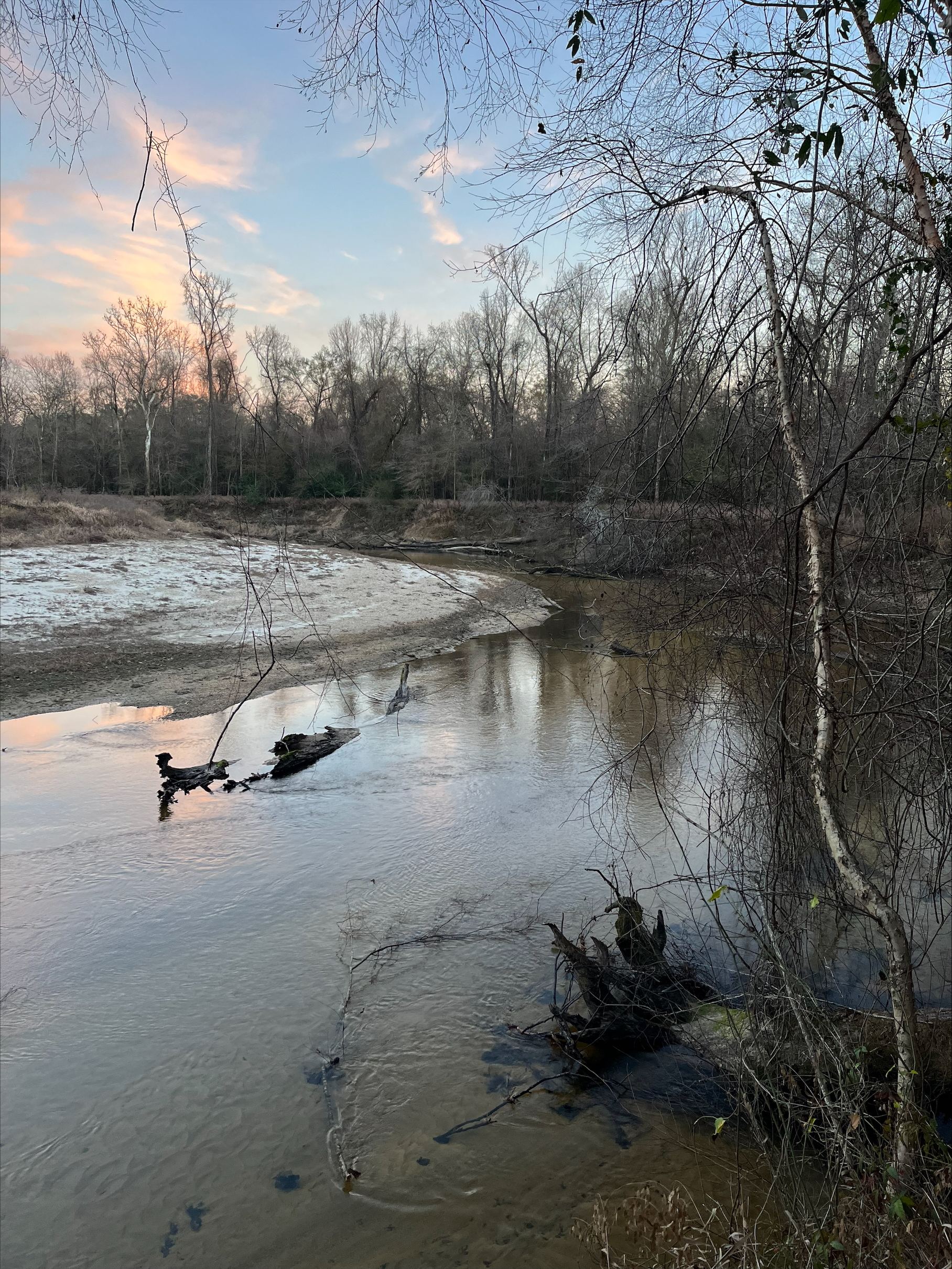
- Bogue Homo in Perry County

Location
- Country: United States
- State: Mississippi

Physical characteristics
- Source
  - coordinates: 31.814441°N 89.002243°W
- Mouth
  - coordinates: 31.233364°N 88.998562°W
- Length: 40.12 mi (64.57 km)
- Basin size: 344 mi^{2} (890 km^{2})

Bogue Homo is a stream in the U.S. state of Mississippi. It is a tributary to the Leaf River.

== Name ==
Bogue Homo is a name derived from the Choctaw language meaning "red creek".

Variant names are:

- Big Bogue Homo Creek
- Boaghoma
- Bogahoma
- Bogohoma
- Bogue Homa
- Bogue Home Creek
- Bogue Homo Creek
- Bogueahoma
- Boguehoma
- Boguehomo
