= Tallahala Creek =

Stream in Mississippi, United States

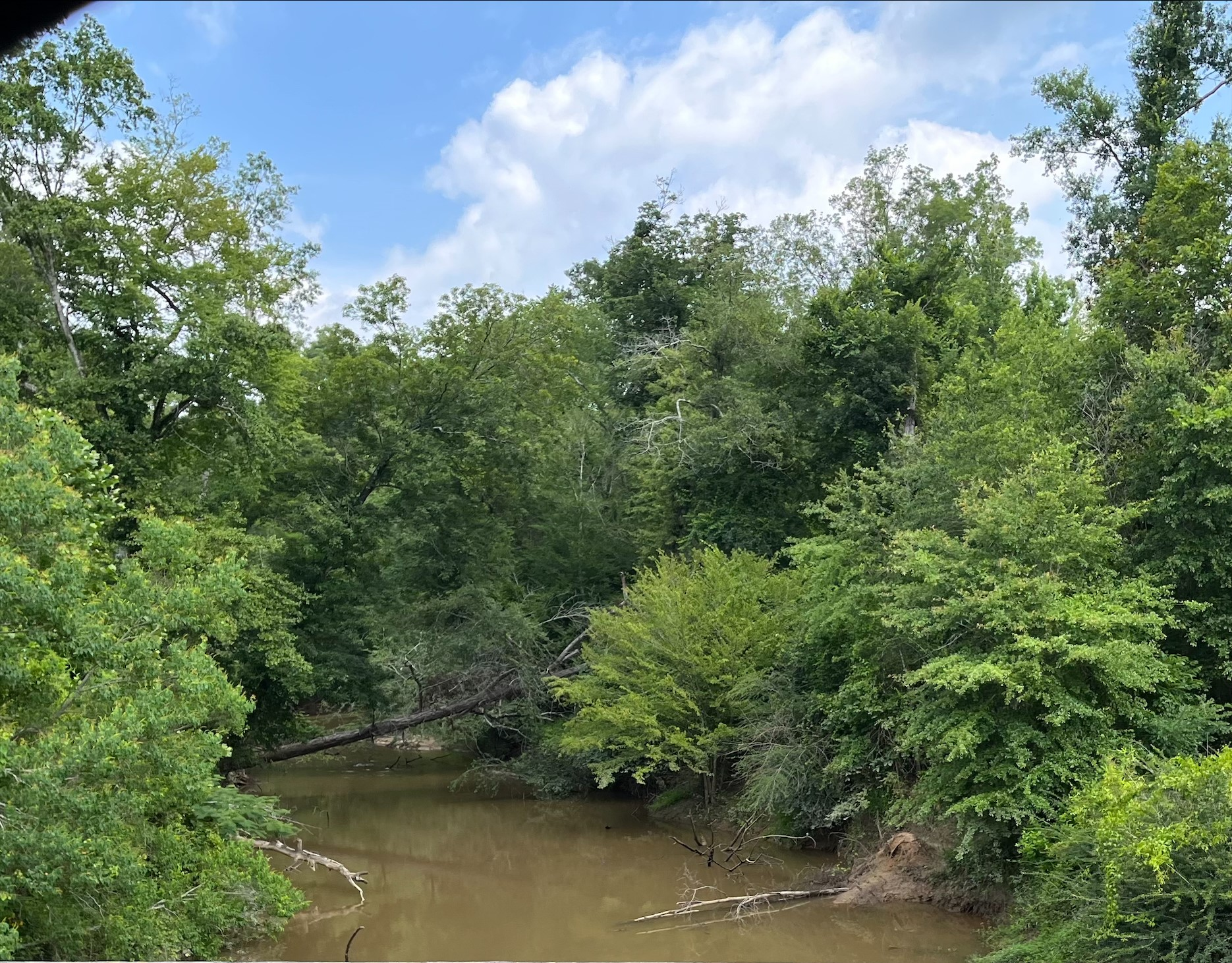
- Tallahala Creek in Jones County

Location
- Country: United States
- State: Mississippi

Physical characteristics
- Source
  - coordinates: 32.1768146°N 89.1506147°W
- Mouth
  - coordinates: 31.2265689°N 89.0800541°W
- Length: 65 mi (105 km)
- Basin size: 238 sq mi (620 km^{2})

Tallahala Creek is a river in the southeast part of the U.S. state of Mississippi. It flows from north to south, joining the Leaf River east of Hattiesburg near the town of New Augusta in Perry County.

== Names ==
Tallahala is a name derived from the Choctaw language purported to mean "standing rocks".

According to the Geographic Names Information System, Tallahala Creek has also been known as:

- East Tallahala Creek
- Fiume Tale Houma
- Hashlupbacher Creek
- Hashlupbatcher Creek
- Hashluphatcher Creek
- Hooma Creek
- Talahala Creek
- Talahola Creek
- Talla Creek
- Talla Halla Creek
- Tallahala River
- Tallahalah Creek
- Tallahalie Creek
- Tallahalla Creek
- Tallahalla River
- Tallahoma Creek
- Tallahuta Creek
- Tallee Hooma River
- Tallyhomo River
- West Fork Tallahala Creek
