= Pascagoula River =

River in southeastern Mississippi, US

Coordinates: 30°45′18″N 88°40′01″W

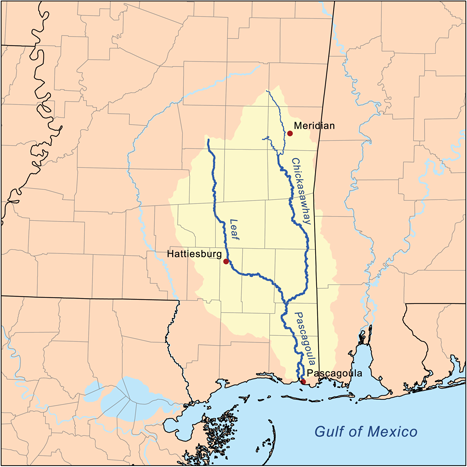

The Pascagoula River is a river, about 80 miles (130 km) long, in southeastern Mississippi in the United States. The river drains an area of about 8,800 square miles (23,000 km^{2}) and flows into Mississippi Sound of the Gulf of Mexico. The Pascagoula River Basin is managed by the Pat Harrison Waterway District.

== History ==
It is significant as the only unaffected (or nearly so) river with a discharge of over 10 cubic kilometres (2.4 mi^{3}) per year flowing from the United States into the Gulf of Mexico, and indeed the only one in the Cfa Köppen climate classification zone anywhere in the world, with the nearest approaches being the Juquiá and Itajaí in southeastern Brazil (The Yuan Jiang and Shinano Gawa are comparable to those Brazilian rivers but are only marginally in the Cfa zone). As a result, the Pascagoula has, in modern times, been the focus of a great deal of effort regarding its conservation to prevent the construction of dams on it.

The water district manager has proposed the construction of a couple of dams on tributaries called the Big and the Little Cedar creeks to manage the river's flow during a drought crisis. Since 1999 the water level in the river has fallen as low as 1.15 ft (on September 6, 2015) and 0.2 ft (October 8, 2000), as measured at the Graham Ferry gauge.

George and Jackson counties, the two counties closest to the Gulf, have two separate wildlife management areas called Water trails that provide controlled recreation such as camping, birding, or canoeing.

In 2023, the Eric Clark Coastal Preserve was opened, and it includes hiking trails near the Pascagoula River.

== Course ==
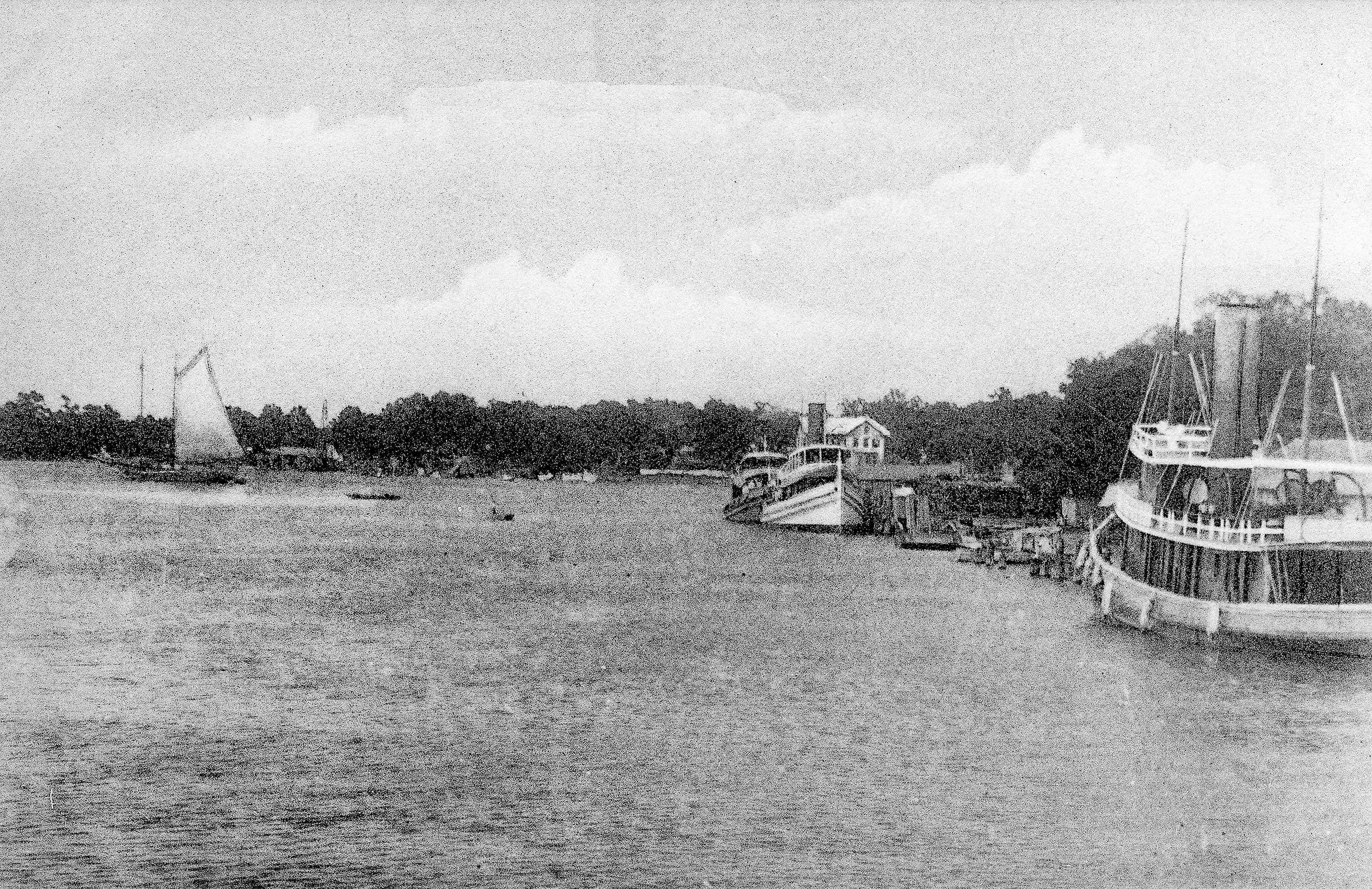
Pascagoula River at Pascagoula, Mississippi, circa 1900

The Pascagoula River is formed in northwestern George County, just north of the Merrill community, by the confluence of the Leaf and Chickasawhay Rivers and flows generally southward through swampy bottomlands in George and Jackson Counties. In its lower course the river forms several channels and bayous; its largest such distributary is the West Pascagoula River, which flows into the Mississippi Sound at Gautier. The main channel passes Escatawpa and Moss Point and flows into the sound at Pascagoula. At low water the tidal effects are felt more than forty miles upstream.

== Name ==
Pascagoula is a name derived from the Choctaw language meaning "bread people".

According to the Geographic Names Information System, the river has also been known as:

- East Pascagoula River (below the branching off the West Pascagoula River)
- Fiume Pescagoula
- Pasca Oocooloo River
- Pascoboula River
- Paska Okla River
- Paspagola River
- Pasquagola River
- Rio de Pascagula
- Riviere des Pascagoula
- Riviere des Pascagoulas
- Singing River (lower 8 miles of the river)

== History ==
According to local Euro-American legend, the peace-loving Pascagoula tribe walked single file into the Singing River because the local Biloxi tribe were planning to attack. Anola, a Biloxi "princess", eloped with the Pascagoula chief Altama, although she was engaged to a Biloxi chieftain. Anola's angry would-be husband led his soldiers into battle with the Pascagoula. Outnumbered and fearing enslavement by the Biloxi, the tribe joined hands and walked into the river singing a death song. This section of the Pascagoula River became known as the "Singing River" because of this death song, which reportedly can still be heard at night.

== See also ==
- List of Mississippi rivers
- Pascagoula Abduction
- South Atlantic-Gulf Water Resource Region
