= Tippah River =

Stream in Mississippi, United States

Coordinates: 34.5309356°N 89.4123004°W

Tippah River is a stream in the U.S. state of Mississippi. It is a tributary of the Tallahatchie River.

Tippah is a name derived from the Choctaw language purported to mean "to eat one another", i.e. cannibalism. Variant names are "Tippah Creek" and Tippah River Canal".
