= Chickasawhay River =

River in Mississippi, United States

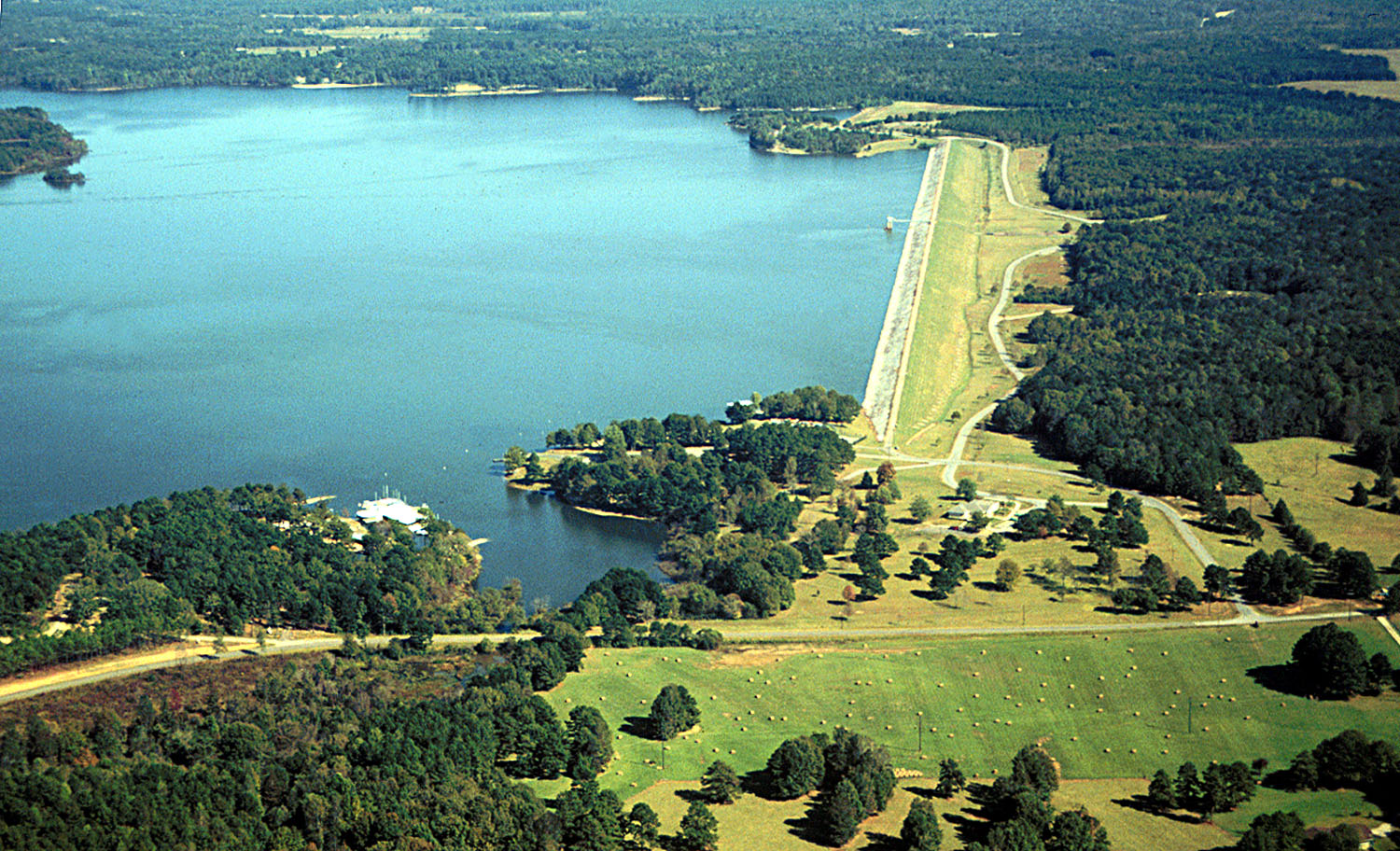

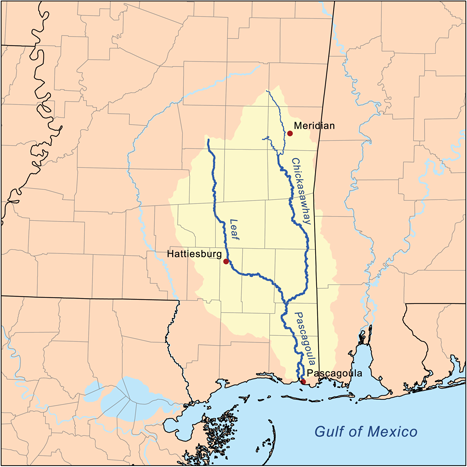
- Map of the Pascagoula River and watershed

Physical characteristics
- Source
  - location: Confluence of Okatibbee Creek and Chunky River in Clarke County, Mississippi
  - coordinates: 32°10′58″N 88°49′19″W
  - elevation: 244 ft (74 m)
- Mouth
  - location: Confluence with the Leaf River forming the Pascagoula River
  - coordinates: 30°58′57″N 88°43′49″W
  - elevation: 43 ft (13 m)
- Length: 210 mi (340 km)

Basin features
- Progression: Chickasawhay River → Pascagoula River → Gulf of Mexico
- GNIS ID: 692890

The Chickasawhay River is a river about 210 miles (340 km) long in southeastern Mississippi in the United States. It is a principal tributary of the Pascagoula River that flows to the Gulf of Mexico. The Chickasawhay's tributaries also drain a portion of western Alabama. The name "Chickasawhay" comes from the Choctaw word chikashsha-ahi, literally "Chickasaw potato".

== Geology ==
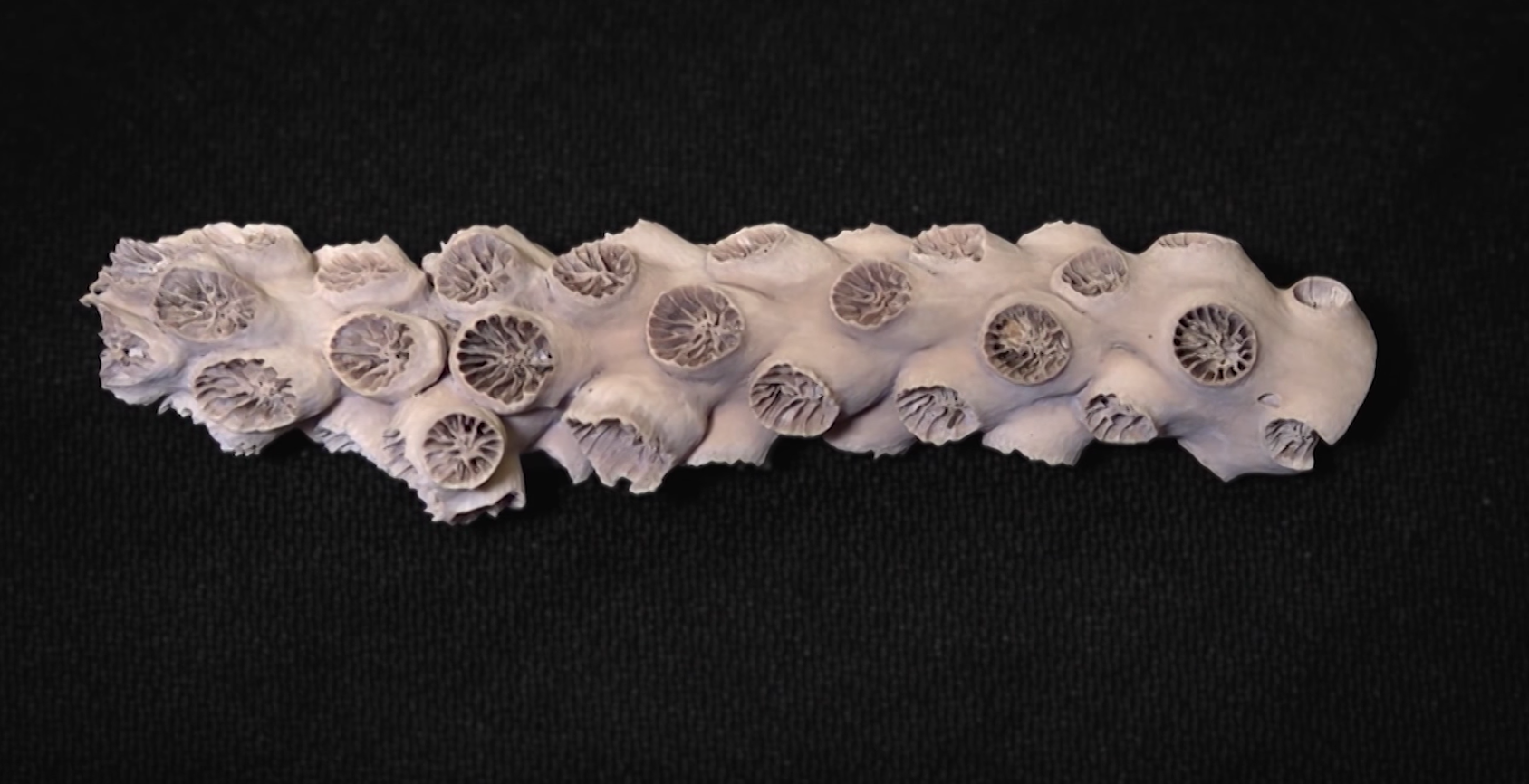
Chickasawhay Coral Fossil

The Chickasawhay River is known for its abundant fossil deposits, placed over a period of 35 million years. Mark Puckett, Chairman of the Department of Geography and Geology at the University of Southern Mississippi, has studied the area for years. According to Puckett, many species of fossils from the river were the first of their kind to be studied anywhere on earth. Some sealife fossils that are now found worldwide were first discovered in deposits along this river from a period when it was part of the sea. Some species are named for local towns and landmarks.

== See also ==
- List of rivers of Mississippi
