= Earl A. Cuevas =

Earl Alphonse Cuevas (July 28, 1897 - September 8, 1992) was the Poet Laureate of Mississippi and founder of the Poet Laureate League, a national lobbying group which advocated for the establishment of poet laureate positions in the United States in the 1930s. Cuevas also wrote under the pen name Carl Cave.

== Personal life ==
Earl Alphonse Cuevas was born July 28, 1897, in Kiln, Mississippi to George A. Cuevas and Cornelia Mann. He had 8 siblings. He graduated from the University of California, University of Detroit, and Soule College. He worked in the traffic department of the National Recovery Administration in Washington, D.C. He passed away in Jackson, Mississippi on September 8, 1992, at the age of 95.

== Poet Laureate League of America ==
On August 26, 1932 Cuevas organized the Poet Laureate League of America in Washington D.C. The organization's mission was to advocate for a national poet laureate, state poets laureate, income stipends and patrons to financially sponsor poets, housing for poets, and create a national museum to honor American poets.

Cuevas advocated for the establishment of a wage code, standardizing pay for poets, through the National Recovery Administration. He sought out properties for clubhouse space, museums, and communal housing for poets. He wanted to establish a housing colony for poets in Virginia at Mount Weather, where poets could live and write while being subsidized by government funding. He advocated for a federal poetry project that would guarantee poets a weekly salary, promote their works in the press and broadcast them on radio, and academic settings.

Cuevas appeared before Congress on April 25, 1935, in favor of the creation of a Department of Science, Arts, and Literature. He spoke of the economic struggles of poets, his organizing efforts to turn poetry into a profitable industry, and advocated for better working conditions and pay for poets. He advocated for a national poet laureate position, and spoke of the Poet Laureate League's selection process for state poets laureate.

On February 28, 1938 He testified before a Senate subcommittee in 1938 in favor of S. 3269 in favor of a Bureau of Fine Arts, representing around 400 poets across the United States who had membership in the Poet Laureate League. He spoke of the impoverished conditions that poets lived in, the lack of a profitable career path, and lack of recognition for contemporary living poets at the time.

The organization's membership elected the following to serve as poets laureate for their state:

- Anthony Ferdinand Klinkner, Poet Laureate of Iowa (1933)
- Margarette Ball Dickson, Poet Laureate of Minnesota (1934)
- Earl A. Cuevas, Poet Laureate of Mississippi (1935)
- Susan Louise Marsh, Poet Laureate of Missouri (1933)
- Benjamin Francis Musser, Poet Laureate of New Jersey (1934)
- Dr. Joseph R. Halstead aka Dom Placid Kleppel, Poet Laureate of North Carolina (1935)
- Mabel Bear Posegate, Poet Laureate of Ohio (1936)
- Julious Caesar Hill, Poet Laureate of Oklahoma (1939)
- Ralph Cheyney, Poet Laureate of Pennsylvania (1934)

== Poetry ==
- "A Call to Mississippi," The Winona Times, July 3, 1925
- "To the South," Biloxi Sun-Herald, July 11, 1930
- "The Dying Muse", Hearings before the Committee on Patents, 74th Congress, April 15, 1935
- "The Revolt of the Muses", Congressional Record, 86th Congress, March 23, 1959
- "New Iberia," The Daily Iberian, August 21, 1957
