= Collinsville, Mississippi =

- Census-designated place
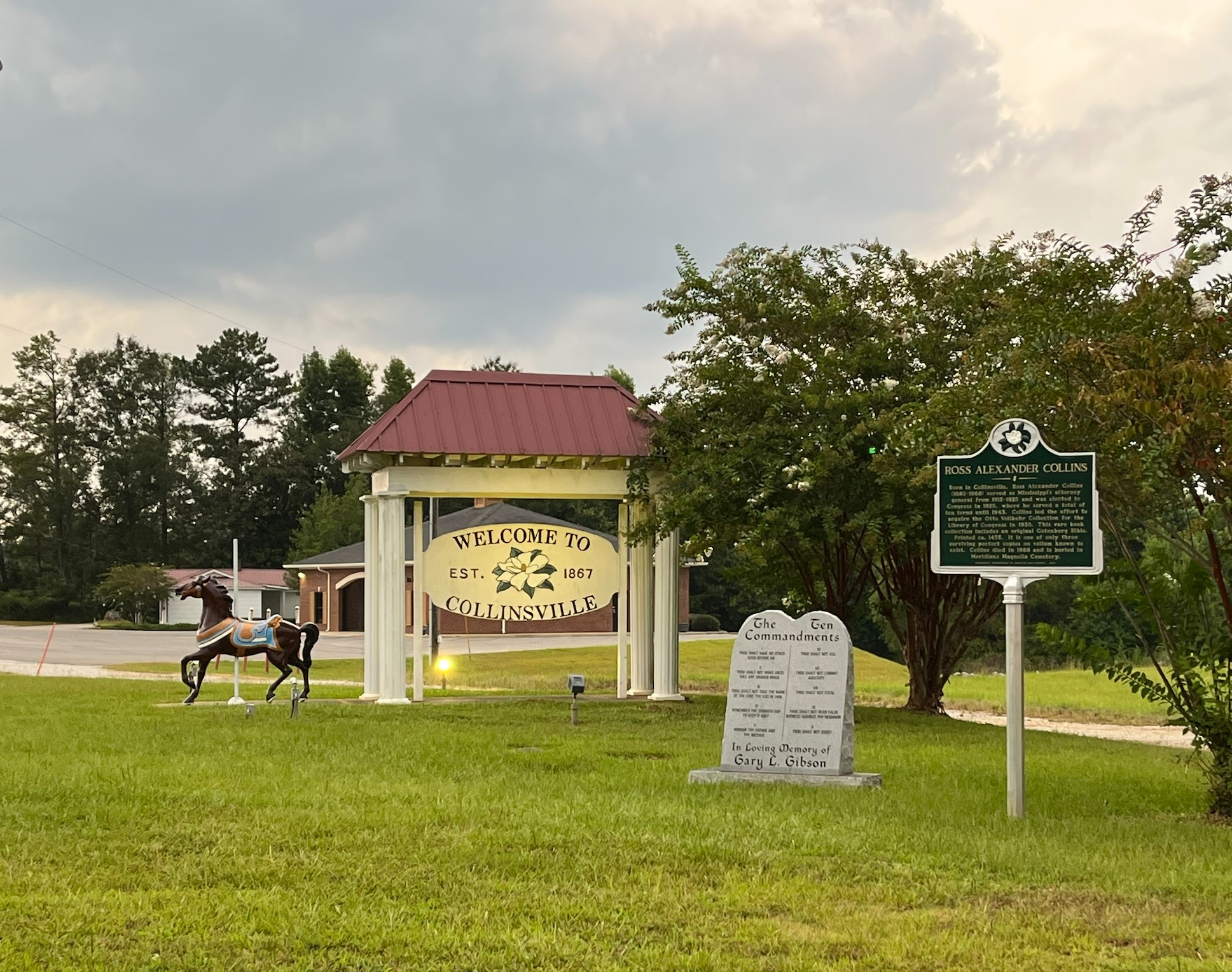
- Collinsville Welcome Sign

- Location of Collinsville, Mississippi
- Coordinates: 32°29′16″N 88°50′39″W
- Country: United States
- State: Mississippi
- County: Lauderdale

Area
  - Total: 14.27 sq mi (36.97 km^{2})
  - Land: 14.25 sq mi (36.90 km^{2})
  - Water: 0.027 sq mi (0.07 km^{2})
- Elevation: 463 ft (141 m)

Population (2020)
  - Total: 1,984
  - Density: 139.2/sq mi (53.76/km^{2})
- Time zone: UTC-6 (Central (CST))
  - Summer (DST): UTC-5 (CDT)
- ZIP code: 39325
- Area code: 601
- FIPS code: 28-15180
- GNIS feature ID: 0668706

Collinsville is an unincorporated community and census-designated place (CDP) in Lauderdale County, Mississippi, United States. The population was 1,984 at the 2020 census.

== Geography ==
Collinsville is located in northwestern Lauderdale County at 32°29′16″N 88°50′39″W (32.487906, -88.844205). Mississippi Highway 19 passes through the community, leading southeast 13 miles (21 km) to Meridian, the county seat, and northwest 26 miles (42 km) to Philadelphia.

According to the United States Census Bureau, the CDP has a total area of 14.3 square miles (37.0 km^{2}), of which 0.03 square miles (0.07 km^{2}), or 0.18%, are water. The town and Highway 19 lie on a low ridge separating Suqualena Creek to the west and Twitley Branch to the east, both of which are tributaries of Okatibbee Creek and part of the Chickasawhay/Pascagoula River watershed. Okatibbee Dam, forming 5.9-square-mile (15 km^{2}) Okatibbee Lake, is at the eastern edge of the Collinsville CDP.

== Demographics ==
Historical population
Census	Pop.	Note	%±
1990	1,364		—
2000	1,823		33.7%
2010	1,948		6.9%
2020	1,984		1.8%
U.S. Decennial Census

=== Racial and ethnic composition ===
Collinsville CDP, Mississippi – Racial and ethnic composition Note: the US Census treats Hispanic/Latino as an ethnic category. This table excludes Latinos from the racial categories and assigns them to a separate category. Hispanics/Latinos may be of any race.
Race / Ethnicity (NH = Non-Hispanic)	Pop 2000	Pop 2010	Pop 2020	% 2000	% 2010	% 2020
White alone (NH)	1,555	1,628	1,532	85.30%	83.57%	77.22%
Black or African American alone (NH)	228	254	303	12.51%	13.04%	15.27%
Native American or Alaska Native alone (NH)	0	1	0	0.00%	0.05%	0.00%
Asian alone (NH)	7	12	14	0.38%	0.62%	0.71%
Native Hawaiian or Pacific Islander alone (NH)	0	0	2	0.00%	0.00%	0.10%
Other race alone (NH)	0	0	4	0.00%	0.00%	0.20%
Mixed race or Multiracial (NH)	9	16	59	0.49%	0.82%	2.97%
Hispanic or Latino (any race)	24	37	70	1.32%	1.90%	3.53%
Total	1,823	1,948	1,984	100.00%	100.00%	100.00%

=== 2020 census ===
As of the 2020 census, Collinsville had a population of 1,984. There were 773 households and 503 families residing in the CDP.

The median age was 40.0 years. 24.3% of residents were under the age of 18 and 16.9% of residents were 65 years of age or older. For every 100 females there were 87.7 males, and for every 100 females age 18 and over there were 86.6 males age 18 and over.

0.0% of residents lived in urban areas, while 100.0% lived in rural areas.

Of households in Collinsville, 28.8% had children under the age of 18 living in them. Of all households, 55.9% were married-couple households, 14.4% were households with a male householder and no spouse or partner present, and 25.0% were households with a female householder and no spouse or partner present. About 23.1% of all households were made up of individuals and 11.4% had someone living alone who was 65 years of age or older.

There were 825 housing units, of which 6.3% were vacant. The homeowner vacancy rate was 1.5% and the rental vacancy rate was 6.1%.

=== 2000 census ===
As of the 2000 census, there were 1,823 people, 701 households, and 541 families residing in the CDP. The population density was 115.7 inhabitants per square mile (44.7/km^{2}). There were 739 housing units at an average density of 46.9 units per square mile (18.1 units/km^{2}). The racial makeup of the CDP was 86.56% White, 12.51% African American, 0.38% Asian, and 0.55% from two or more races. Hispanic or Latino of any race were 1.32% of the population.

There were 701 households, out of which 39.2% had children under the age of 18 living with them, 63.9% were married couples living together, 10.3% had a female householder with no husband present, and 22.8% were non-families. 21.4% of all households were made up of individuals, and 9.7% had someone living alone who was 65 years of age or older. The average household size was 2.60 and the average family size was 3.03.

In the CDP the population was spread out, with 26.8% under the age of 18, 6.4% from 18 to 24, 31.2% from 25 to 44, 23.3% from 45 to 64, and 12.4% who were 65 years of age or older. The median age was 36 years. For every 100 females there were 100.1 males. For every 100 females age 18 and over, there were 91.9 males.

The median income for a household in the CDP was $33,476, and the median income for a family was $41,714. Males had a median income of $31,779 versus $21,957 for females. The per capita income for the CDP was $17,184. About 5.4% of families and 8.9% of the population were below the poverty line, including 7.2% of those under age 18 and 20.5% of those age 65 or over.

== Notable people ==
- Lane Burroughs, college baseball coach
- Ross A. Collins, congressman from Mississippi
- Austin Davis, former NFL quarterback
- Winifred Hamrick Farrar, Mississippi's poet laureate from 1978 to 2010
- Jennifer Gambatese, actress and singer
- Jimmy Ruffin, soul and R&B singer
