= Marion, Mississippi =

- Town
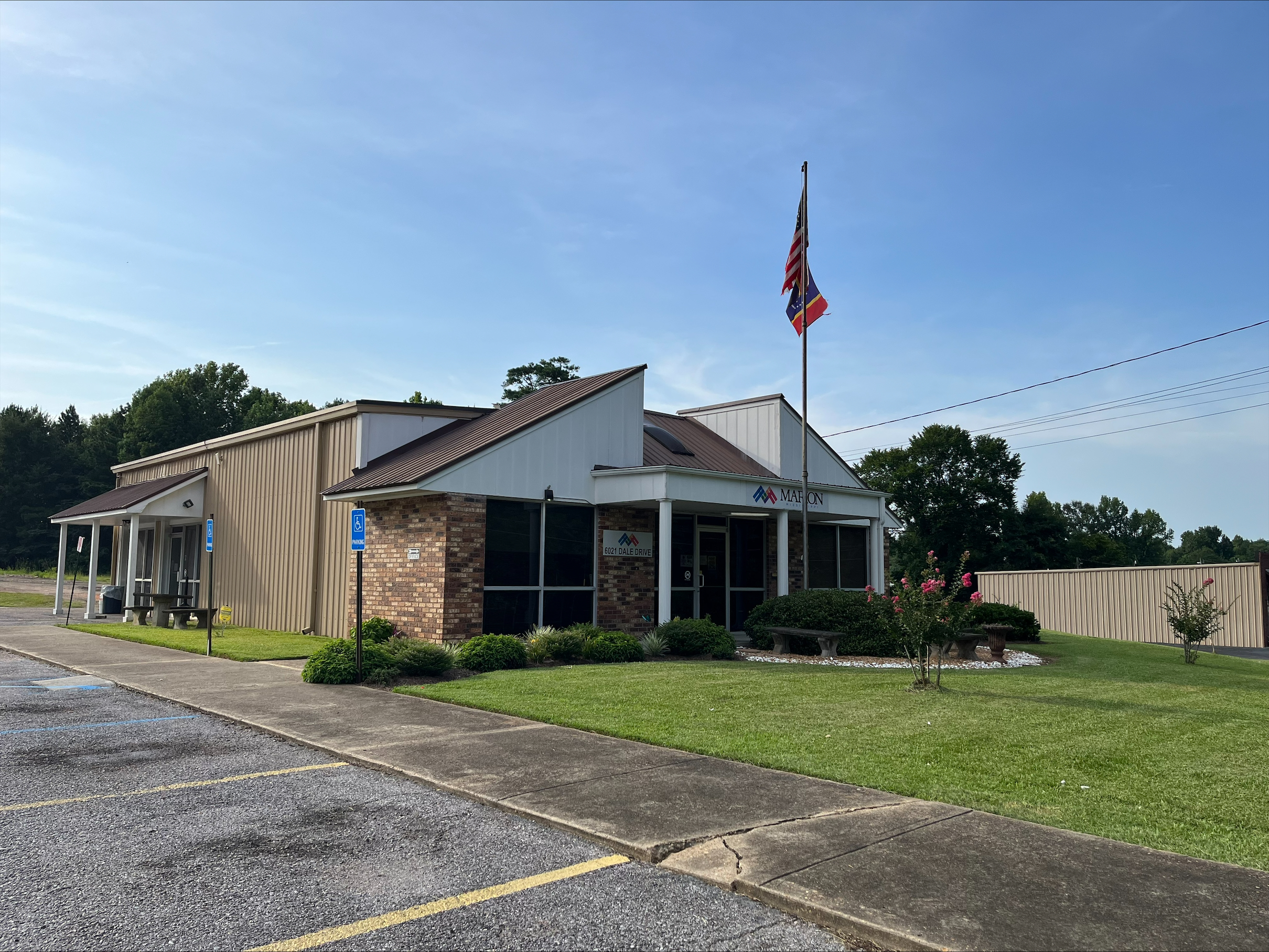
- Marion Town Hall and police station

- Flag Logo

- Location of Marion, Mississippi

- Location in the United States
- Coordinates: 32°25′20″N 88°38′50″W
- Country: United States
- State: Mississippi
- County: Lauderdale

Area
  - Total: 3.62 sq mi (9.38 km^{2})
  - Land: 3.61 sq mi (9.36 km^{2})
  - Water: 0.0077 sq mi (0.02 km^{2})
- Elevation: 367 ft (112 m)

Population (2020)
  - Total: 1,751
  - Density: 484.5/sq mi (187.07/km^{2})
- Time zone: UTC-6 (Central (CST))
  - Summer (DST): UTC-5 (CDT)
- ZIP code: 39342
- Area code: 601
- FIPS code: 28-45160
- GNIS feature ID: 0673135
- Website: www.marionms.org

Marion is a town in Lauderdale County, Mississippi, United States. It is a northeastern suburb of Meridian, the county seat. As of the 2020 census, Marion had a population of 1,751.

== History ==
The town was named for Francis Marion, a military leader known as the "Swamp Fox". Marion was Lauderdale County's seat from its founding to Reconstruction. Prior to the war, Marion was a prosperous town inhabited by numerous planters and enslaved African Americans. In 1840, it had a drugstore, two blacksmith shops, six dry goods stores, and two academies (one for girls and another for boys). It also had at least one newspaper, the Lauderdale Republican.

In 1850, Congress donated land to Alabama and Mississippi in order to build the Mobile & Ohio Railroad, which bypassed Marion and constructed a station two miles to the southwest in a village called McLemore's Old Field (now the city of Meridian). During the 1850s, land values in Lauderdale County increased by 176 percent, which allowed many non-slaveholding whites to purchase slaves to grow cotton, build roads, and clear the surrounding forests for cultivation. By 1860, Lauderdale County's enslaved population had more than doubled—a fact that fed support for secessionism after the election of Abraham Lincoln. On February 16, 1864, U.S. Army forces commanded by General William T. Sherman raided Marion and destroyed the railroad connecting it to Meridian. In 1870, voters opted to move the county seat from Marion to Meridian, which had expanded rapidly since the end of the Civil War.

== Geography ==
Marion is located in central Lauderdale County, bordered to the north, west, and south by the city of Meridian. Downtown Meridian is 5 miles (8 km) to the southwest via Dale Drive. U.S. Route 45 passes through the east side of Marion on a four-lane bypass that continues south around Meridian. The bypass ends at the northeast corner of Marion, and US 45 continues north-northeast from there 83 miles (134 km) to Columbus.

According to the United States Census Bureau, the town has a total area of 2.9 square miles (7.6 km^{2}), of which 0.01 square miles (0.02 km^{2}), or 0.27%, are water. Sowashee Creek forms the eastern boundary of the town and flows southwest through Meridian to join Okatibbee Creek, part of the Chickasawhay River and ultimately the Pascagoula River watershed.

=== Climate ===
The climate in this area is characterized by hot, humid summers and generally mild to cool winters. According to the Köppen Climate Classification system, Marion has a humid subtropical climate, abbreviated "Cfa" on climate maps.

== Demographics ==
Historical population
Census	Pop.	Note	%±
1880	347		—
1980	771		—
1990	1,359		76.3%
2000	1,305		−4.0%
2010	1,479		13.3%
2020	1,751		18.4%
U.S. Decennial Census

=== 2020 census ===
As of the 2020 census, Marion had a population of 1,751. The median age was 37.2 years. 25.8% of residents were under the age of 18 and 17.6% were 65 years of age or older. For every 100 females there were 77.6 males, and for every 100 females age 18 and over there were 72.1 males.

There were 688 households and 436 families in Marion. Of all households, 40.8% had children under the age of 18 living in them. 35.8% were married-couple households, 17.9% were households with a male householder and no spouse or partner present, and 41.7% were households with a female householder and no spouse or partner present. About 30.7% of all households were made up of individuals, and 9.6% had someone living alone who was 65 years of age or older.

There were 745 housing units, of which 7.7% were vacant. The homeowner vacancy rate was 3.9% and the rental vacancy rate was 6.3%. 96.9% of residents lived in urban areas, while 3.1% lived in rural areas.

Marion Racial Composition
Race	Num.	Perc.
White	684	39.06%
Black or African American	922	52.66%
Asian	40	2.28%
Pacific Islander	2	0.11%
Other/Mixed	44	2.51%
Hispanic or Latino	59	3.37%

=== 2000 census ===
As of the census of 2000, there were 1,305 people, 468 households, and 324 families residing in the town. The population density was 448.7 inhabitants per square mile (173.2/km^{2}). There were 555 housing units at an average density of 190.8 per square mile (73.7/km^{2}). The racial makeup of the town was 52.87% White, 45.82% African American, 0.23% Native American, 0.31% Asian, 0.15% from other races, and 0.61% from two or more races. Hispanic or Latino of any race were 1.69% of the population.

There were 468 households, out of which 42.3% had children under the age of 18 living with them, 37.2% were married couples living together, 28.0% had a female householder with no husband present, and 30.6% were non-families. 25.0% of all households were made up of individuals, and 6.4% had someone living alone who was 65 years of age or older. The average household size was 2.50 and the average family size was 3.00.

In the town, the population was spread out, with 28.4% under the age of 18, 11.3% from 18 to 24, 27.4% from 25 to 44, 16.6% from 45 to 64, and 16.4% who were 65 years of age or older. The median age was 31 years. For every 100 females, there were 70.1 males. For every 100 females age 18 and over, there were 62.3 males.

The median income for a household in the town was $26,413, and the median income for a family was $28,438. Males had a median income of $27,778 versus $17,303 for females. The per capita income for the town was $10,504. About 30.5% of families and 32.8% of the population were below the poverty line, including 50.1% of those under age 18 and 20.5% of those age 65 or over.

== Notable people ==
- Oscar Lee Gray, member of the United States House of Representatives from 1915 to 1919
