= Natasha Trethewey =

American poet (born 1966)

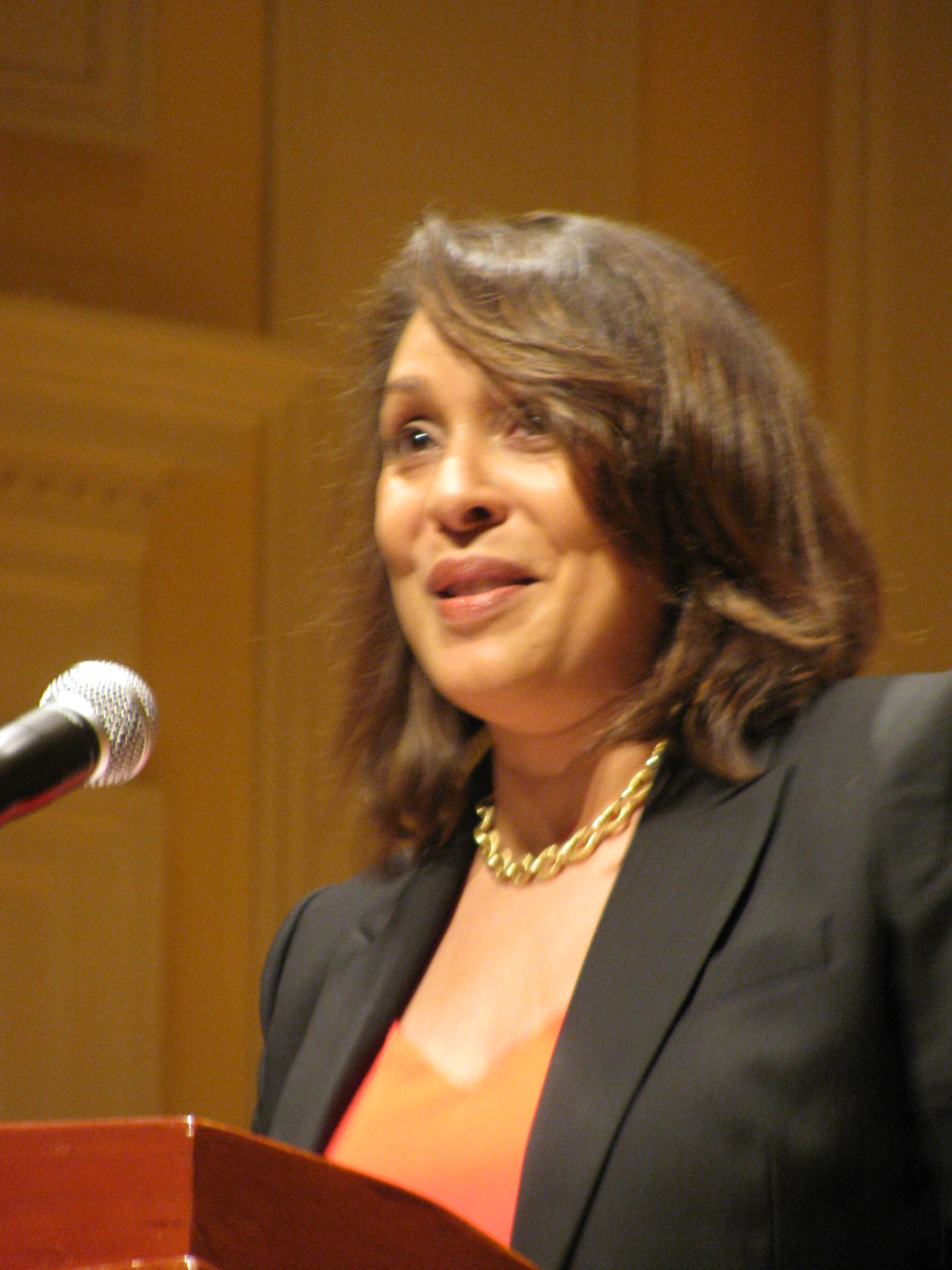
- Trethewey reading at the Library of Congress in 2013
- Born: April 26, 1966 (age 60); Gulfport, Mississippi, U.S.
- Education: University of Georgia (BA); Hollins University (MA); University of Massachusetts, Amherst (MFA)
- Occupations: Poet, professor
- Spouse: Brett Gadsden
- Writing career
- Genre: Poetry
- Notable awards: Bobbitt National Prize for Poetry (2020); Heinz Award (2017); Pulitzer Prize for Poetry (2007); Cave Canem Poetry Prize (1999)

United States Poet Laureate
- In office 2012–2014
- Preceded by: Philip Levine
- Succeeded by: Charles Wright

Poet Laureate of Mississippi
- In office 2012–2016
- Preceded by: Winifred Hamrick Farrar
- Succeeded by: Beth Ann Fennelly

Natasha Trethewey (born April 26, 1966) is an American poet who served as United States Poet Laureate from 2012 to 2014. She won the 2007 Pulitzer Prize in Poetry for her 2006 collection Native Guard, and is a former Poet Laureate of Mississippi.

Trethewey is the Board of Trustees Professor of English at Northwestern University. She previously served as the Robert W. Woodruff Professor of English and Creative Writing at Emory University, where she taught from 2001 to 2017.

Trethewey was elected in 2019 both to the American Academy of Arts and Letters and as a Chancellor of the Academy of American Poets. Academy of American Poets Chancellor David St. John said Trethewey “is one of our formal masters, a poet of exquisite delicacy and poise who is always unveiling the racial and historical inequities of our country and the ongoing personal expense of these injustices. Rarely has any poetic intersection of cultural and personal experience felt more inevitable, more painful, or profound.” Trethewey was elected to the American Philosophical Society in 2022.

== Early years and personal life ==
Natasha Trethewey was born in Gulfport, Mississippi, on April 26, 1966, to Eric Trethewey and Gwendolyn Ann Turnbough. Her parents traveled to Ohio to marry because their marriage was illegal in Mississippi at the time of Trethewey's birth, a year before the U.S. Supreme Court struck down anti-miscegenation laws with Loving v. Virginia. Her birth certificate noted the race of her mother as "colored", and the race of her father as "Canadian".

Trethewey's mother, Gwendolyn Ann Turnbough, was a social worker and part of the inspiration for Native Guard (2006), which is dedicated to her memory. Trethewey's parents divorced when she was six; Turnbough was murdered in 1985 by her second husband, whom she had recently divorced, when Trethewey was 19 years old. Recalling her reaction to her mother's death, she said: "that was the moment when I both felt that I would become a poet and then immediately afterward felt that I would not. I turned to poetry to make sense of what had happened."

Trethewey's father, Canadian emigrant Eric Trethewey, was also a poet and a professor of English at Hollins University.

Trethewey is married to historian Brett Gadsden.

== Education ==
Trethewey earned her B.A. degree in English from the University of Georgia, an M.A. in English and Creative Writing from Hollins University, and an M.F.A. in poetry from the University of Massachusetts Amherst in 1995. In May 2010 Trethewey delivered the commencement speech at Hollins University and was awarded an honorary doctorate. She had previously received an honorary degree from Delta State University in her native Mississippi.

== Poetry ==
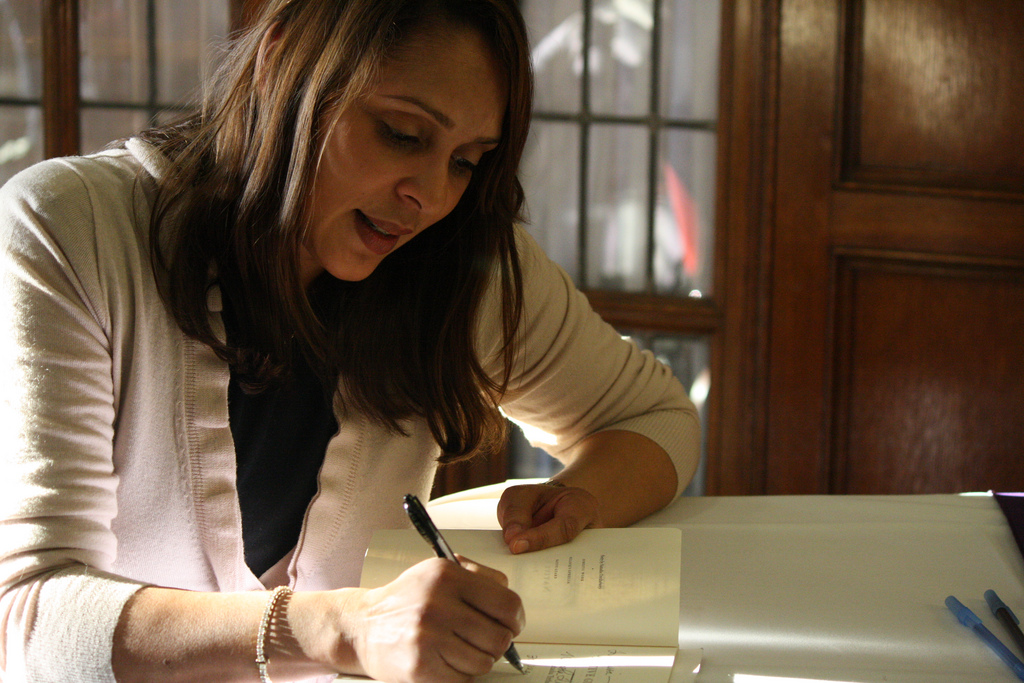
Trethewey during book signing at the University of Michigan, 2011

Structurally, her work combines free verse with more structured, traditional forms such as the sonnet and the villanelle. Thematically, her work examines "memory and the racial legacy of America". The many publications in which her work has appeared include The Best American Poetry (2000 and 2003), Agni, American Poetry Review, Callaloo, The Gettysburg Review, The Kenyon Review, New England Review, and The Southern Review, as well as in the 2019 anthology New Daughters of Africa, edited by Margaret Busby.

Trethewey's first published poetry collection, Domestic Work (2000), was the inaugural recipient of the Cave Canem Poetry Prize for a first book by an African-American poet. The book explores the work and lives of black men and women in the South.

Bellocq's Ophelia (2002), for example, is a collection of poetry in the form of an epistolary novella; it tells the fictional story of a mixed-race prostitute who was photographed by E. J. Bellocq in early 20th-century New Orleans.

Her work Beyond Katrina, published in 2010 by the University of Georgia Press, is an account of the devastating events that happened after the hurricane hit the Mississippi Gulf Coast. This novel tells of how her friends, family, and neighbors were affected by the damage of Hurricane Katrina. Her writing includes themes of race conflicts, memories of her family background, and the economic effects of what the hurricane caused. Although it is a work of nonfiction, she includes her poetry to capture the events that were caused beyond the hurricane itself. She also tackles what it is like being an African American in a troubled state of circumstance with the place where one grew up and loves. Trethewey found inspiration for her work in Robert Penn Warren's 1956 book Segregation: The Inner Conflict in the South. Trethewey includes pictures throughout her book alongside her writing. These serve as a visual device, to aid in the readers understanding of the work.

The American Civil War makes frequent appearances in her work. Born on Confederate Memorial Day—exactly 100 years afterwards—Trethewey explains that she could not have "escaped learning about the Civil War and what it represented", and that it had fascinated her since childhood. For example, her 2006 book Native Guard tells the story of the Louisiana Native Guards, an all-black regiment in the Union Army, composed mainly of former slaves who enlisted, that guarded the Confederate prisoners of war.

== United States Poet Laureate ==
On June 7, 2012, James H. Billington, the Librarian of Congress, named her the 19th United States Poet Laureate. Billington said, after hearing her poetry at the National Book Festival, that he was "immediately struck by a kind of classic quality with a richness and variety of structures with which she presents her poetry … she intermixes her story with the historical story in a way that takes you deep into the human tragedy of it." Newspapers noted that unlike most poets laureate, Trethewey is in the middle of her career. She was also the first laureate to take up residence in Washington, D.C., when she did so in January 2013.

Trethewey was appointed for a second term as US Poet Laureate in 2013, and as several previous multiyear laureates had done, Trethewey took on a project, which took the form of a regular section on PBS News Hour called "Where Poetry Lives". On May 14, 2014, Trethewey delivered her final lecture to conclude her second term as US Poet Laureate.

== Beyond Katrina: A Meditation on the Mississippi Gulf Coast (2010) ==
Trethewey's novel Beyond Katrina: A Meditation of the Mississippi Gulf Coast (2010) accounts her personal experience growing up in the community of Gulfport, Mississippi and the effects that Hurricane Katrina had on not only her family, but the communities of the Mississippi Gulf Coast as a whole. Trethewey examines the experiences of the surviving community through the effects of tourism culture, casinos, and land erosion's impact on community life, culture, and work. She goes great lengths to provide analysis on the communities of the Mississippi Gulf Coast's dependence on the tourism industry and how it has become a source of strife, as it provides jobs for individuals in the community but also has impact on the already declining environment. While examining the economic fallout of Hurricane Katrina, she takes time in the novel to make note of extreme effects the disaster had on African Americans who were hit the hardest in the gulf coast communities. Through giving personal accounts of her family, particularly her brother's struggle, and statistics of economic recovery, she highlights the struggle of African Americans move to recover and rebuild after the wake of Hurricane Katrina.

This novel is also written in two separate proses. Switching between poetry and nonfiction, Trethewey means to give the reader her personal stake in the matter while also providing grounded statistical data for the recovery and aftermath of Mississippi Gulf Coast communities after Hurricane Katrina.

== Positions ==
Trethewey has held appointments at Duke University, as the Lehman Brady Joint Chair Professor of Documentary and American Studies, and at Emory University, where she was Robert W. Woodruff Professor of English and Creative Writing; the University of North Carolina-Chapel Hill; and Yale University.

== Bibliography ==
=== Poetry ===
- Domestic Work. Graywolf Press. 2000. ISBN 978-1-55597-309-4.
- Bellocq's Ophelia. Graywolf Press. 2002. ISBN 978-1-55597-359-9.
- Native Guard. Houghton Mifflin. 2006. ISBN 978-0-618-87265-7.
- Beyond Katrina: A Meditation on the Mississippi Gulf Coast. University of Georgia Press. 2010. ISBN 978-0-8203-3381-6.
- Thrall. Houghton Mifflin. 2012. ISBN 978-0547571607.
- Monument: Poems New and Selected. Houghton Mifflin. 2018. ISBN 978-1328507846.

=== As editor ===
- Trethewey, Natasha; Livengood, Jeb, eds. (2007). Best New Poets 2007. Charlottesville, Virginia: Samovar Press. ISBN 978-0-976-62962-7.

=== Memoir ===
- Trethewey, Natasha (2020). Memorial Drive: A Daughter's Memoir. New York: HarperCollins. ISBN 978-0-06-224857-2.
- Trethewey, Natasha (2024). The House of Being. Why I Write. New Haven: Yale University Press. ISBN 978-0-300-26592-7.

== Awards ==
- 1999: Cave Canem Poetry Prize for Domestic Work, selected by Rita Dove
- 1999: Literature Fellowship from the National Endowment for the Arts
- 2000: Bunting Fellowship for the Harvard Radcliffe Institute
- 2001, 2003, 2007: Mississippi Institute of Arts and Letters Book Prizes
- 2001, 2007: Lillian Smith Book Award
- 2003: Fellowship from the John Simon Guggenheim Memorial Foundation
- 2004: Fellowship from the Rockefeller Foundation for residency at the Bellagio Study Center
- 2007: Pulitzer Prize for Poetry
- 2008: Georgia Woman of the Year by the Georgia Commission on Women
- 2009: James Weldon Johnson Fellow in African American Studies at Yale's Beinecke Library.
- 2011: Georgia Writers Hall of Fame Inductee
- 2012: Golden Plate Award of the American Academy of Achievement
- 2012: Poet Laureate of Mississippi
- 2012: United States Poet Laureate
- 2015: PEN Oakland – Josephine Miles Literary Award
- 2016: Academy of American Poets Fellowship
- 2017: Heinz Award in the Arts and Humanities
- 2018: Sidney Lanier Prize for Southern Literature
- 2020: Bobbitt National Prize for Poetry for Lifetime Achievement
- 2021: Anisfield-Wolf Book Award for Memorial Drive
- 2026: Stone Award for Literary Achievement, Oregon State University
