= Poet Laureate of Mississippi =

- Incumbent; Ann Fisher-Wirth since 2025
- Type: Poet Laureate
- Formation: 1963
- First holder: Maude Willard Leet Prenshaw

The poet laureate of Mississippi is the poet laureate for the U.S. state of Mississippi.

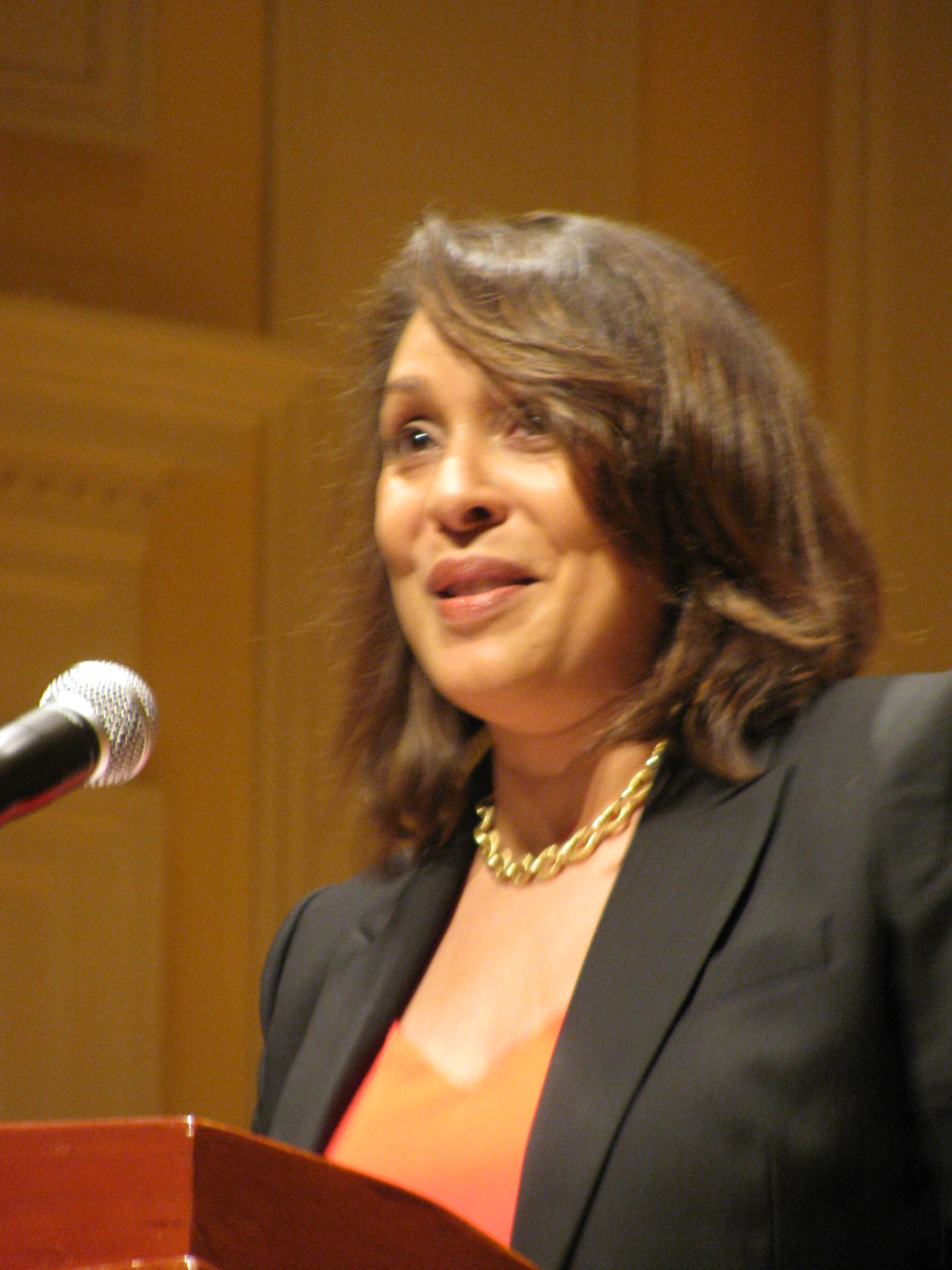
Natasha Trethewey was poet laureate in 2012.

== List of poets laureate ==
#	Poet laureate	Term began	Term ended	Appointed by	Notes
1	Earl Alphonse Cuevas	1935	1963	Poet Laureate League (Washington, D.C.)	
2	Maude Willard Leet Prenshaw	1963	1971 (death)	Gov. Ross Barnett	
3	Louise Moss Montgomery	1973	January 1978 (death)	Gov. William Waller	
4	Winifred Hamrick Farrar	31 July 1978	6 November 2010 (death)	Gov. Cliff Finch	
5	Natasha Trethewey	January 2012	2016	Gov. Haley Barbour	
6	Beth Ann Fennelly	August 2016	March 2021	Gov. Phil Bryant	
7	Catherine Pierce	April 2021	April 2025	Gov. Tate Reeves	
8	Ann Fisher-Wirth	May 2025	present	Gov. Tate Reeves	

== See also ==
- Poet laureate
- List of U.S. state poets laureate
- United States Poet Laureate
