= George W. Taylor (Alabama politician) =

American politician

George Washington Taylor
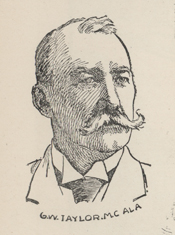
- Taylor in a 1902 engraving

Member of the U.S. House of Representatives from Alabama's 1st district
- In office March 4, 1897 – March 3, 1915
- Preceded by: Richard Henry Clarke
- Succeeded by: Oscar Lee Gray

Member of the Alabama House of Representatives
- In office 1878-1879

Personal details
- Born: January 16, 1849 Montgomery, Alabama, US
- Died: December 21, 1932 (aged 83) Rome, Georgia, US
- Resting place: Oakwood Cemetery (Montgomery, Alabama)
- Party: Democratic
- Spouse: Margaretta Metcalf
- Education: University of South Carolina at Columbia
- Occupation: Attorney, Politician

Military service
- Allegiance: Confederate States
- Branch/service: Confederate States Army
- Years of service: 1864-1865
- Rank: Private
- Unit: 1st South Carolina Cavalry
- Battles/wars: American Civil War

George Washington Taylor (January 16, 1849 – December 21, 1932) was a U.S. representative from Alabama.

== Biography ==
Born on "Roselawn" plantation near Montgomery, Alabama, Taylor attended private schools. While a schoolboy in Columbia, South Carolina, Taylor enlisted in the Confederate States Army in November 1864, and served until the end of the war. Taylor graduated from the University of South Carolina at Columbia in 1867. He then taught school in Mobile, Alabama, and studied law. Taylor was admitted to the bar in Mobile, Alabama, in November 1871 and commenced practice in Butler, Alabama, in 1872. He was a member of the State house of representatives in 1878 and 1879. Taylor was State solicitor for the first judicial circuit of Alabama from 1880 to 1892. He declined a third term, and moved to Demopolis, Alabama, in 1883.

Taylor was elected as a Democrat to the Fifty-fifth and to the eight succeeding Congresses (March 4, 1897 – March 3, 1915). He was not a candidate for renomination in 1914, and resumed the practice of law in Demopolis, Alabama. He was chairman of the State Democratic convention which called the constitutional convention in 1901. Taylor was a delegate to the Democratic National Convention in 1920. He died in Rome, Georgia, while on a visit to that city, on December 21, 1932. He was buried in Oakwood Cemetery, Montgomery, Alabama.

== Notes ==
U.S. House of Representatives
| Preceded by Richard Henry Clarke | Member of the U.S. House of Representatives from Alabama's 1st congressional district 1897 – 1915 | Succeeded by Oscar Lee Gray |
