= Nanabe Creek =

Stream in Mississippi, United States

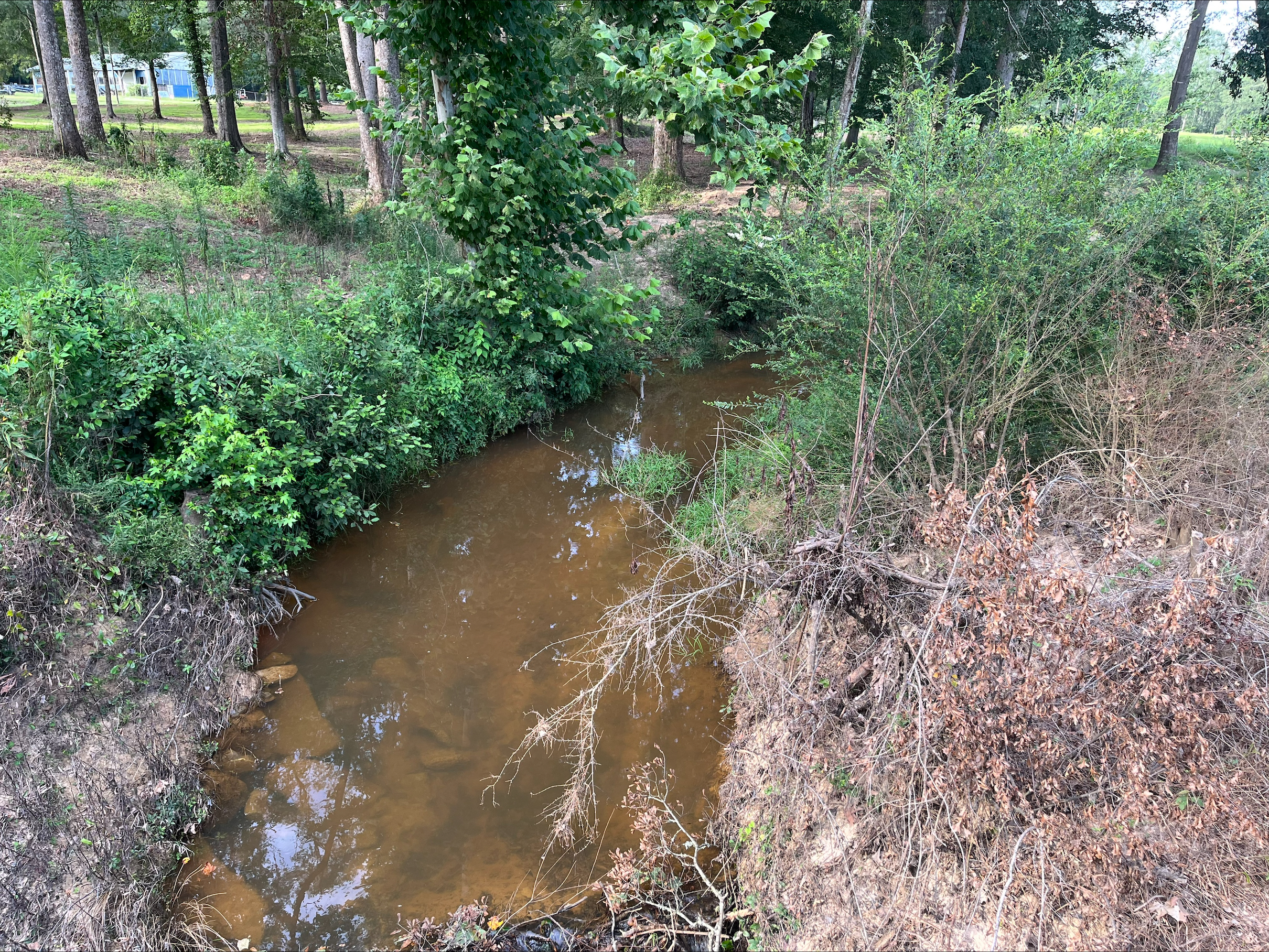
- Nanabe Creek

Location
- Country: United States
- State: Mississippi

Physical characteristics
- Source
  - coordinates: 32.3887528°N 88.5705954°W
- Mouth
  - coordinates: 32.3976421°N 88.6589322°W
- Length: 8.48 mi (13.65 km)

Nanabe Creek is a stream in the U.S. state of Mississippi. It is a tributary to Sowashee Creek.

Nanabe is a name derived from the Choctaw language purported to mean "fish trap".
