= Chickasawhay Creek =

Stream in Mississippi, United States

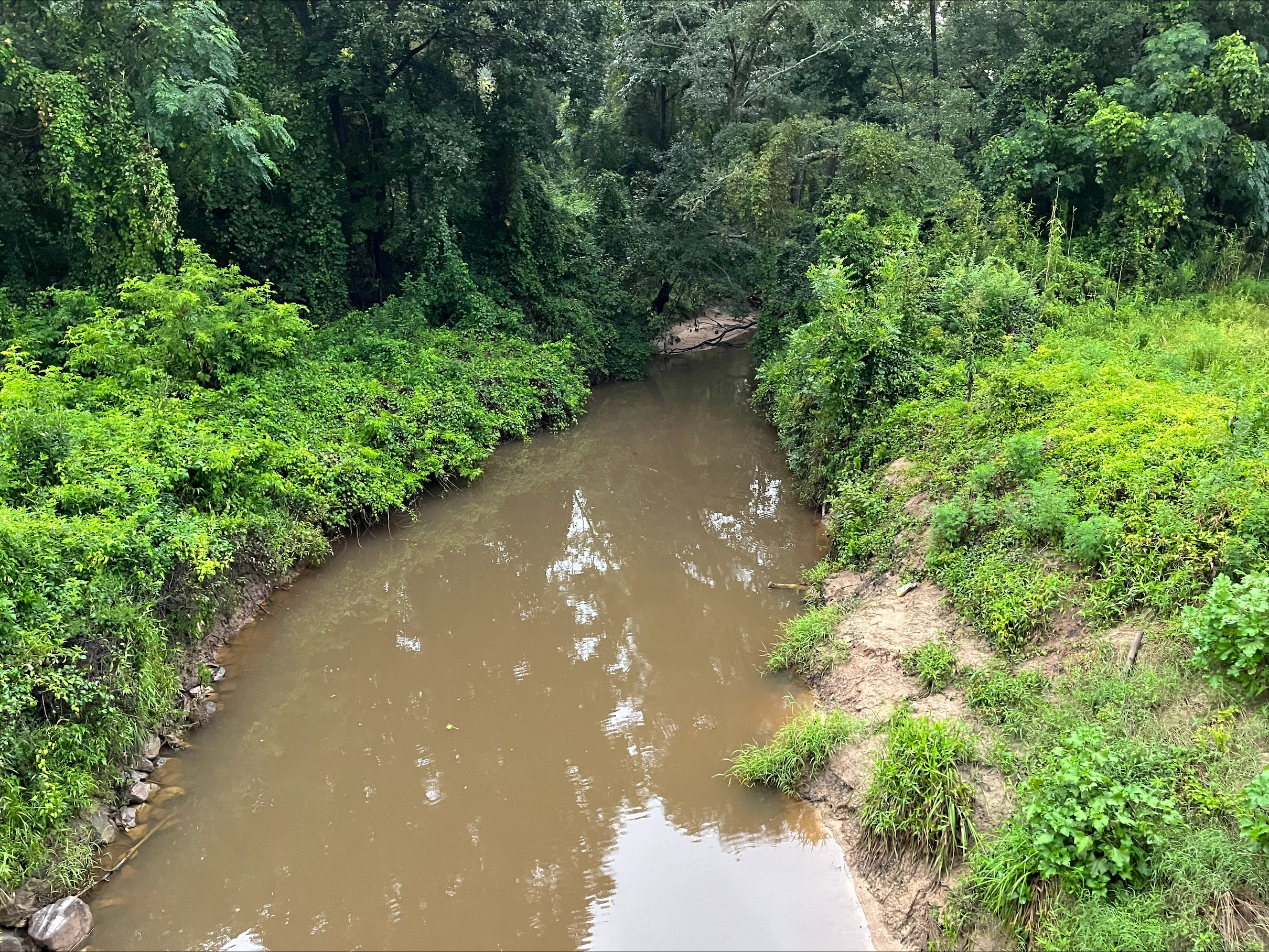
- Chickasawhay Creek

Location
- Country: United States
- State: Mississippi

Physical characteristics
- Source
  - coordinates: 32.7051351°N 88.8494962°W
- Mouth
  - coordinates: 32.5543058°N 88.8011601°W
- Length: 18.21 mi (29.31 km)

Chickasawhay Creek is a stream in the U.S. state of Mississippi. It is a tributary to Okatibbee Creek.

Chickasawhay is a name derived from the Choctaw language meaning "Chickasaw potato". Variant names are "Bogue Chitto Creek", "Chicasawhay Creek", "Chickasahay Creek", and "Chickasawhey Creek".
