= Oscar Lee Gray =

American politician

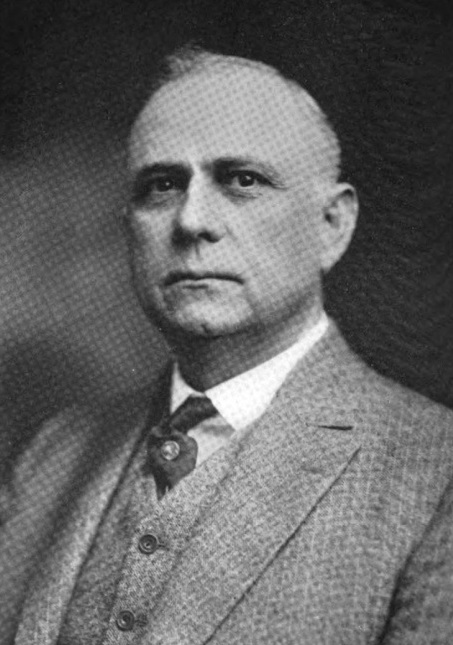
- From Volume II (1927) of History of Alabama and Her People

Member of the U.S. House of Representatives from Alabama's 1st district
- In office March 4, 1915 – March 3, 1919
- Preceded by: George W. Taylor
- Succeeded by: John McDuffie

Personal details
- Born: Oscar Lee Gray; July 2, 1865 Marion, Mississippi, US
- Died: January 2, 1936 (aged 70) Shreveport, Louisiana, US
- Resting place: Forest Park Cemetery, Shreveport, Louisiana
- Party: Democratic
- Education: University of Alabama
- Profession: Attorney; Judge

Oscar Lee Gray (July 2, 1865 – January 2, 1936) was a U.S. representative from Alabama.

Born in Marion, Mississippi, Gray attended school in Choctaw County, Alabama. He studied law, graduated from the University of Alabama in 1885, and was admitted to the Alabama bar. Gray taught school and served as Superintendent of Education for Choctaw County. He served as solicitor for the First Judicial Circuit from 1904 to 1910 and was a delegate to the 1912 Democratic National Convention.

Gray was elected as a Democrat to the Sixty-fourth and Sixty-fifth Congresses (March 4, 1915 – March 3, 1919). He served on the Rivers and Harbors Committee and was the first Congressman to sign the World War I Declaration of War. His 1918 re-election campaign materials boast of his relationship with and support for U.S. President Woodrow Wilson:

"He Stood by the President All the Time Let's all Stand by Him this Time."

After serving in Congress he returned to the Gray Plantation in Butler, Alabama, and resumed the practice of law. In November 1934 he was elected Judge of the Alabama First Judicial Circuit Court.

He died January 2, 1936, in Shreveport, Louisiana, the home of his daughter and son-in-law (Bess Gray Garrett and Dr. Broox Cleveland Garrett) and grandchildren (Betty Gray Garrett and Broox C. Garrett, Jr.). Gray was interred next to his widow Laura Lee Gray, at Forest Park Cemetery in Shreveport.

Gray's great-granddaughter, Dr. Betsy Vogel Boze, served as president of The College of The Bahamas.

U.S. House of Representatives
Preceded by George W. Taylor	Member of the U.S. House of Representatives from Alabama's 1st congressional district 1915 – 1919	Succeeded by John McDuffie
