= Anthony F. Klinkner =

Anthony F. Klinkner (July 10, 1880 - May 13, 1953) was a Catholic American poet and journalist who served as poet laureate of Iowa.

== Early life ==
Anthony Ferdinand Timothy Klinkner was born on July 10, 1880, in Cascade, Iowa to John H. Klinkner and Margaret Knippling. He graduated from St. Mary's High School. He married Margaret Wallace of Cottage Hill, Iowa on June 27, 1905, and they had two children, John and Helen.

== Writing ==
Klinkner was the editor of the Catholic Daily Tribune beginning in 1919, and worked at the Dubuque Telegraph Herald, Waukegon Republican and Cascade Pioneer. He also edited Young America from 1897 to 1903 and Farley News from 1904 to 1910. He was a member of the Catholic Poetry Society of America, Iowa Catholic Historical Society, Catholic Order of Foresters, and St. Vincent de Paul Society. At the time of his being named poet laureate, he had been publishing poetry for 25 years. He was officially proclaimed state laureate on August 10, 1933, at the Pioneers' dinner held for Dubuque, Iowa's Centennial celebration. The appointment was recognized by then Governor Clyde L. Herring. His work was anthologized in the United States, Canada, Ireland, and France.

== Books ==
- Ten Nights in Fairy Land (1921)
- Selected Poems (1935)

== Poems ==
- "Memorial Day Apostrope" The Holdrege Progress May 22, 1919
- "St. Francis" Lake Shore Visitor July 27, 1928
- "Children" The Kindergarten 1929.
- "God Cares for Me" Our Sunday Visitor December 20, 1929
- "Just Be What You Can" Home Talk the Star March 14, 1930
- "Memorial Day" The Sioux City Journal May 30, 1930
- "Shine, Gold Star" The Sioux City Journal September 28, 1930
- "Jesus Loves You Best" Our Sunday Visitor October 10, 1930
- "Sonnet for Mother" The Sioux City Journal October 12, 1930
- "Have Pity" Lake Shore Visitor Feb 6, 1931
- "Missionaries" Our Sunday Visitor February 13, 1931
- "Mississippi River" The Muscatine Journal March 24, 1931
- "Charity" Lake Shore Visitor March 27, 1931
- "Life" The Sioux City Journal March 27, 1931
- "God Can See the Good in Each" Lake Shore Visitor April 24, 1931
- "Colored Gold Star Mothers" The Sioux City Journal June 27, 1931
- "Kindness" The Tablet July 4, 1931
- "Brotherhood" Lake Shore Visitor July 17, 1931
- "A Model" The Tablet July 18, 1931
- "Glory" The Tablet October 17, 1931
- "Bugle Call" The Sioux City Journal January 27, 1932
- "Engraver's Tools" The Sioux City Journal February 2, 1932
- "Lone Wolf" The Sioux City Journal February 13, 1932
- "God's Minstrel" Watauga Democrat June 2, 1932
- "A Word of Cheer" Cedar County News July 28, 1932
- "Dream of Love" Kansas City Journal November 12, 1932
- "The Chimes of St. Luke" St. Louis Globe-Democrat November 14, 1932
- "Joys of Home" The Sioux City Journal February 8, 1933
- "Tribute to Sara Teasdale" St. Louis Globe-Democrat February 15, 1933
- "Roses and Hearts" The Sioux City Journal May 18, 1933
- "Major S. H. M. Byers" The Des Moines Register May 28, 1933
- "Summer Moon" The Sioux City Journal May 25, 1933
- "Ultimate" The Sioux City Journal June 12, 1933
- "Doors" The Sioux City Journal June 19, 1933
- "I would be with Those I Love The Sioux City Journal June 23, 1933
- "Love" The Sioux City Journal June 26, 1933
- "Beauty" The Sioux City Journal July 2, 1933
- "Service Stars" The Sioux City Journal July 17, 1933
- "Twilight in Iowa" The Sioux City Journal August 7, 1933
- "The Poet" The Sioux City Journal August 14, 1933
- "Missouri River" The Sioux City Journal August 27, 1933
- "Spinster Mothers" The Sioux City Journal September 10, 1933
- "Ragged Men" The Sioux City Journal September 17, 1933
- "September in Iowa" The Sioux City Journal September 24, 1933
- "Our Brother" Ralls County Record November 17, 1933
- "Tragedy" The Sioux City Journal February 11, 1934
- "Old Women who Live in Old Houses" The Sioux City Journal February 18, 1934
- "Flowers" The Sioux City Journal February 25, 1934
- "Remembering" The Sioux City Journal March 18, 1934
- "Old Towns and Old Streets" The Sioux City Journal April 1, 1934
- "Happiness" The Sioux City Journal May 6, 1934
- "Luster" The Sioux City Journal May 13, 1934
- "Night" The Sioux City Journal May 20, 1934
- "As It Seems" Ledger-Star December 8, 1934
- "Purpose" The Southern Democrat December 20, 1934
- "In Praise of Lovely Things" The Humboldt Republican September 27, 1935
- "Laureate Writes Poem on Eucharist Congress" Our Sunday Visitor November 15, 1935
- "Mark and the River" St. Louis Globe-Democrat March 7, 1936
- "Fr. Timothy Dempsey" St. Louis Globe-Democrat April 11, 1936
- "The Things that Fascinate" The Tablet June 27, 1936
- "A New Year" Times Union December 29, 1936
- "Peace Be to this House" Oklahoma City Star February 26, 1937
- "To Go Up an Unclouded Way"" Quad-City Times July 7, 1937
- "Maquoketa" Quad-City Times July 22, 1937
- "The Rendezvous" Quad-City Times August 23, 1937
- "Ballad of 4 A.M." Quad-City Times November 23, 1937
- "Youth and Age" Quad-City Times December 6, 1937
- "When it's Time to Go" Quad-City Times December 17, 1937
- "Poor" Quad-City Times December 23, 1937
- "Forgetfulness" Quad-City Times January 3, 1938
- "Mince" Quad-City Times January 25, 1938
- "Beauty is a Fugitive" Quad-City Times February 3, 1938
- "Dreams of Old Desires" Quad-City Times February 25, 1938
- "For All of That" Quad-City Times March 22, 1938
- "Wooden Heels" Quad-City Times April 8, 1938
- "A Lucky Guy" Quad-City Times April 26, 1938
- "Nursery Door" Quad-City Times May 11, 1938
- "The Stars are Marching Bayonets" Quad-City Times May 17, 1938
- "Little Girl in the Long Skirt" Quad-City Times May 23, 1938
- "That One Bright Rose should Bloom" Quad-City Times May 29, 1938
- "Rest" Quad-City Times May 31, 1938
- "Crazy Pattern" Quad-City Times June 10, 1938
- "12 Year Old" Quad-City Times June 24, 1938
- "Sixty Seconds" Quad-City Times June 29, 1938
- "Thru Freight" Quad-City Times August 10, 1938
- "Sure Retreat" Quad-City Times August 30, 1938
- "Small Towns" Quad-City Times September 19, 1938
- "Nature" Quad-City Times October 6, 1938
- "Until the End" Quad-City Times October 16, 1938
- "Button! Button!" Quad-City Times January 9, 1939
- "December in Iowa" Quad-City Times January 29, 1939
- "An Old Astronomer" Quad-City Times February 7, 1939
- "For Leslie E. Spaulding" Quad-City Times February 10, 1939
- "Spring" Quad-City Times March 9, 1939
- "Prayer" Quad-City Times March 23, 1939
- "Question" Quad-City Times March 28, 1939
- "Easter Lily" Quad-City Times April 2, 1939
- "April" Quad-City Times April 7, 1939
- "Memory" Quad-City Times May 16, 1939
- "Let Me Go Down Unterrified" Quad-City Times May 29, 1939
- "Apocalypse" Quad-City Times June 12, 1939
- "Vain Gifts" Springfield News-Sun June 28, 1939
- "I should be True to Silence" Quad-City Times July 6, 1939
- "The Mosquito" Quad-City Times July 31, 1939
- "As It Seems" The Troy Messenger August 19, 1940
- "Bread and Wine" Globe-Gazette November 4, 1940
