= Julious C. Hill (poet) =

Julious Caesar Hill (September 15, 1902 – July 15, 1983) was an African-American and Creek poet from Oklahoma. He was the first Black poet laureate in America. He was named the Poet Laureate of Oklahoma by the Poet Laureate League of America in 1939.

== Early life and education ==
Hill was born in Laurel, Mississippi on September 15, 1902 to John Calhoun Hill, an attorney and poet, and Alberta Hill Hair, a school teacher and musician. Hill had Sudanese and Creek Freedman ancestry. He attended public school in Meridian, Mississippi, and Tuscaloosa, Alabama, junior high and military training at the Tuskegee Institute, and high school at Alcorn Agricultural & Mechanical College. He completed his A.B. degree in English at Langston University in 1932. Hill served in the United States Navy for five years during both world wars with the sixth Atlantic fleet.

In 1949 Hill applied to the University of Oklahoma to study for a master's degree in English in order to pursue a teaching career. He listed his race as American, and was denied student housing in Norman due to segregation and sundown laws. Oklahoma Attorney General Mac Q. Williamson argued that Hill be denied admission to the graduate program. In the fall of 1949 OU created its first dormitory to house Black students due to Hill's advocacy. The board of regents sided with Hill, ordering the University to provide him with housing. He became the first Black student to live in OU housing.

== Poetry ==
Hill moved to Oklahoma in 1926 on a poetry fellowship. He authored poetry collections, The Upreach, Sooner Song (Empire Publishing, 1935), and A Song of Magnolia (Meador Publishing, 1937). His poetry was featured at the 1939 World's Fair in New York, and appears in the World's Fair Anthology of Verse. Five of his poems from Sooner Song were anthologized in Modern Troubadour by Brounsworth of New York in 1936.

His poem "A Windy Night" was anthologized in Oklahoma and Arkansas Poets in 1935 and reprinted in Paebar Anthology of Verse, 8th edition. He was also published in The Paper Anthology of Verse, Tuskegee Student, Tulsa Daily World, The Tulsa Tribune, Modern American Poetry, True-Fact Magazine, and The Skyline. He was one of four Black poets to be listed in the 1935 edition of Who's Who in American Poetry.
