= Suqualena Creek =

Stream in Mississippi, United States

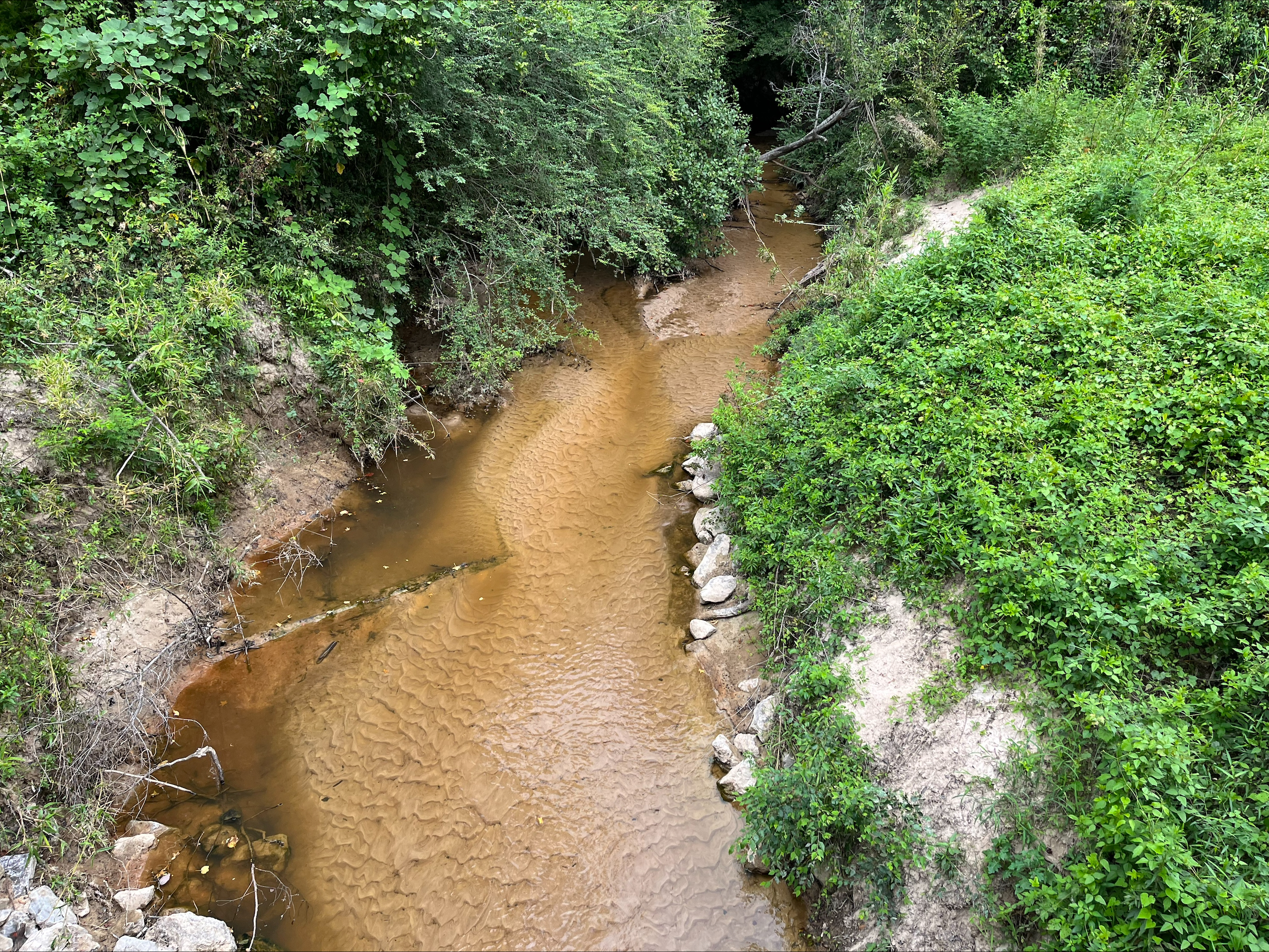
- Suqualena Creek

Location
- Country: United States
- State: Mississippi

Physical characteristics
- Source
  - coordinates: 32.5170843°N 88.877551°W
- Mouth
  - coordinates: 32.4348641°N 88.7811589°W
- Length: 11.1 mi (17.9 km)

Suqualena Creek is a stream in the U.S. state of Mississippi. It is a tributary of Okatibbee Creek.

Suqualena is a name derived from the Choctaw language purported to mean (sources vary) "creek on whose banks are camps" or "poor hog". A variant name is "Sookalena Creek".

The creek lends its name to the nearby community of Suqualena.
