= Okatibbee Dam =

Coordinates: 32°28′33″N 88°47′52″W

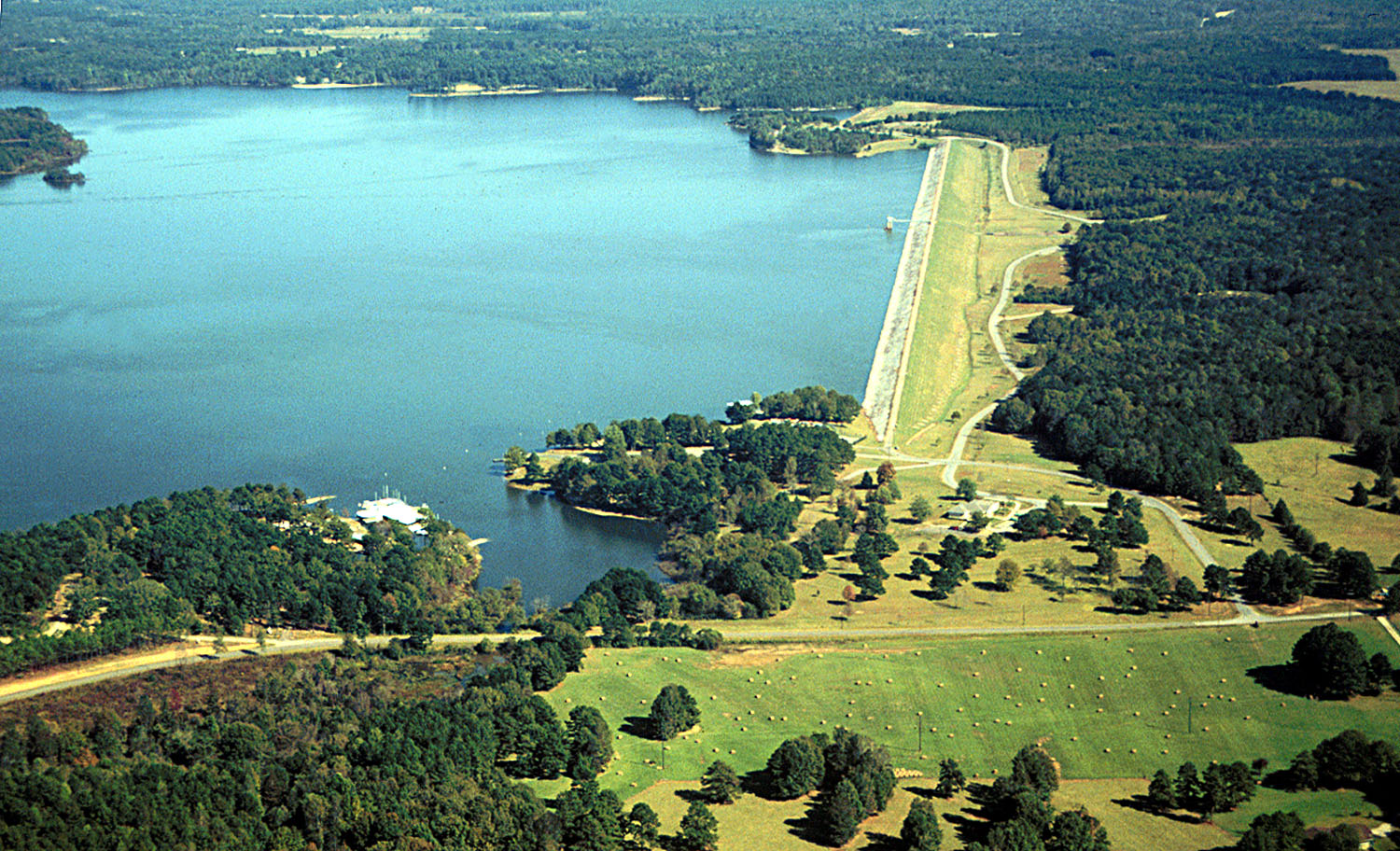
- Okatibbee Lake and Dam on Okatibbee Creek, a tributary of the Chickasawhay River
- Interactive map of Okatibbee Dam
- Country: United States
- Location: Lauderdale County, Mississippi, USA
- Status: Operational
- Opening date: 1968
- Designed by: United States Army Corps of Engineers

Dam and spillways
- Impounds: Okatibbee Creek
- Height: 72 ft (22 m)
- Length: 6,620 ft (2,020 m)

Reservoir
- Creates: Okatibbee Lake
- Total capacity: 59,481 acre⋅ft (73,369,000 m^{3})
- Active capacity: 46,538 acre⋅ft (57,404,000 m^{3})
- Surface area: 5.9 sq mi (15 km^{2})
- Normal elevation: 341 ft (104 m)

Okatibbee Dam is a dam in Lauderdale County, Mississippi.

The earthen gravity dam was constructed in 1968 by the United States Army Corps of Engineers with a height of 72 feet (22 m) and a length of 6,620 feet (2,020 m) at its crest. It impounds Okatibbee Creek for flood control and municipal drinking water. The dam is owned and operated by the Corps of Engineers.

The reservoir it creates, Okatibbee Lake, has a water surface of 5.9 square miles (15 km^{2}), about 28 miles (45 km) miles of shoreline, a maximum capacity of 59,481 acre-feet (73,369,000 m^{3}), and a normal storage capacity of 46,538 acre-feet (57,404,000 m^{3}). Recreation options include boating, fishing, camping, hunting, and enjoying the five parks maintained by the Corps, one full service campground and four day-use parks. Directly north of the lake is the state's Okatibbee State Wildlife Area.
