= Joseph R. Halstead =

Joseph R. Halstead (March 31, 1897 - November 13, 1987), also known as Father Dom Placid Kleppel, O.S.B., was a Catholic American poet, educator, and clergyman. He was named poet laureate of North Carolina in 1935.

== Early life ==
Thomas Joseph Richard Halstead was born on March 31, 1897 in Brooklyn, New York. He was educated in Newark, New Jersey parochial schools, St. Anselm's college in Manchester, New Hampshire, Belmont Abbey College, St. Vincent's College in Latrobe, Pennsylvania, the University of Notre Dame, the Catholic University of America, and Duke University. He earned his M.A. at Catholic University in 1932. On December 21, 1933, he received an honorary doctorate of literature from Leon de Aryan University in Baltimore, Maryland. While working on a Doctorate of Philosophy at Duke, his studies focused on North Carolina literary history. He moved to North Carolina in September 1921. He worked at Belmont Abbey College as a professor of Greek and English for 15 years, and was the head of the English Department and Discipline for five. He left Belmont Abbey after his abbot disapproved of his accepting the poet laureateship. He reverted to using his legal name of Halstead for further public appearances. In 1936 he resigned from the priesthood to marry Ruby Hamilton, daughter of Claude A. Hamilton, of Charlotte, North Carolina. The couple relocated to Jacksonville, Florida, where she died on March 21, 1976. He later remarried to Mary Lee Halstead until his death on November 13, 1987.

== Poetry ==
Halstead was a member of the Poetry Society of America, the Catholic Poetry Society of America, and the North Carolina Poetry Society. He was an associate editor for the North Carolina Poetry Review. He was published in Catholic World, the Fortnightly Review, State and the Little Flower Monastery Messenger. He also wrote book reviews and a column for the Charlotte News.

== Books ==
- The Pageant of the Beads
- Benedict
- Paintings and Other Poems The Abbey Press. 1933.
- Silver Maid and Other Poems
- From the Hid Battlements Caxton Printers. 1935.
- Trackless Fugitives
- The Tompsonians
- Bibliography of North Carolina Poetry
- Notes for a Survey Course in English Literature
