= Sowashee Creek =

Stream in Mississippi, United States

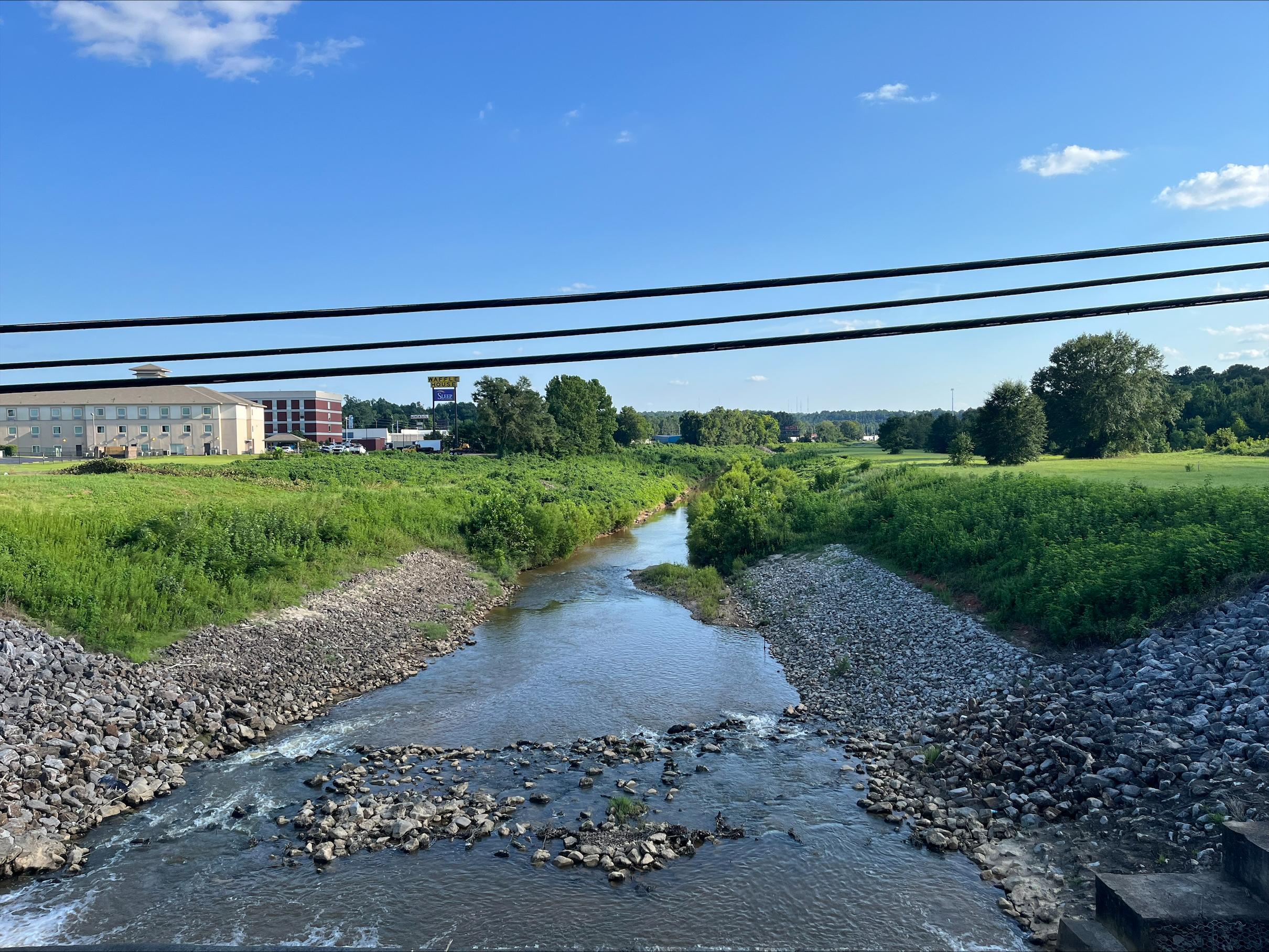
- Sowashee Creek in Meridian, Mississippi

Location
- Country: United States
- State: Mississippi

Physical characteristics
- Source
  - coordinates: 32.4745846°N 88.6083748°W
- Mouth
  - coordinates: 32.3043112°N 88.7511578°W
- Length: 20.5 mi (33.0 km)
- Basin size: 52.1 sq mi (135 km^{2})

Sowashee Creek is a stream in the U.S. state of Mississippi. Tributaries include Nanabe Creek. Sowashee Creek is a tributary of Okatibbee Creek.

Sowashee is a name derived from the Choctaw language meaning "raccoons are there". Variant names are "Siwashee Creek", "Sowwasha Creek", and "Sowwashy Creek".

== History ==
The city of Meridian was founded on the banks of Sowashee Creek and "Sowashee" was suggested as a possible name for the new community.

The City of Meridian is constructing the Sowashee Creek Bike Trail, a multi-use recreational trail.

Sowashee Creek has been subject to multiple instances of pollution and industrial runoff, including a violation of the Clean Water Act that included a $120 million fine from the Environmental Protection Agency against the City of Meridian and a 5,000 gallon diesel fuel spill from a Norfolk Southern railway yard.
