= Margarette Ball Dickson =

American poet and educator

Margarette Ball Dickson (June 4, 1879 – July 21, 1963) was an American poet and educator who served as the first poet laureate for the state of Minnesota.

== Early life ==
Margarette Adell Ball was born in Little Rock, Iowa to Leroy Augustus Ball and Mary Adell Mansfield. She graduated Rock Rapids High School, and earned her B.A. from Iowa State Teachers College in 1925 and M.A. at the University of South Dakota in 1926. She studied at the University of Iowa, earning a Ph.D. She headed the English department at Valparaiso University in Indiana, taught creative writing at California State Teacher's College in Chico, and was a correspondence course instructor for the Stapes School of Writing. She married George Robert Dickson on June 1, 1904, who worked for the Chicago and North Western Railway. The couple had two sons and one daughter. She remarried fellow poet John Allison Haining in 1930. She remarried to Andrew Christian Jensen on June 5, 1945, but retained Margarette Ball Dickson as her pen name. She was also a member of the Daughters of the American Revolution, the Order of the Eastern Star, the American Association of University Women, and General Federation of Women's Clubs.

== Poetry ==
Dickson was appointed state poet laureate by Minnesota Governor Floyd B. Olson on April 25, 1934. By 1936 she had been published in 53 anthologies. She co-founded the Minnesota Poetry League and was its second president, and was president of the Minnesota Poetry Society. She was national vice president of the League of American Pen Women and president of the American Poetry Circle. She was also member of the National Country Bard Association, American Lit Association, and American Literary League.

Dickson was a founder of the Midwest Federation of Chaparral Poets, serving as its regional director from 1939 to 1951, and national director until her death in 1963. She also helped organize the East Coast Canadian Chaparral Poets and European Chaparral Poets.

== Publications ==
=== Books ===
- Gumbo Lillies 1925.
- South Dakota Poetry as the Voice of the Commonwealth 1926.
- Glimpses of Washington 1925.
- Those Were the Days 1926.
- Tumbleweeds Harold Vinal. 1927.
- Patterns and Poems Argus Publishing. 1938.
- More Patterns for Poems Argus. 1947.
- A Son Enlists Argus. 1947.

=== Editor ===
- Country Bard magazine
- The American Bard magazine
- Modern Poems for Special Days (1928)
- Thorns & Thistledown 1927.
- The Owl (League of American Penwomen) Dean & Co. 1929
- One Man and a Dream Argus. (1937)
- Yearbook of the League of Minnesota Poets (1937)
- Book of Father Verse Argus. 1947.

=== Anthologies ===
- Bookfellows Anthology 1925 (1925)
- Fifty Poems by American Poets Dean & Company. (1925)
- "Stray Kittens" The Oracle Anthology of Poetry (1926)
- "Symphony" Bookfellows Anthology 1926 (1926)
- Fifty Poems by American Poets Dean & Company. (1926)
- "A Life for a Life?" Fifty Poems by American Poets Dean & Company. (1927)
- "Poetry" Fifty Poems by American Poets Dean & Company. (1927)
- Blumenauer Anthology of Architectural Verse (1926)
- "Home Burial - The Father Speaks" Bookfellows Anthology 1927 (1927)
- "At Echo out in Utah" Davis Anthology of Newspaper Verse for 1927 (1928)
- An Anthology of South Dakota Poetry J.F. Olander. (1928)
- "The Humble Folk with Fish and Cake" Bookfellows Anthology 1928 (1928)
- "The Loving Cup" Bookfellows Anthology 1928 (1928)
- "Tonight" Bookfellows Anthology 1928 (1928)
- "Walled In" Bookfellows Anthology 1928 (1928)
- "The Veil" The Grub Street Book of Verse H. Harrison. (1929)
- Braithwaite's Anthology of Magazine Verse for 1929
- "White Hyacinths" An Anthology of Revolutionary Poetry (1929)
- Continental Anthologies H. Vinal. Paris. (1930)
- "Night on the Dunes" Minnesota Verse: An Anthology Times Publishing Company. (1934)
- "Stratford Hall" Contemporary American Women Poets H. Harrison (1936)
- Minnesota and Nebraska PoetsH. Harrison (1937)
- American Women Poets 1937 H. Harrison (1937)
- Davis Anthology of Newspaper Verse for 1937 (1938)
- Davis Anthology of Newspaper Verse for 1941 H. Harrison. (1942)
- To Sing Along the Way New Rivers Press (2006)

=== Poems ===
- "The American Vampire" The News and Advance August 15, 1908
- "See Welfare Committee" The Des Moines Register November 27, 1924
- "A New Year Symphony" Argus-Leader January 7, 1925
- "Death of John Coolidge" The Sioux City Journal March 23, 1926
- "To Light the Candles" The Sioux City Journal May 2, 1926
- "All Summer Hollyhocks have Smiled" The Sioux City Journal June 6, 1926
- "The Last Stand" Argus-Leader July 1, 1926
- "Dr. George Schott" The Sioux City Journal July 8, 1926
- "The Last Watch" Jacksonville Journal Courier August 3, 1927
- "Burden Sharing" The Sioux City Journal August 15, 1926
- "To all whose Loving Hands have Smoothed Our Way" The Sioux City Journal October 17, 1926
- "Phoenix" The Sioux City Journal November 4, 1926
- "A Father" The Sioux City Journal November 10, 1926
- "The Gray Poet (Whitman)" The Fresno Bee March 13, 1927
- "The Wizard of the East" The Sioux City Journal March 27, 1927
- "The Scholar President" The Sioux City Journal May 8, 1927
- "Wings to Dare" The Sioux City Journal August 27, 1927
- "Tumbleweeds" The Fresno Bee October 2, 1927
- "The Canwita Tree" Vidette-Messenger of Porter County November 10, 1927
- "Let Us Thank" Vidette-Messenger of Porter County December 17, 1927
- "Night on the Indiana Dunes" The Indianapolis Star February 10, 1929
- "How Like a Harp" The Sioux City Journal January 29, 1928
- "Prayer Amid the Poppies" Brotherhood of Locomotive Firemen and Enginemen's Magazine July 1928
- "An Age Old Reverberant Hymn" International Poetry Magazine March 1929
- "Love Wove a Wreath" International Poetry Magazine May 1929
- "What is It?" International Poetry Magazine May 1929
- "Oh, Not Till Then" The Sioux City Journal October 27, 1930
- "Books" The Palm Beach Post November 30, 1930
- "The First Snowfall" Argus-Leader November 4, 1931
- "Wanagi Sica the Painted Demon" Argus-Leader March 31, 1932
- "Minnesota Sunset" Argus-Leader October 7, 1932
- "Of Every Day" Argus-Leader October 30, 1932
- "Calvin Coolidge 1872-1933" Argus-Leader March 16, 1933
- "Apples of Gold" St. Cloud Times April 28, 1934
- "I Offer Thanks" Brainerd Dispatch November 30, 1935
- "Utility" The Palm Beach Post May 23, 1937
- "Dedication" The Austin Daily Herald November 23, 1937
- "Rispetto" The Spokane Press June 14, 1938
- "Twilight Hush" St. Cloud Times October 25, 1939
- "Fog Glimpses" The Fayette Advertiser August 20, 1940
- "Morning Sentinel" The Miller News January 29, 1942
- "Bridge to East Hartford" Hartford Courant June 28, 1942
- "Prairie Oasis" Argus-Leader April 17, 1943
- "Beyond the Sand Dunes" West Los Angeles Independent October 15, 1943
- "Overtones" The Indianapolis News June 26, 1945
- "Early November Twilight" The Anniston Star November 4, 1949
- "Peter Norbeck" Rapid City Journal June 17, 1961
- "Homely Things" The Tooele Transcript May 12, 1978
