= Winifred Hamrick Farrar =

American poet

Winifred Hamrick Farrar (5 March 1923 – 6 November 2010) was the Poet Laureate of Mississippi from 1978 to 2010.

She was born on a family farm near Collinsville. She graduated from the University of Mississippi in 1945, married Robert H. Farrar, and taught English for thirty years in public schools in Meridian. She earned a Master's degree from the University of Southern Mississippi in 1962.

She was appointed Poet Laureate on 31 July 1978 by Governor Cliff Finch.

== Works ==
- Moral intention in the work of William Faulkner: a call for positive action (1962)
- Cry Life (1968)
- The Seeking Spirit (1974)
- Behind the Ridge (1987)

== Bibliography ==
- Dorothy Abbott, ed. Mississippi Writers: Reflections of Childhood and Youth. Volume 3 of Mississippi Writers. Center for the Study of Southern Culture Series. University Press of Mississippi, 1988. Page 392.
