= Okatibbee Creek =

Stream in Mississippi, United States

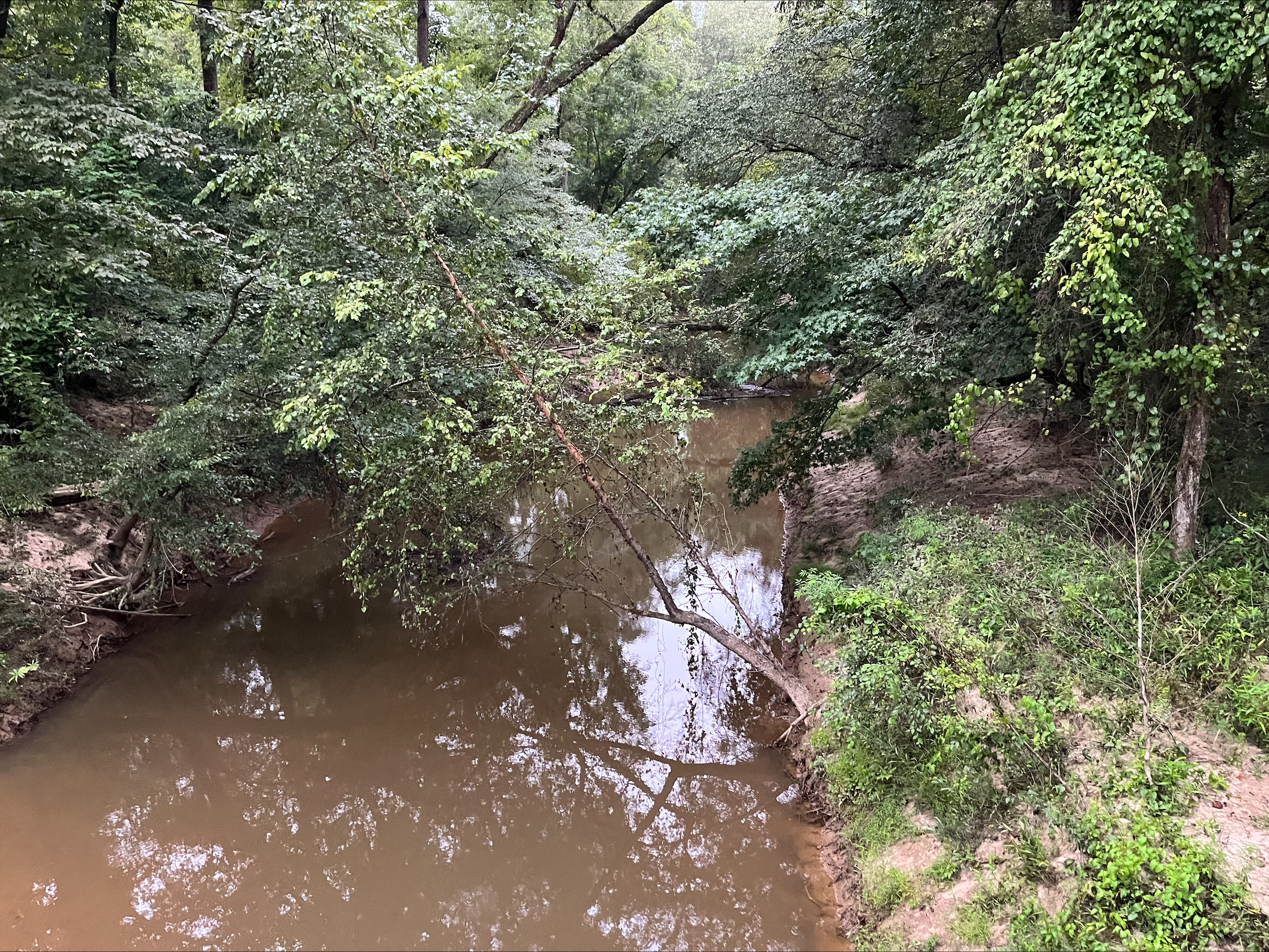
- Okatibbee Creek in Lauderdale County, Mississippi

Location
- Country: United States
- State: Mississippi

Physical characteristics
- Source
  - coordinates: 32.723468°N 88.9431104°W
- Mouth
  - coordinates: 32.1829249°N 88.8219931°W
- Length: 76.7 mi (123.4 km)
- Basin size: 540 sq mi (1,400 km^{2})

Okatibbee Creek is a stream in the U.S. state of Mississippi. Tributaries include Chickasawhay Creek, Sowashee Creek, and Suqualena Creek. Okatibbee Creek joins the Chunky River to form the Chickasawhay River, making it one of the headwater streams of the Pascagoula River Basin. Okatibbee Creek lies in the Southern Red Hills Region of the East Gulf Coastal Plain Province.

Okatibbee Dam on Okatibbee Creek impounds an 11,000-acre (45 km^{2}) reservoir, which was constructed in the 1960s for flood control. Okatibbee Dam mitigates flood damage along Okatibbee Creek and the upper reaches of the Chickasawhay River.

Okatibbee is a name derived from the Choctaw language meaning "ice therein". Many variant names or transliterations exist, including "Chickasahay Creek", "Oak-tib-be Haw Creek", "Oakitabaha Creek", "Oakitibbeha River", "Oakitibbihaha Creek", "Oakitibiha Creek", "Oaktibbeehaw River", "Oaktibbeha Creek", "Octibaha Creek", "Octibbeha Creek", "Octibha Creek", "Oka Teebehaw Creek", "Okatibaha Creek", "Okatibahah Creek", "Okattbahah Creek", "Oketibbyhaw Creek", "Oktibbeha Creek", and "Oktibea Creek".

During William Tecumseh Sherman's Meridian campaign, Major General James B. McPherson ordered troops under the command of Mortimer Dormer Leggett and Marcellus M. Crocker to defend a train bridge over Okatibbee Creek. This bridge allowed the Union Army to remain supplied during the destruction of Meridian.
