= Souenlovie Creek =

Stream in Mississippi, United States

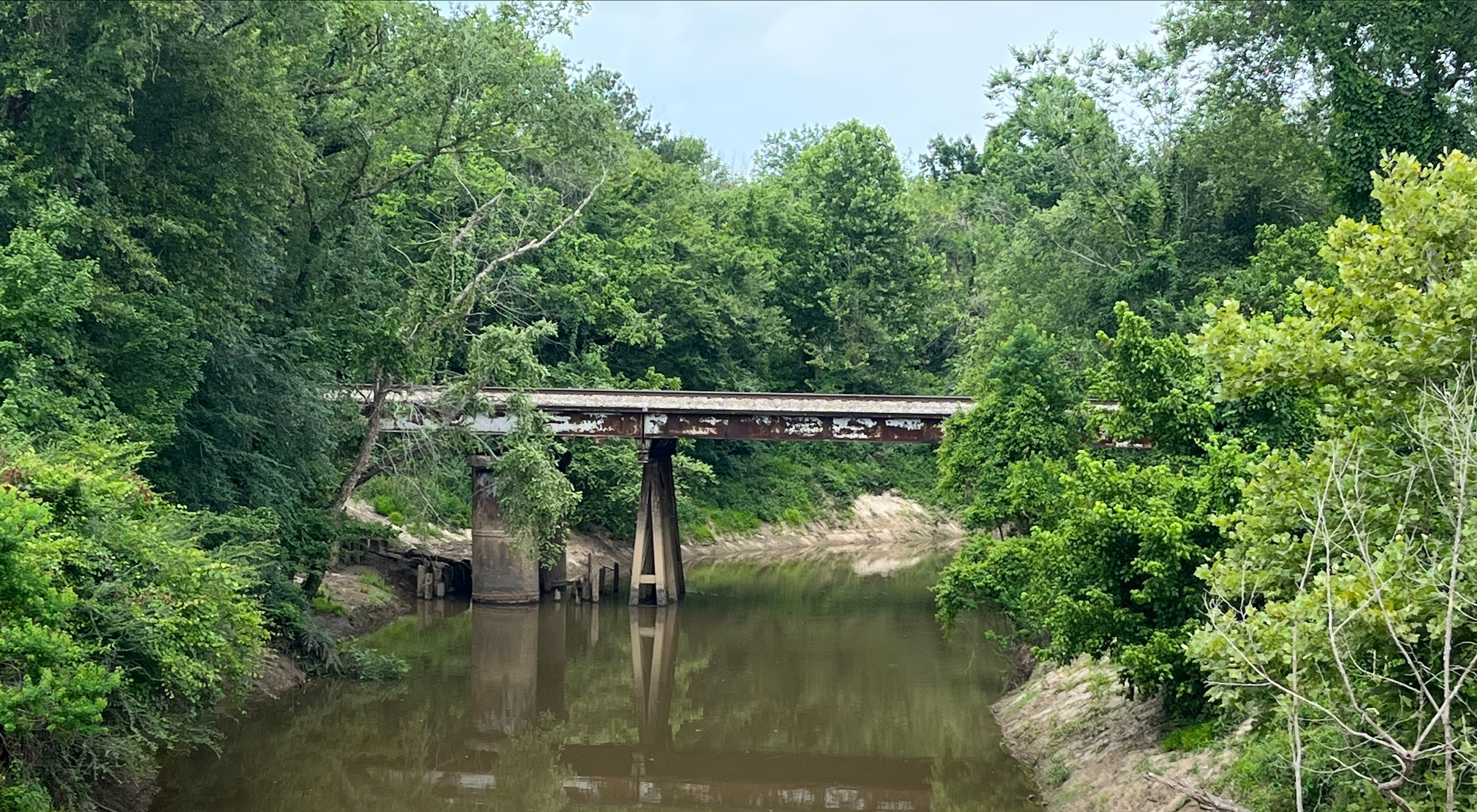
- Souenlovie Creek with a Norfolk Southern Railway bridge

Location
- Country: United States
- State: Mississippi

Physical characteristics
- Source
  - coordinates: 32.1898698°N 89.1647817°W
- Mouth
  - coordinates: 32.0351501°N 88.7550456°W
- Length: 26.3 mi (42.3 km)
- Basin size: 174 sq mi (450 km^{2})

Souenlovie Creek is a stream in the U.S. state of Mississippi. Scotchenflipper Creek is a tributary.

Souenlovie is a name derived from the Choctaw language purported to mean "leech killer". Variant names are "Ahsoombeera Creek", "Ashentoun Creek", "Hasunlovieasha Creek", and "Souinlovey Creek".
