= Scotchenflipper Creek =

Stream in Mississippi, United States

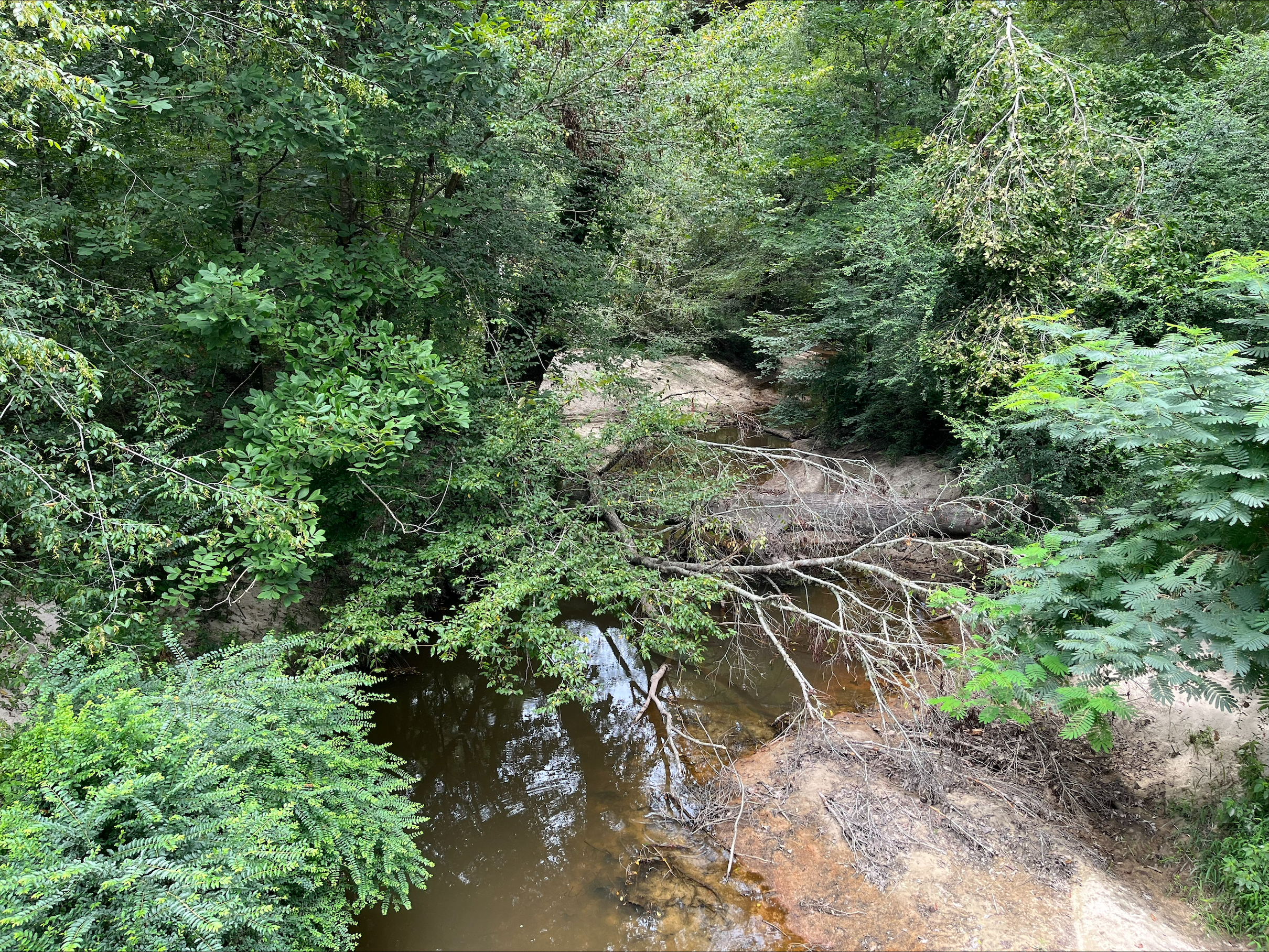
- Scotchenflipper Creek

Location
- Country: United States
- State: Mississippi

Physical characteristics
- Source
  - coordinates: 32.2118134°N 89.0278335°W
- Mouth
  - coordinates: 32.2309799°N 89.1670041°W
- Length: 9.09 mi (14.63 km)

Scotchenflipper Creek (sometimes spelled "Scotchen Flippa Creek") is a stream in the U.S. state of Mississippi. It is a tributary to Souenlovie Creek.

A variant name is "Chenokaby Creek". Chenokaby is a name derived from the Choctaw language meaning "crooked".
