= Mississippi Highway 32 =

State Highway in Mississippi

Mississippi Highway 32
- MS 32 in red, MS 32 Scenic in blue

Route information
- Maintained by MDOT
- Length: 152.0 mi (244.6 km) (144.363 mi excluding concurrencies)
- Existed: 1932–present

Major junctions
- West end: MS 1 / Great River Road in Perthshire
- US 61 / US 278 in Shelby; US 49W near Rome; US 49E in Webb; US 51 in Oakland; I-55 in Oakland; Natchez Trace Parkway in Van Vleet
- East end: MS 41 / MS 245 in Okolona

Location
- Country: United States
- State: Mississippi
- Counties: Bolivar, Sunflower, Tallahatchie, Yalobusha, Calhoun, Chickasaw

Highway system
- Mississippi State Highway System; Interstate; US; State
← MS 30	→ MS 33

Mississippi Highway 32 (MS 32) is a state highway in northern Mississippi it runs from east to west for 152.0 miles (244.6 km), serving the counties of Bolivar, Sunflower, Tallahatchie, Yalobusha, Calhoun, and Chickasaw. The publicly accessible portion of MS 32 is divided into two sections, the first of which begins near Perthshire and runs eastward to the rear entrance of the Mississippi State Penitentiary (MSP). The second section begins at the main entrance of MSP and runs eastward to MS 32's terminus in Okolona. A private portion of MS 32 runs from the main entrance of MSP to the rear entrance of MSP.

== Route description ==
MS 32 in the Mississippi Delta region in Bolivar County at an intersection with MS 1 (Great River Road) in the community of Perthshire. It heads east through rural farmland as a two-lane highway for a few miles to cross Bogue Phalia before entering the town of Shelby along S Lake Street. The highway travels northeast through neighborhoods for several blocks before making a sharp right onto W 2nd Avenue as it enters downtown. MS 32 has an intersection with MS 161 (N/S Broadway Street) before leaving downtown and passing through neighborhoods, making a left onto Martin Luther King Drive before curving right onto Parchman Road. The highway has an intersection with U.S. Route 61 (US 61) and US 278 before leaving Shelby and traveling through flat farmland for several miles to cross into Sunflower County.

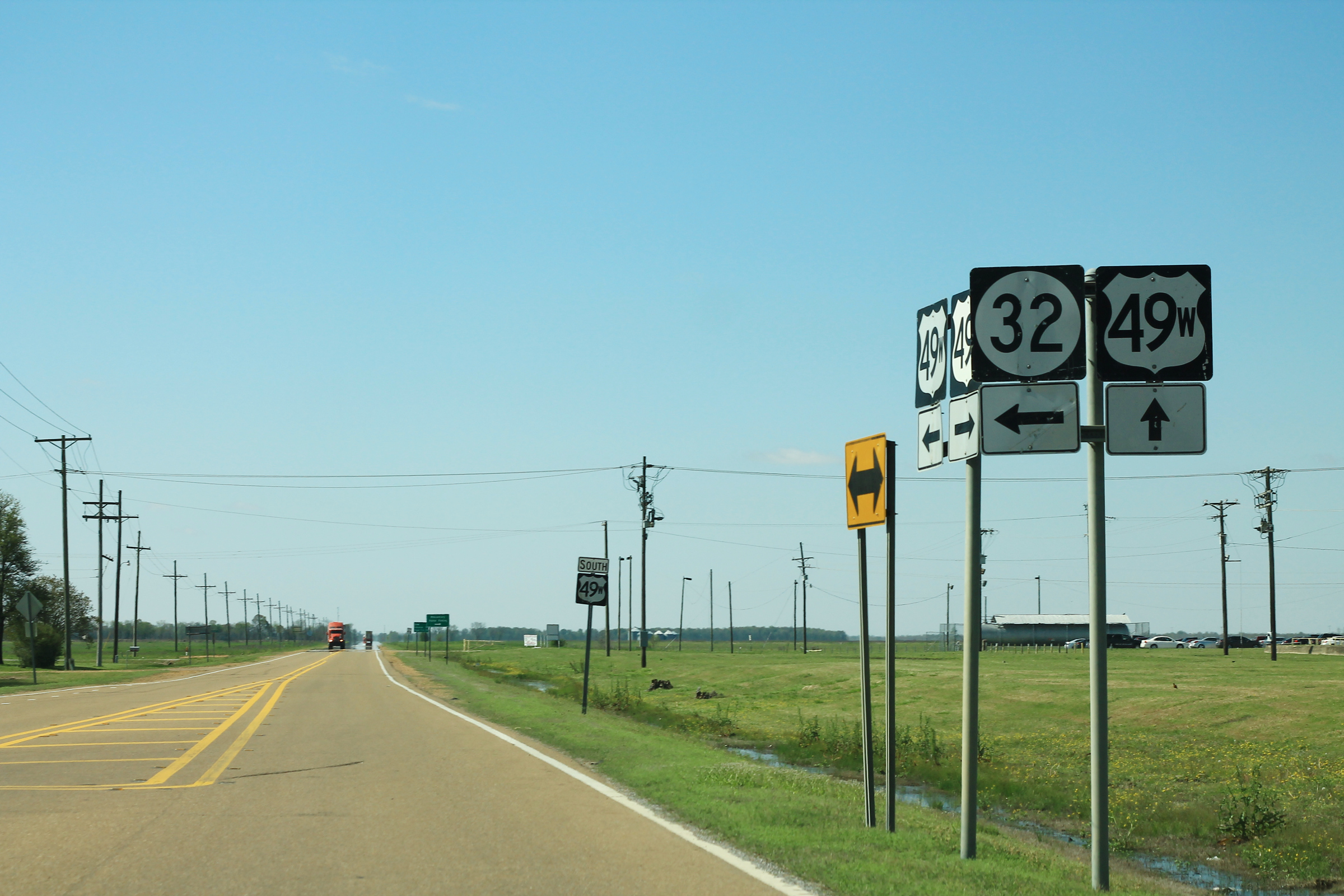
MS 32 at its intersection with US 49W (unsigned MS 3) in Parchman

MS 32 crosses the Sunflower River (near its merge with the Hushpuckena River) before having an intersection with Lombardy Road, which provides access to the communities of Roundaway and Baltzer and the town of Drew. Public access to the highway ends at the western main gate of the Mississippi State Penitentiary, located just after a bridge over a small bayou, with MS 32 continuing unsigned through the center of the prison grounds for the next 5.5 miles (8.9 km). Signage and public access begins again after a short unsigned concurrency with US 49W (unsigned MS 3), with the highway continuing east to cross the Quiver River before entering Tallahatchie County.

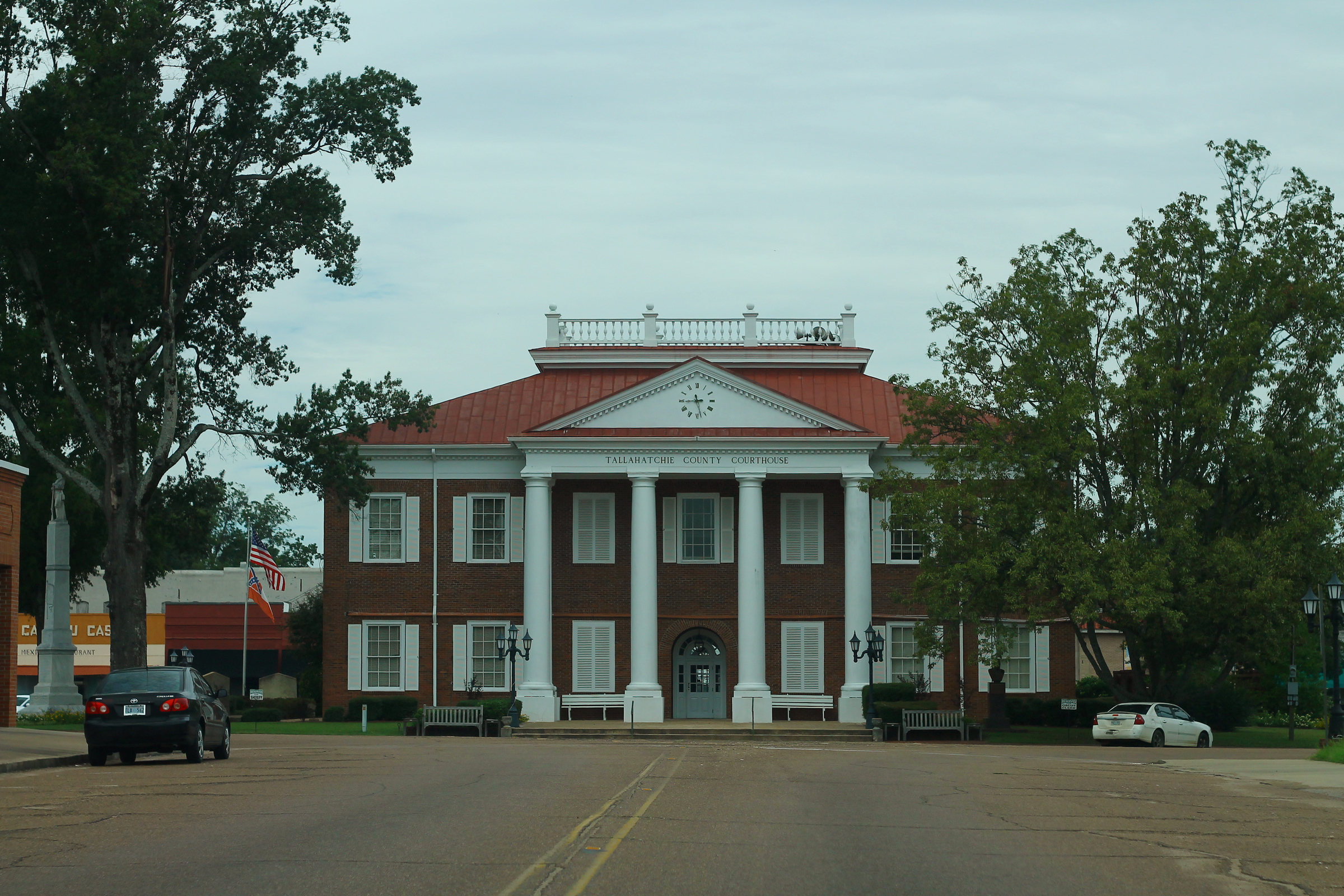
MS 32 at roundabout around the Tallahatchie County Courthouse in downtown Charleston

MS 32 winds its way eastward through farmland to pass by Blue Lake (and the community of the same name) before entering Webb and passing through neighborhoods. The highway becomes concurrent (overlapped) with US 49E for a little under a mile before splitting off along Main Street and passing straight through downtown. MS 32 crosses a bridge over Cassidy Bayou to leave Webb and have an intersection with MS 321 before crossing the Tallahatchie River and passing through Cowart. The highway becomes concurrent with MS 35 and they turn north to enter Charleston by crossing Tillatoba Creek along Clay Street. They head through some neighborhoods before the two highways split at an intersection with Main Street, MS 32 turning left into downtown. MS 32 passes eastward through downtown, going through a roundabout around the eastern Tallahatchie County Courthouse, before leaving downtown and passing through neighborhoods as a four-lane undivided highway. The highway now narrows back to two-lanes, leaves Charleston, and starts gaining elevation as it climbs some Loess bluffs out of the Delta Region into the North Central Hills of the Appalachian Mountains. It has an intersection with MS 727 (Hickory Street) on the outskirts of Oakland before crossing into Yalobusha County and entering the city limits.

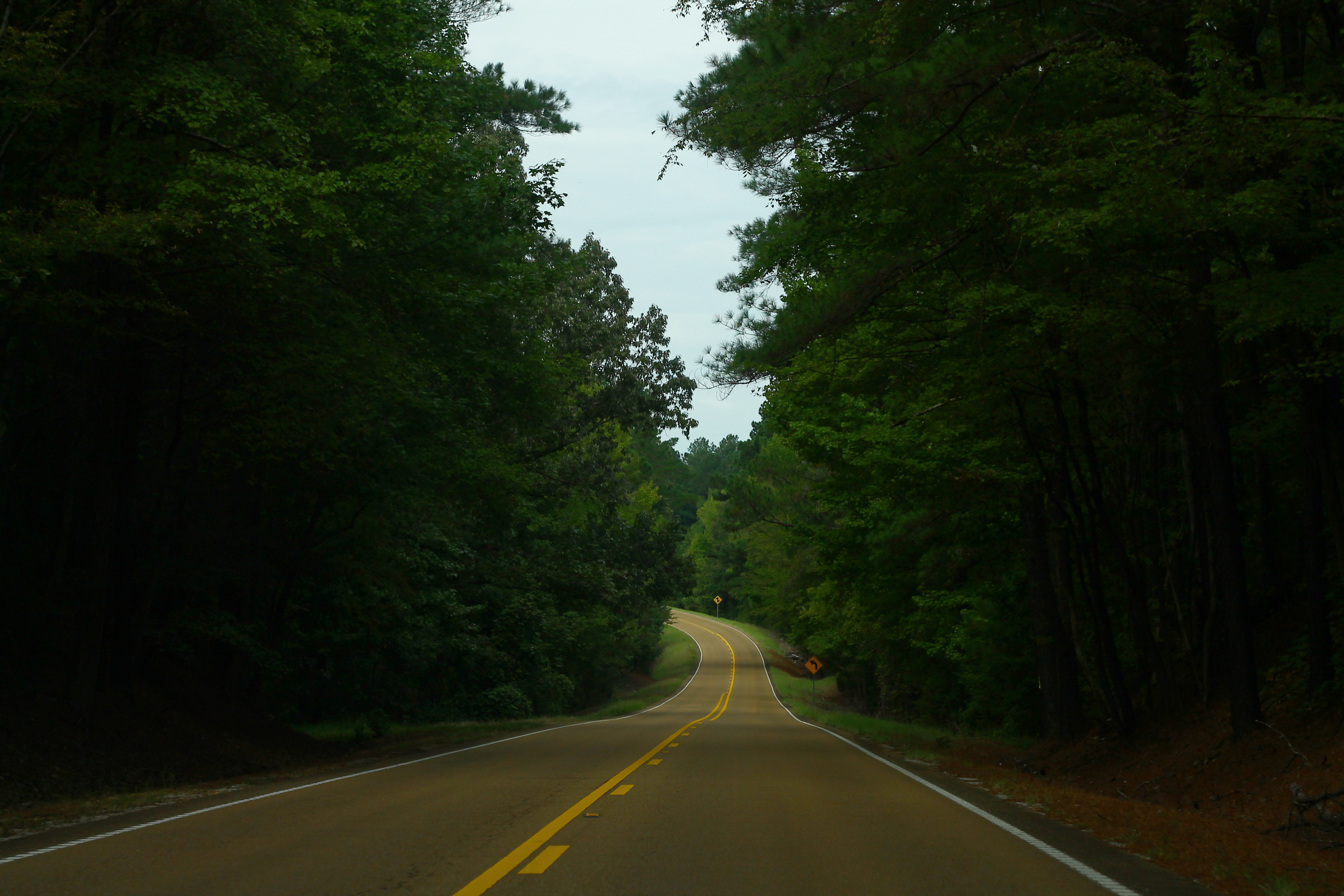
Wooded scenery along Mississippi Highway 32 in rural Yalobusha County

MS 32 bypasses the town along its north side, where it has an intersection with US 51, before leaving Oakland and having an interchange with Interstate 55 (I-55) at its exit 227. Between I-55 and US 51, MS 32 is concurrent with its scenic route, MS 32 Scenic. The highway travels through more wooded areas as it passes along the southern shoreline of Enid Lake for the next several miles, where it has an intersection County Road 170 (CR 170; provides access to George P. Cossar State Park), before traveling through the southern outskirts of Water Valley, where it has an intersection with MS 7 and a short concurrency with MS 315. MS 32 leaves the Water Valley area and winds its way through hilly woodlands for several miles to cross into Calhoun County.

MS 32 winding its way southeast to have an intersection with MS 330 before passing straight through downtown Bruce, where it has an intersection with MS 9 and goes through a roundabout. The highway travels northeast through farmland for several miles, where it has a short concurrency with MS 341, before crossing into Chickasaw County.

MS 32 continues winding its way east through mostly farmland to cross the Skuna River and Houlka Creek to pass through New Houlka before having a concurrency with MS 15 south for a few miles. The highway now heads east through hilly woodlands for several miles (part of the Tombigbee National Forest) to pass through Van Vleet, where it has an interchange with the Natchez Trace Parkway (as well as an intersection with unsigned MS 385), before traveling through flat farmland for a few miles. MS 32 now enters the Okolona city limits and becomes shortly thereafter with MS 41. They continue east for a short distance to an intersection with MS 245, where the MS 32 designation ends and MS 41 continues east (signed south) towards US 45 Alternate (US 45A) and Amory.

== Major intersections ==
County	Location	mi	km	Destinations	Notes
Bolivar	Perthshire	0.0	0.0	MS 1 / Great River Road – Gunnison, Rosedale, Clarksdale	Western terminus
Bolivar	Shelby	10.4	16.7	MS 161 (Broadway Street)	
Bolivar	Shelby	11.2	18.0	US 61 / US 278 – Mound Bayou, Duncan	
Sunflower		20.2	32.5	Lombardy Road – Roundaway, Sunflower County, Baltzer, Drew	
Sunflower	Parchman	21.8	35.1	Mississippi State Penitentiary west gate	No public access beyond this point
Mississippi State Penitentiary
Sunflower	Parchman	27.3– 27.4	43.9– 44.1	US 49W (MS 3) – Drew, Indianola, Clarksdale	
Tallahatchie		37.9	61.0	US 49E south – Greenwood	West end of US 49E overlap
Tallahatchie	Webb	38.7	62.3	US 49E north – Tutwiler, Clarksdale	East end of US 49E overlap
Tallahatchie		40.2	64.7	MS 321 north – Brazil	Southern terminus of MS 321
Tallahatchie	Cowart	49.3	79.3	Tippo Road – Effie, Tippo, Macel, Philipp	Former MS 325
Tallahatchie		55.5	89.3	MS 35 south – Holcomb	West end of MS 35 overlap
Tallahatchie	Charleston	57.5	92.5	MS 35 north – Batesville	East end of MS 35 overlap
Tallahatchie	Oakland	66.7	107.3	MS 727 north – Oakland	Southern terminus of MS 727
Yalobusha	Oakland	68.1	109.6	US 51 / MS 32 Scenic north – Batesville, Enid Dam, Oakland	Western end of MS 32 Scenic overlap
Yalobusha		69.3– 69.4	111.5– 111.7	I-55 – Memphis, Grenada MS 32 Scenic ends	I-55 exit 227; southern terminus of MS 32 Scenic
Yalobusha		71.9	115.7	CR 170 – George P. Cossar State Park	Access road into park
Yalobusha		84.7	136.3	MS 7 / MS 315 north – Oxford, Coffeeville, South Water Valley	West end of MS 315 overlap
Yalobusha	Water Valley	85.3	137.3	MS 315 south – Downtown Water Valley, Railroad Museum	East end of MS 315 overlap
Calhoun		99.6	160.3	CR 233	Proposed MS 723
Calhoun		106.9	172.0	MS 330 west – Coffeeville	Eastern terminus of MS 330
Calhoun	Bruce	109.9	176.9	MS 9 – Pontotoc, Calhoun City	
Calhoun		119.9	193.0	MS 341 north / CR 157 – Robbs	West end of MS 341 overlap
Calhoun		121.7	195.9	MS 341 south / CR 159	East end of MS 341 overlap
Chickasaw	New Houlka	133.1	214.2	MS 15 north – Pontotoc; CR 124 – Davis Lake, Owl Creek Mounds	West end of MS 15 overlap
Chickasaw		137.7	221.6	MS 15 south – Houston	East end of MS 15 overlap
Chickasaw	Van Vleet	142.4	229.2	Natchez Trace Parkway	Interchange
Chickasaw	Van Vleet	143.1– 143.2	230.3– 230.5	MS 385 south – Van Vleet, Buena Vista	Northern terminus of unsigned MS 385
Chickasaw	Okolona	151.6	244.0	MS 41 north – Pontotoc	West end of MS 41 overlap
Chickasaw	Okolona	152.0	244.6	MS 41 south to US 45 Alt. – Amory; MS 245 – Tupelo, West Point	East end of MS 41 overlap; eastern terminus
1.000 mi = 1.609 km; 1.000 km = 0.621 mi: Concurrency terminus

== Scenic route ==
Mississippi Highway 32 Scenic
- Location: Oakland to near Pope
- Length: 9.0 mi (14.5 km)

Mississippi Highway 32 Scenic (MS 32 Scenic) is a 9.0-mile-long (14.5 km) scenic route of MS 32 in northwestern Yalobusha County, Mississippi. It serves to provide access to and from Enid Dam.

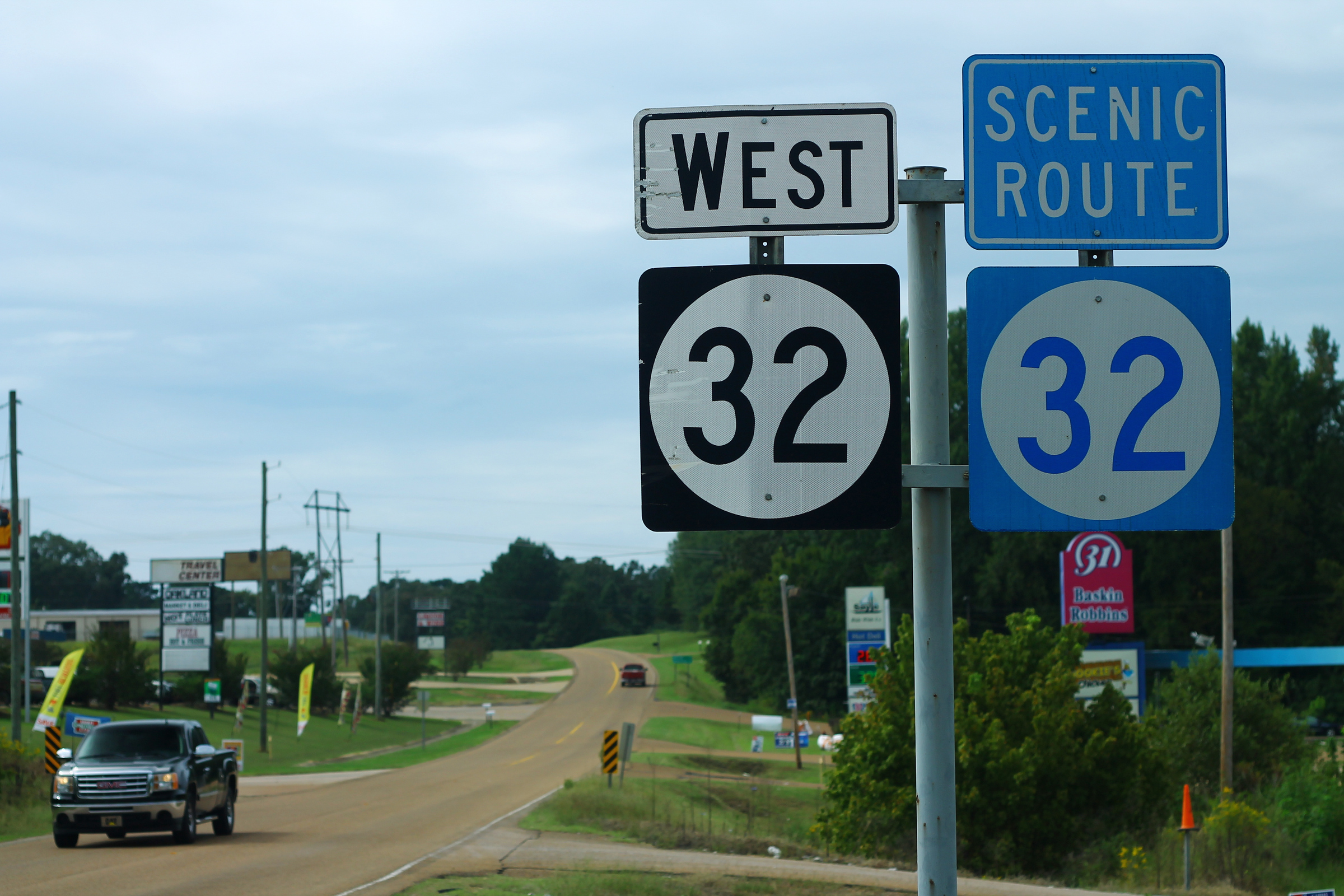
Shield for MS 32 Scenic along its concurrency (overlap) with MS 32 in Oakland

MS 32 Scenic begins, concurrent with MS 32, at an interchange with I-55 (Exit 227) on the outskirts of Oakland, with the two highways heading west past some roadside businesses and then some woodlands. The highway now enters the city limits proper, MS 32 scenic splitting off almost immediately and begins following US 51 north after an intersection with that highway. They head north to leave Oakland and travel through farmland, then wooded areas, for a few miles to the community of Enid, where they have an intersection with MS 724 (Enid-Teasdale Road) before MS 32 Scenic splits off on its own along Enid Dam Road (County Road 35 (CR 35)). The highway heads northeast through a neighborhood before leaving Enid and crossing over I-55 (without an interchange). MS 32 scenic begins following CR 36 before crossing Yocona River via directly overtop of Enid Dam. The highway now makes a sharp left turn to the west as it passes by several campgrounds, beach areas, picnic areas, and the North Mississippi Fish Hatchery. MS 32 Scenic crosses a bridge over the dam's spillway before having another interchange with I-55 (Exit 233) and coming to an end shortly thereafter at another intersection with US 51.

The entire route is in Yalobusha County.

Location	mi	km	Destinations	Notes
	0.0– 0.1	0.0– 0.16	I-55 – Grenada, Memphis MS 32 east – Water Valley	Southern terminus; southern end of MS 32 concurrency; I-55 exit 227
Oakland	1.3	2.1	US 51 south – Grenada, Oakland MS 32 east – Charleston	Northern end of MS 32 concurrency; southern end of US 51 concurrency
Enid	5.4	8.7	MS 724 west (Enid-Teasdale Road) – Enid	Eastern terminus of MS 724
Enid	5.6	9.0	US 51 north – Batesville	Northern end of US 51 concurrency
	8.8– 8.9	14.2– 14.3	I-55 – Grenada, Memphis	I-55 exit 233
	9.0	14.5	US 51 – Oakland, Courtland, Batesville	Northern terminus
1.000 mi = 1.609 km; 1.000 km = 0.621 mi: Concurrency terminus
