= List of Wildlife Management Areas in Mississippi =

There are 54 areas with over a thousand square miles of land under management of the Mississippi Department of Wildlife, Fisheries, and Parks and operated as Wildlife Management Areas (WMAs) in six regions:

- Delta Region contains 14 WMAs
- East Central Region contains 7 WMAs
- North East Region contains 6 WMAs
- North West Region contains 6 WMAs
- South East Region contains 10 WMAs
- South West Region contains 10 WMAs

== List of Wildlife Management Areas ==
Name	County or counties	Area	Description	Region
Bienville Wildlife Management Area	Scott County	26,136 acres	Bienville, Tallahalla; and Caney Creek WMAs are all located within Bienville National Forest. Closest town is Morton.	Southwest Region
Black Prairie Wildlife Management Area	Lowndes County	5,673 acres	Nearest town: Brooksville	East-central Region
Calhoun County Wildlife Management Area	Calhoun County	10,900 acres	Nearest city: Calhoun City	Northwest Region
Canal Section Wildlife Management Area	Itawamba County and Monroe County	26,000 acres	Nearest city: Fulton	Northeast Region
Canemount Wildlife Management Area	Claiborne County	3,587 acres	Near the Mississippi River	Southwest Region
Caney Creek Wildlife Management Area	Smith County and Scott County	28,000 acres	Nearest city: Forest	Southwest Region
Caston Creek Wildlife Management Area	Amite County and Franklin County	29,875 acres	Nearest city: Meadville	Southwest Region
Charles Ray Nix Wildlife Management Area	Panola County	4,000 acres	Nearest city: Sardis	Northwest Region
Charlie Capps Wildlife Management Area	Bolivar County	600 acres	Nearest city: Rosedale	Delta Region
Chickasaw Wildlife Management Area	Chickasaw County	27,259 acres	Nearest city: Houston	Northeast Region
Chickasawhay Wildlife Management Area	Jones County	30,000 acres	Nearest city: Laurel	Southeast Region
Choctaw Wildlife Management Area	Choctaw County and Winston County	24,314 acres	Nearest city: Ackerman	East-central Region
Copiah County Wildlife Management Area	Copiah County	6,810 acres	Nearest city: Hazlehurst	Southwest Region
George P. Cossar State Park		650 acres	The WMA is situated on Enid Lake that holds the world record crappie being caught.	
Divide Section Wildlife Management Area	Tishomingo County and Prentiss County	15,337 acres	Located in the northeast corner of the state the WMA lies on both sides of the Tennessee-Tombigbee Waterway (TTW) stretching from the Yellow Creek arm of Pickwick Lake on the Tennessee River, southward to Bay Springs Lake.	Northeast Region
Graham Lake Waterfowl Wildlife Management Area	Lafayette County	1,400 acres	Located on the extreme southeast corner of Sardis Lake with Holly Springs National Forest to the east.	Northwest Region
Hell Creek Wildlife Management Area	Union County and Tippah County	2,284 acres		Northeast Region
Howard Miller Wildlife Management Area	Issaquena County	2,420 acres		Delta Region
John Bell Williams Wildlife Management Area	Itawamba County (10%) and Prentiss County (90%)	3,135 acres	Established in 1973 and located four miles east of Marietta.	Northeast Region
John W Starr Wildlife Management Area	Oktibbeha County and Winston County	8,244 acres	Nearest city: Starkville. The addition of a MSU Hunting and Trapping Permit is also required.	East-central Region
Lake George Wildlife Management Area	Yazoo County	8,383 acres	Lake George became a WMA in 1990. Nearest city: Holly Bluff	Delta Region
Leaf River Wildlife Management Area	Perry County	42,000 acres	Near Wiggins	Southeast Region
Leroy Percy Wildlife Management Area	Washington County	1,642 acres	6 miles west of Hollandale	Delta Region
Little Biloxi Wildlife Management Area	Stone County and Harrison County	14,540 acres	Near McHenry.	Southeast Region
Mahannah Wildlife Management Area	Issaquena County and Warren County	12,675 acres	Near Redwood	Delta Region
Malmaison Wildlife Management Area	Grenada County, Carroll County, and Leflore County	9,696 acres	Near Greenwood	Northwest Region
Marion County Wildlife Management Area	Marion County	7,200 acres	Near Columbia	Southwest Region
Mason Creek Wildlife Management Area	Greene County	28,000 acres	Near Laurel	Southeast Region
Muscadine Farms Wildlife Management Area	Washington County	3,046 acres	Near Greenville	Delta Region
Nanih Waiya Wildlife Management Area	Neshoba County and Winston County	7,655 acres	Near Philadelphia	East-central Region
Natchez State Park Wildlife Management Area	Adams County	2,261 acres		Southwest Region
Okatibbee Wildlife Management Area	Lauderdale County and Kemper County	6,883 acres	The land for the WMA was purchased in the 1960s and Okatibbee Lake was formed in 1968 and the fragmented WMA established around the lake since 1969. American alligators were re-established in the 1970s and Bald eagles in 1992. The WMA is Near Collinsville.	-
O’Keefe Wildlife Management Area	Quitman County	6,239 acres	Near Lambert the property was purchased in 2001 from the Mississippi Department of Corrections. 1,535 acres are dedicated to various wetlands.	Delta Region
Old River Wildlife Management Area	Pearl River County	14,764 acres	The WMA is located near Poplarville.	Southeast Region
Pascagoula River Wildlife Management Area	George County and Jackson County	36,549 acres	The WMA is located near Lucedale and consists of the Upper unit and the Lower unit.	Southeast Region
Pearl River Wildlife Management Area	Madison County	6,925 acres	The WMA is located near Canton.	Southwest Region
Red Creek Wildlife Management Area	Stone, George and Jackson Counties	22,789 acres	Located near Wiggins	Southeast Region
Riverfront Wildlife Management Area	Bolivar County.	1,214 acres		Delta Region
Sandy Creek Wildlife Management Area	Adams County and Franklin County	16,407 acres	Location near Natchez	Southwest Region
Sardis Waterfowl Wildlife Management Area	Lafayette County	3,700 acres	Located near Oxford along Sardis Lake.	Northwest Region
Shipland Wildlife Management Area	Issaquena County	3,642	Located near Mayersville	Delta Region
Sky Lake Wildlife Management Area	Humphreys County and Leflore County	4,306 acres	Located near Belzoni	Delta Region
Stoneville Wildlife Management Area	Washington County	2,500 acres	Located near Leland	Delta Region
Sunflower Wildlife Management Area	Sharkey County	58,480 acres	Located near Rolling Fork	Delta Region
Tallahala Wildlife Management Area	Scott County, Newton County, Smith County, and Jasper County	28,120 acres	Located near Montrose	Southwest Region
Theodore A. Mars Jr. Wildlife Management Area	Pearl River County	896 acres	Located near Poplarville	Southeast Region
Trim Cane Wildlife Management Area	Oktibbeha County	891 acres	Located near Starkville	East-central Region
Tuscumbia Wildlife Management Area	Alcorn County	2,436 acres	Located near Corinth	Northeast Region
Twin Oaks Wildlife Management Area	Sharkey County	5,847 acres	Located near Rolling Fork, forty miles north of Vicksburg.	Delta Region
Upper Sardis Wildlife Management Area	Lafayette County	42,274 acres	Located east of Oxford within Holly Springs National Forest	Northwest Region
Ward Bayou Wildlife Management Area	Jackson County	13,234 acres	Located near Moss Point	Southeast Region
William C. (Billy) Deviney Wildlife Management Area		1,203 acres		Delta Region
Wolf River Wildlife Management Area	Lamar County and Pearl River County	10,881 acres	Located near Poplarville	Southeast Region
Yockanookany Wildlife Management Area	Attala County	2,379 acres	Located near McCool	East-central Region

== Chronic Wasting Disease ==
Chronic Wasting Disease has been discovered in Alcorn, Benton, Carroll, DeSoto, Lafayette, Leflore, Grenada, Issaquena, Lee, Marshall, Panola, Pontotoc, Prentiss, Quitman, the southern half of Sharkey, Sunflower, Tallahatchie, Tate, Tippah, Union, Warren, and Yalobusha, counties.
