= Leverett, Mississippi =

- Unincorporated community
- Location within Mississippi Location within the United States
- Coordinates: 33°52′58″N 90°04′32″W
- Country: United States
- State: Mississippi
- County: Tallahatchie
- Elevation: 154 ft (47 m)
- Time zone: UTC-6 (Central (CST))
  - Summer (DST): UTC-5 (CDT)
- ZIP code: 38920
- Area code: 662
- GNIS feature ID: 672412

Leverett is an unincorporated community located in Tallahatchie County, Mississippi, United States. Leverett is approximately 3.5 miles (5.6 km) south of Paynes, 7.4 miles (11.9 km) southeast of Tippo and 5.4 miles (8.7 km) northwest of Cascilla.

Leverett is located on Leverett Lane near Mississippi Highway 35.

Leverett has a ZIP code of 38920.

In 1900, Leverett had a population of 30.

The Leverett soil series is named for the community.
