= Strider Academy =

Segregation academy in Mississippi

Location
- 3698 MS Highway 32 Central; Charleston, Mississippi 38921; United States; 33°58′13″N 90°14′02″W

Information
- Type: Private school
- Motto: Attitude Determines Altitude
- Established: 1971
- Closed: 2018
- Grades: PK-12
- Enrollment: 72 (2016)
- Website: strideracademy.wordpress.com

Strider Academy was a PK-12 school in Tallahatchie County, Mississippi, United States, which operated from 1971 until 2018. The school was established in 1971 as a segregation academy to allow white parents to avoid sending their children to racially integrated public schools. The school was sited on Mississippi Highway 32, about 10 miles (16 km) west of Charleston and about 8 miles (13 km) north of Tippo. The school ceased operations at the end of the 2017–18 school year.

== History ==
Strider Academy was founded in 1971 as a segregation academy and was an accredited member of the Mississippi Association of Independent Schools.

The school was said to be named after Clarence Strider, the Tallahatchie County Sheriff who obstructed the investigation of the 1955 lynching of Emmett Till in a successful attempt to acquit the murderers.

The school campus suffered two fires in two weeks in August 1977. The main building and the field house were both destroyed. The FBI was involved in the investigation.

In 1989, Greenwood public schools trustee Jeff Milman of Tippo resigned after the NAACP protested his decision to enroll his children in Strider Academy instead of racially integrated public schools. Milman stated that his children wanted to attend Strider and that it was closer to his residence.

In 1993, the school did not receive an increase in admissions from Greenwood parents; at the time white parents were concerned about a plan to put all students in the same middle school in Greenwood. By that year the school was air conditioned.

In 1999, it started an elementary school level daycare program.

As of 2016, the school's students were 96% white, but Tallahatchie County was 54% black. Filings for the 2015–16 school year indicates that all seventy-two students at the school were white. In July 2018, the school announced it would not reopen for the following school year.
