= Midway, Tallahatchie County, Mississippi =

Midway, Mississippi
- Ghost town
- Location within Mississippi
- Coordinates: 33°59′24″N 90°17′57″W
- Country: United States
- State: Mississippi
- County: Tallahatchie
- Elevation: 151 ft (46 m)
- GNIS feature ID: 708146

Midway is a ghost town in Tallahatchie County, Mississippi, United States. Midway was located on the Cassidy Bayou 4.2 miles (6.8 km) east-northeast of Sumner.

Midway is named for the fact it was located between two plantations.

The site of the community is located along the Canadian National Railway.
