= Joseph Burton Sumner =

American settler

Joseph Burton Sumner (October 11, 1837 – February 15, 1920) was a figure in the founding of Sumner, Mississippi. Sumner and his family moved to Tallahatchie County, Mississippi from Alabama around January, 1872. J. B. Sumner built the first general store and post office in the town that was later named for him in 1885, where he became the first postmaster. He donated the land for the right-of-way and park to the railroad company in 1888. When Sumner incorporated in 1900, J. B. Sumner was elected the first mayor. He donated the lots for the first jail and the courthouse built in 1902. He taught his own children and the children of his tenants at a school located between Sumner and Webb, Mississippi. Sumner later moved to Bentonville, Arkansas with his daughter.

Before moving to Mississippi Sumner had served in the 22nd AL Volunteer Infantry, Company A in the Confederate States of America Army and was wounded during the operations before the Battle of Stones River near Murfreesboro, Tennessee the evening of December 31, 1862.

Sumner is buried in his family cemetery, Indian Mound Cemetery.
