= Teasdale, Mississippi =

- Unincorporated community
- Location within Mississippi Location within the United States
- Coordinates: 34°06′57″N 90°01′20″W
- Country: United States
- State: Mississippi
- County: Tallahatchie
- Elevation: 361 ft (110 m)
- Time zone: UTC-6 (Central (CST))
  - Summer (DST): UTC-5 (CDT)
- ZIP code: 38927
- Area code: 662
- GNIS feature ID: 686891

Teasdale is an unincorporated community located in Tallahatchie County, Mississippi. Teasdale is approximately 6 miles (9.7 km) west of Enid and approximately 9 miles (14 km) north of Charleston.

A post office operated under the name Teasdale from 1882 to 1907.

The community once had an elementary school that served grades 1–8.

In 1900, Teasdale had a population of 36.

The Teasdale Lookout Tower is listed on the National Historic Lookout Register.
