= Sharkey, Mississippi =

- Unincorporated community
- Location within Mississippi Location within the United States
- Coordinates: 33°54′18″N 90°15′53″W
- Country: United States
- State: Mississippi
- County: Tallahatchie
- Elevation: 148 ft (45 m)
- Time zone: UTC-6 (Central (CST))
  - Summer (DST): UTC-5 (CDT)
- ZIP code: 38921
- Area code: 662
- GNIS feature ID: 686881

Sharkey is an unincorporated community located in Tallahatchie County, Mississippi, United States. Sharkey is approximately 5.2 miles (8.4 km) west of Tippo and 4.6 miles (7.4 km) southwest of Swan Lake along Sharkey Road on the Tallahatchie River.

A post office operated under the name Sharkey from 1877 to 1930.
