= Effie, Mississippi =

- Unincorporated community
- Location within Mississippi Location within the United States
- Coordinates: 33°56′05″N 90°10′38″W
- Country: United States
- State: Mississippi
- County: Tallahatchie
- Elevation: 148 ft (45 m)
- Time zone: UTC-6 (Central (CST))
  - Summer (DST): UTC-5 (CDT)
- ZIP code: 38921
- Area code: 662
- GNIS feature ID: 669691

Effie is an unincorporated community located in Tallahatchie County, Mississippi. Effie is located on Tippo Road approximately 2 miles (3.2 km) north of Tippo and approximately 3.5 miles (5.6 km) south of Cowart.
