= George Payne Cossar =

American lawyer and politician

George Payne Cossar, Sr (26 August 1907 – 1 May 1992) was an American lawyer and politician. He served as a member of the Mississippi House of Representatives from 1948 to 1980.

== Early life ==
Cossar was born in Webb, Tallahatchie County, Mississippi 26 August 1907. He was the son of John Harper Cossar and Lottie L. Thompson. Cossar attended Charleston High School. He graduated from University of Mississippi Law School in 1931.

== Career ==
Cossar held a law licence in Tallahatchie County from 1931 to his death in 1992.

Cossar was elected to the Mississippi House of Representatives as a Democrat in 1948 and served for 32 years until 1980. He was an alternate delegate to Democratic National Convention from Mississippi in 1956.

== Death and legacy ==
Cossar died on 1 May 1992 in Tallahatchie, Mississippi, age 84. His son George Payne Cossar, Jr also became a lawyer in 1960 in Tallahatchie County.

In March 1979, Gov. Cliff Finch signed a bill renaming Yocona Ridge State Park in Oakland, Mississippi to George P. Cossar State Park.
