= Whitehead, Mississippi =

- Unincorporated community
- Location within Mississippi Location within the United States
- Coordinates: 33°50′55″N 90°17′55″W
- Country: United States
- State: Mississippi
- County: Tallahatchie
- Elevation: 144 ft (44 m)
- Time zone: UTC-6 (Central (CST))
  - Summer (DST): UTC-5 (CDT)
- ZIP code: 38928
- Area code: 662
- GNIS feature ID: 692317

Whitehead is an unincorporated community located in Tallahatchie County, Mississippi. Whitehead is located on Swan Lake Road, approximately 1 mile (1.6 km) north of Glendora and 2.5 miles (4.0 km) south of Swan Lake.

== Transportation ==
Amtrak’s City of New Orleans, which operates between New Orleans and Chicago, passes through the town on CN tracks, but makes no stop. The nearest station is located in Greenwood, 29 miles (47 km) to the south.
