= Patti Carr Black =

American non-fiction writer

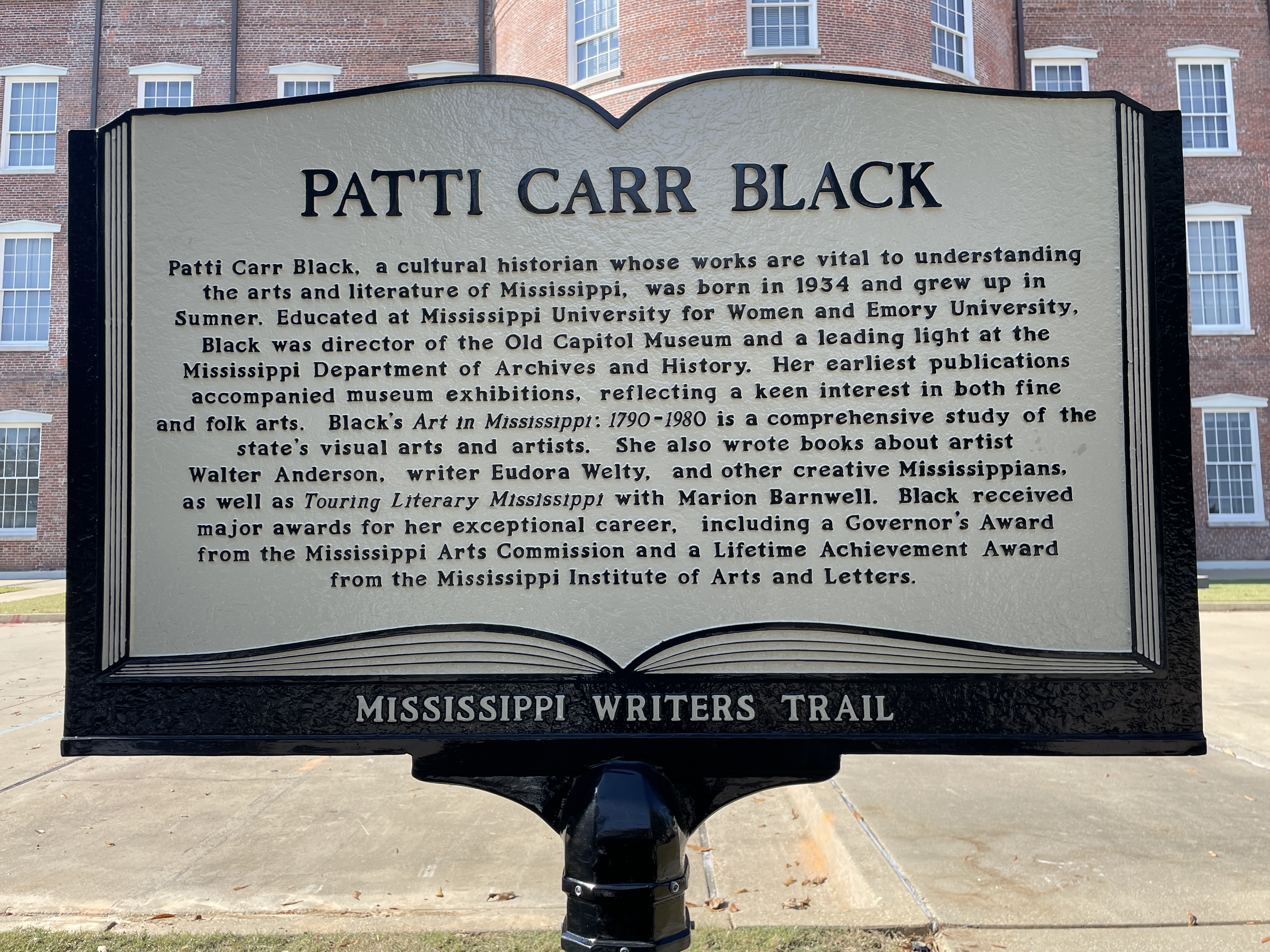
- Mississippi Writers Trail marker
- Born: 1934 (age 91–92); Sumner, Mississippi, U.S.
- Education: Mississippi University for Women; Emory University
- Occupation: Author

Patti Carr Black is an American non-fiction writer. She has authored many books about the history and culture of Mississippi.

== Life ==
Black was born in Sumner, Mississippi. She graduated from the Mississippi University for Women in 1955 and she earned a master's degree from Emory University.

Black has authored many books about the history and culture of Mississippi. She is the recipient of the Noel Polk Lifetime Achievement Award from the Mississippi Institute of Arts and Letters, the Mississippi Governor's Award for Excellence in the Arts/Career in the Arts, and an honorary doctorate from her alma mater, the Mississippi University for Women.

Black resides in the Belhaven Neighborhood of Jackson, Mississippi.

In June 2025, Black was honored with a Mississippi Writers Trail Marker. The unveiling took place at the Old Capitol Museum where she was the director of the museum.

== Selected works ==
- Black, Patti Carr, ed. (1982). Documentary Portrait of Mississippi: The Thirties. Jackson, Mississippi: University Press of Mississippi. ISBN 9780878051663. OCLC 8346435.
- Black, Patti Carr (1985). The Natchez Trace. Jackson, Mississippi: University Press of Mississippi. ISBN 9780878052264. OCLC 10694673.
- Black, Patti Carr (2002). Touring Literary Mississippi. Jackson, Mississippi: University Press of Mississippi. ISBN 9781578063673. OCLC 48851183.
- Black, Patti Carr (2007). Dietrick, Robin C. (ed.). The Mississippi Story. Jackson, Mississippi: Mississippi Museum of Art. ISBN 9781887422147. OCLC 86090473.
- Black, Patti Carr (2008). Breathing Art: The Lives and Art of Myra Hamilton Green and Lynn Green Root. Jackson, Mississippi: Mississippi Museum of Art. ISBN 9781887422161. OCLC 909896738.
