= Crevi, Mississippi =

- Ghost town
- Location within the state of Mississippi
- Coordinates: 34°02′45″N 90°02′55″W
- Country: United States
- State: Mississippi
- County: Tallahatchie
- Elevation: 233 ft (71 m)
- Time zone: UTC-6 (Central (CST))
  - Summer (DST): UTC-5 (CDT)
- GNIS feature ID: 708134

Crevi (also Mitchells Cross Roads) is a ghost town in Tallahatchie County, Mississippi, United States.

Crevi was located approximately 3 mi (4.8 km) northeast of Charleston.

In 1876, the United States government established a postal road between Crevi and Friars Point, Mississippi.

Crevi had a post office, and in 1900, a population of 21.
