= Needmore, Mississippi =

- Ghost town
- Location within the state of Mississippi
- Coordinates: 33°52′56″N 90°10′08″W
- Country: United States
- State: Mississippi
- County: Tallahatchie
- Elevation: 144 ft (44 m)
- Time zone: UTC-6 (Central (CST))
  - Summer (DST): UTC-5 (CDT)
- GNIS feature ID: 708149

Needmore is a ghost town in Tallahatchie County, Mississippi, United States.

Needmore was located on the west bank of the Tippo Bayou, approximately 10 mi (16 km) southwest of Charleston.

The settlement had a post office, school, church and cemetery. The Needmore Cemetery is all that remains.
