= Cowart, Mississippi =

- Unincorporated community
- Location within Mississippi Location within the United States
- Coordinates: 33°59′06″N 90°10′40″W
- Country: United States
- State: Mississippi
- County: Tallahatchie
- Elevation: 148 ft (45 m)
- Time zone: UTC-6 (Central (CST))
  - Summer (DST): UTC-5 (CDT)
- ZIP code: 38921
- Area code: 662
- GNIS feature ID: 708132

Cowart is an unincorporated community located in Tallahatchie County, Mississippi. Cowart is located on Mississippi Highway 32 approximately 5 miles (8.0 km) north of Tippo and approximately 8 miles (13 km) west of Charleston.
