= Macel, Mississippi =

- Unincorporated community
- Location within Mississippi Location within the United States
- Coordinates: 33°49′20″N 90°09′47″W
- Country: United States
- State: Mississippi
- County: Tallahatchie
- Elevation: 141 ft (43 m)
- Time zone: UTC-6 (Central (CST))
  - Summer (DST): UTC-5 (CDT)
- ZIP code: 38950
- Area code: 662
- GNIS feature ID: 673042

Macel is an unincorporated community located in Tallahatchie County, Mississippi. Macel is approximately 6.7 miles (10.8 km) south of Tippo and approximately 6.7 miles (10.8 km) north-northeast of Philipp on Tippo Road.

Macel is named from Macel Willingham, the daughter of a local landowner.

A post office operated under the name Macel from 1908 to 1955.

Macel is located on the former Illinois Central Gulf Railroad and in 1920 had a population of 100.
