= Maxwell Street Jimmy Davis =

American blues singer, guitarist and songwriter (1925–1995)

- Also known as: Jewtown Jimmy
- Born: Charles W. Thompson; March 2, 1925; Tippo, Mississippi, U.S.
- Died: December 28, 1995 (aged 70) Chicago, Illinois, U.S.
- Genres: Electric blues; country blues
- Occupations: Musician; songwriter
- Instruments: Guitar; vocals
- Years active: 1940s–1995

Charles W. Thompson (March 2, 1925 – December 28, 1995), known as Maxwell Street Jimmy Davis, was an American electric blues singer, guitarist, and songwriter. He played with John Lee Hooker, recorded an album for Elektra Records in the mid-1960s, and remained a regular street musician on Maxwell Street, in Chicago, for over 40 years. He is best remembered for his songs "Cold Hands" and "4th and Broad". He was also known as Jewtown Jimmy.

== Biography ==
Davis was born Charles W. Thompson, in Tippo, Mississippi. In his teens, he learned to play the guitar from John Lee Hooker, and the two of them played concerts together in Detroit in the 1940s, following Davis's relocation there in 1946. Prior to his move to Detroit, he had worked in traveling minstrel shows, including the Rabbit Foot Minstrels. Davis lived for nearly a year in Cincinnati, Ohio, before he moved to Chicago in 1953. He started performing regularly in the marketplace area of Maxwell Street, playing a traditional and electrified style of Mississippi blues.

In 1952, he recorded two songs, "Cold Hands" and "4th and Broad", under his real name, for Sun Records. They were offered to Chess Records and Bullet Records but were not released.

It is uncertain when he took the name Jimmy Davis, but in 1964, under that pseudonym, he recorded a couple of tracks for Testament Records. They appeared on the 1965 Testament compilation album Modern Chicago Blues. His songs were "Crying Won't Make Me Stay" and "Hanging Around My Door". The album also included a track from another Chicago street performer, John Lee Granderson, and more established artists, such as Robert Nighthawk, Big Walter Horton, and Johnny "Man" Young. The music journalist Tony Russell wrote that it was "music of great charm and honesty".

In 1966, Davis recorded a self-titled album for Elektra Records, which Jason Ankeny, writing for Allmusic, called "a fine showcase for his powerful guitar skills and provocative vocals". He recorded several tracks for various labels over the years, without commercial success.

Davis owned a small restaurant on Maxwell Street, the Knotty Pine Grill, and performed outside the premises in the summer. He continued to play alfresco on Chicago's West Side for decades. In July 1994, Wolf Records released the album Chicago Blues Session, Vol. 11, the tracks of which Davis had recorded in 1988 and 1989. The collection included Lester Davenport on harmonica and Kansas City Red playing the drums.

Davis died of a heart attack in December 1995, in his adopted hometown of Chicago. He was 70 years old. In 2016 the Killer Blues Headstone Project placed a headstone for him at Burr Oak Cemetery in Alsip, Illinois.

A 1989 photograph of Davis performing on Maxwell Street appeared on the front cover of BluesSpeak: The Best of the Original Chicago Blues Annual, published in 2010.

== Discography ==
=== Albums ===
Album title	Record label	Year of release
Maxwell Street Jimmy Davis	Elektra Records	1965
Chicago Blues Session, Vol. 11	Wolf Records	1989

=== Compilation albums ===
Album title	Record label	Year of release
Modern Chicago Blues	Testament Records	1965
