= Webb, Mississippi =

- Town
- Location of Webb, Mississippi

- Location in the United States
- Coordinates: 33°56′52″N 90°20′47″W
- Country: United States
- State: Mississippi
- County: Tallahatchie

Area
  - Total: 0.42 sq mi (1.09 km^{2})
  - Land: 0.42 sq mi (1.09 km^{2})
  - Water: 0 sq mi (0.00 km^{2})
- Elevation: 151 ft (46 m)

Population (2020)
  - Total: 416
  - Density: 986.6/sq mi (380.92/km^{2})
- Time zone: UTC-6 (Central (CST))
  - Summer (DST): UTC-5 (CDT)
- ZIP code: 38966
- Area code: 662
- FIPS code: 28-78480
- GNIS feature ID: 2406848
- Website: www.city-data.com/city/Webb-Mississippi.html

Webb is a town in Tallahatchie County, Mississippi. As of the 2020 census, Webb had a population of 416.

== History ==
Webb was founded circa 1880. The first post office was founded in 1880 and named Hood for one of the earlier settlers. In 1882, Judge James L.A. Webb, a Confederate veteran and a University of North Carolina graduate, operated the only store there and later the Hood Masonic Lodge was built. There was one saloon at that time called "The Razzle Dazzle". The town was incorporated in 1905.

In those days most of the groceries and necessities were brought to Hood by flat bottom boat from Sharkey, Mississippi, being hauled down the river from Friars Point. Cassidy Bayou was navigable then and was maintained by the government from Sharkey to Hood. The town was later renamed in honor of Judge Webb.

In July 2001, Earnestine Dixon became the town's first African American mayor and served one term from 2001 to 2005.

== Geography ==
According to the United States Census Bureau, the town has a total area of 0.4 square miles (1.0 km^{2}), all land.

== Demographics ==
Historical population
Census	Pop.	Note	%±
1900	128		—
1910	292		128.1%
1920	553		89.4%
1930	531		−4.0%
1940	606		14.1%
1950	680		12.2%
1960	686		0.9%
1970	751		9.5%
1980	782		4.1%
1990	605		−22.6%
2000	587		−3.0%
2010	565		−3.7%
2020	416		−26.4%
U.S. Decennial Census

=== Racial and ethnic composition ===
Webb town, Mississippi – Racial and ethnic composition Note: the US Census treats Hispanic/Latino as an ethnic category. This table excludes Latinos from the racial categories and assigns them to a separate category. Hispanics/Latinos may be of any race.
Race / Ethnicity (NH = Non-Hispanic)	Pop 2000	Pop 2010	Pop 2020	% 2000	% 2010	% 2020
White alone (NH)	206	57	41	35.09%	10.09%	9.86%
Black or African American alone (NH)	360	474	367	61.33%	83.89%	88.22%
Native American or Alaska Native alone (NH)	0	5	0	0.00%	0.88%	0.00%
Asian alone (NH)	12	2	0	2.04%	0.35%	0.00%
Native Hawaiian or Pacific Islander alone (NH)	0	0	0	0.00%	0.00%	0.00%
Other race alone (NH)	0	0	0	0.00%	0.00%	0.00%
Mixed race or Multiracial (NH)	4	8	6	0.68%	1.42%	1.44%
Hispanic or Latino (any race)	5	19	2	0.85%	3.36%	0.48%
Total	587	565	416	100.00%	100.00%	100.00%

=== 2000 census ===
As of the census of 2000, there were 587 people, 225 households, and 135 families residing in the town. The population density was 1,380.0 inhabitants per square mile (532.8/km^{2}). There were 251 housing units at an average density of 590.1 per square mile (227.8/km^{2}). The racial makeup of the town was 35.09% White, 61.33% African American, 2.04% Asian, and 1.53% from two or more races. Hispanic or Latino of any race were 0.85% of the population.

There were 225 households, out of which 26.2% had children under the age of 18 living with them, 33.3% were married couples living together, 20.9% had a female householder with no husband present, and 40.0% were non-families. 35.6% of all households were made up of individuals, and 14.7% had someone living alone who was 65 years of age or older. The average household size was 2.61 and the average family size was 3.47.

In the town, the population was spread out, with 26.1% under the age of 18, 12.9% from 18 to 24, 26.4% from 25 to 44, 18.6% from 45 to 64, and 16.0% who were 65 years of age or older. The median age was 35 years. For every 100 females, there were 95.7 males. For every 100 females age 18 and over, there were 96.4 males.

The median income for a household in the town was $25,000, and the median income for a family was $29,063. Males had a median income of $26,500 versus $23,125 for females. The per capita income for the town was $12,272. About 16.2% of families and 26.6% of the population were below the poverty line, including 39.4% of those under age 18 and 26.1% of those age 65 or over.

== Education ==
The Town of Webb is served by the West Tallahatchie School District. R. H. Bearden Elementary School and West Tallahatchie High School are the area schools.

Prior to 1988 Sumner Elementary School was elementary school for the Webb and Sumner areas and West District Middle School was the area middle school. In 1988 West District Middle became a grade 3-8 school while Sumner Elementary was redesignated for Kindergarten through grade 2 only.

As of 2002 some children in Webb attended the North Sunflower Academy in unincorporated Sunflower County, and Strider Academy (which ceased operation in 2018) in Charleston.

== Notable people ==
- Mamie Till Mobley — mother of Emmett Till; born in Webb and moved to Argo, Illinois in 1924.
