= Upper Sardis Wildlife Management Area =

Protected area in Mississippi, United States

- Upper Sardis WMA
- IUCN category IV (habitat/species management area)
- Location within Mississippi Location within the United States
- Location: Lafayette County and Marshall county, Mississippi, United States
- Nearest city: Oxford, Mississippi
- Coordinates: 34°24′53″N 89°19′32″W
- Area: 50,725 acres (205.3 km^{2})
- Governing body: Mississippi Department of Wildlife, Fisheries and Parks

Upper Sardis Wildlife Management Area (WMA) is a 13.61 square mile (50,725 acres (20,528 ha)) irregular tract of protected land located in Lafayette County, within Holly Springs National Forest. Part of the northern boundary of the WMA, south of the Little Tallahatchie Canal, to include north of the Little Tallahatchie River, is located in Marshall County. All U. S. Army Corps of Engineer lands in Lafayette and Marshall Counties and all National forest land in Lafayette County is under the Upper Sardis WMA.
