= Owl Creek Mounds =

Archaeological site in Mississippi, USA

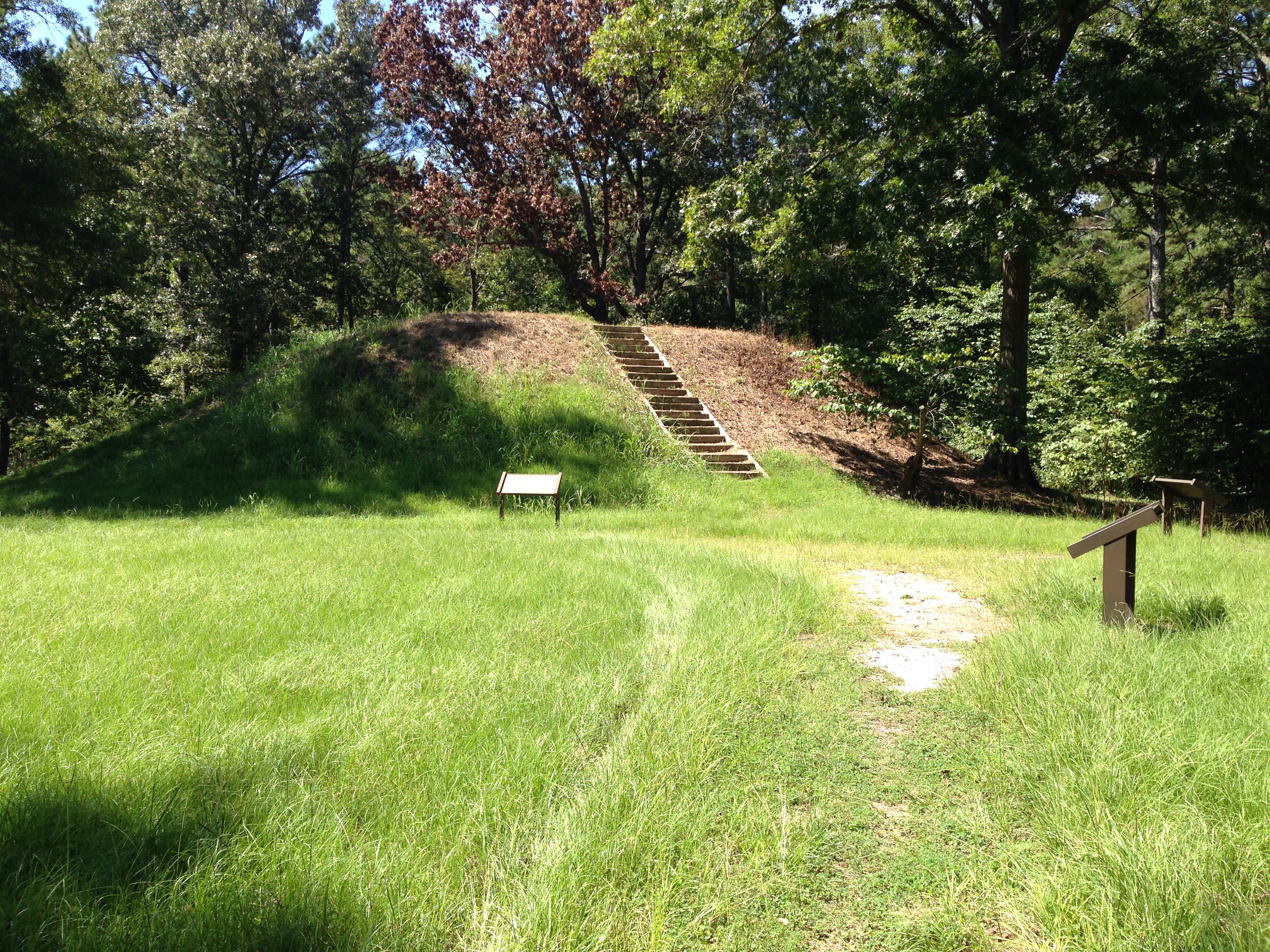

- Location within Mississippi
- 34°03′24″N 88°55′16″W
- Cultures: Mississippian culture
- Location: Tombigbee National Forest, United States
- Region: Tombigbee National Forest

The Owl Creek Mounds are a Native American Ceremonial Complex located in Mississippi's Tombigbee National Forest. The mounds are believed to have been built between 800 and 900 years ago during the Mississippian era. Archaeological excavations from 1991 to 1992 by crews from Mississippi State University led by Janet Rafferty revealed structural remains on three of the mounds at the site.
