= Sumner, Mississippi =

- Town
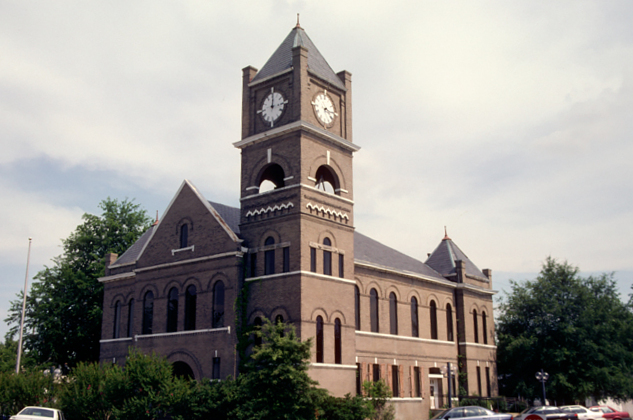
- Tallahatchie County Courthouse in Sumner

- Location of Sumner, Mississippi

- Location in the United States
- Coordinates: 33°58′07″N 90°22′23″W
- Country: United States
- State: Mississippi
- County: Tallahatchie

Area
  - Total: 0.55 sq mi (1.42 km^{2})
  - Land: 0.55 sq mi (1.42 km^{2})
  - Water: 0 sq mi (0.00 km^{2})
- Elevation: 151 ft (46 m)

Population (2020)
  - Total: 278
  - Density: 505.5/sq mi (195.18/km^{2})
- Time zone: UTC-6 (Central (CST))
  - Summer (DST): UTC-5 (CDT)
- ZIP code: 38957
- Area code: 662
- FIPS code: 28-71520
- GNIS feature ID: 2406688

Sumner is a town in Tallahatchie County, Mississippi. As of the 2020 census, Sumner had a population of 278. Sumner is one of the two county seats of Tallahatchie County. It is located on the west side of the county and the Tallahatchie River, which runs through the county north–south. The other county seat is Charleston, located east of the river. Charleston was the first county seat, as settlement came from the east, and it is the larger of the two towns.

The courthouse has been restored. It also houses the Emmett Till Interpretive Center, which opened in 2012 in his honor. They were designated part of Emmett Till and Mamie Till-Mobley National Monument in 2023.

== Geography ==
Sumner is located at 33°58′12″N 90°22′11″W (33.969867, -90.369636).

According to the United States Census Bureau, the town has a total area of 0.6 square miles (1.6 km^{2}), all land.

== History ==
The heavily wooded swamp along the Tallahatchie River was historically part of the Choctaw Nation, one of the Five Civilized Tribes of the Southeast. Ceding large amounts of territory to the United States, they were forced to remove to Indian Territory in the 1830s under the Indian Removal Act.

Afterward the US government sold the lands to European-American families. Among the early settlers were the Sumner family. The bottomland was covered by trees, vines, and underbrush when the pioneers started clearing the land for agriculture. The wealthiest men developed their property through the labor of enslaved African Americans. Their work on cotton plantations produced the commodity crop that was the basis of the economy for decades.

Sumner was not incorporated until 1900; it was named after its founder and first mayor, Joseph Burton Sumner. In 1902 the county was divided into two districts, on either side of the Tallahatchie River, which was a barrier to cross-county transportation. Charleston was the original county seat, located east of the river in the first area of European-American settlement. Sumner was designated as the seat of the western district.

The Tallahatchie County Courthouse in Sumner was built in 1902 on a lot donated by Joseph B. Sumner, who also donated the lot for the jail. The courthouse burned in 1908 and was rebuilt in 1909. Cotton continued to be the major commodity crop of the area well into the 20th century. The county seat also served as the market town for that district.

This courthouse was the site of the September 1955 murder trial of two white men, J.W. Milam and Roy Bryant, charged in the lynching and murder of Emmett Till that year in adjoining Leflore County. (His beaten and mutilated body was found on the bank of the river in Tallahatchie County, so the trial was held here.) The two men were acquitted by an all-male, all-white jury of the murder of Till, a teenage African-American boy from Chicago. The brutality of his murder and the acquittal of the men generated outrage and activism in the nation. He became an icon of the Civil Rights Movement and a symbol of the violent persecution suffered by blacks in the South.

In 1990, the courthouse was designated as a state landmark by the Mississippi Department of Archives and History. In 2007 the Tallahatchie Board of Supervisors appointed the Emmett Till Memorial Commission to explore commemoration of Till and reconciliation in the area. It made a formal apology to the Till family for their son's lynching. In addition, it undertook to restore the Sumner County Courthouse and adapt it as the site of an interpretive center to commemorate Emmett Till. The center opened in 2012 and is sponsoring a variety of art and historical workshops and events.

== Demographics ==
The city reached its peak of population in 1940. After that numerous African-American residents left the city and county. Many moved to California and the West Coast during World War II and after, attracted by jobs in the buildup of the defense industries and seeking to escape southern oppression and violence. In addition, mechanization of agriculture had made much farm labor unneeded. African Americans moving from Sumner were part of the Great Migration, by which some 5 million blacks moved out of the Deep South from 1940 to 1970. Rural populations have continued to decline in many areas.

Historical population
Census	Pop.	Note	%±
1910	364		—
1920	613		68.4%
1930	618		0.8%
1940	662		7.1%
1950	550		−16.9%
1960	551		0.2%
1970	533		−3.3%
1980	452		−15.2%
1990	368		−18.6%
2000	407		10.6%
2010	316		−22.4%
2020	278		−12.0%
U.S. Decennial Census

As of the census of 2000, there were 407 people, 148 households, and 105 families residing in the town. The population density was 726.5 inhabitants per square mile (280.5/km^{2}). There were 158 housing units at an average density of 282.0 per square mile (108.9/km^{2}). The racial makeup of the town was 57.99% White, 39.07% African American, 2.21% Asian, and 0.74% from two or more races. Hispanic or Latino of any race were 0.25% of the population.

There were 148 households, out of which 31.8% had children under the age of 18 living with them, 47.3% were married couples living together, 20.3% had a female householder with no husband present, and 28.4% were non-families. 23.0% of all households were made up of individuals, and 12.8% had someone living alone who was 65 years of age or older. The average household size was 2.67 and the average family size was 3.14.

In the town, the population was spread out, with 27.5% under the age of 18, 6.1% from 18 to 24, 24.8% from 25 to 44, 24.6% from 45 to 64, and 17.0% who were 65 years of age or older. The median age was 40 years. For every 100 females, there were 86.7 males. For every 100 females age 18 and over, there were 86.7 males.

The median income for a household in the town was $25,000, and the median income for a family was $35,208. Males had a median income of $40,625 versus $15,000 for females. The per capita income for the town was $20,056. About 25.2% of families and 37.2% of the population were below the poverty line, including 48.9% of those under age 18 and 29.7% of those age 65 or over.

== Notable people ==
- L. Desaix Anderson, career United States Foreign Service officer specializing in East Asian affairs, and served as American Chargé d'Affaires ad interim to Vietnam from 1995 to 1997
- Patti Carr Black, author
- William Eggleston, world-renowned color photographer; grew up on a plantation in Sumner
- Robert Huddleston, member of the Mississippi House of Representatives from 1996 to 2018
- Red Nelson, noted blues singer; born in Sumner in 1907

== Education ==
The Town of Sumner is served by the West Tallahatchie School District. R. H. Bearden Elementary School and West Tallahatchie High School are the zoned schools.

Prior to 1988 Sumner Elementary School was elementary school for the Sumner and Webb areas and West District Middle School was the area middle school. In 1988 West District Middle became a grade 3-8 school while Sumner Elementary was redesignated for Kindergarten through grade 2 only.

Coahoma Community College is the designated community college.
