= George P. Cossar State Park =

State park in Mississippi, United States

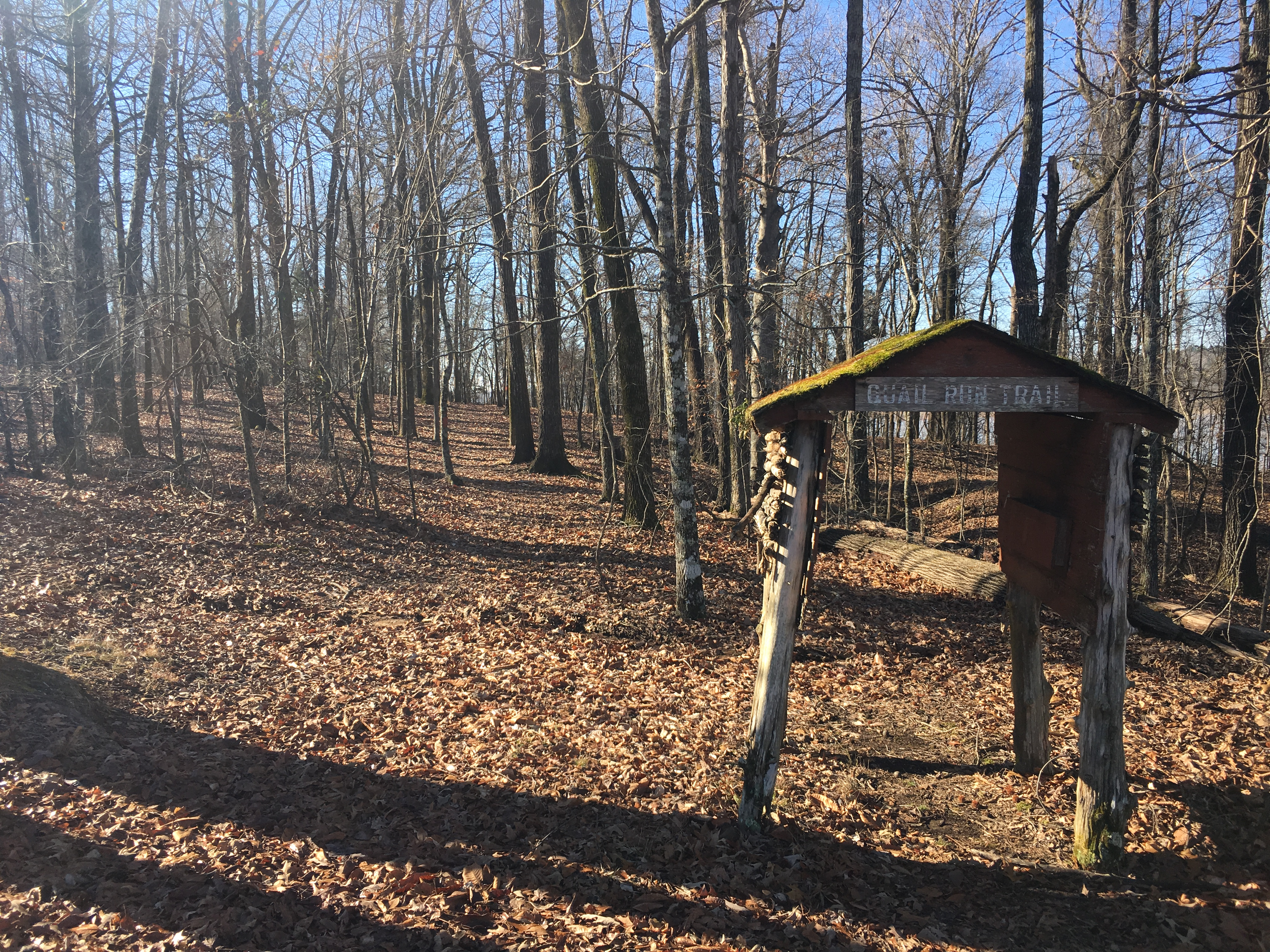
- Nature trail trailhead

- Location within Mississippi
- Location: Yalobusha County, Mississippi, United States
- Coordinates: 34°07′55″N 89°53′00″W
- Elevation: 276 ft (84 m)
- Administrator: Mississippi Department of Wildlife, Fisheries, and Parks
- Designation: Mississippi state park
- Named for: Politician George P. Cossar
- Website: Official website

George P. Cossar State Park is a public recreation area in the U.S. state of Mississippi located on the shores of Enid Lake, five miles (8.0 km) northeast of Oakland off Mississippi Highway 32.

== History ==
The state park opened in 1966 as Yocona Ridge State Park. It was renamed in honor of longtime Mississippi state legislator George Payne Cossar, Sr., in 1979. The world record crappie was caught in Enid Lake in 1954.

== Activities and amenities ==
The park features boating, waterskiing and fishing on 6,100-acre (2,500 ha) Enid Lake, 76 campsites, camper cabins, visitors center, disc golf course, miniature golf course, picnic area, and nature trail. Most of the land around the lake and in nearby Holly Springs National Forest is open for hunting.

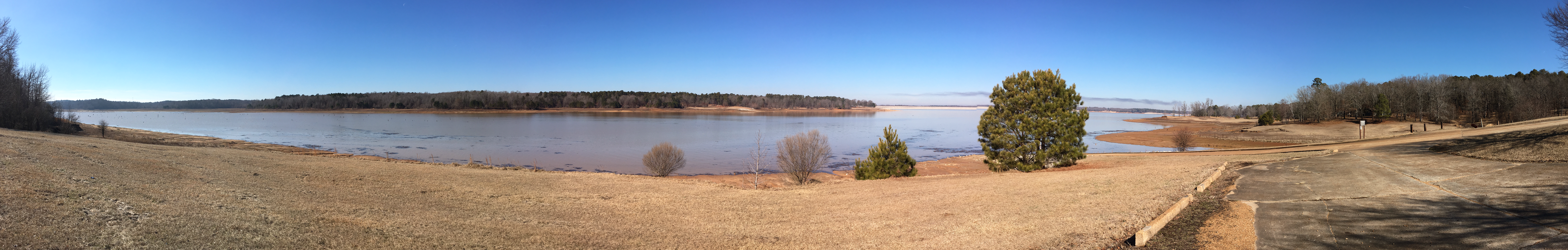
Enid Lake at George P. Cossar State Park
