= Tombigbee National Forest =

National Forest in Mississippi, US

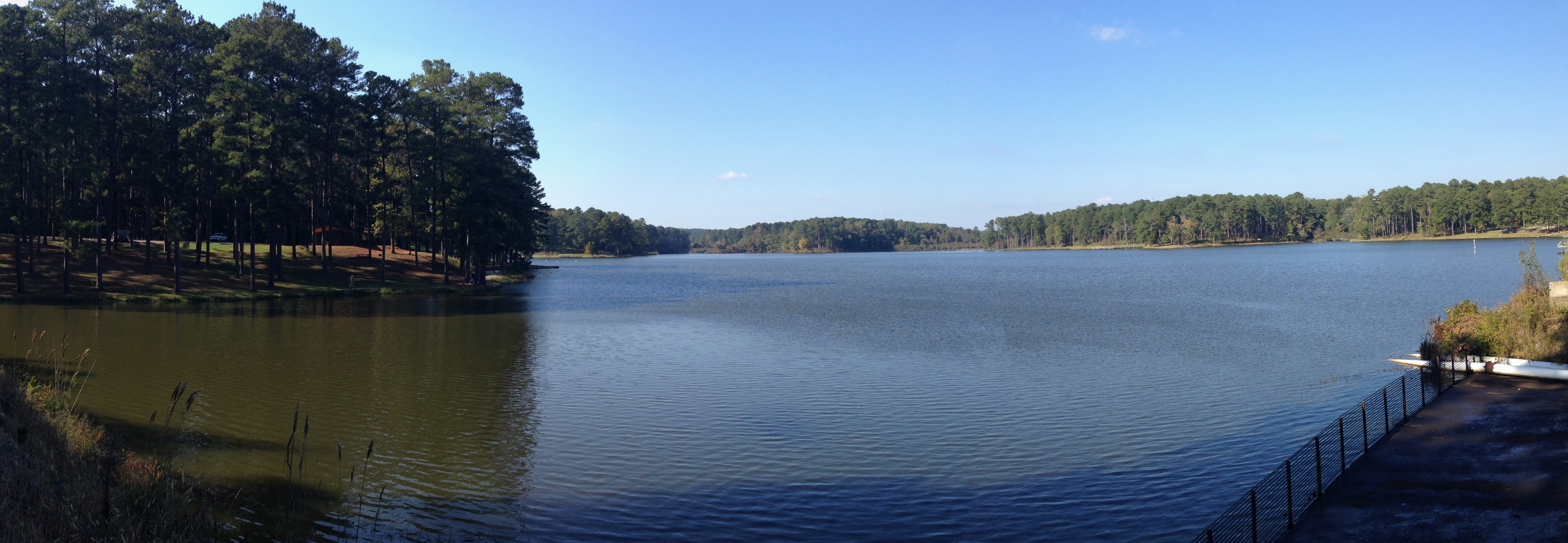
- Choctaw Lake

- Location within the United States
- Location: Mississippi, United States
- Nearest city: Tupelo, MS
- Coordinates: 33°59′32″N 88°55′03″W
- Area: 67,005 acres (271.16 km^{2})
- Established: November 27, 1959
- Governing body: U.S. Forest Service
- Website: National Forests in Mississippi

Tombigbee National Forest is a U.S. National Forest in eastern and northeastern Mississippi. It is named for the nearby Tombigbee River. It is divided geographically into two non-contiguous sections. The larger southern section, about 60% of the total acreage, is located north of Louisville, in parts of Winston, Choctaw, and Oktibbeha counties in eastern Mississippi. The smaller northern section, about 40% of the total acreage, is located northeast of Houston, in parts of Chickasaw and Pontotoc counties in northeastern Mississippi. As a whole the forest lies, in descending order of land area, in Winston, Chickasaw, Choctaw, Pontotoc, and Oktibbeha counties. The forest has a total area of 67,005 acres (105 sq mi, or 271 km^{2}). Headquarters of forest administration is in Jackson, as are those for all six National Forests in Mississippi, but local ranger district offices are located in Ackerman. The forest contains the Owl Creek Mounds, which include five platform mounds built between 1100 and 1200 CE.

== See also ==
- List of national forests of the United States
