= Enid Lake =

Lake in Mississippi, United States

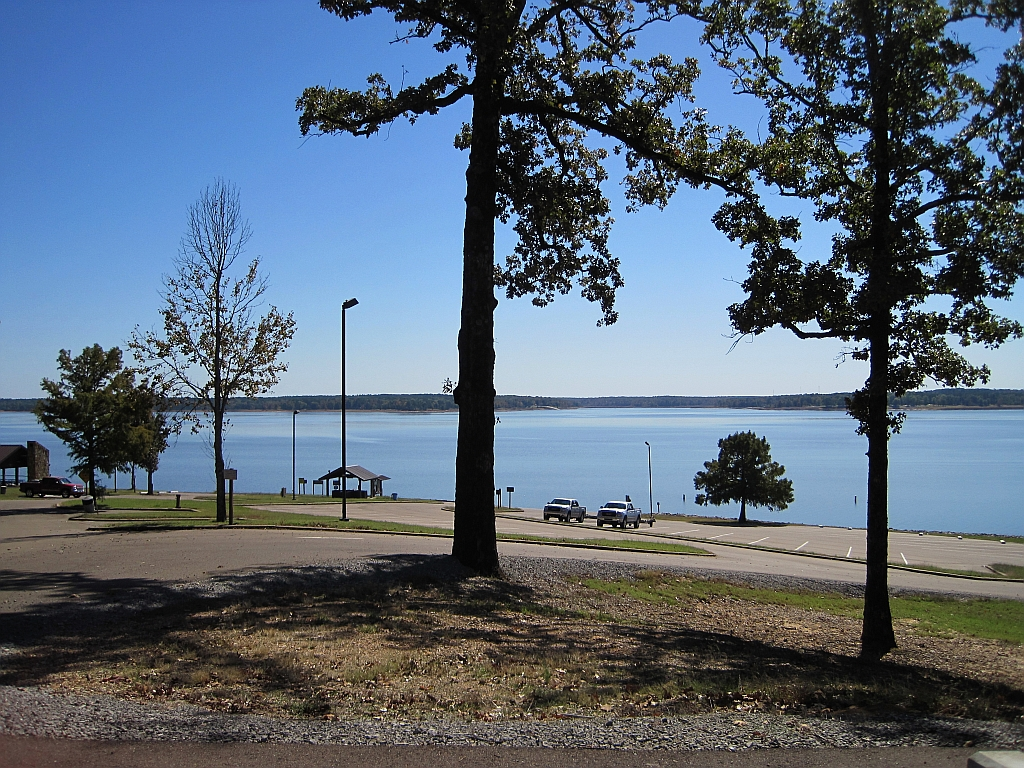
- Enid Lake, 2012

- Location within Mississippi Location within the United States
- Location: Yalobusha / Panola / Lafayette counties, Mississippi, US
- Coordinates: 34°08′56″N 089°54′22″W
- Basin countries: United States
- Surface elevation: 266 ft (81 m)
- Settlements: Enid

Enid Lake is a lake that is located mostly in Yalobusha County in the U.S. state of Mississippi. Parts of it extend into Panola and Lafayette counties. Common fish species include crappie, largemouth bass, catfish and bream. Enid Lake holds the world record for white crappie at 5 lbs 3 oz (2.35 kg), and holds the Mississippi state record for shortnose gar at 5.83 lb (2.64 kg), as well as the state record for spotted gar at 8.1 lb (3.7 kg). (Note: Both state records were caught in the Enid spillway, part of the Enid Dam, technically a different body of water than the lake, itself.)

Enid Dam is an earthen dam across the Yocona River. The dam is 110 ft (34 m) high and 8,400 ft (2,600 m) long at its crest. The structure was completed in 1952, for flood control and recreation, as a project of the United States Army Corps of Engineers. The lake (conservation pool) has a surface area of 6,100 acres (2,500 ha) and a storage of 57,600 acre-foot (71,000,000 m^{3}).

== See also ==
- George P. Cossar State Park
- Tailrace fishing
