= Enid, Mississippi =

- Unincorporated community
- Location within Mississippi Location within the United States
- Coordinates: 34°06′59″N 89°56′23″W
- Country: United States
- State: Mississippi
- County: Tallahatchie
- Elevation: 315 ft (96 m)
- Time zone: UTC-6 (Central (CST))
  - Summer (DST): UTC-5 (CDT)
- ZIP code: 38927
- Area code: 662
- GNIS feature ID: 693174

Enid is an unincorporated community located in Tallahatchie County, Mississippi, United States. Enid is located near U.S. Highway 51 approximately 7 miles (11 km) north of Oakland, Mississippi and approximately 9 miles (14 km) south of Pope, Mississippi.

Although Enid is an unincorporated community, it has a post office and a zip code of 38927.

== History ==
Enid was originally known as Harrison and was named for a family who settled in the area. Around 1900, the name was changed to Enid.

In 1871, a bill was unsuccessfully introduced to the Mississippi Senate which proposed the creation of a new county from a portion of Tallahatchie County and Panola County, with a new county seat at Harrison.

In 1900, Enid was home to a cotton gin, express office, multiple churches, and a school.

Enid is located on the Grenada Railroad.

In 2025, the Mitchell & McClendon General Merchants Building in Enid was added to the National Register of Historic Places. The building is now occupied by The Enid Depot, a restaurant that has been honored by Business Insider, the Mississippi Cattleman's Association, and Mississippi Beef Council.

== Notable people ==
- Ed Hamilton, former college football player and former Vanderbilt University basketball and baseball coach
- John Mitchell, flying ace and United States Air Force officer
- Duncan L. Thompson, State Auditor of Mississippi from 1912 to 1916
