= Swan Lake, Mississippi =

- Unincorporated community
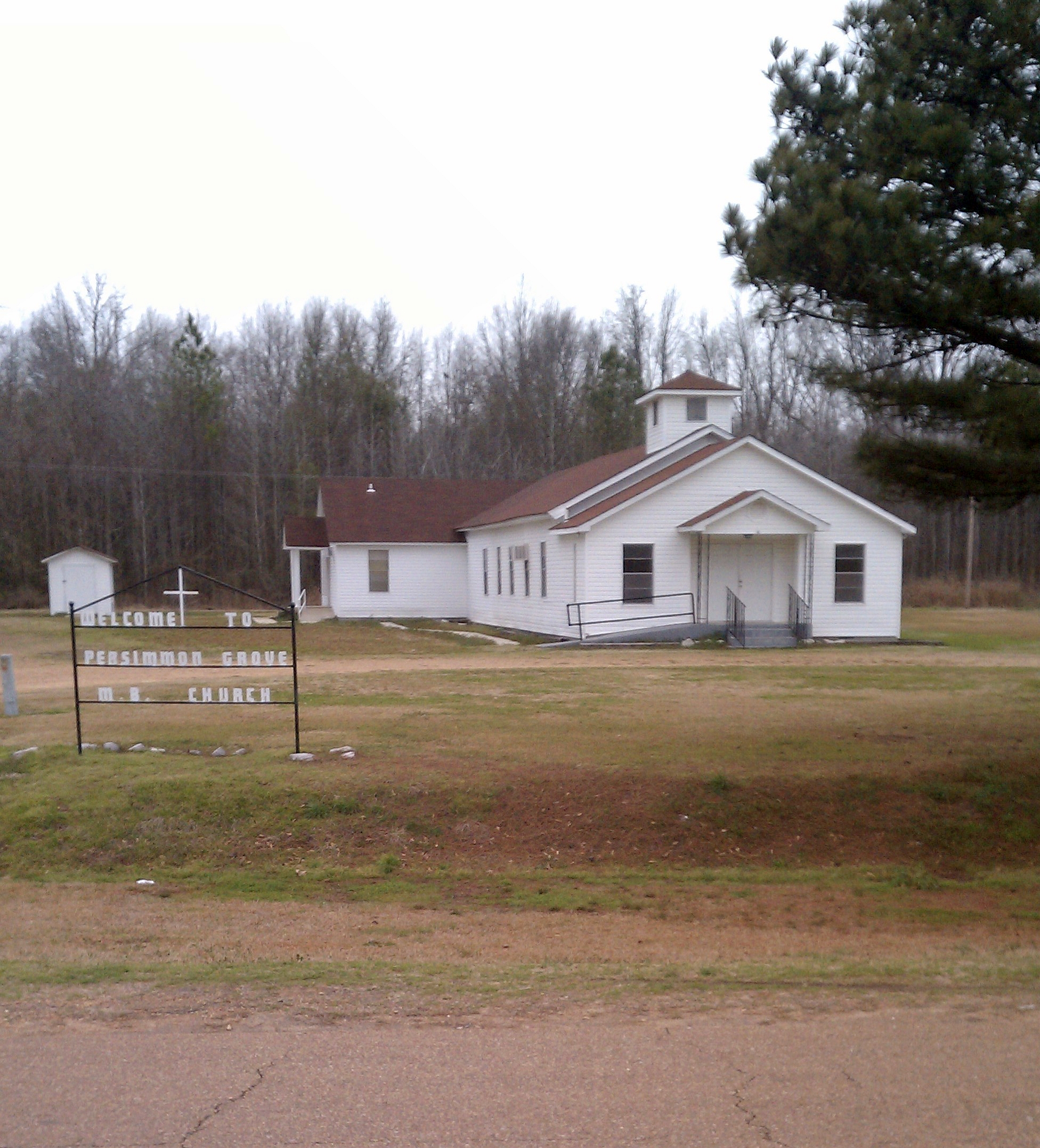
- Persimmon Grove M.B. Church located in Swan Lake

- Location within Mississippi Location within the United States
- Coordinates: 33°52′34″N 90°17′03″W
- Country: United States
- State: Mississippi
- County: Tallahatchie
- Elevation: 148 ft (45 m)
- Time zone: UTC-6 (Central (CST))
  - Summer (DST): UTC-5 (CDT)
- ZIP code: 38958
- Area code: 662
- GNIS feature ID: 678451

Swan Lake is an unincorporated community located in Tallahatchie County, Mississippi. Swan Lake is approximately 4 miles (6.4 km) north of Glendora and 7 miles (11 km) south of Webb along Swan Lake Road. Swan Lake has a post office with ZIP code 38958.

== History ==
It is unclear when Swan Lake became an official community, but it was thought to be in the early- to mid-20th century. It was started by a wealthy farmer named Bob Flautt. His labor and cotton gin were located in the most central part of his plantation. Swan Lake is actually the name of a lake about a mile north of the gin lot. Eventually the name was given to the plantation. Catfish ponds were eventually built that would parallel the gin lot. A small crop dusting airport would be installed as well as a store and post office.

Swan Lake is a terminus of the Mississippi Delta Railroad.

In 1900, Swan Lake had a population of 52.

== Gallery ==
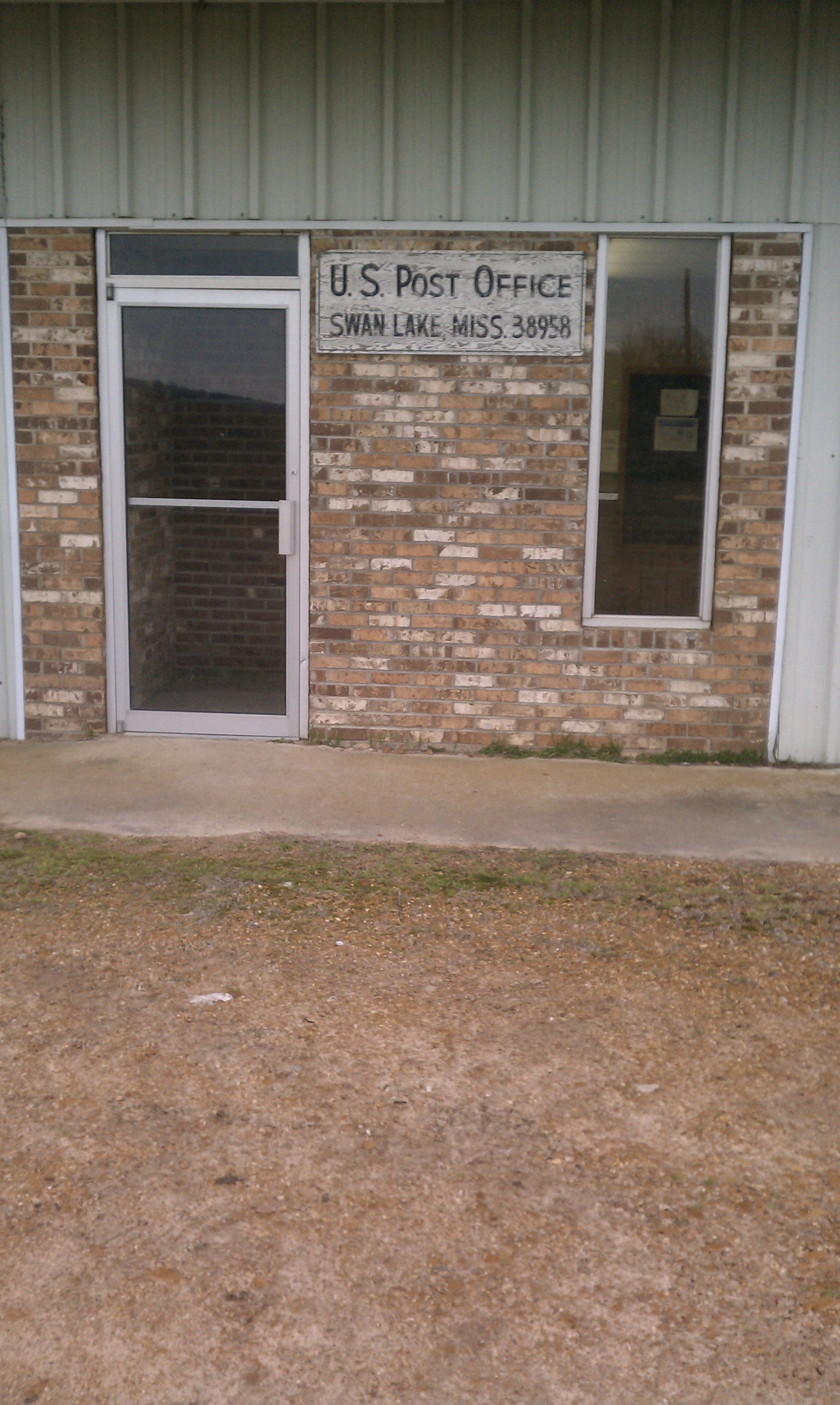
Swan Lake Post Office

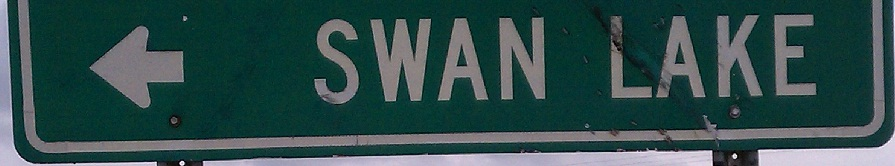
Sign for Swan Lake
