= Tallahatchie County, Mississippi =

County in Mississippi, United States

- County
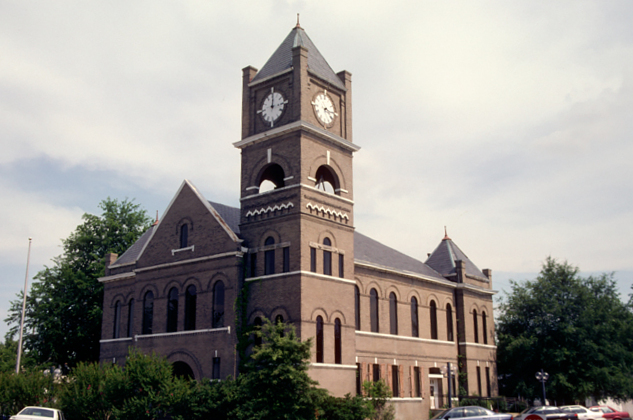
- Tallahatchie County Courthouse in Sumner

- Location within the U.S. state of Mississippi
- Coordinates: 33°57′N 90°10′W
- Country: United States
- State: Mississippi
- Founded: December 31, 1833
- Named for: Choctaw word roughly meaning “River of rocks"
- Seat: Charleston and Sumner
- Largest city: Charleston

Area
  - Total: 652 sq mi (1,690 km^{2})
  - Land: 645 sq mi (1,670 km^{2})
  - Water: 6.9 sq mi (18 km^{2}) 1.1%

Population (2020)
  - Total: 12,715
  - Estimate (2025): 10,877 ▼
  - Density: 19.7/sq mi (7.61/km^{2})
- Time zone: UTC−6 (Central)
  - Summer (DST): UTC−5 (CDT)
- Congressional district: 2nd

Tallahatchie County is a county in the U.S. state of Mississippi. At the 2020 census, the population was 12,715. Its county seats are Charleston and Sumner.

Tallahatchie County is located within the Mississippi Delta. The county is divided by the Tallahatchie River which runs from north to south through the county before joining what becomes the Yazoo River in LeFlore County.

== History ==
The county was founded on December 31, 1833, after most of the Choctaw Nation was forced out under Indian Removal. Tallahatchie is a Choctaw name meaning "rock river". The county is one of 10 in Mississippi with two county seats: Charleston on the east side of the river and Sumner on the west side. Charleston was the first county seat. Sumner was organized later in 1872 in the district to the west and has always been smaller in population.

Charleston was founded by European Americans in 1837, but its history antedates that. Settlers who were there illegally had developed five communities along the forks of Tillatoba Creek.

In 1833 the federal government opened the land for settlement by European Americans after the Choctaw were relocated to Indian Territory west of the Mississippi River, in what is now Oklahoma. Ancient Indian trails led through the county at the time. Most of the settlers entered the county over what was called Charley's Trace, an Indian trail that came across east from the Mississippi River and entered the hills about where Leverett is now located. Here the trail merged with a trail from the south and passed near the present site of Charleston.

Colonel Thomas Bailey came from Kentucky and formed the first European-American settlement on the north fork of the creek, which was about five miles to the northeast. He was later joined by James Bailey, Samuel Caruthers, William Flemming, M. Johnson, Willam Kendrick, Robert Thrasher, A. Patterson, and Kinchen Mayo, who extended the settlement along the creek toward the Junction. Another settlement was started by the Priddys, the J. Houstons, Cade Alford, and the Carson family, who extended the settlement along the creek to the junction of three forks.

DeKalb and Tillatoba were founded on the north fork of the creek just west of the present town. Both towns wanted to be county seat of Tallahatchie, and Tillatoba gained the distinction. In 1837 the Board of Police found it necessary to abandon Tillatoba.

A section of unsettled land lay at the heart of the first five settlements. Under the Dancing Rabbit Treaty of 1830, this section of land had been granted to Greenwood LeFlore, the leading Choctaw chief. He stayed in Mississippi on his land after most of his people moved to Indian Territory.

J.S. Topp & Co. had acquired this section of land and proposed to build the town of Charleston (named for Charleston, South Carolina). He hoped to have this designated as the permanent county seat. In 1843 the county seat fight flared up again. The board voted to abandon Charleston, but Mr. Steel, president of the Board of Police, refused to sign the minutes which killed the rally.

J.B. Sumner moved to this section in 1872 and founded what is now Sumner. The present site was a dense forest. He donated land for the railroad right-of-way, railroad park, and courthouse square and jail lot. The next year Presbyterians erected Maria Church. From 1882 through 1884 disastrous floods and overflows of the Tallahatchie River forced the people of Sumner to go by boat for supplies to Webb (which was at the time called Hood). A post office was established in 1885, and the town incorporated in 1900.

The first county court house in Sumner was built in 1902; it was destroyed by fire in 1908. The records were saved, but in 1909 the entire business section of the town burned, and all records were destroyed. From 1931 through 1933, floods inundated thousands of acres of farmland and destroyed much property.

Sumner's county courthouse was the site of the 1955 murder trial of two white men, J.W. Milam and Roy Bryant, accused in the lynching and murder of Emmett Till that year in adjoining Leflore County. They were acquitted by an all-white jury of the murder of Till, a teenage African-American boy from Chicago. In 1990, the courthouse was designated as a state landmark by the Mississippi Department of Archives and History.

That same year, in nearby Glendora, Mississippi, resident Elmer Kimbrell shot and killed African-American Clinton Melton in front of three witnesses after an argument about how much gas Melton pumped into Kimbrell's car. He was acquitted after a short trial. Shortly before this murder, Kimbrell was involved in the Emmett Till murder.

== Geography ==
According to the U.S. Census Bureau, the county has a total area of 652 square miles (1,690 km^{2}), of which 645 square miles (1,670 km^{2}) is land and 6.9 square miles (18 km^{2}) (1.1%) is water. The county is intersected by the Tallahatchie River.

=== Major highways ===
- U.S. Highway 49
- Mississippi Highway 3
- Mississippi Highway 8
- Mississippi Highway 32
- Mississippi Highway 35

=== Adjacent counties ===
- Quitman County (north)
- Panola County (northeast)
- Yalobusha County (east)
- Grenada County (southeast)
- Leflore County (south)
- Sunflower County (southwest)
- Coahoma County (northwest)

=== National protected areas ===
- Coldwater River National Wildlife Refuge (part)
- Tallahatchie National Wildlife Refuge (part)

== Demographics ==
Historical population
Census	Pop.	Note	%±
1840	2,985		—
1850	4,643		55.5%
1860	7,890		69.9%
1870	7,852		−0.5%
1880	10,926		39.1%
1890	14,361		31.4%
1900	19,600		36.5%
1910	29,078		48.4%
1920	35,953		23.6%
1930	35,568		−1.1%
1940	34,166		−3.9%
1950	30,486		−10.8%
1960	24,081		−21.0%
1970	19,338		−19.7%
1980	17,157		−11.3%
1990	15,210		−11.3%
2000	14,903		−2.0%
2010	15,378		3.2%
2020	12,715		−17.3%
2025 (est.)	10,877	▼	−14.5%
U.S. Decennial Census; 1790-1960 1900-1990; 1990-2000 2010-2013

=== Racial and ethnic composition ===
Tallahatchie County, Mississippi – Racial and ethnic composition Note: the US Census treats Hispanic/Latino as an ethnic category. This table excludes Latinos from the racial categories and assigns them to a separate category. Hispanics/Latinos may be of any race.
Race / Ethnicity (NH = Non-Hispanic)	Pop 1980	Pop 1990	Pop 2000	Pop 2010	Pop 2020	% 1980	% 1990	% 2000	% 2010	% 2020
White alone (NH)	7,199	6,235	5,867	5,580	4,727	41.96%	40.99%	39.37%	36.29%	37.18%
Black or African American alone (NH)	9,627	8,836	8,784	8,634	7,390	56.11%	58.09%	58.94%	56.15%	58.12%
Native American or Alaska Native alone (NH)	3	14	13	32	4	0.02%	0.09%	0.09%	0.21%	0.03%
Asian alone (NH)	61	43	52	116	10	0.36%	0.28%	0.35%	0.75%	0.08%
Native Hawaiian or Pacific Islander alone (NH)	x	x	0	11	3	x	x	0.00%	0.07%	0.02%
Other race alone (NH)	10	0	0	18	0	0.06%	0.00%	0.00%	0.12%	0.00%
Mixed race or Multiracial (NH)	x	x	50	121	156	x	x	0.34%	0.79%	1.23%
Hispanic or Latino (any race)	257	82	137	866	425	1.50%	0.54%	0.92%	5.63%	3.34%
Total	17,157	15,210	14,903	15,378	12,715	100.00%	100.00%	100.00%	100.00%	100.00%

=== 2020 census ===
As of the 2020 census, the county had a population of 12,715. The median age was 39.8 years. 20.1% of residents were under the age of 18 and 17.6% of residents were 65 years of age or older. For every 100 females there were 112.7 males, and for every 100 females age 18 and over there were 117.5 males age 18 and over.

The racial makeup of the county was 39.6% White, 58.6% Black or African American, 0.1% American Indian and Alaska Native, 0.1% Asian, <0.1% Native Hawaiian and Pacific Islander, 0.1% from some other race, and 1.5% from two or more races. Hispanic or Latino residents of any race comprised 3.3% of the population.

<0.1% of residents lived in urban areas, while 100.0% lived in rural areas.

There were 4,587 households in the county, of which 28.2% had children under the age of 18 living in them. Of all households, 33.4% were married-couple households, 21.7% were households with a male householder and no spouse or partner present, and 39.4% were households with a female householder and no spouse or partner present. About 32.3% of all households were made up of individuals and 13.8% had someone living alone who was 65 years of age or older.

There were 5,450 housing units, of which 15.8% were vacant. Among occupied housing units, 72.3% were owner-occupied and 27.7% were renter-occupied. The homeowner vacancy rate was 0.8% and the rental vacancy rate was 24.8%.

=== 2010 census ===
As of the 2010 United States census, there were 15,378 people living in the county. 56.4% were Black or African American, 38.9% White, 0.8% Asian, 0.3% Native American, 0.1% Pacific Islander, 2.4% of some other race and 1.2% of two or more races. 5.6% were Hispanic or Latino (of any race).

=== 2000 census ===
As of the census of 2000, there were 14,903 people, 5,263 households, and 3,826 families living in the county. The population density was 23 people per square mile (8.9 people/km^{2}). There were 5,711 housing units at an average density of 9 units per square mile (3.5 units/km^{2}). The racial makeup of the county was 59.43% Black or African American, 39.62% White, 0.09% Native American, 0.36% Asian, 0.05% from other races, and 0.46% from two or more races. 0.92% of the population were Hispanic or Latino of any race.

There were 5,263 households, out of which 34.00% had children under the age of 18 living with them, 43.50% were married couples living together, 23.50% had a female householder with no husband present, and 27.30% were non-families. 24.60% of all households were made up of individuals, and 11.60% had someone living alone who was 65 years of age or older. The average household size was 2.81 and the average family size was 3.36.

In the county, the population was spread out, with 30.00% under the age of 18, 10.00% from 18 to 24, 25.90% from 25 to 44, 20.90% from 45 to 64, and 13.20% who were 65 years of age or older. The median age was 33 years. For every 100 females there were 87.80 males. For every 100 females age 18 and over, there were 84.40 males.

The median income for a household in the county was $22,229, and the median income for a family was $26,509. Males had a median income of $24,766 versus $18,972 for females. The per capita income for the county was $10,749. About 26.80% of families and 32.20% of the population were below the poverty line, including 43.80% of those under age 18 and 27.80% of those age 65 or over.

Tallahatchie County has the fourth lowest per capita income in Mississippi and the 46th lowest in the United States.

== Government and infrastructure ==
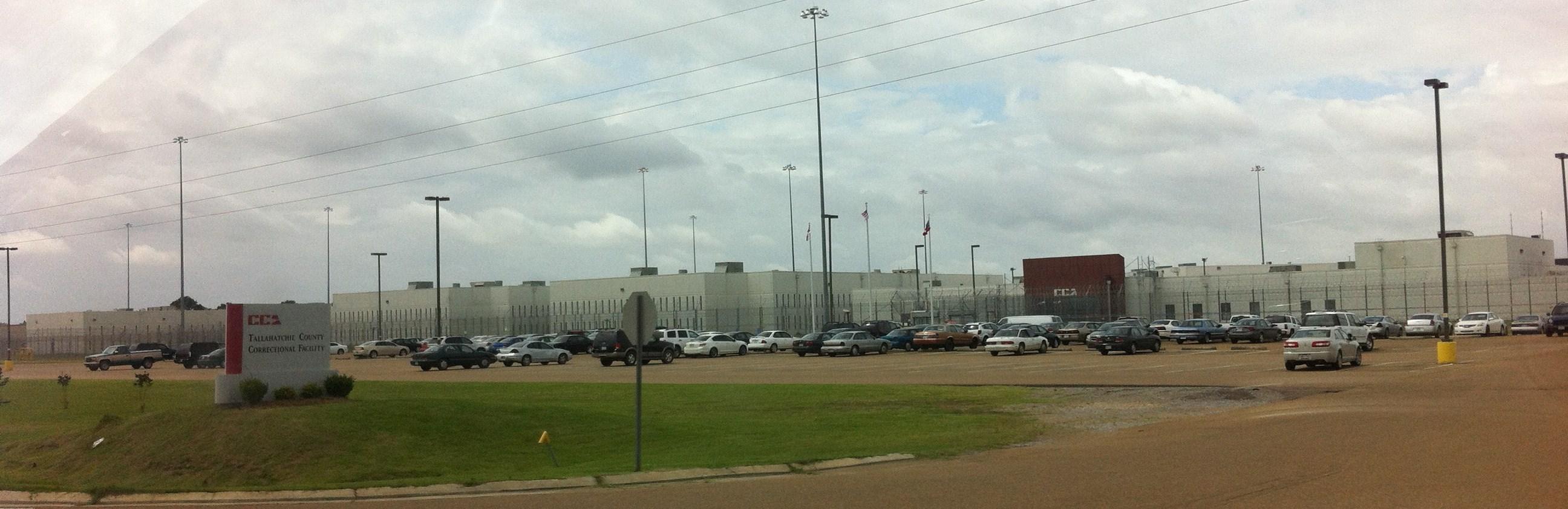
Tallahatchie County Correctional Facility

Tallahatchie County Correctional Facility, a private prison operated by the Corrections Corporation of America on behalf of the Mississippi Department of Corrections, is located in an unincorporated area in the county, near Tutwiler. As of 2010 the prison serves as the Tallahatchie County's jail facility, in addition to housing prison inmates sentenced in California.

Tallahatchie County is a Democratic stronghold, yet less so than many Mississippi Delta counties. It last supported a Republican in the 1988 presidential election. In 2024, Donald Trump performed better than any Republican candidate since then, despite losing by 7 points.

United States presidential election results for Tallahatchie County, Mississippi
Year	Republican		Democratic		Third party(ies)	
Year	No.	%	No.	%	No.	%
1912	16	2.14%	695	93.04%	36	4.82%
1916	6	0.56%	1,061	99.44%	0	0.00%
1920	69	5.88%	1,092	93.02%	13	1.11%
1924	15	1.07%	1,386	98.93%	0	0.00%
1928	33	1.42%	2,284	98.58%	0	0.00%
1932	16	0.65%	2,453	99.27%	2	0.08%
1936	4	0.25%	1,567	99.68%	1	0.06%
1940	33	1.42%	2,288	98.28%	7	0.30%
1944	40	1.64%	2,401	98.36%	0	0.00%
1948	37	1.51%	287	11.73%	2,122	86.75%
1952	748	24.14%	2,350	75.86%	0	0.00%
1956	341	12.69%	1,969	73.28%	377	14.03%
1960	346	13.32%	830	31.96%	1,421	54.72%
1964	3,126	92.46%	255	7.54%	0	0.00%
1968	577	11.25%	1,477	28.79%	3,076	59.96%
1972	3,442	77.37%	835	18.77%	172	3.87%
1976	2,146	40.86%	2,991	56.95%	115	2.19%
1980	2,183	37.79%	3,467	60.02%	126	2.18%
1984	2,901	51.38%	2,725	48.26%	20	0.35%
1988	2,633	47.47%	2,881	51.94%	33	0.59%
1992	2,213	40.11%	2,902	52.59%	403	7.30%
1996	1,676	34.00%	2,990	60.65%	264	5.35%
2000	2,428	43.96%	3,041	55.06%	54	0.98%
2004	2,737	44.02%	3,420	55.01%	60	0.97%
2008	2,786	40.13%	4,105	59.12%	52	0.75%
2012	2,499	38.43%	3,959	60.88%	45	0.69%
2016	2,462	41.94%	3,337	56.85%	71	1.21%
2020	2,488	43.76%	3,105	54.62%	92	1.62%
2024	2,333	46.55%	2,630	52.47%	49	0.98%

== Education ==
- Public School Districts
  - East Tallahatchie School District (Charleston)
    - Charleston High School
  - West Tallahatchie School District (Webb)
    - West Tallahatchie High School
- Private Schools (None)
  - Strider Academy (closed in 2018)

Coahoma Community College is the designated community college.

== Communities ==
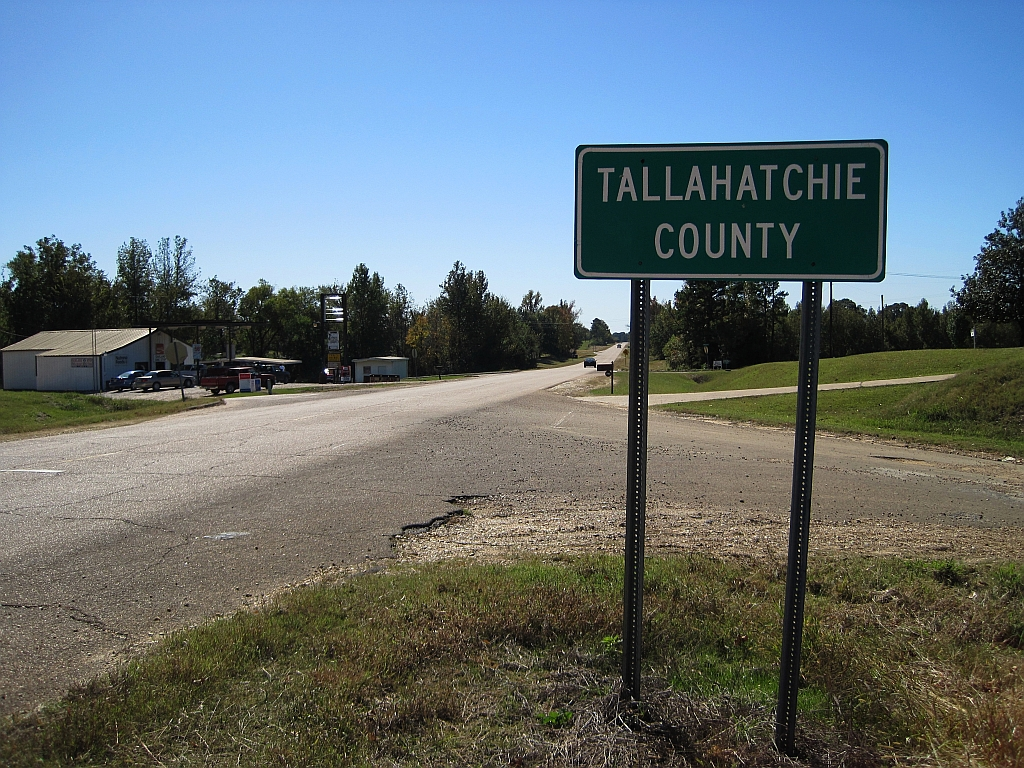

=== City ===
- Charleston (county seat)

=== Towns ===
- Sumner (county seat)
- Tutwiler
- Webb

=== Village ===
- Glendora

=== Unincorporated communities ===
- Brazil
- Cascilla
- Cowart
- Effie
- Enid
- Leverett
- Macel
- Minter City (partly in Leflore County)
- Paynes
- Philipp
- Sharkey
- Swan Lake
- Teasdale
- Tippo
- Vance (partly in Quitman County)
- Whitehead

=== Ghost towns ===
- Crevi
- Midway
- Murphreesboro
- Needmore

== See also ==
- National Register of Historic Places listings in Tallahatchie County, Mississippi
- USS Tallahatchie County (LST-1154)
