= Tippo, Mississippi =

- Unincorporated community
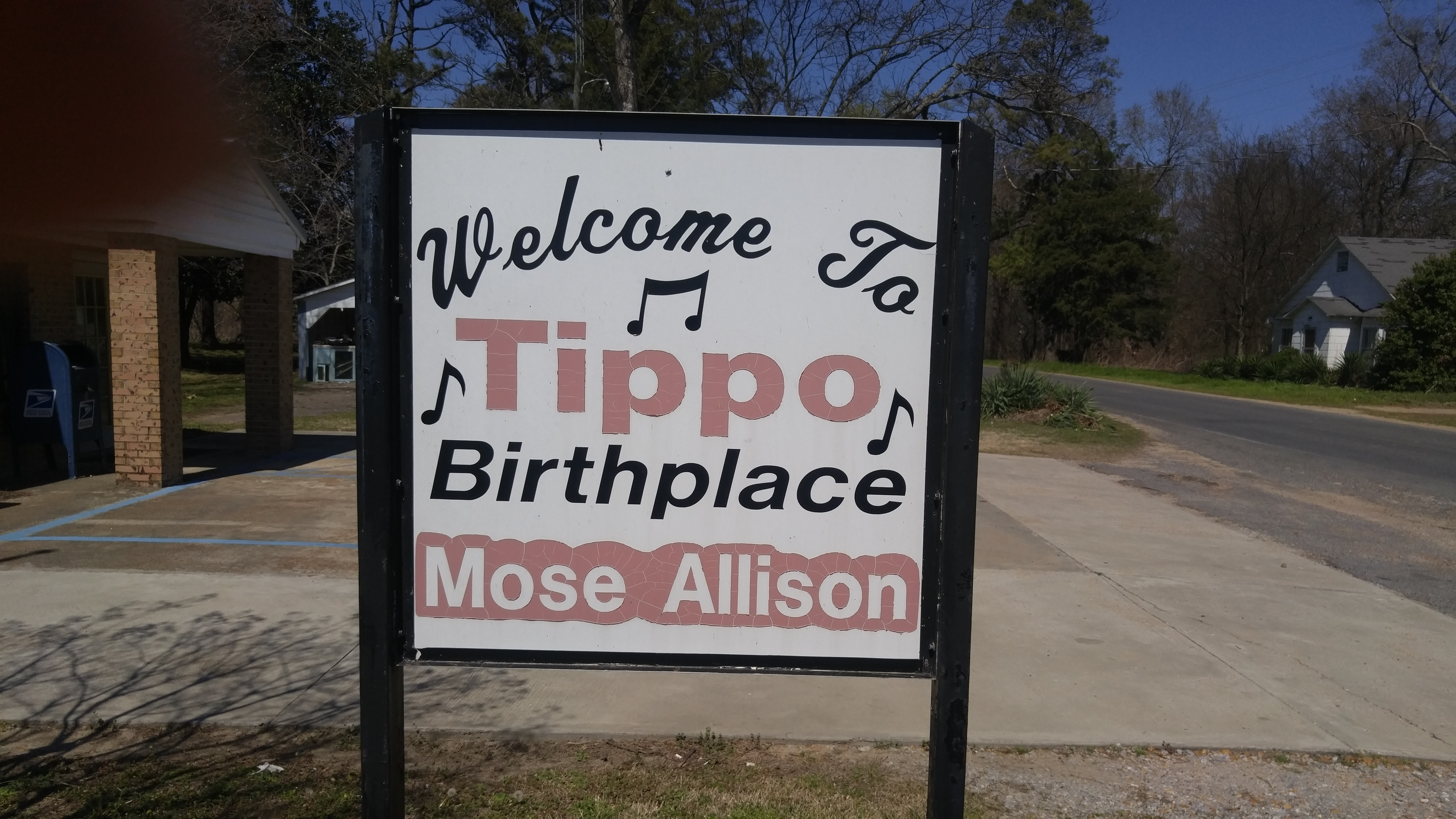

- Location within Mississippi Location within the United States
- Coordinates: 33°54′43″N 90°10′50″W
- Country: United States
- State: Mississippi
- County: Tallahatchie
- Elevation: 148 ft (45 m)
- Time zone: UTC-6 (Central (CST))
  - Summer (DST): UTC-5 (CDT)
- ZIP code: 38962
- Area code: 662
- GNIS feature ID: 678774

Tippo is an unincorporated community located in Tallahatchie County, Mississippi, United States, located approximately 10 miles (16 km) from Swan Lake; 11 miles (18 km) northeast of Glendora; and approximately 14 miles (23 km) from Charleston. Tippo is located at the intersection of Tippo and Sharkey roads.

Tippo has a post office with ZIP code 38962.

The community is named after Tippo Bayou.

== Education ==
Tippo is in the East Tallahatchie School District. Charleston High School is the area high school.

Coahoma Community College is the designated community college.

== Notable people ==
- Mose Allison, Blues musician
- Maxwell Street Jimmy Davis, electric blues singer, guitarist, and songwriter

== Gallery ==
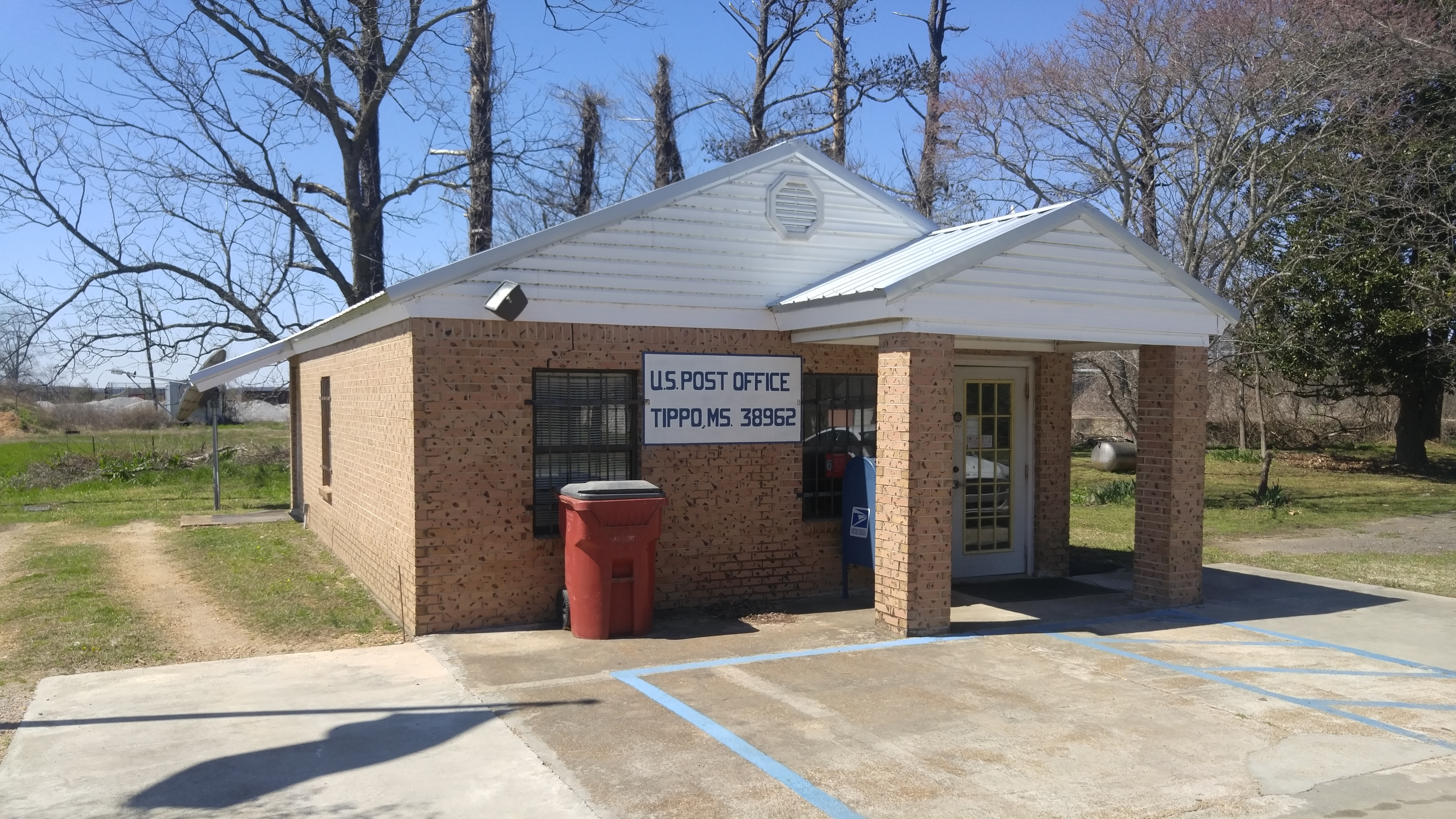
Tippo Post Office

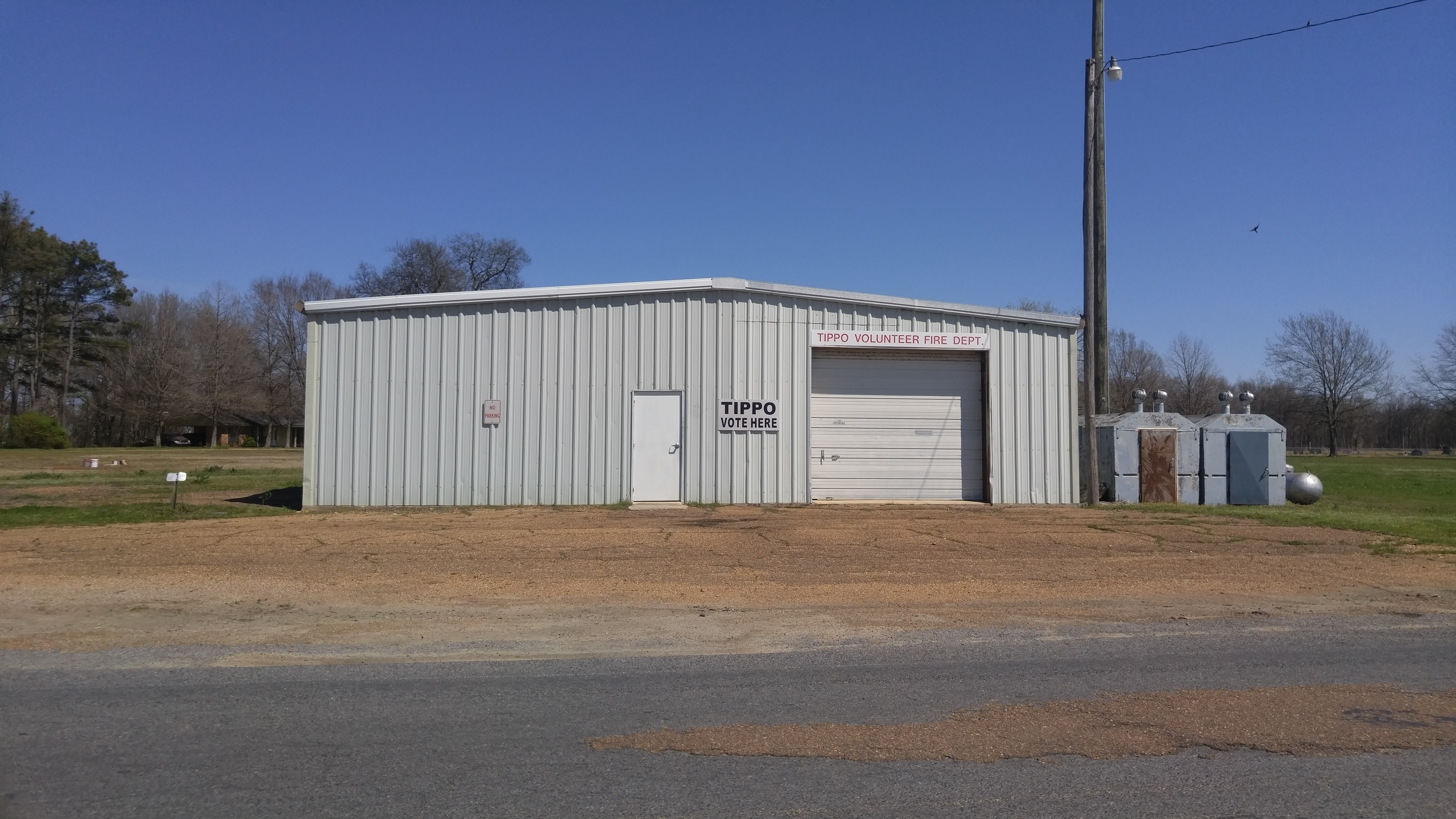
Tippo Volunteer Fire Department

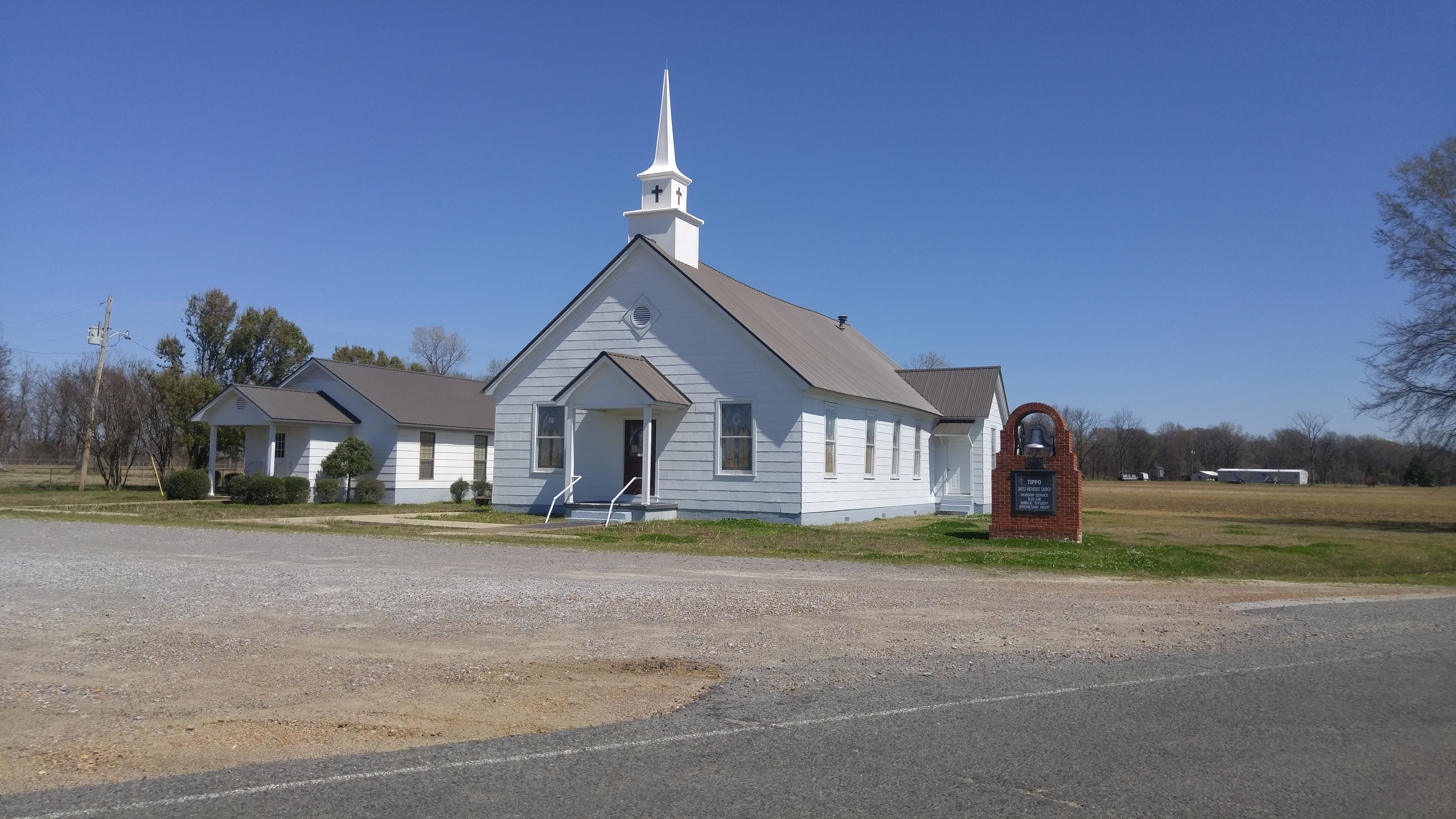
Tippo United Methodist Church

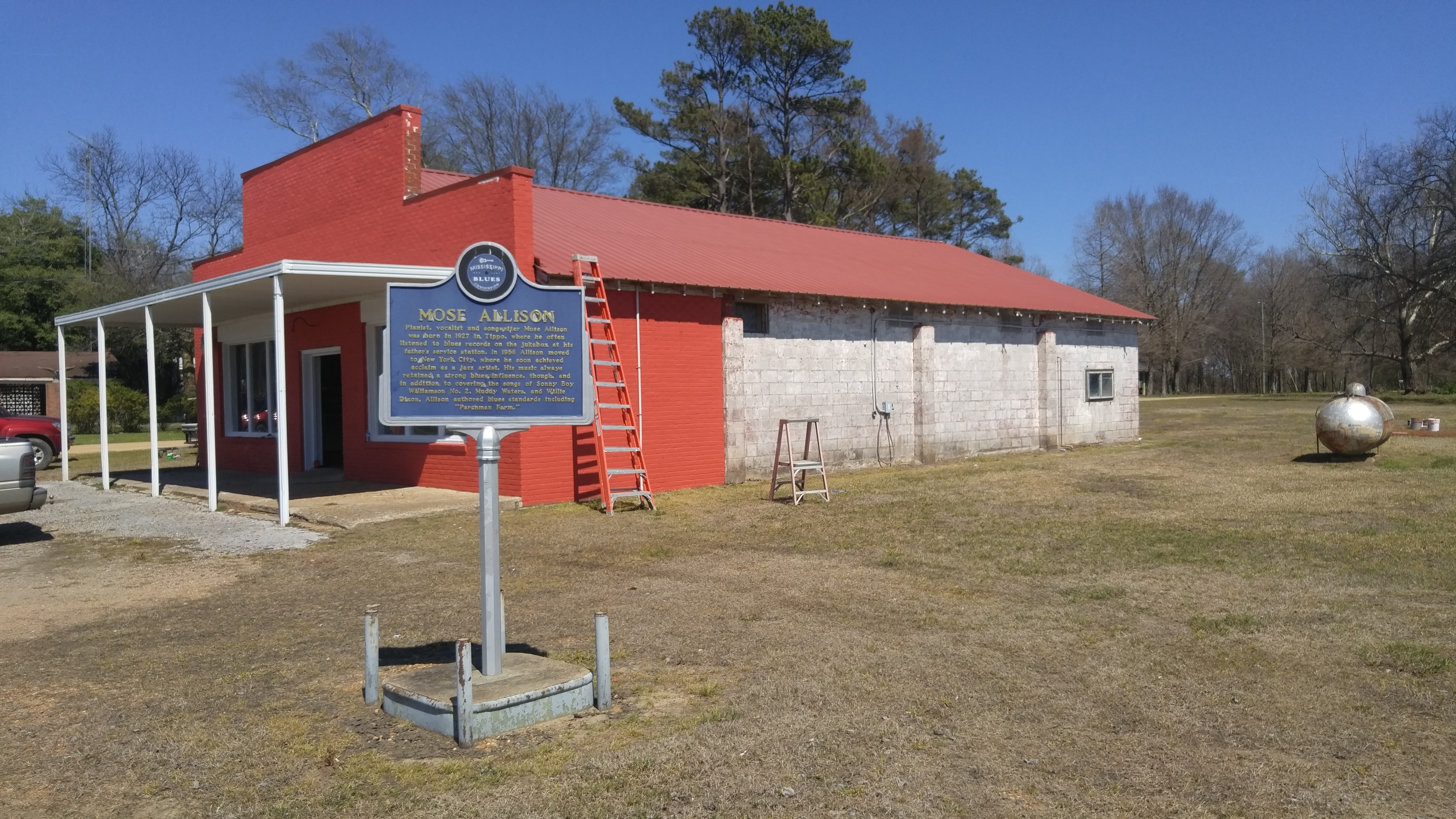
Mississippi Blues Trail marker for Mose Allison
