= Yelahanka (leafhopper) =

Scientific classification
- Kingdom: Animalia
- Phylum: Arthropoda
- Clade: Pancrustacea
- Class: Insecta
- Order: Hemiptera
- Suborder: Auchenorrhyncha
- Family: Cicadellidae
- Subfamily: Ledrinae
- Genus: Yelahanka; Viraktamath, Webb & Yeshwanth, 2021

Genus of leafhopper

Yelahanka is a genus of leafhopper belonging to the tribe Ledrini. The genus name was derived from Yelahanka, the suburban locality of Bangalore where the type species "Petalocephala bainbriggei" described by W L Distant in 1916 was found breeding on trees of Polyalthia longifolia.

== Species ==
- Yelahanka canaraica (Viraktamath, Webb & Yeshwanth, 2021) - India: Karnataka, Kerala
- Yelahanka granulosa (Distant, 1920) - India: Karnataka (=Petalocephala bainbriggei Distant 1916) - type species
- Yelahanka kodaiensis (Viraktamath, Webb & Yeshwanth, 2021) - India: Tamilnadu
- Yelahanka montana (Viraktamath, Webb & Yeshwanth, 2021) - India: Tamilnadu
- Yelahanka nepalica (Viraktamath, Webb & Yeshwanth, 2021) - Nepal
- Yelahanka punctata (Walker, 1851) - India: Arunachal Pradesh, Karnataka, Kerala, Maharashtra
- Yelahanka shillongensis (Viraktamath, Webb & Yeshwanth, 2021) - India: Meghalaya, West Bengal
- Yelahanka sikkimensis (Viraktamath, Webb & Yeshwanth, 2021) - India: Sikkim
- Yelahanka trifida (Viraktamath, Webb & Yeshwanth, 2021) - India: Arunachal Pradesh, Himachal Pradesh
