= Tituria =

Tituria may refer to:

- Tituria gens, an ancient Roman family
- Tituria (leafhopper), a genus of insects in the tribe Ledrini
