= Confucius (disambiguation) =

Confucius (551– 479 BCE) was a Chinese thinker and social philosopher.

Confucius may also refer to:

- Confucius (2010 film), a Chinese film directed by Hu Mei
- Confucius (1940 film), a Chinese film directed by Fei Mu
- Statue of Confucius (Houston), a 2009 bronze by Willy Wang in Houston, Texas, US
- 7853 Confucius, a main-belt asteroid
- Confucius Institute, a non-profit public institute which aims at promoting Chinese language and culture
- Confucius Peace Prize, a peace prize in China since 2010
- Confuciusornis, a genus of primitive crow-sized birds from the early Cretaceous Period
- Confuciusornithidae, a family of primitive birds from the early Cretaceous Period
- Confucius (leafhopper), a genus of leafhoppers in the order Hemiptera
- Mirina confucius, a moth of the family Endromidae
- Potanthus confucius, a butterfly of the family Hesperiidae
- Chinese steamer Confucius, early gunboat of the Qing Dynasty
