= Yelahanka punctata =

Scientific classification
- Kingdom: Animalia
- Phylum: Arthropoda
- Class: Insecta
- Order: Hemiptera
- Suborder: Auchenorrhyncha
- Family: Cicadellidae
- Genus: Yelahanka
- Species: Y. punctata

Binomial name
- Yelahanka punctata (Walker, 1851)

Synonyms
- Ledra punctata Walker, 1851; Petalocephala tabulata Distant, 1908

Species of insect

Yelahanka punctata is a species of leafhopper belonging to the tribe Ledrini. The species was described by Walker in 1851 based on a specimen collected in Kerala and given the name Ledra punctata.

== Distribution ==
This insect is only known to occur in India in the states of Arunachal Pradesh, Karnataka, Kerala and Maharashtra.
