= Ledra (disambiguation) =

Ledra was an ancient city kingdom in Cyprus.

Ledra may also refer to:

- Ledra, a genus of leafhoppers
- Ledra Street, a road in Nicosia
- The Ledra Palace hotel in Nicosia.
