= Rubria =

Rubria may refer to:

- Rubria gens
- Rubria (leafhopper), a genus of leafhoppers in the family Cicadellidae
