= Paynes, Mississippi =

- Unincorporated community
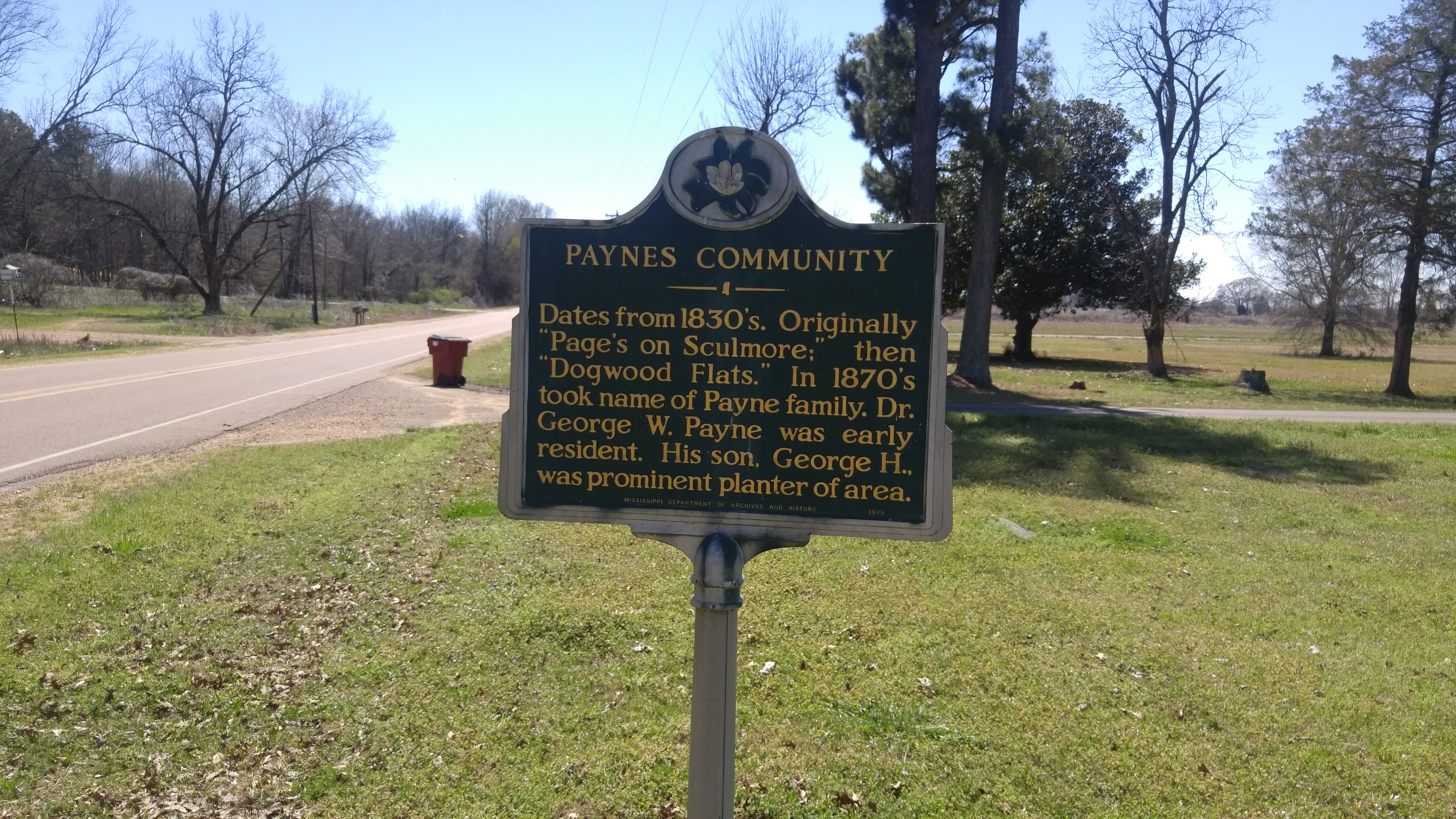

- Location within Mississippi Location within the United States
- Coordinates: 33°55′15″N 90°04′10″W
- Country: United States
- State: Mississippi
- County: Tallahatchie
- Elevation: 177 ft (54 m)
- Time zone: UTC-6 (Central (CST))
  - Summer (DST): UTC-5 (CDT)
- ZIP code: 38920
- Area code: 662
- GNIS feature ID: 675521

Paynes is an unincorporated community located in Tallahatchie County, Mississippi. Paynes is approximately 7 miles (11 km) northwest of Cascilla and approximately 6 miles (9.7 km) south of Charleston on Mississippi Highway 35.

A post office operated under the name Paynes from 1891 to 1958.

In 1900, Paynes had a population of 65.

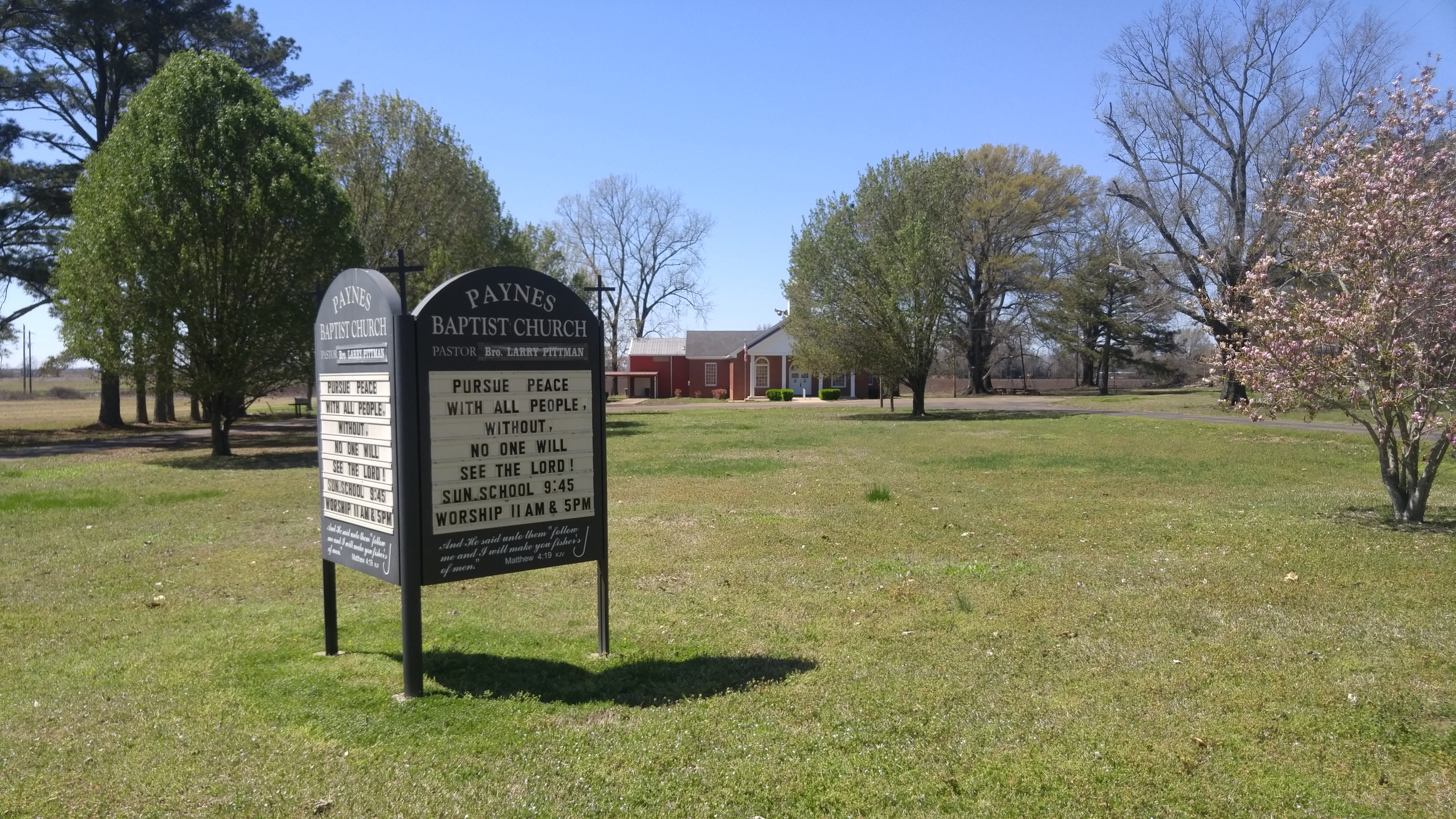
Paynes Baptist Church located along Mississippi Highway 35
