= Cascilla, Mississippi =

- Unincorporated community
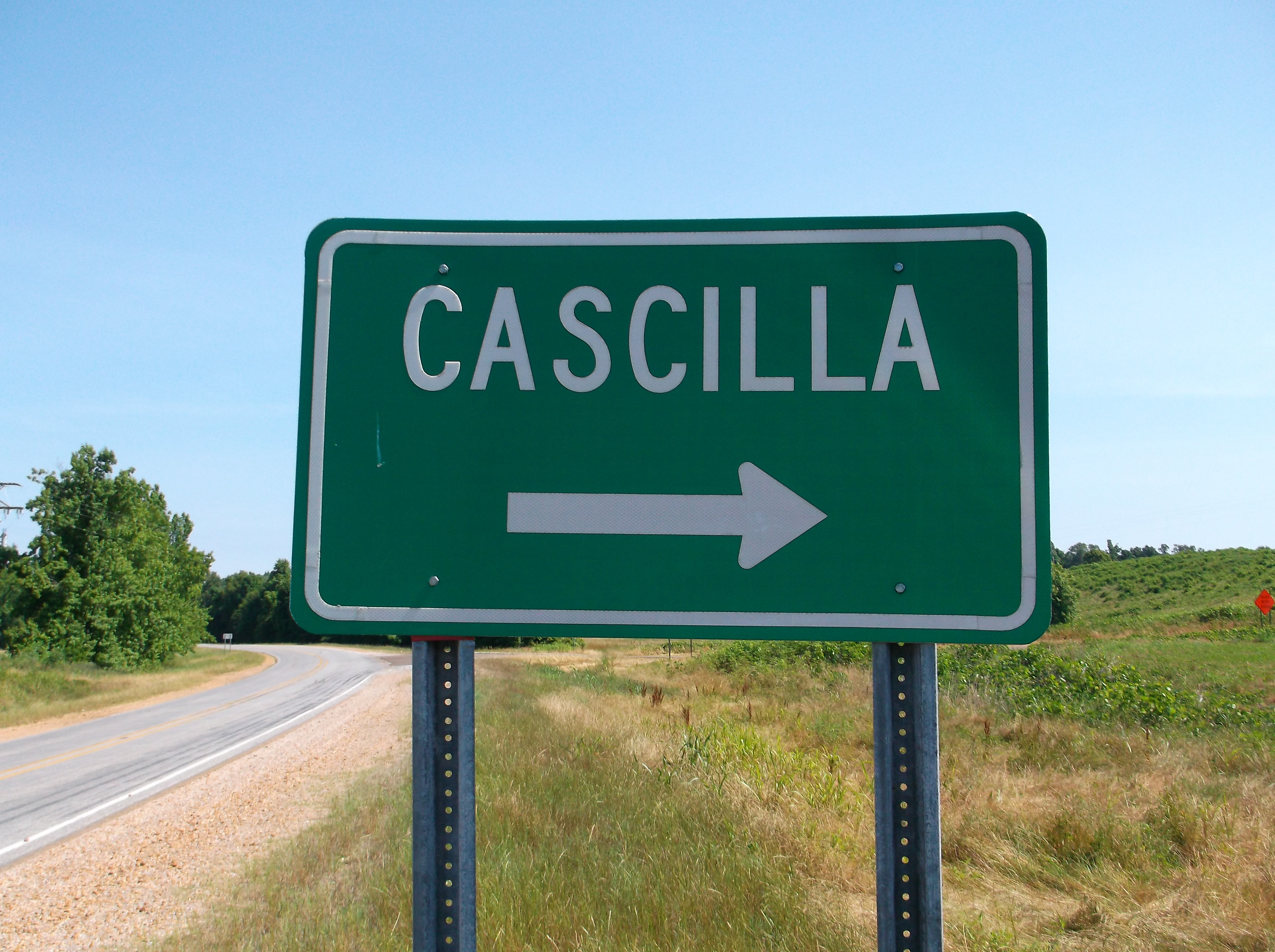

- Location within Mississippi Location within the United States
- Coordinates: 33°51′24″N 90°00′15″W
- Country: United States
- State: Mississippi
- County: Tallahatchie
- Elevation: 381 ft (116 m)
- Time zone: UTC-6 (Central (CST))
  - Summer (DST): UTC-5 (CDT)
- ZIP code: 38920
- Area code: 662
- GNIS feature ID: 668133

Cascilla is an unincorporated community located in Tallahatchie County, Mississippi. Cascilla is approximately 7 miles (11 km) southeast of Paynes and approximately 6 miles (9.7 km) south of Charleston on Cascilla Road.

Cascilla has a post office and a zip code of 38920.

== Notable people ==
- Halbert Marion Harris, entomologist
- Jamie L. Whitten, the second-longest serving U.S. Representative and the fifth-longest serving member of the U.S. Congress
