= C.A. Viraktamath =

Indian entomologist (born 1944)

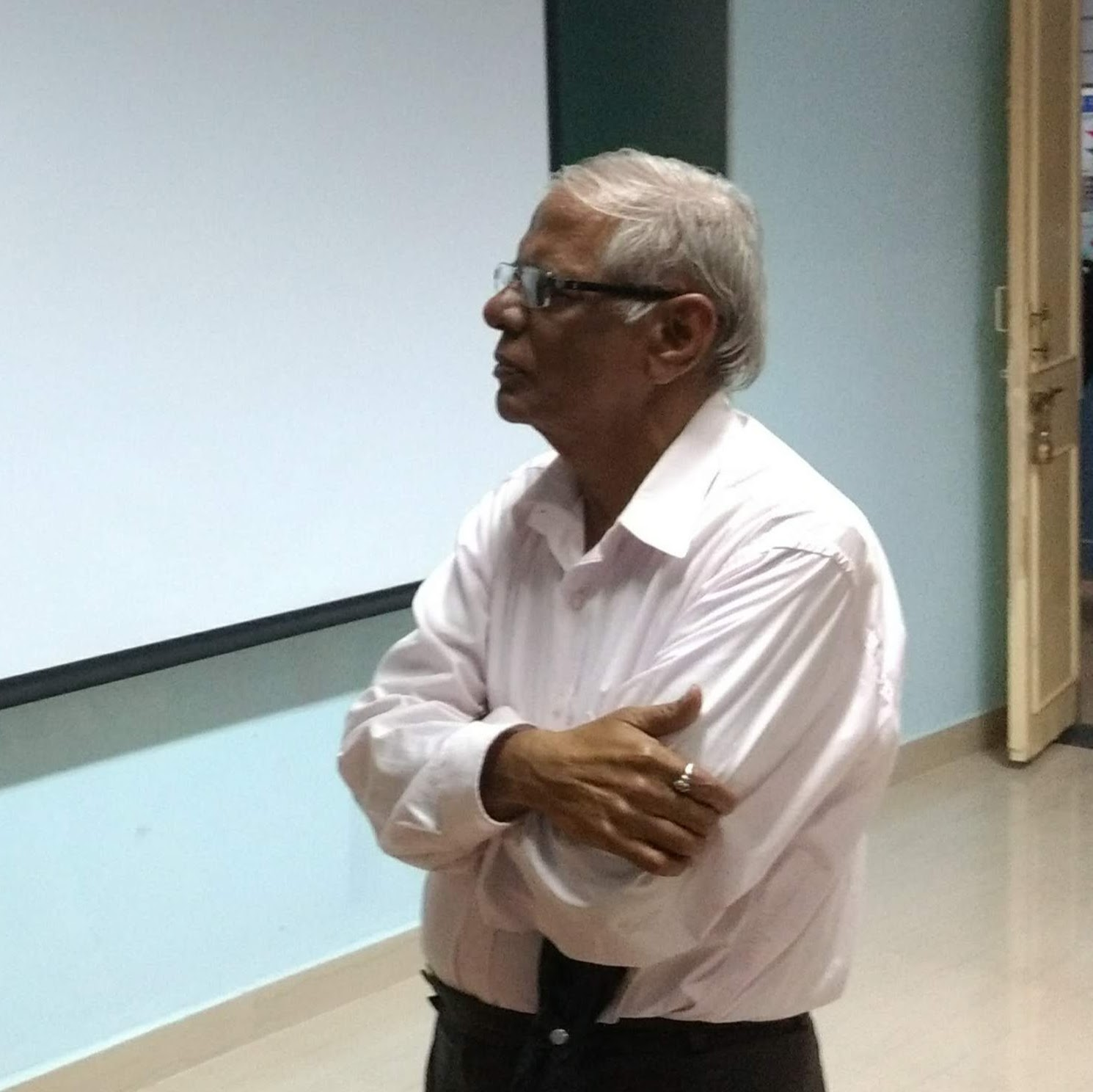
Professor Viraktamath in 2017

Chandrashekaraswami Adiveyya Viraktamath (in publications as C. A. Viraktamath or as Chandra A. Viraktamath) (born 31 January 1944) is an Indian entomologist who specializes in the systematics of leaf-hoppers, Cicadellidae. He served as a professor of entomology at the University of Agricultural Sciences, Bangalore.

== Biography ==
Viraktamath was born in Byadagi to Adiveyya and Neelambika and grew up across Karnataka as his father was posted at various places as a revenue officer. He went to the College of Agriculture, Dharwad and obtained a BSc in agriculture winning an ASPEE Gold Medal in plant pathology. He joined the University of Agricultural Sciences, Bangalore for his MSc and received training from the Indian entomologist G. P. Channabasavanna as well as the American entomologists H. M. Harris and J. H. Lilly who were visiting professors in insect systematics and physiology respectively. He was involved in studying ragi (Eleusine coracana) mosaic and streak diseases which were spread by leafhopper vectors and was recommended for further studies at the Oregon State University as a Ford Foundation scholar. He went to work on leafhopper systematics under Paul W. Oman, working on the Old World Agallinae. He returned to India after receiving his PhD and worked at the College of Agriculture, Dharwad. After a few years of teaching he moved in 1974 to the University of Agricultural Sciences, Bangalore. From 1995 he taught graduate students. He was involved in the development of the synoptic insect collections at the university which under his curatorship grew to 350,000 specimens with the oldest being a weevil collected by Leslie C. Coleman in October 1908. All the type specimens of species that he described (56 genera and 452 species) are included in the collection. He mentored numerous students in systematics particularly of insects of agricultural importance. He retired in 2004 but continued to work as an emeritus professor. A festschrift in his honour was released on his 75th birthday. A number of insects have been named in his honour.

He married Lalitha (née Shashikala Koranmath) in 1973 and they have two daughters.

== Publications ==
Major publications, especially taxonomic revisions include:

- Viraktamath, C. A. 1980. Indian Macropsinae (Homoptera: Cicadellidae) I. New species of Macropsis from south India. Journal of Natural History 14: 319–329.
- Viraktamath, C. A. 1981. Indian species of Grammacephalus (Homoptera: Cicadellidae). Colemania 1: 7–12.
- Viraktamath, C. A. 1981. Indian Macropsinae (Homoptera: Cicadellidae). II. Species described by W.L. Distant and description of new species from the Indian subcontinent. Entomologica Scandinavica 12: 295–310.
- Viraktamath, C. A. 1996. New Oriental Macropsinae with a key to species of the Indian subcontinent (Insecta: Auchenorrhyncha: Cicadellidae). Entomologische Abhandlungen, Stätliches Museum für Tierkunde in Dresden 57(7): 183–200.
- Viraktamath, C. A. 1998. A revision of the Idiocerine leafhopper genus Amritodus (Hemiptera: Cicadellidae) breeding on mango. Entomon 22(1997): 111–117.
- Viraktamath, C. A. 1998. A revision of the leafhopper tribe Paraboloponini (Hemiptera: Cicadellidae: Selenocephalinae) in the Indian subcontinent. The Bulletin of the British Museum of Natural History (Ent. Series) 67(2): 153–207.
- Viraktamath, C. A. 1999. New species of deltocephaline genus Acacimenus (Hemiptera: Cicadellidae) from India and Sri Lanka. Journal of the Bombay Natural History Society 96(2): 297–305.
- Viraktamath, C. A. 2004. Revision of the Agalliinae leafhopper genus Durgades (Hemiptera: Cicadellidae) along with description of six new species. pp. 363–380. In: Rajamohana, K., Sudheer, K., Girish Kumar, P. and Santhosh, S. (Eds) 2004. Perspectives on Biosystematics and Biodiversity, Prof. T.C. Narendran Commemoration Volume, Sersa Publisher, Calicut, India, xviii+666 pp.
- Viraktamath, C. A. 2004. A revision of the Varta-Stymphalus generic complex of the tribe Scaphytopiini (Hemiptera: Cicadellidae) from the Old World. Zootaxa 713: 1–47.
- Viraktamath, C. A. 2006. Revision of the leafhopper tribe Krisnini (Hemiptera: Cicadellidae: Iassinae) of the Indian subcontinent. Zootaxa 1338: 1–32.
- Viraktamath, C. A. 2011. Revision of the Oriental and Australian Agalliini (Hemiptera: Cicadellidae: Megophthalminae). Zootaxa 2844: 1–118.
- Viraktamath, C. A. 2012. Seven new species of the leafhopper genus Tambocerus (Hemiptera: Cicadellidae) from the Indian subcontinent. Zootaxa 3385: 43–61.
- Viraktamath, C. A. 2017. Review of the leafhopper tribe Adelungiini (Hemiptera: Cicadellidae: Megophthalminae) from the Indian subcontinent. Entomon 42(1): 47–58.
- Viraktamath, C. A. and Anantha Murthy, H. V. 1999. A revision of the leafhopper tribe Scaphytopiini from India and Nepal (Insecta, Hemiptera, Cicadellidae, Deltocephalinae). Senckenbergiana Biologica 79: 39–55.
- Viraktamath, C. A. and Anantha Murthy, H.V. 2014. Review of the genera Hishimonus Ishihara and Litura Knight (Hemiptera: Cicadellidae) from the Indian subcontinent with description of new species. Zootaxa 3785(2): 101–138. doi:10.11646/zootaxa.3785.2.1.
- Viraktamath, C. A. and Dietrich, C. H. 2017. New genus and species of the leafhopper tribe Phlogisini from India with description of male Phlogis mirabilis Linnavuori from Africa (Hemiptera: Auchenorrhyncha: Cicdellidae: Signoretiinae). Entomologica Americana 122(3): 451–460. doi:10.1664/1947-5144-122.3.451.
- Viraktamath, C. A. and Gnaneswaran, R. 2009. Three new species of Goniagnathus (Hemiptera: Cicadellidae) from the Indian subcontinent with description of a new subgenus. Zootaxa 2224: 51–59.
- Viraktamath, C. A. and Gnaneswaran, R. 2015. Review of the grass feeding genus Gurawa Distant (Hemiptera: Cicadellidae: Deltocephalinae) from the Indian subcontinent with description of two new species. Entomon [2013] 38(4): 193–212.
- Viraktamath, C. A. and Gonçalves, A. C. 2013. Review of Madagascaran Agalliini (Hemiptera: Cicadellidae: Megophthalminae) with descriptions of a new genus and six new species. Zootaxa 3616(1): 1–21.
- Viraktamath, C. A. and Webb, M. D. 2016. Review of the genus Signoretia (Hemiptera: Cicadellidae: Signoretiinae) of the Oriental region with description of nine new species. Zootaxa 4193(3): 486–516. doi:10.11646/zootaxa.4193.3.3.
- Viraktamath, C. A. and Webb, M. D. 2018. Revision of the evacanthine leafhoppers Hemiptera: Cicadellidae: Evacanthinae) of the Indian subcontinent. Zootaxa 4386: 1–78. doi:10.11646/zootaxa4386.1.1.
- Viraktamath, C. A. and Webb, M. D. 2019. Revision of the bamboo leafhopper tribe Mukariini (Hemiptera: Cicadellidae: Deltocephalinae) from the Indian subcontinent with description of new genera and species. Zootaxa 4547(1): 1–69.
- Viraktamath, C. A. and Webb, M. D. 2019. Revision of the Ulopinae leafhoppers (Hemiptera: Cicadellidae) of the Indian subcontinent, I. Ulopini genera: Daimachus, Radhades and Ulopsina. Zootaxa 4613(3): 557–577.

== Eponymous taxa ==
A number of taxa are named in honour of Viraktamath including:

Hemiptera
Caliscelidae

- Bolbonaso chandri Gnezdilov, 2015

Cicadellidae

- Pythochandra Wei & Webb, 2014
- Chandrashekara Dmitriev, 2020
- Agallia viraktamathi Dlabola, 1972
- Balclutha viraktamathi Webb & Vilbaste, 1994
- Cretacoelidia viraktamathi Wang, Dietrich & Zhang, 2018
- Discolopeus viraktamathi Stiller, 2019
- Drabescus viraktamathi Xu & Zhang, 2018
- Eleazara viraktamathi Huang & Zhang, 2018
- Gannia viraktamathi Zahniser & Dietrich, 2013
- Goniagnathus viraktamathi Duan & Zhang, 2012
- Hishimonus viraktamathi Knight, 1973
- Japanagallia viraktamathi Li, Dai & Li 2014
- Jogocerus viraktamathi Xue & Zhang 2017
- Kadrabia viraktamathi Dworakowska & Sohi 1978
- Kalasha viraktamathi Tang & Zhang 2019
- Krisna viraktamathi Yalin Zhang, Xinmin Zhang & Wu Dai, 2008
- Kusala viraktamathi Cao, Dmitriev & Zhang, 2018
- Longistyla viraktamathi Zhang & Webb, 2019
- Maiestas chandrai Fletcher & Dai, 2018
- Maiestas viraktamathi Zahniser, McKamey & Dmitriev, 2012
- Makilingia viraktamathi Dietrich & Zahniser, 2019
- Orosius viraktamathi El-Sonbati & Wilson, 2019
- Processina chandrai He, Yang & Yu, 2018
- Sangeeta viraktamathi Zhang, 2014
- Scaphoidella viraktamathi Dai & Dietrich, 2011
- Scaphoideus viraktamathi Meshram, 2014
- Singillatus viraktamathi (Nielson, 1990)
- Sophonia chandrai Meshram & Ramamurthy, 2013
- Tambocerus viraktmathi Rao, 1996
- Thagria viraktamathi Nielson, 2013
- Xenovarta viraktamathi Meshram, Stuti & Hashmi, 2018

Aleyrodidae

- Aleuroclava viraktamathi Pushpa & Sundararaj, 2010

Coleoptera

- Viraktamathia Devi, Ray & Ramamurthy, 2014
- Notomulciber (Micromulciber) viraktamathi Hiremath, 2018
- Brodskyella viraktamathi Ruizzer and Yeshwanth, 2019
- Epuraea (Micruria) viraktamathi Dasgupta, Pal & Hegde, 2016

Hymenoptera

- Isotrigona chandrai Shashidhar Viraktamath & Sejan Jose, 2017
- Anteon viraktamathi Olmi, 1987
- Gonatopus viraktamathi Olmi, 1987
- Eugahania viraktamathi Manickavasagam & Ayyamperumal, 2018
- Oomyzus viraktamathi Narendran, 2007
- Fidiobia virakthamati Veenakumari, 2018

Lepidoptera

- Frisilia chandrai Park & Shashank, 2018
- Herpetogramma viraktamathi, Murthy et al., 2025
