= Jamie Whitten =

American politician (1910–1995)

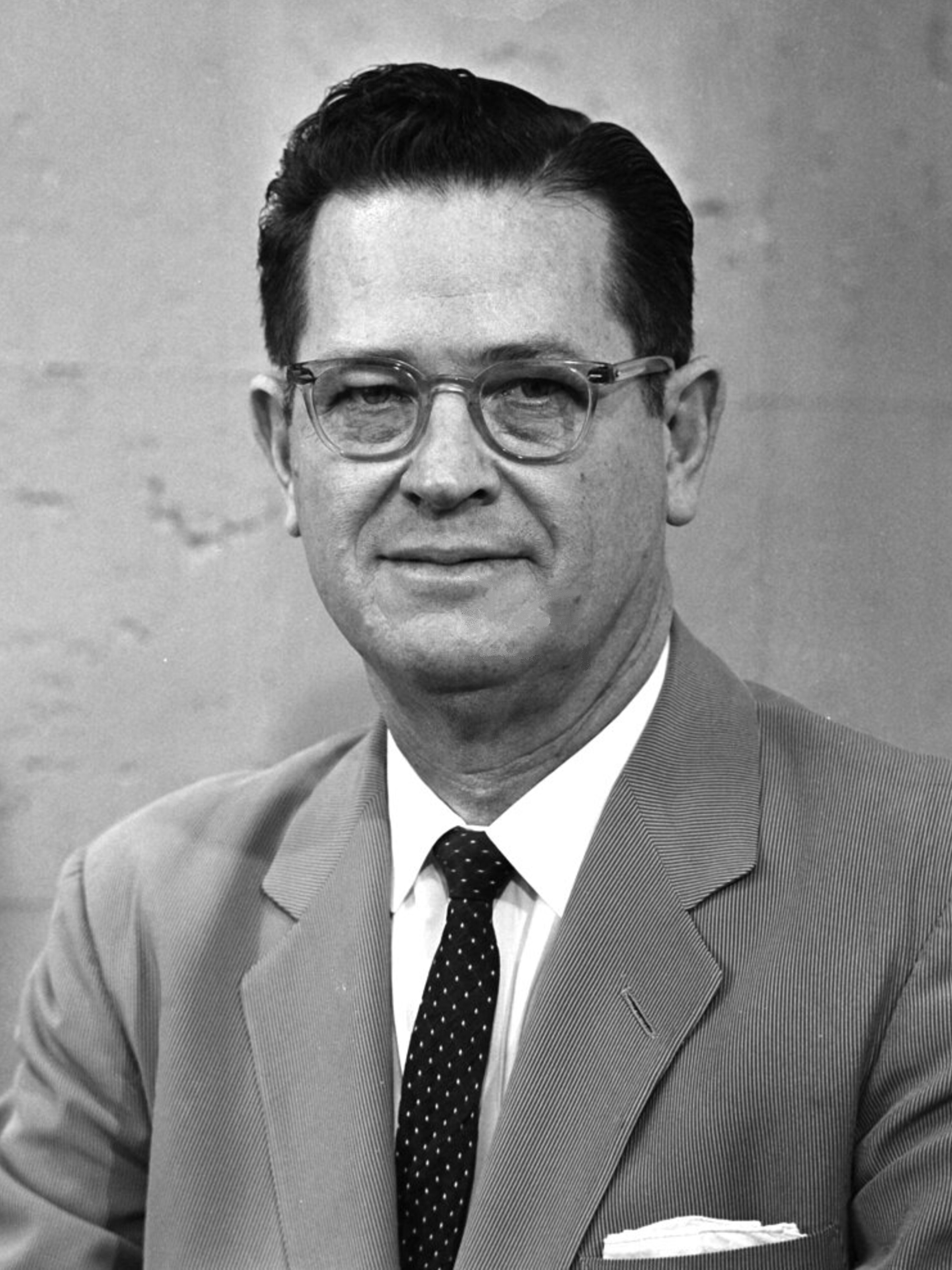
- Whitten in 1961

42nd Dean of the United States House of Representatives
- In office January 3, 1979 – January 3, 1995
- Preceded by: George H. Mahon
- Succeeded by: John Dingell

Chair of the House Appropriations Committee
- In office January 3, 1979 – January 3, 1993
- Preceded by: George H. Mahon
- Succeeded by: William Natcher

Member of the U.S. House of Representatives from Mississippi
- In office November 4, 1941 – January 3, 1995
- Preceded by: Wall Doxey
- Succeeded by: Roger Wicker
- Constituency: 2nd district (1941–1973); 1st district (1973–1995)

Member of the Mississippi House of Representatives
- In office 1931–1932

Personal details
- Born: Jamie Lloyd Whitten; April 18, 1910 Cascilla, Mississippi, U.S.
- Died: September 9, 1995 (aged 85) Oxford, Mississippi, U.S.
- Party: Democratic
- Education: University of Mississippi
- Jamie Whitten's voice Jamie Whitten on the urgency of continuing appropriations for FY1984; Recorded November 10, 1983

Jamie Lloyd Whitten (April 18, 1910 – September 9, 1995) was an American politician and member of the Democratic Party who represented his native state of Mississippi in the United States House of Representatives from 1941 to 1995. He was at the time of his departure the longest-serving U.S. Representative ever. From 1979 to 1995, he was Dean of the U.S. House of Representatives. He is the longest-serving member of Congress ever from Mississippi. He was a New Deal liberal on economic matters, and took a leading role in Congress in forming national policy and spending regarding agriculture. Whitten was the last remaining member of Congress to have served during the FDR administration.

== Early life, education, and early career ==
Jamie Whitten was born in Cascilla, Mississippi. He attended local public schools and the University of Mississippi where he was a member of Beta Theta Pi fraternity. He worked as a school teacher and principal and was elected as a Democrat to the Mississippi House of Representatives, where he served in 1931 and 1932. He was admitted to the bar in 1932, and from 1933 to 1941, he was District Attorney of Mississippi's 17th District, which included his home county of Tallahatchie.

== U.S. House of Representatives ==
=== Elections ===
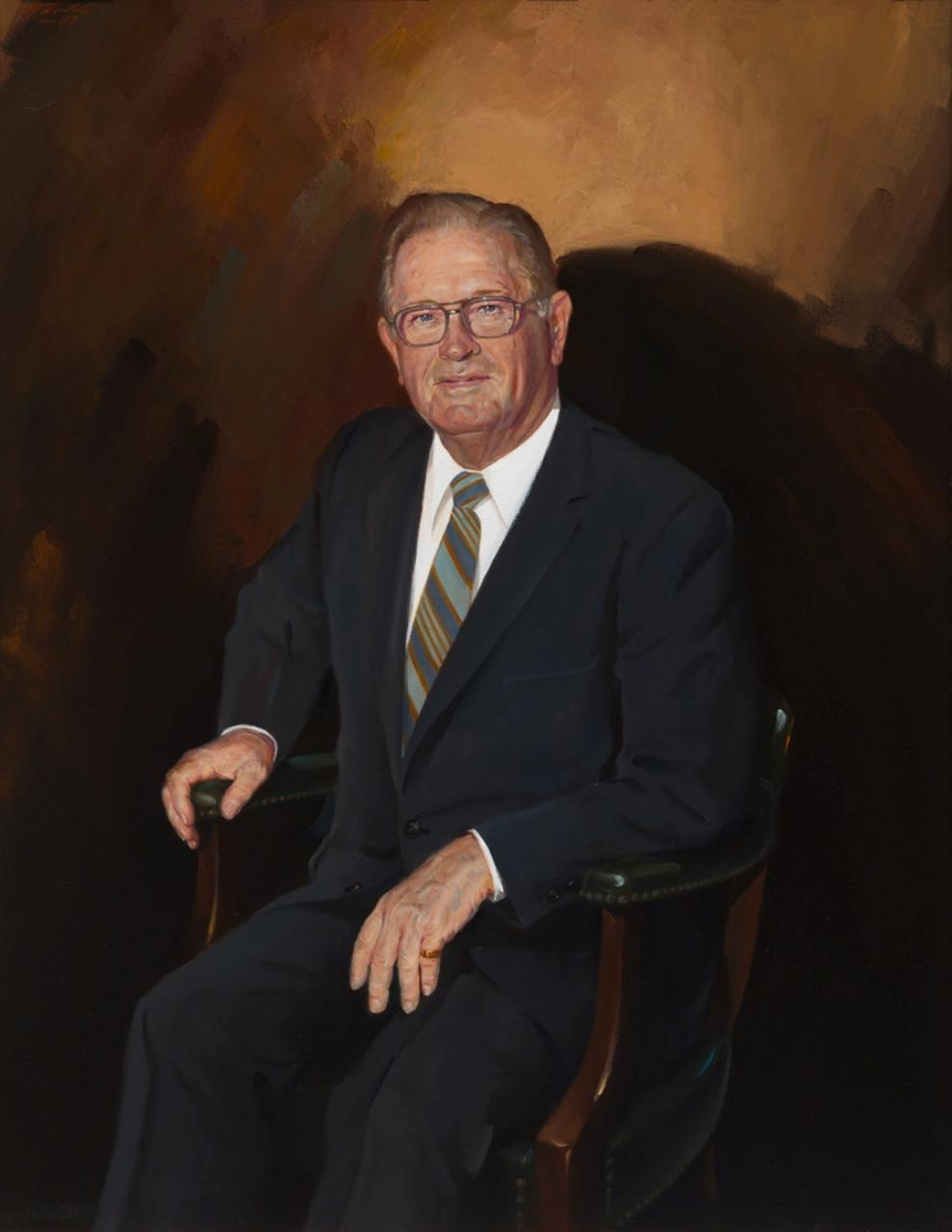
1983 portrait of Whitten

In 1941, Whitten was elected as a Democrat to the United States House of Representatives in a special election to represent the state's 2nd District, in the northern part of the state. The seat had become vacant as a result of incumbent Congressman Wall Doxey's election to the United States Senate. He was elected to a full term in 1942 and was re-elected 25 more times.

Whitten's district was renumbered as the 1st District after the 1970 Census.

=== Tenure as leader in agricultural policy ===
Whitten had the support of the Democratic caucus and served as chair of the Appropriations subcommittee on agriculture (1949–1953 and 1954–1978). He was chair of the entire committee 1979–1992. Throughout that period he had a decisive voice on agricultural spending and to a large extent on policies.

In 1977, his subcommittee lost control of environmental issues. He lost his influence after suffering a debilitating stroke in February 1992. As a champion for American farmers, he fought against the FDA's early 1970s recommendation of restricting the use of antibiotics in livestock. He required that scientists prove the danger of antibiotic use.

Whitten was an ardent New Dealer who supported most liberal spending issues. He supported distribution of free food to the poor from surplus commodity stocks, school lunch programs and food stamps in coalition with urban Democrats. In the 1980s, he clashed with the conservative Reagan administration on policy matters. He voted against Reagan's economic plans, tax cuts, increased defense spending, balanced budget initiative, tort reform, welfare reform, abortion restrictions, missile defense system, and the Persian Gulf War. Although Whitten represented a district that grew increasingly suburban and Republican-leaning from the 1970s onward, his opposition to Reagan's program did not affect him at the ballot box. Indeed, his seniority and popularity resulted in his facing only token, or "sacrificial lamb", opponents on the occasions he faced any opposition at all, even in years when Republican presidential candidates carried the district by landslide margins. Nonetheless, it was assumed that he would be succeeded by a Republican when he retired.

=== Record on racial issues ===
Whitten was originally a segregationist, as were many of his colleagues from Mississippi and the rest of the South. He signed the Southern Manifesto condemning the Supreme Court's decision in Brown v. Board of Education, which ordered the desegregation of public schools. Along with virtually the entire Mississippi congressional delegation, he voted against the Civil Rights Acts of 1957, the Civil Rights Acts of 1960, the Civil Rights Acts of 1964, and the Civil Rights Acts of 1968 as well as the 24th Amendment to the U.S. Constitution and the Voting Rights Act of 1965. Whitten later apologized for these votes, calling them a "mistake" caused by severe misjudgment. He voted for the Civil Rights Act of 1991.

=== Committees ===
Throughout most of his tenure in the House, Whitten served on the Appropriations Committee, ultimately serving as chairman from the 1979 retirement of George H. Mahon until newly-elected Democrats in the House Democratic Caucus removed him in favor of William Huston Natcher after the 1992 election. In 1985, when then-junior Appropriations Committee member Dick Durbin spoke with Chairman Whitten about possibly sitting on the Budget Committee, Whitten told him, "Well, if you want to be on that committee, you can be on that committee, but I want you to remember one thing, the Budget Committee deals in hallucinations and the Appropriations Committee deals in facts." While on the floor of the Senate on March 21, 2018, now Senator Durbin referred to that quote from Whitten as "Whitten's Law," which implies that the Budget Committee is a political branch that makes budget promises while the Appropriations Committee is obliged to either fulfill or break those promises during the budget-making process.

=== Retirement from the House ===
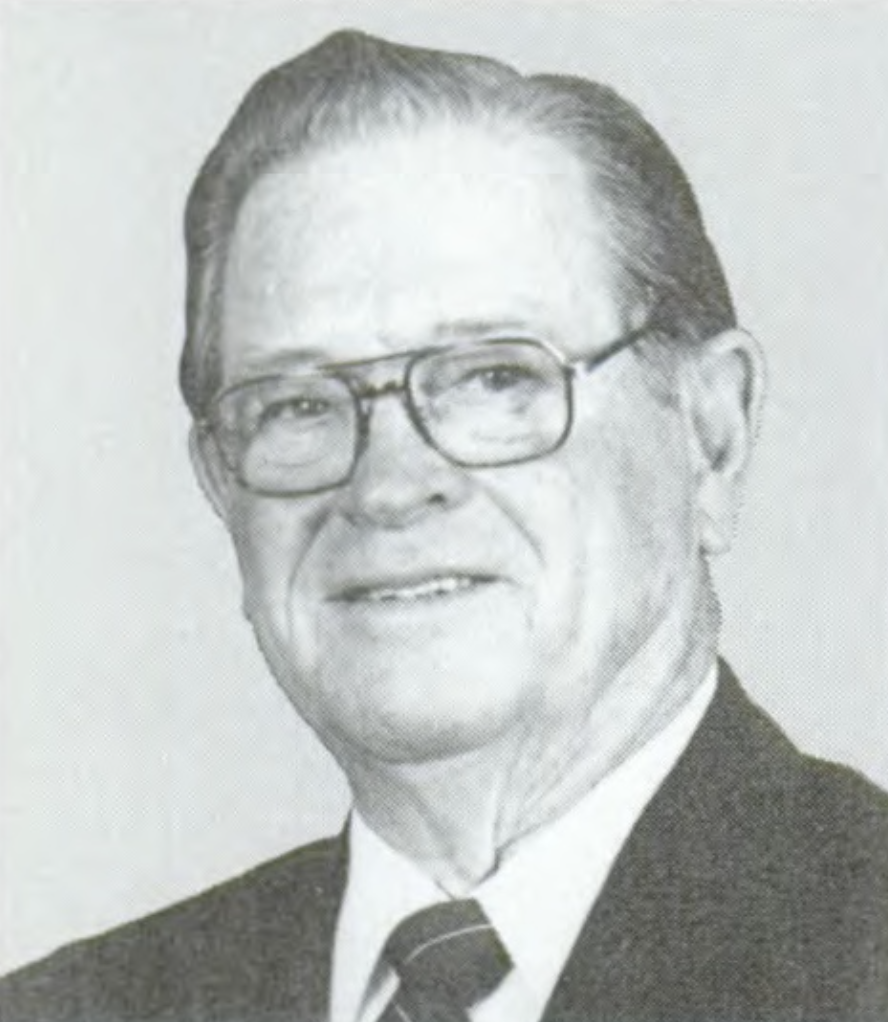
Whitten's official photo for the 102nd United States Congress, 1991

Declining to run for reelection to a historic 28th term in 1994, Whitten retired from the House as America's longest-serving Congressman (53 years and two months). He retired to his home in Oxford, Mississippi and died there on September 9, 1995, aged 85. His service from November 4, 1941, to January 3, 1995 set a record for length of service in the House, which remained unbroken until February 11, 2009, when Michigan Rep. John Dingell surpassed it. Whitten is also the 5th longest-serving Congressmember (House and/or Senate) behind Dingell, Daniel Inouye, Carl Hayden, and Robert Byrd.

== Publications ==
Whitten authored That We May Live, written largely as a pro-development, pro-chemical pesticide answer to Rachel Carson's Silent Spring, the seminal 1962 book that helped spur the modern environmental movement.

== Legacy and honors ==
The Jamie Whitten Historical Site is located at the bridge of the Natchez Trace Parkway over the Tennessee-Tombigbee Waterway, two projects that Whitten had successfully fought to fund over his house tenure, overcoming strong opposition from conservatives to their construction using federal funds.

In June 1995, Congress renamed the main headquarters building of the United States Department of Agriculture in Washington, D.C. the Jamie L. Whitten Building in his honor.

The Beta Beta chapter of Beta Theta Pi fraternity at the University of Mississippi has named their leadership award after brother Whitten. Each year, one graduating brother is selected to receive the award based on his leadership and commitment to the chapter, university, and community.

U.S. House of Representatives
Preceded by Wall Doxey	Member of the U.S. House of Representatives from Mississippi's 2nd congressional district 1941–1973	Succeeded by David R. Bowen
Preceded by Thomas Abernethy	Member of the U.S. House of Representatives from Mississippi's 1st congressional district 1973–1995	Succeeded by Roger Wicker
Preceded by George H. Mahon	Chair of the House Appropriations Committee; 1979–1993	Succeeded by William Natcher
Honorary titles
Preceded by George H. Mahon	Dean of the United States House of Representatives; 1979–1995	Succeeded by John Dingell
