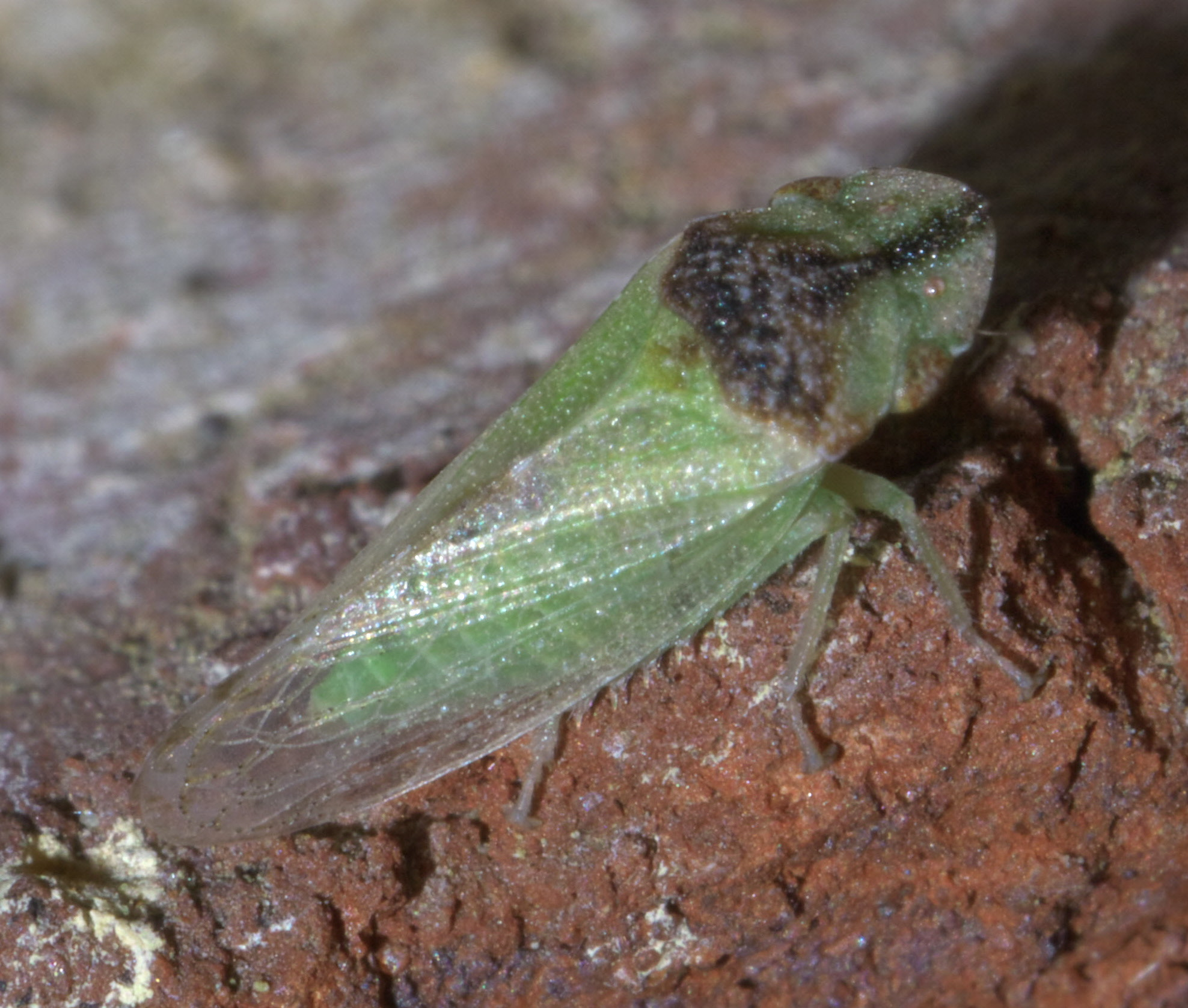
- Xerophloea viridis

Scientific classification
- Kingdom: Animalia
- Phylum: Arthropoda
- Class: Insecta
- Order: Hemiptera
- Suborder: Auchenorrhyncha
- Family: Cicadellidae
- Subfamily: Ledrinae
- Genus: Xerophloea; Germar, 1839

= Xerophloea =

Genus of leafhoppers

Xerophloea is a genus of leafhoppers in the family Cicadellidae. There are about 13 described species in Xerophloea.

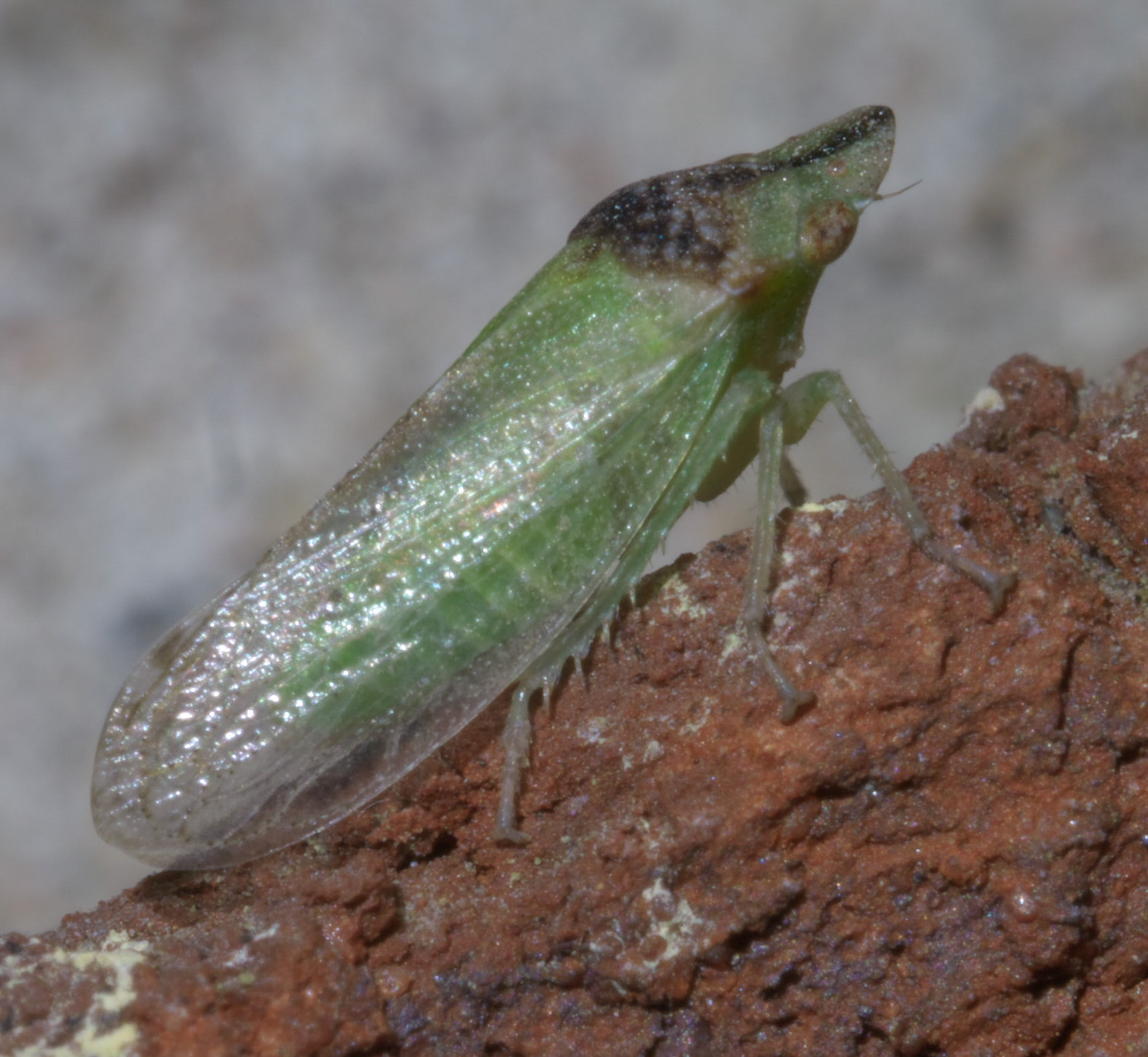
Xerophloea viridis

== Species ==
These 13 species belong to the genus Xerophloea:

- Xerophloea breviceps Osborn 1935^{c g}
- Xerophloea cephalica Oman 1936^{c g}
- Xerophloea difformis Oman 1936^{c g}
- Xerophloea elegans Oman 1936^{c g}
- Xerophloea elongata Oman 1936^{c g}
- Xerophloea foveolata Fieber 1866^{c g}
- Xerophloea gigas Oman 1936^{c g}
- Xerophloea magna Oman 1936^{c g}
- Xerophloea majesta Lawson, 1931^{c g b}
- Xerophloea major Baker, 1898^{c g b}
- Xerophloea peltata^{b}
- Xerophloea viridis (Fabricius, 1794)^{c g b}
- Xerophloea zionis^{b}

Data sources: i = ITIS, c = Catalogue of Life, g = GBIF, b = Bugguide.net
