= Rubria (leafhopper) =

Scientific classification
- Domain: Eukaryota
- Kingdom: Animalia
- Phylum: Arthropoda
- Class: Insecta
- Order: Hemiptera
- Suborder: Auchenorrhyncha
- Family: Cicadellidae
- Subfamily: Ledrinae
- Genus: Rubria; Stål, 1865

Type species
- Rubria sanguinosa

Genus of Australian leafhoppers

Rubria is a genus of leafhoppers in the family Cicadellidae, the species of which are found mostly in Australia. Swedish entomologist Carl Stål described the group as a subgenus of the genus Petalocephala, but later raised it to a genus in its own right in 1966 by J.W. Evans. The genus is a distinct lineage within the family and is placed in its own tribe Rubrini.
