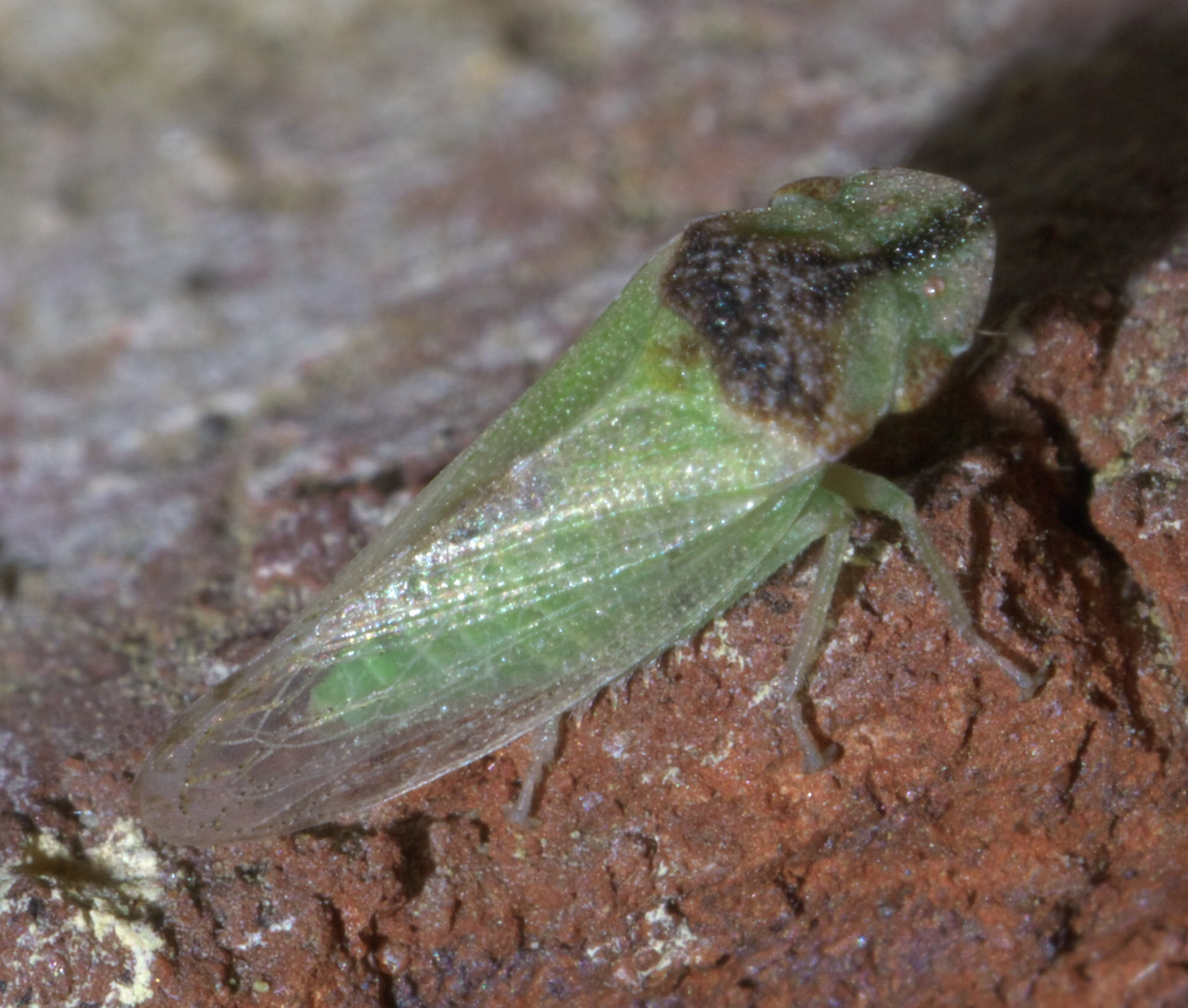

Scientific classification
- Domain: Eukaryota
- Kingdom: Animalia
- Phylum: Arthropoda
- Class: Insecta
- Order: Hemiptera
- Suborder: Auchenorrhyncha
- Family: Cicadellidae
- Genus: Xerophloea
- Species: X. viridis

Binomial name
- Xerophloea viridis (Fabricius, 1794)

= Xerophloea viridis =

Species of true bug

Xerophloea viridis is a species of leafhopper in the family Cicadellidae.
