= Oxberry =

Oxberry may refer to:

== Places ==
- Oxberry, Mississippi, an unincorporated community located in Grenada County

== People with the surname ==
- Dianne Oxberry (1967–2019), English broadcaster and weather presenter
- William Oxberry (1784–1824), English actor, writer, and publisher
- John Oxberry (1918–1974) founder of Oxberry LLC, and inventor; see Rostrum camera
