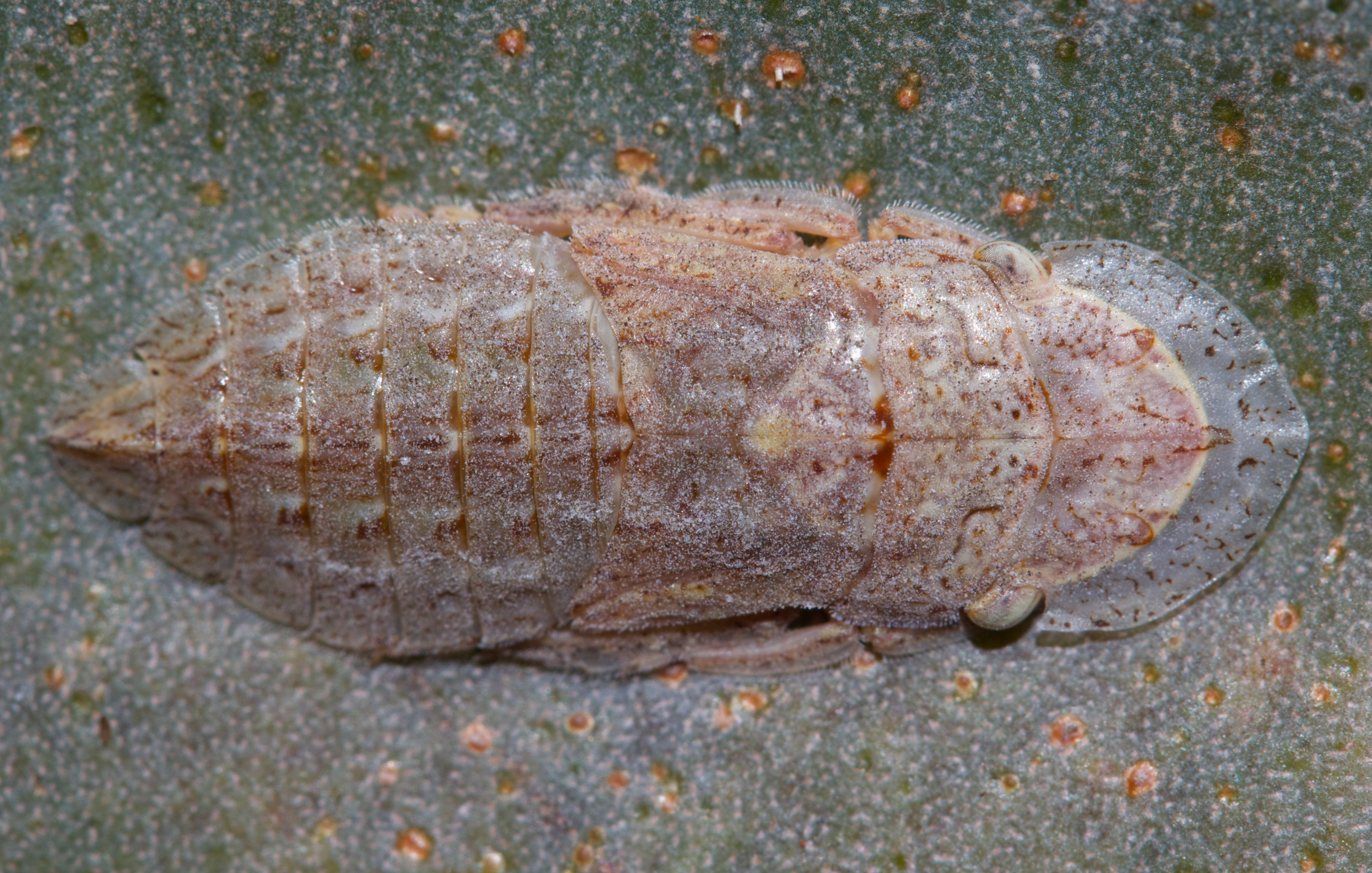
- Stenocotis depressa

Scientific classification
- Kingdom: Animalia
- Phylum: Arthropoda
- Clade: Pancrustacea
- Class: Insecta
- Order: Hemiptera
- Suborder: Auchenorrhyncha
- Family: Cicadellidae
- Subfamily: Ledrinae
- Genus: Stenocotis; Stål, 1854

= Stenocotis =

Genus of insects

Stenocotis is a genus of leafhoppers in the family Cicadellidae.
