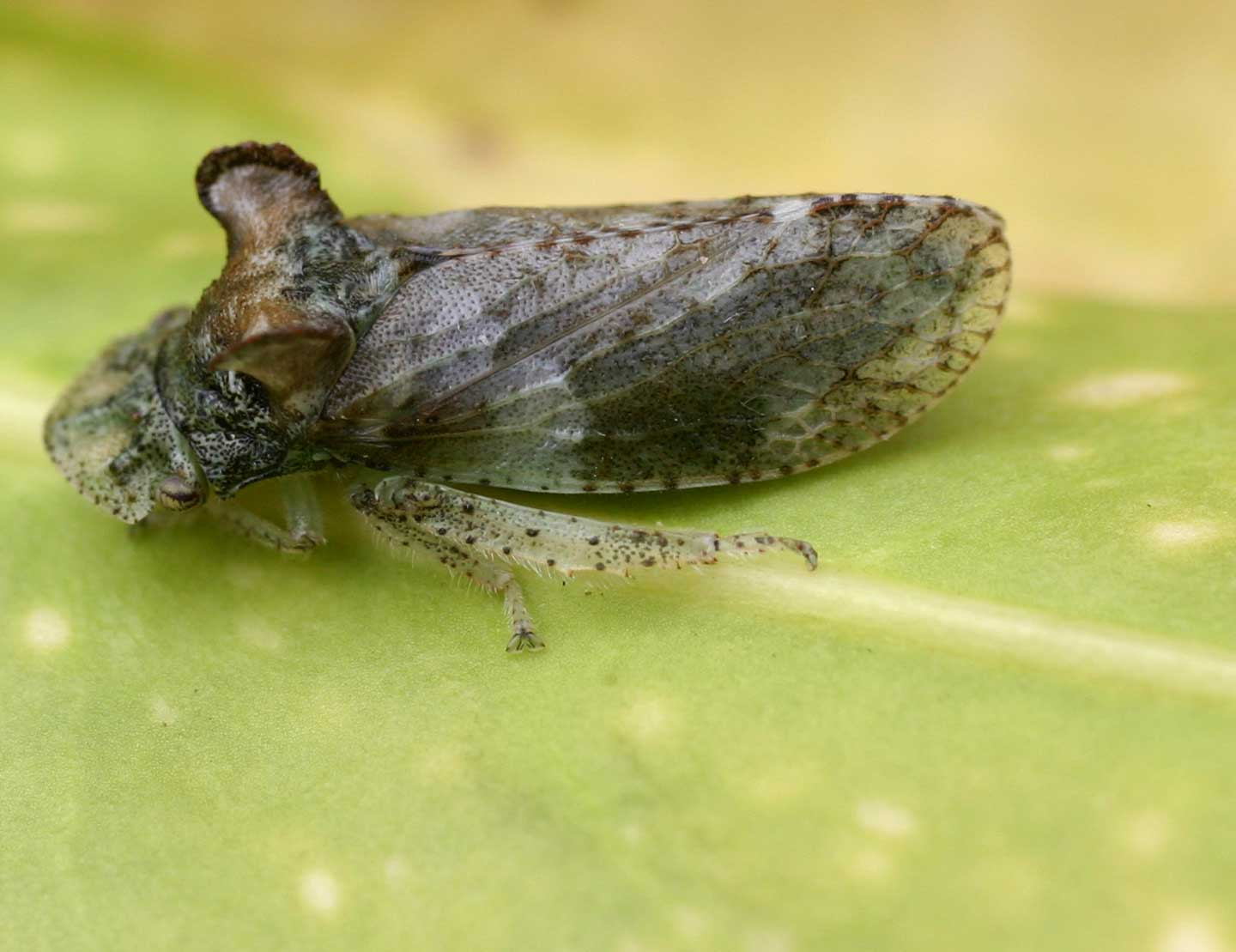

Scientific classification
- Domain: Eukaryota
- Kingdom: Animalia
- Phylum: Arthropoda
- Class: Insecta
- Order: Hemiptera
- Suborder: Auchenorrhyncha
- Family: Cicadellidae
- Subfamily: Ledrinae
- Tribe: Ledrini
- Genus: Ledra
- Species: L. aurita

Binomial name
- Ledra aurita (Linnaeus 1758)

= Ledra aurita =

Species of true bug

Ledra aurita or the eared leafhopper is a species of bug in the family Cicadellidae. It is the only species of the subfamily Ledrinae that lives in Europe, including the British Isles.

== Distribution & habitat ==
Ledra aurita lives in the deciduous forests of Europe and Asia, where it is mostly found in the treetops. Though common in some areas, it is hard to spot due to its bark-like camouflage. The species can be found on lichen-covered trees, especially oaks.

== Description ==
The species is large and grey with ear-like projections on the pronotum. They are 13–18 millimetres (0.51–0.71 in) long.

== Lifestyle ==
The eared leafhopper is adapted to life on tree bark. Both the nymphs and the adult animals are very well camouflaged and can be hard to notice against a barky background. They feed on sap from the leaves and branches of deciduous trees and bushes with their specially built, tree-piercing mouthparts. The species is polyphagous, which means that it is not very particular about its food. Although it prefers oaks, it also eats from a large number of other woody plants such as birch or poplar and occasionally linden, beech, apple, maple, alder and hazel trees. Adults like to fly towards light at night and can sometimes be found near human habitation.
