= Halbert Marion Harris =

American entomologist

Halbert Marion Harris (18 July 1900 – 18 August 2000) was an American entomologist who worked on the systematics of the American Nabidae and worked with the Ford Foundation in the development of entomology in India.

Harris was born in Cascilla, studied BSA at Mississippi A&M College in 1923 and joined the Iowa State College where he received an MS. He became the chairman of the department of zoology and entomology in 1946 at Iowa State and remained in position until 1964 when he took a position with the Ford Foundation in India. He became a visiting professor at the University of Agricultural Sciences in Bangalore where he developed a Ph.D. program. He was also a visiting professor at the Louisiana State University from 1972 to 1980.

While in Ohio he studied under Carl Drake and took an interest in the Nabidae, publishing a monograph of the family members in North America. He described a large number of species in the course of his career.

Harris married Katherine Day in 1927 and they had one son.
