= Confucius (leafhopper) =

Scientific classification
- Kingdom: Animalia
- Phylum: Arthropoda
- Clade: Pancrustacea
- Class: Insecta
- Order: Hemiptera
- Suborder: Auchenorrhyncha
- Family: Cicadellidae
- Tribe: Ledrini
- Genus: Confucius; Distant, 1907

Genus of leafhoppers

Confucius is a genus of leafhoppers belonging to the family Cicadellidae.

Species:

- Confucius bituberculatus Distant, 1908
- Confucius cameroni Distant, 1910
- Confucius dispar Nast, 1952
- Confucius granulatus Distant, 1907
- Confucius maculatus Cai, 1994
- Confucius ocellatus Distant, 1908
- Confucius polemon Linnavuori, 1972
- Confucius zombana Distant, 1910
