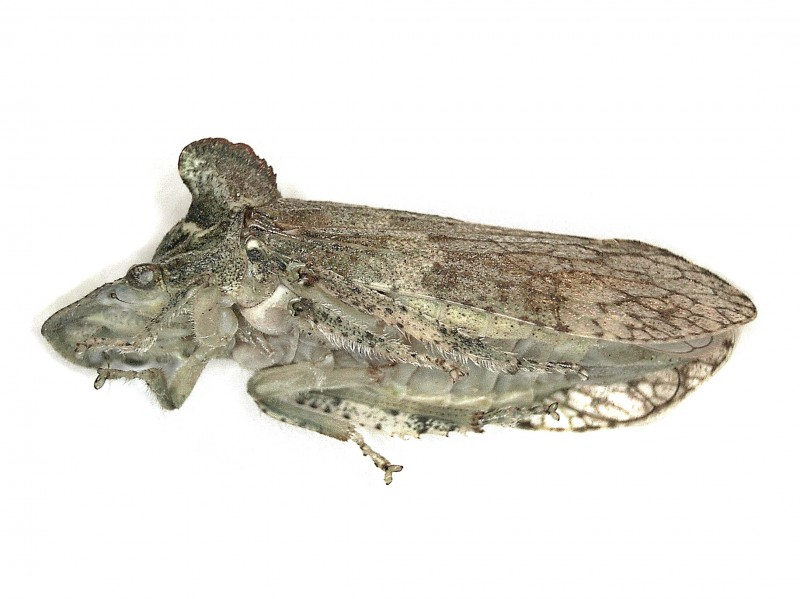
- Ledra aurita

Scientific classification
- Kingdom: Animalia
- Phylum: Arthropoda
- Clade: Pancrustacea
- Class: Insecta
- Order: Hemiptera
- Suborder: Auchenorrhyncha
- Family: Cicadellidae
- Subfamily: Ledrinae
- Tribe: Ledrini
- Genus: Ledra; Fabricius, 1803

= Ledra (leafhopper) =

Genus of leafhoppers

Ledra is the type genus of leafhoppers in the subfamily Ledrinae and the tribe Ledrini. Ledra aurita can be found in Europe but most species occur in Asia.

== Species ==
The Catalogue of Life lists:

- Ledra arcuatifrons Walker 1857 - Borneo, Peninsular Malaysia
- Ledra auditura Walker 1858 - Taiwan, Japan, China, Korea, Russia, Hong-Kong
- Ledra aurita (Linnaeus, 1758) - Europe
- Ledra bilobata Schumacher 1915 - Taiwan, Japan
- Ledra buschi Schmidt 1926 – western Indonesia
- Ledra cingalensis Distant - Sri Lanka
- Ledra concolor Walker, 1851 - Australia
- Ledra conicifrons Walker 1857 - Borneo, Singapore
- Ledra conifera Walker 1857 - Borneo, Singapore
- Ledra depravata Jacobi 1944 - China
- Ledra dilatata Walker 1851 - Indian subcontinent, Sri Lanka, Myanmar
- Ledra dilatifrons Walker 1857 - Borneo, Peninsular Malaysia
- Ledra dorsalis Walker 1851 - Indian subcontinent
- Ledra episcopalis Walker 1855
- Ledra fumata - China
- Ledra gibba Walker 1851 - Philippines
- Ledra gigantea Distant 1909 - Borneo
- Ledra hyalina Kuoh & Cai 1994 - China
- Ledra imitatrix Jacobi 1944
- Ledra intermedia Distant 1908
- Ledra kosempoensis Schumacher 1915
- Ledra laevis Walker 1851
- Ledra lineata Walker 1851
- Ledra longifrons Walker 1857
- Ledra muda Distant 1909
- Ledra mutica Fabricius 1803
- Ledra obtusifrons Walker 1857
- Ledra orientalis Ouchi 1938
- Ledra planifrons Walker 1857
- Ledra punctata Walker 1851
- Ledra quadricarina Walker 1858
- Ledra ranifrons Walker 1857
- Ledra reclinata Distant 1907
- Ledra rugosa Walker 1851
- Ledra serrulata Fabricius 1803
- Ledra solita (Walker)
- Ledra sternalis Jacobi 1944
- Ledra sublata Distant 1908
- Ledra truncatifrons Walker 1857
- Ledra tuberculifrons Walker 1857

Note: L. viridipennis Latreille 1811 is now placed as Zyzzogeton viridipennis (Latreille, 1811)

== Gallery ==
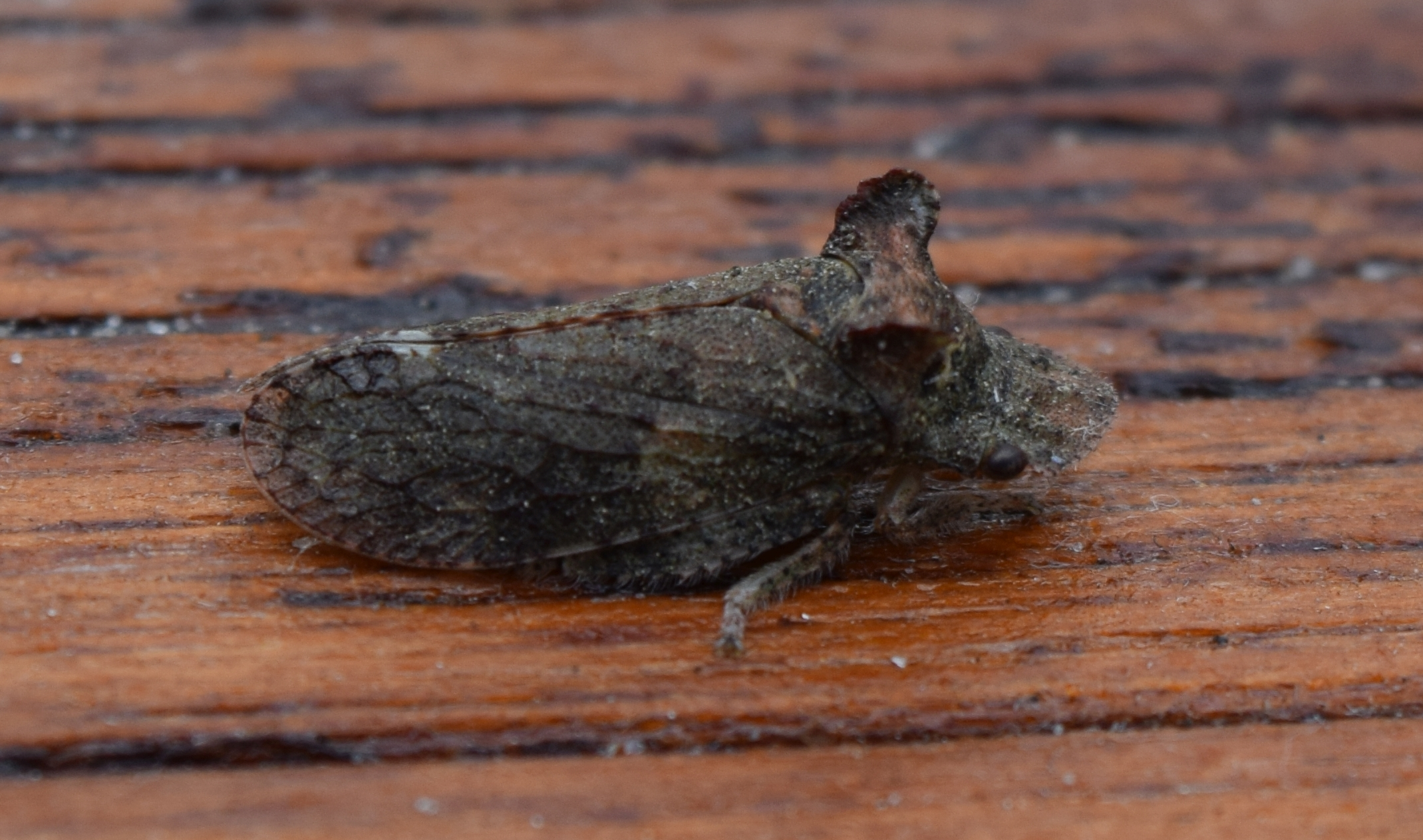
Ledra aurita

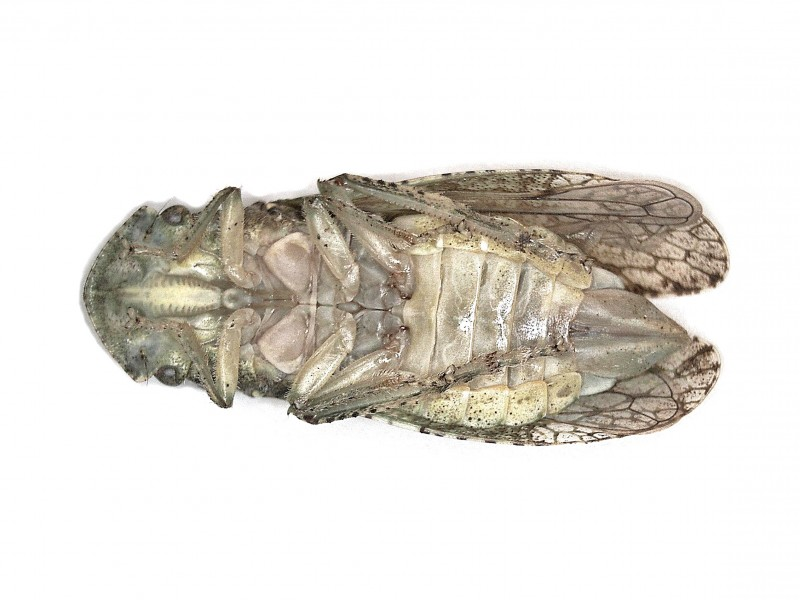
underside

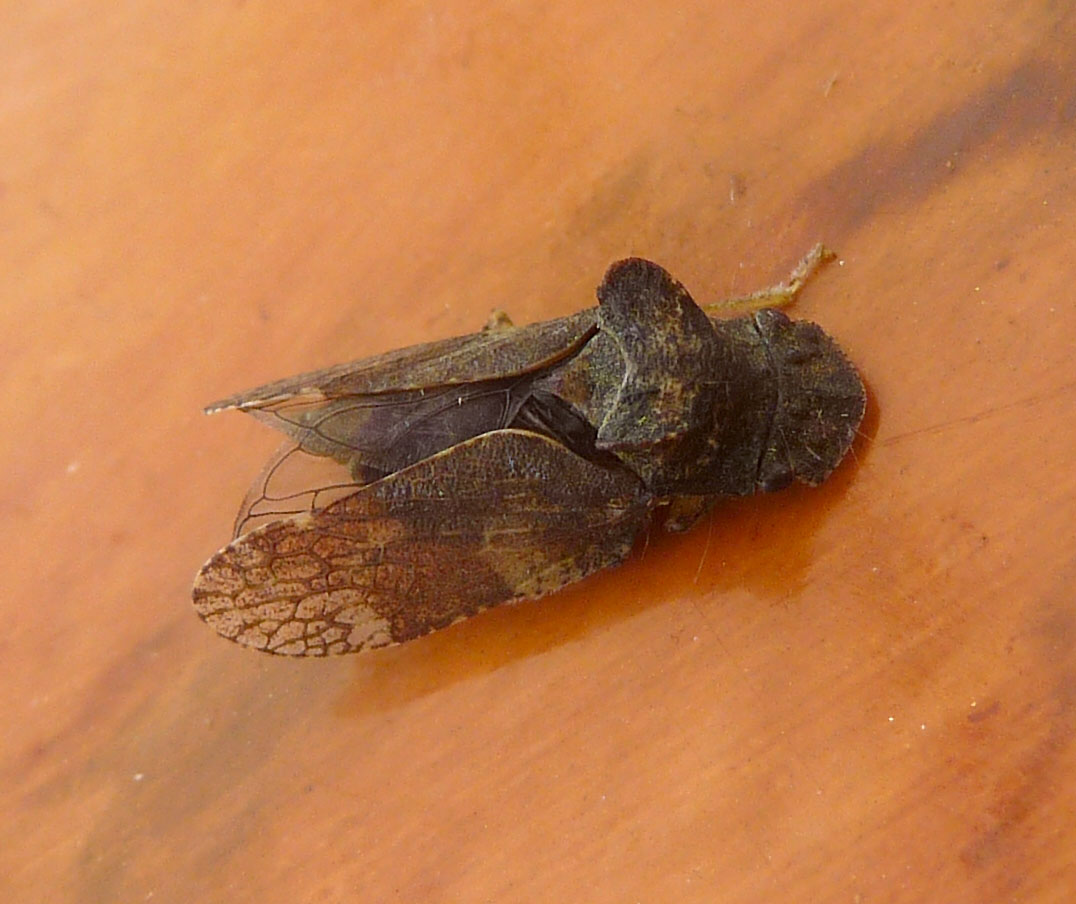

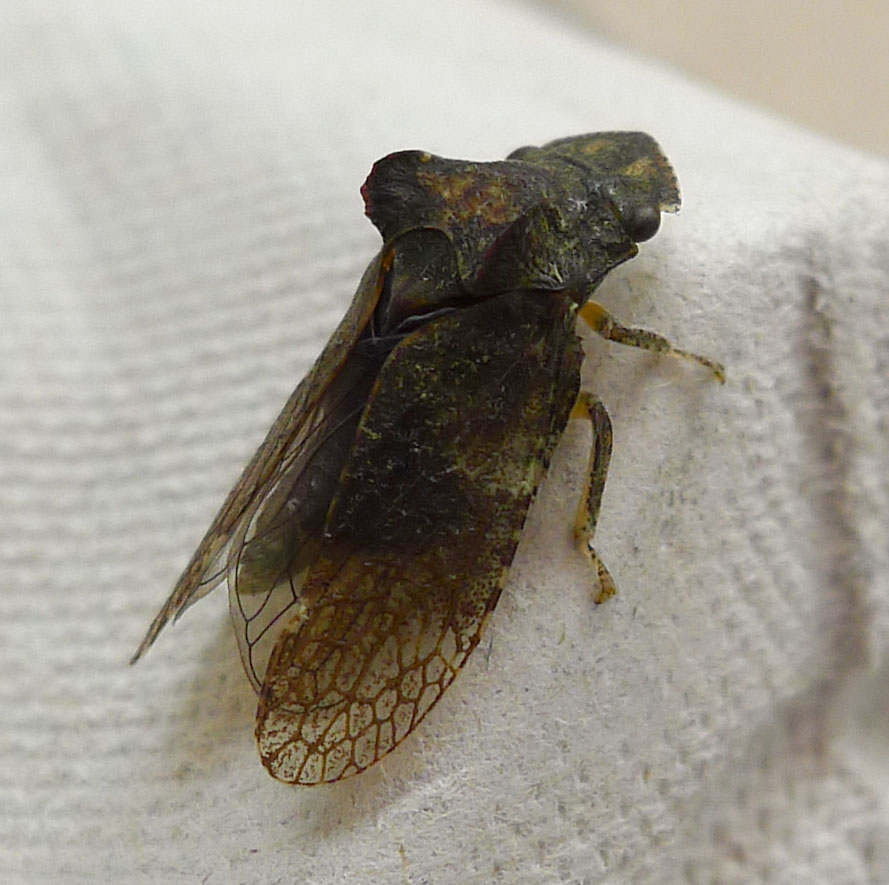

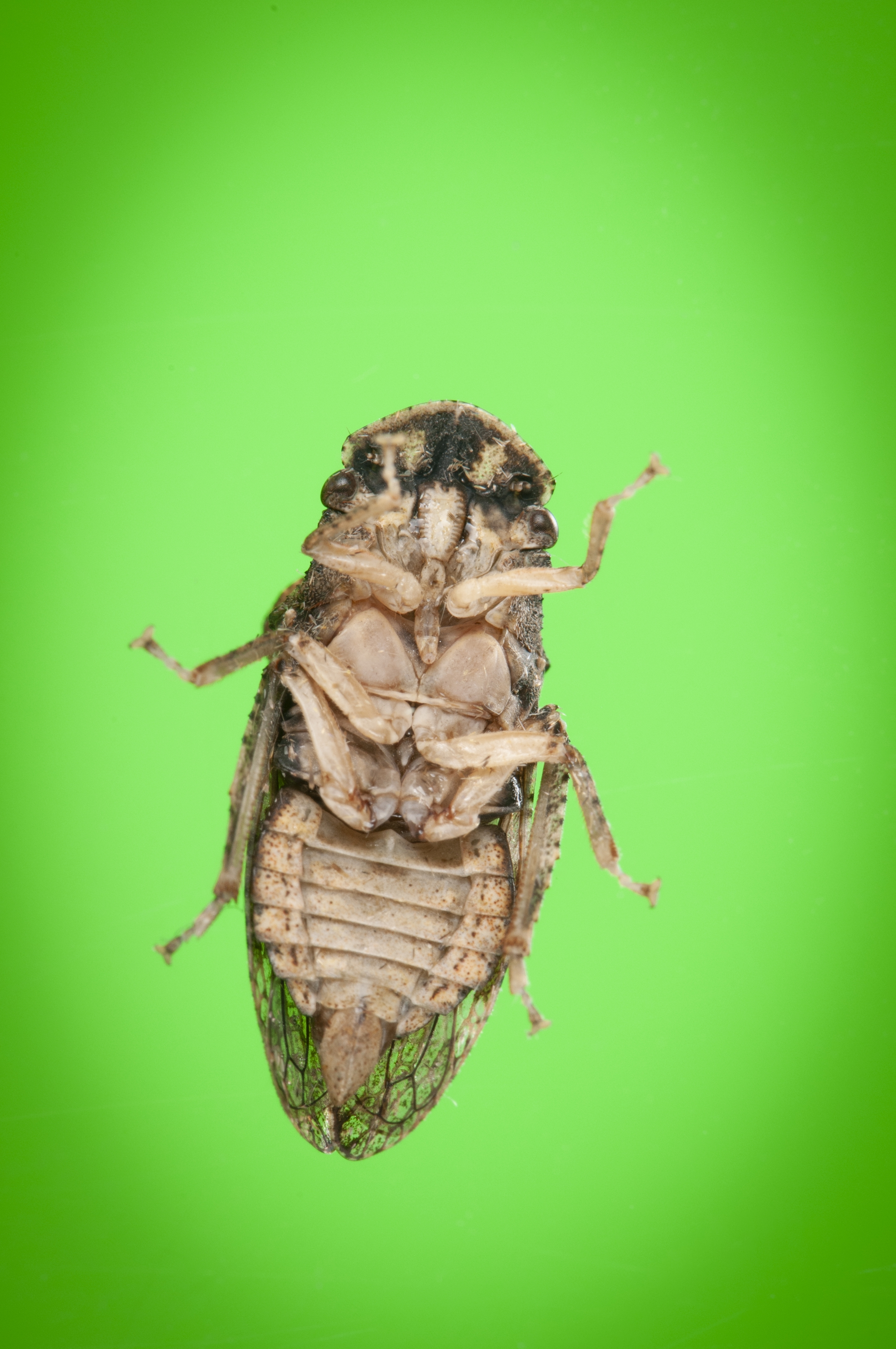
Ledra auditura (ventral)
