= Tituria (leafhopper) =

Scientific classification
- Kingdom: Animalia
- Phylum: Arthropoda
- Clade: Pancrustacea
- Class: Insecta
- Order: Hemiptera
- Suborder: Auchenorrhyncha
- Family: Cicadellidae
- Subfamily: Ledrinae
- Tribe: Ledrini
- Genus: Tituria; Stål, 1865

Synonyms
- Epiclinata Metcalf, 1952; Epiclines Amyot & Audinet-Serville, 1843

Genus of true bugs

External image
- Images at iNaturalist

Tituria is a genus of leaf-hoppers in the tribe Ledrini, erected by Carl Stål in 1865. Species have been recorded from Africa and in Asia: southern India, China, Indochina, Malesia through to New Guinea.

== Species ==
As of November 2026, the World Auchenorrhyncha Database includes:

1. Tituria acutangulata Distant, 1908
2. Tituria angulata (Matsumura, 1912)
3. Tituria antica (Walker, 1858)
4. Tituria assamensis Distant, 1908
5. Tituria borneensis Distant, 1907
6. Tituria chersonesia Distant, 1907
7. Tituria chinensis Distant, 1907
8. Tituria clypeata Cai, 1993
9. Tituria colorata Jacobi, 1944
10. Tituria cornuta Wang, Li & Dai, 2024
11. Tituria costalis Jacobi, 1944
12. Tituria crinita Cai, 1993
13. Tituria cuneata Distant, 1908
14. Tituria flavimacula Cai & Shen, 1998
15. Tituria forficula Linnavuori, 1972
16. Tituria fusca Cai & Li, 1995
17. Tituria fuscipennis Kato, 1929
18. Tituria hebes (Walker, 1858)
19. Tituria hyalina Cai & Kuoh, 1991
20. Tituria innotata Cai & Li, 1995
21. Tituria javanensis Distant, 1907
22. Tituria kaihuana Yang, 1995
23. Tituria laboulbenii (Signoret, 1858)
24. Tituria laticoronata Cai, 1993
25. Tituria lokandu Linnavuori, 1972
26. Tituria maculata Kuoh, 1992
27. Tituria nigricarinata Kuoh, 1992
28. Tituria nigrina (Cai & Kuoh, 1991)
29. Tituria nigrivena Cai, 1993
30. Tituria nigromarginata (Stål, 1865) - type species (by subsequent designation of genus Tituria Stål)
31. Tituria obliqua (Walker, 1857)
32. Tituria obtusa Kato, 1931
33. Tituria plagiata Kuoh, 1992
34. Tituria planata (Fabricius, 1794)
35. Tituria pyramidata Cai, 1993
36. Tituria recta Cai & Mo, 1992
37. Tituria sagittata Cai & Shen, 1999
38. Tituria sativa Cai & Shen, 1998
39. Tituria timorensis Distant, 1907
40. Tituria virescens Kuoh, 1988
41. Tituria viridula Linnavuori, 1972
