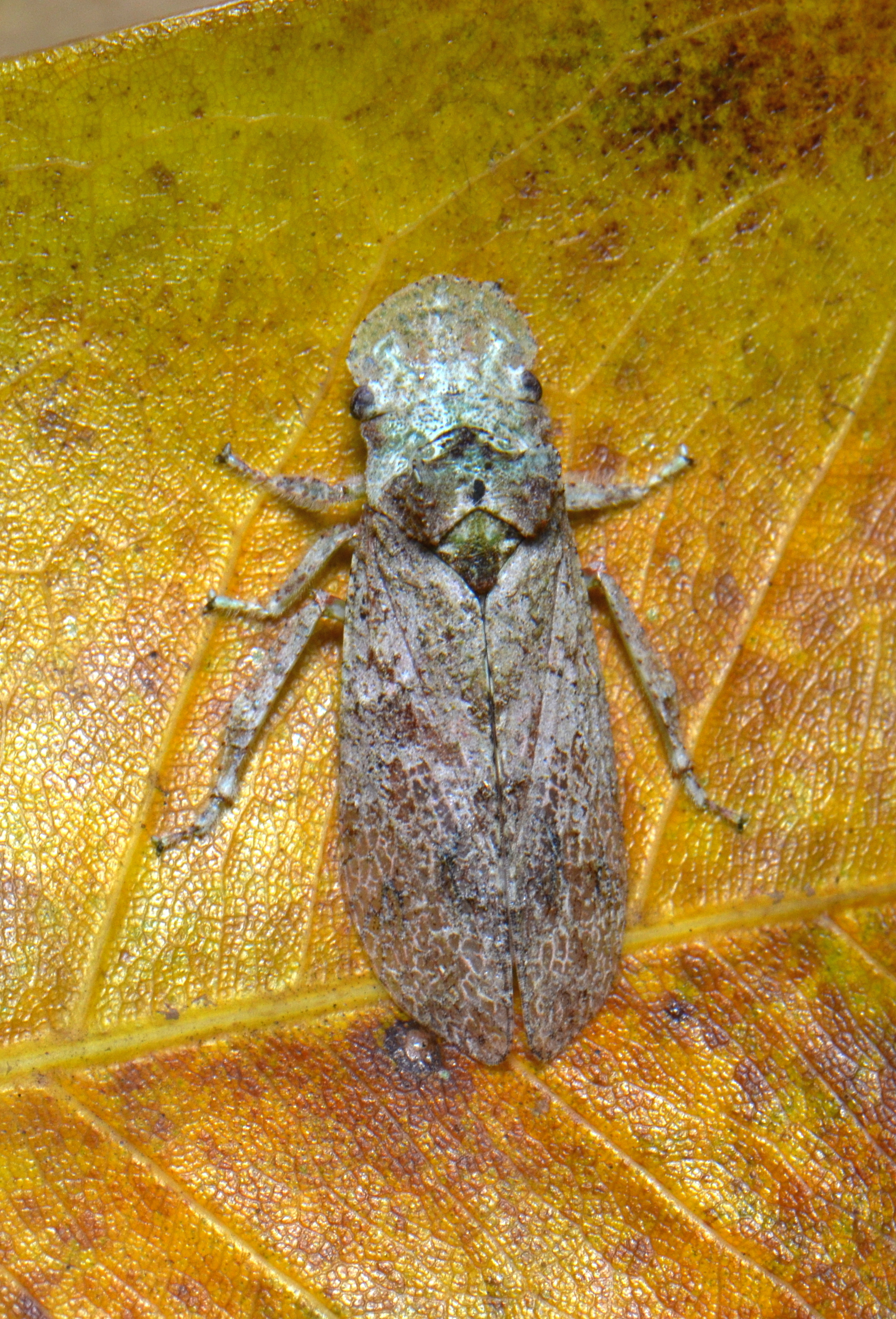
- Ledra sp., Russia

Scientific classification
- Kingdom: Animalia
- Phylum: Arthropoda
- Clade: Pancrustacea
- Class: Insecta
- Order: Hemiptera
- Suborder: Auchenorrhyncha
- Infraorder: Cicadomorpha
- Superfamily: Membracoidea
- Family: Cicadellidae
- Subfamily: Ledrinae (Kirschbaum, 1867)

= Ledrinae =

Subfamily of leafhoppers

Ledrinae is a relatively small subfamily within the very large and diverse leafhopper family Cicadellidae. Originally placed in its own family, the "Ledridae", it is based on the type genus Ledra.

== Description ==
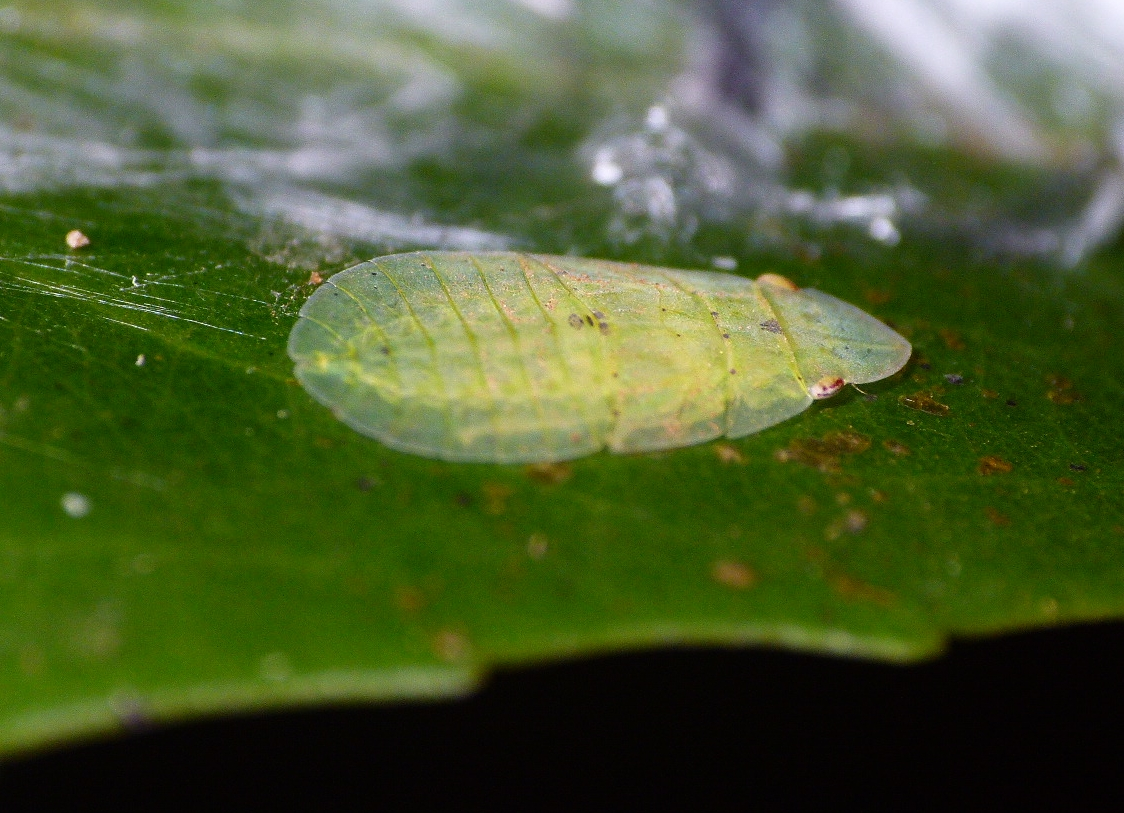
A nymph from southern India showing the typical flat form

The Ledrinae are mostly green or brown with a flattened body and tibiae. The ocelli are located near the crown and the forewings have a dense network of veins.

== Tribes and genera ==
The subfamily contains around 500 species which are divided into 5 to 7 tribes depending on the taxonomy followed. A 2009 revision treats the subfamily as having five tribes. The Afrorubrini are found only in southern Africa with 2 genera; the Hespenedrini has a single genus in Chile; Rubrini with a single genus in Australia; and two larger tribes that have a more widespread distribution, especially the Ledrini. Altogether there are more than 40 genera and around 14 others which are not well-placed.

Genera considered members of the subfamily Ledrinae are listed below; Biolib.cz currently lists seven tribes.

=== Afrorubrini ===
An African tribe, created by Jones in 2009 and consist of two genera:

- Afrorubria Linnavuori, 1972^{c g}
- Sichaea Stål, 1866

=== Ledrini ===
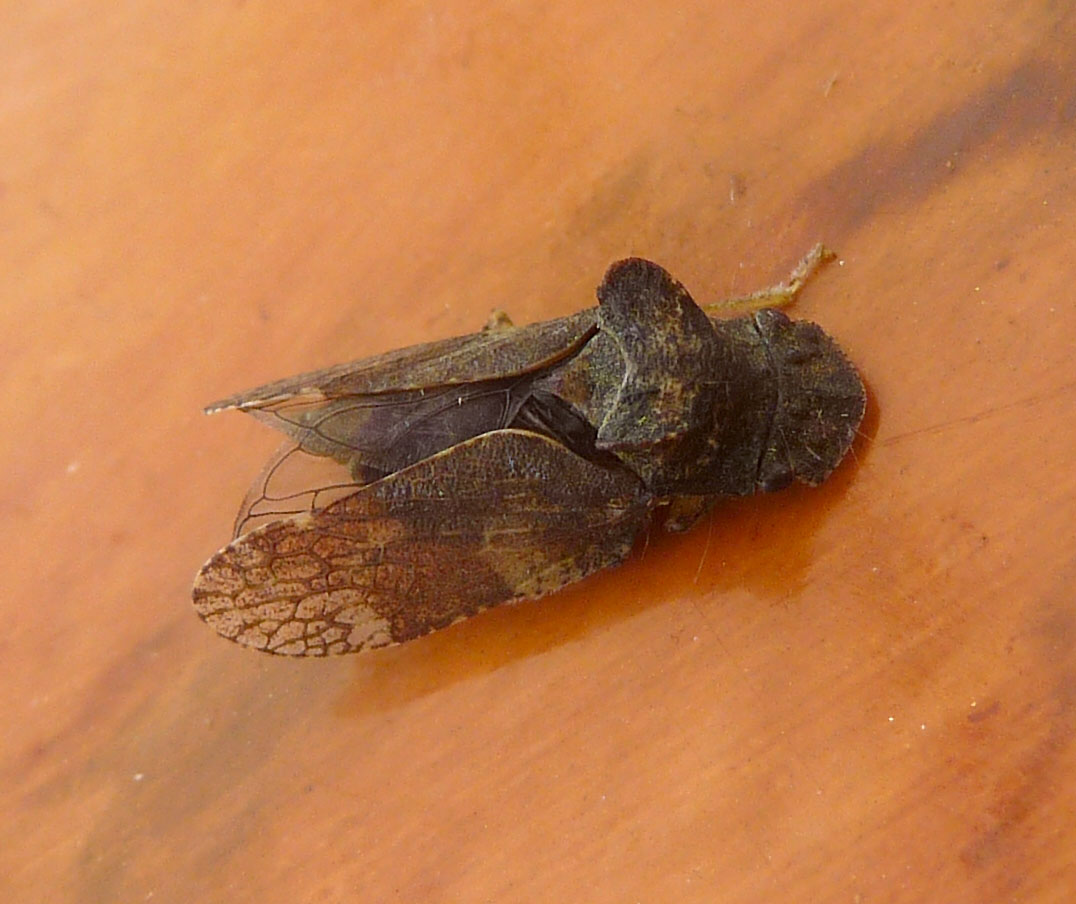
Ledra aurita

The largest tribe (including Petalocephalini), in number of genera, was originally erected by Fairmaire in 1855 and includes the following genera:

- Bascarrhinus Fowler, 1898^{c g}
- Beniledra Linnavuori, 1972^{c g}
- Betsileonas Kirkaldy, 1903^{c g}
- Camptelasmus Spinola, 1850
- Chatura Distant, 1908
- Cololedra Evans, 1969
- Confucius Distant, 1907
- Destinia Nast, 1952
- Destinoides Cai & He, 2000
- Dusuna Distant, 1907
- Eleazara Distant, 1908
- Eogypona Kirkaldy, 1901
- Epiclinata Metcalf, 1952
- Ezrana Distant, 1908
- Funkikonia Katô, 1931
- Hangklipia Linnavuori, 1972
- Hemipeltis Spinola, 1850
- Jukaruka Distant, 1907
- Latycephala McKamey, 2006
- Ledra Fabricius, 1803
- Ledracorrhis Evans, 1959
- Ledromorpha Stål, 1864
- Ledropsella Evans, 1966
- Ledropsis White, 1844
- Macrotrichia Zhang, Sun & Dai, 2009
- Midoria Katô, 1931
- Neotituria Kato, 1932
- Pachyledra Schumacher, 1912
- Parapetalocephala Katô, 1931
- Petalocephala Stål, 1854
- Petalocephaloides Kato, 1931
- Platyjassites† Hamilton, 1990
- Platyledra Evans, 1936
- Porcorhinus Goding, 1903
- Stenoledra Evans, 1954
- Thlasia Germar, 1836
- Titiella Bergroth, 1920
- Tituria Stål, 1865
- Turitia Schumacher, 1912
- Yelahanka Viraktamath, Webb & Yeshwanth, 2021

=== Monotypic tribes ===
- Hespenedra Kramer, 1966 (tribe Hespenedrini)
- Rubria Stål, 1865^{c g} (tribe Rubrini)

=== Stenocotini ===
- Anacotis Evans, 1937^{c g}
- Kyphocotis Kirkaldy, 1906^{c g}
- Kyphoctella Evans, 1966^{c g}
- Ledracotis Evans, 1937^{c g}
- Smicrocotis Kirkaldy, 1906^{c g}
- Stenocotis Stål, 1854^{c g}

=== Thymbrini ===
This tribe was erected by Evans in 1936; Biolib lists the following genera:

- Alseis Kirkaldy, 1907^{c g}
- Epipsychidion Kirkaldy, 1906
- Hackeriana Evans, 1937^{c g}
- Ledraprora Evans, 1937^{c g}
- Ledrella Evans, 1937^{c g}
- Macroceps Signoret, 1879^{c g}
- Microledrella Evans, 1969^{c g}
- Mitelloides Evans, 1939^{c g}
- Novothymbris Evans, 1941^{c g}
- Platyhynna Berg, 1884^{c g}
- Putoniessa Kirkaldy, 1907^{c g}
- Putoniessiella Evans, 1969^{c g}
- Rhotidoides Evans, 1937^{c g}
- Rhotidus Walker, 1862^{c g}
- Putoniessa Kirkaldy, 1907^{c g}
- Putoniessiella Evans, 1969^{c g}
- Rhotidoides Evans, 1937^{c g}
- Rhotidus Walker, 1862^{c g}
- Stenalsella Evans, 1966^{c g}
- Thymbrella Evans, 1969^{c g}
- Thymbris Kirkaldy, 1907^{c g}

=== Xerophloeini ===
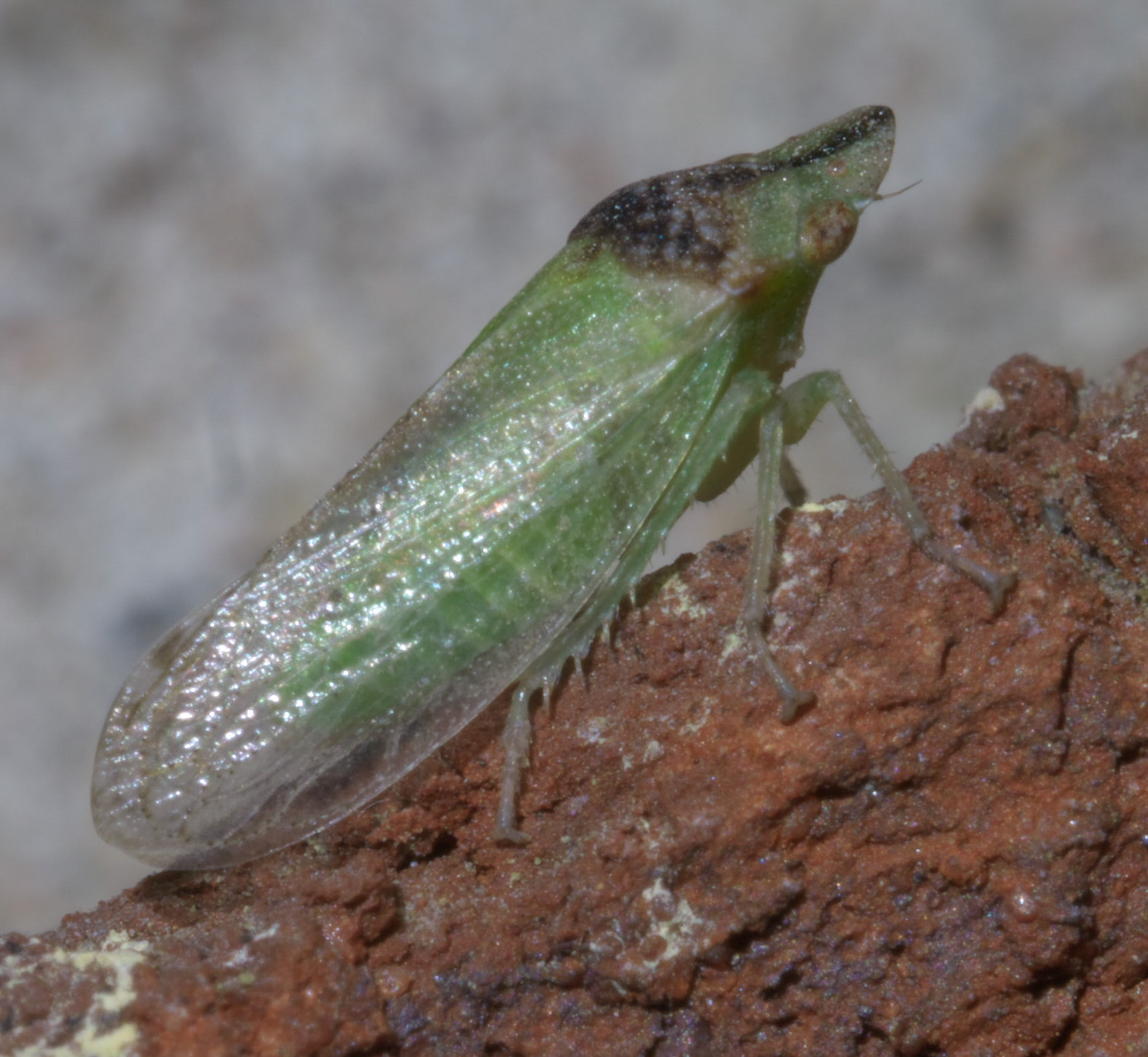
Xerophloea viridis

This tribe was erected by Oman in 1943; Biolib lists five genera:

- Pariacaca Szwedo, 2002^{c g}
- Piezauchenia Spinola, 1850^{c g}
- Proranus Spinola, 1850^{c g}
- Xedreota ^{c g}
- Xerophloea Germar, 1839^{c g b}

Data sources: i = ITIS, c = Catalogue of Life, g = GBIF, b = Bugguide.net

Incertae sedis

- †Cubicostissus Bourgoin & Nel, 2020
- Paulianiana - monotypic P. dracula Evans, 1954 endemic to Madagascar.

== Gallery ==
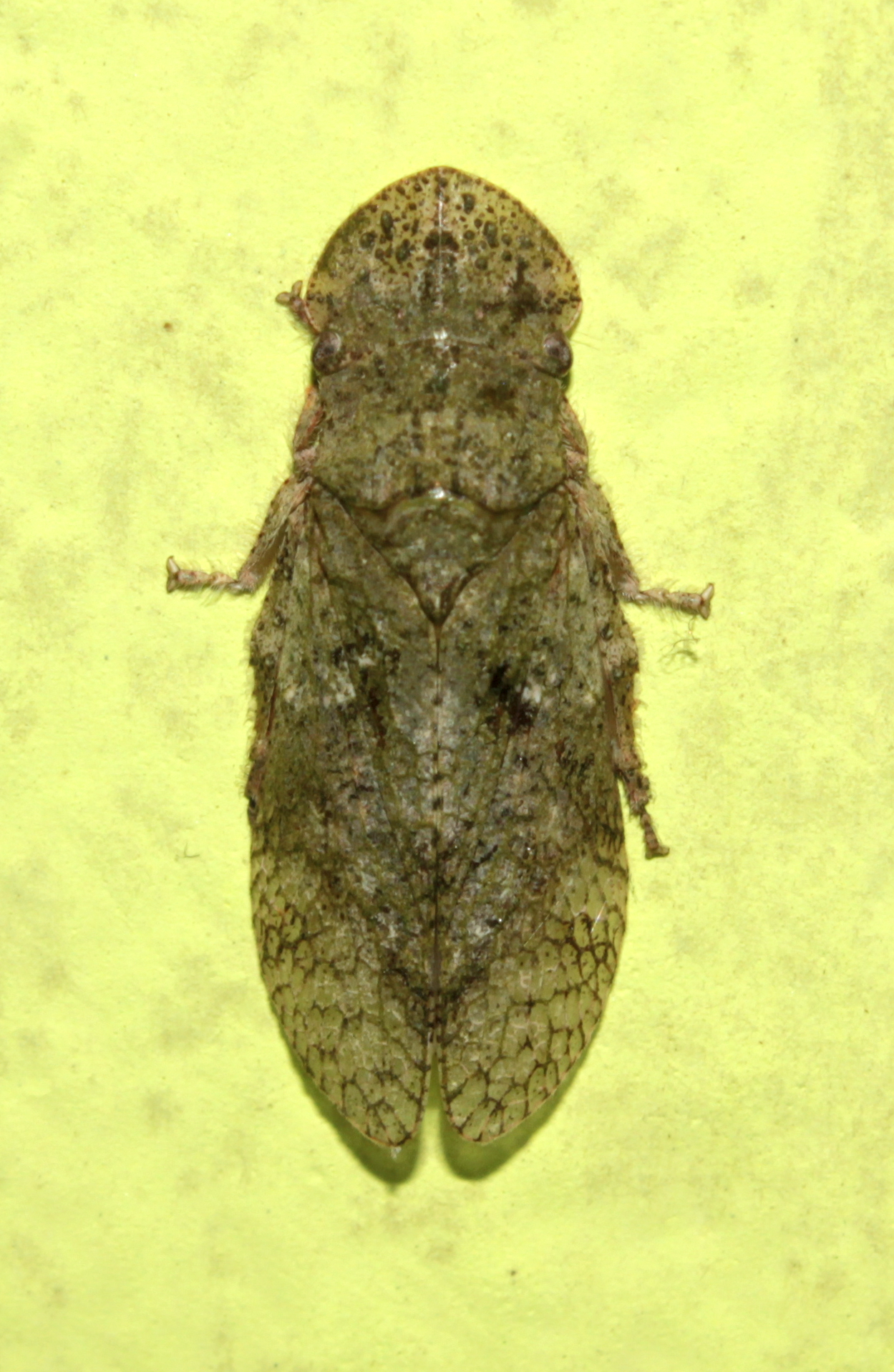

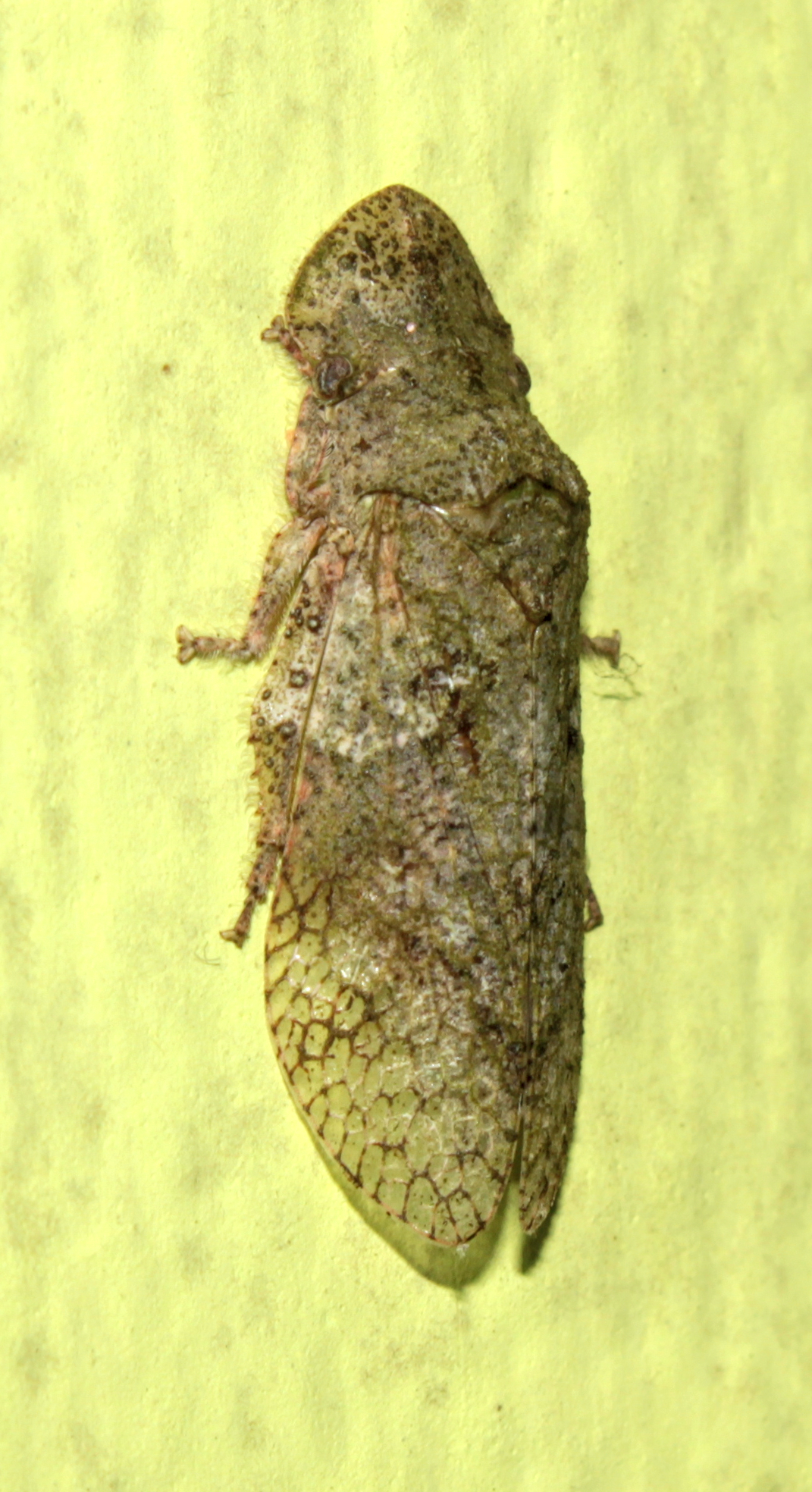
