= Petalocephala =

- Petalocephala sp. taken in South Africa

Scientific classification
- Kingdom: Animalia
- Phylum: Arthropoda
- Clade: Pancrustacea
- Class: Insecta
- Order: Hemiptera
- Suborder: Auchenorrhyncha
- Family: Cicadellidae
- Subfamily: Ledrinae
- Tribe: Ledrini
- Genus: Petalocephala; Stål, 1854

Synonyms
- Destinoides Cai & He, 2000; Pachyledra Schumacher, 1912; Peltocephala [sic] Stål, 1854 (and other orthographic variants)

Genus of true bugs

Petalocephala is a genus of leaf-hoppers in the tribe Ledrini, erected by Carl Stål in 1854. Species have been recorded from sub-Saharan Africa and Iran, subcontinental India, China, Indochina, Malesia through to New Guinea and Australia.

== Species ==
As of November 2026, the World Auchenorrhyncha Database includes:

1. Petalocephala adelungi (Melichar, 1902)
2. Petalocephala alata Evans, 1969
3. Petalocephala arcuata Cai & Kuoh, 1992
4. Petalocephala armata Evans, 1969
5. Petalocephala balehonnurensis Viraktamath, Webb & Yeshwanth, 2025
6. Petalocephala baluchestanica Dlabola, 1981
7. Petalocephala bazarakana Dlabola, 1957
8. Petalocephala bicolor Distant, 1908
9. Petalocephala bipunctata Melichar, 1914
10. Petalocephala bohemani Stål, 1854 - type species (by subsequent designation)
11. Petalocephala castanea Kato, 1931
12. Petalocephala cephalotes Distant, 1916
13. Petalocephala chlorocephala (Walker, 1851)
14. Petalocephala chlorophana Kuoh, 1984
15. Petalocephala circumvoluta Li, Zhang & Cao, 2026
16. Petalocephala concolor (Walker, 1851)
17. Petalocephala confusa Distant, 1908
18. Petalocephala conica (Walker, 1851)
19. Petalocephala conspersa Kuoh, 1992
20. Petalocephala conspicua Distant, 1907
21. Petalocephala cultellifera (Walker, 1857)
22. Petalocephala declivis Walker, 1869
23. Petalocephala duodiana Kuoh, 1981
24. Petalocephala duplicata Li, Zhang & Cao, 2026
25. Petalocephala dweepa Rajgopal, 2026
26. Petalocephala engelhardti Kusnezov, 1931
27. Petalocephala enigmoides Evans, 1969
28. Petalocephala eurglobata Cai & He, 1998
29. Petalocephala flavomarginata Cai & Huang, 1999
30. Petalocephala formosana (Matsumura, 1912)
31. Petalocephala fuscomarginata Cai & Kuoh, 1992
32. Petalocephala fusiformis (Walker, 1851)
33. Petalocephala glauca (Melichar, 1903)
34. Petalocephala gonzalezi Lindberg, 1954
35. Petalocephala grandiosa Dlabola, 1957
36. Petalocephala hainanensis (Huang & Zhang, 2019)
37. Petalocephala hearsayi Distant, 1908
38. Petalocephala horishana (Matsumura, 1912)
39. Petalocephala insignis Distant, 1908
40. Petalocephala ishanya Rajgopal, 2026
41. Petalocephala ixion Linnavuori, 1972
42. Petalocephala kamerunensis (Schumacher, 1912)
43. Petalocephala kempi Singh-Pruthi, 1936
44. Petalocephala koshunensis Schumacher, 1915
45. Petalocephala kuankuoensis Li & Li, 2011
46. Petalocephala latifrons (Walker, 1851)
47. Petalocephala limbata Evans, 1969
48. Petalocephala manchurica Kato, 1932
49. Petalocephala nauniensis Viraktamath, Webb & Yeshwanth, 2025
50. Petalocephala nigrella Evans, 1969
51. Petalocephala nigrilinea (Walker, 1857)
52. Petalocephala nigrinaso Wang, Dietrich & Dai, 2024
53. Petalocephala obtusa Kuoh, 1984
54. Petalocephala ochracea Cai & Kuoh, 1992
55. Petalocephala perakensis Distant, 1912
56. Petalocephala perductalis (Kirby, 1891)
57. Petalocephala philippina Stål, 1870
58. Petalocephala pilka Evans, 1969
59. Petalocephala planata Evans, 1969
60. Petalocephala porrigens Walker, 1869
61. Petalocephala potanini Melichar, 1902
62. Petalocephala pullata Evans, 1969
63. Petalocephala pulsata Evans, 1969
64. Petalocephala punctatissima Stål, 1870
65. Petalocephala quadrimaculata (Matsumura, 1912)
66. Petalocephala raniceps Jacobi, 1912
67. Petalocephala remota (Melichar, 1903)
68. Petalocephala rotunda Li, Zhang & Cao, 2026
69. Petalocephala rubromarginata Kato, 1931
70. Petalocephala rubromarginella Kuoh, 1984
71. Petalocephala rufa Cen & Cai, 2000
72. Petalocephala rufomarginata Kuoh, 1984
73. Petalocephala sahyadrica Viraktamath, Webb & Yeshwanth, 2025
74. Petalocephala scutellaris Linnavuori, 1972
75. Petalocephala skoba Evans, 1969
76. Petalocephala spicata Evans, 1969
77. Petalocephala stellata Evans, 1969
78. Petalocephala subacta Walker, 1869
79. Petalocephala subaquila Distant, 1908
80. Petalocephala taihorensis Schumacher, 1915
81. Petalocephala taikosana Kato, 1931
82. Petalocephala tenuifrons (Walker, 1857)
83. Petalocephala testacea Cai & Kuoh, 1991
84. Petalocephala trispicula Evans, 1969
85. Petalocephala turgida Linnavuori, 1972
86. Petalocephala umbrosa Distant, 1908
87. Petalocephala unicolor Cen & Cai, 2000
88. Petalocephala uniformis Distant, 1908
89. Petalocephala viridis Cai & He, 1997
90. Petalocephala vittata (Matsumura, 1912)
91. Petalocephala wahlbergi Stål, 1854
