= Marcus Yang =

Entrepreneur and investor

- Born: Republic of China (Taiwan)
- Education: University of California, Los Angeles (BS); University of California, Berkeley (MS)
- Occupations: President at Amaryllo Inc. Member at Band of Angels (investors); Advisor at SUM.vc

Chao-Tung Marcus Yang (Chinese: 楊朝棟) is a Taiwanese entrepreneur and investor. He is a member of the Band of Angels, the first high technology specific angel investment group in the United States. He and Mr. Garrett Gilbertson started Band of Angles Los Angeles Special Interest Group in early 2019. The Band reviews more than 1,000 deals per year. In 2021 the Band invested in 24 startups. He also serves as an advisor at Startup Mavericks Ventures.

== Life and career ==
Yang was educated at the University of California, Los Angeles (UCLA), majoring in Electrical Engineering and received MSEE from UC Berkeley majoring in wireless communication IC design. He was President and CEO at MStar Semiconductor USA. MStar is world’s number-one TV and LCD monitor IC design company with 4,000 employees worldwide. MStar went public (TSE: 3697) and valued at $6B in Taiwan in 2010. Company later merged with its nemesis MediaTek forming world’s top 3 IC design company in 2012.

He founded KeyStone Semiconductor in 2009 and led the company engineering teams to develop the first single-chip FM/DAB/DAB+ receiver IC published at 2010 ESSCIRC. Mr. Yang founded Amaryllo Inc. in 2012 and introduced world’s first Skype certified IP cameras with military grade 256-bit encryption at Internationale Funkausstellung Berlin (IFA) 2013. He invented and filed patents on the embedded auto-tracking security camera employing computer vision. The first standalone auto-tracking security cameras were introduced at Consumer Electronics Show (CES) and won the best innovation award at CES 2015 under embedded technology category. Amaryllo won another CES Best Innovation Award under Smart Cities category in 2018 CES.

== Honors ==
Mr. Yang was the 2017 Taiwan Most Outstanding Entrepreneur Award winner and served as Taiwan's National Data Security Review Committee in 2017. He had been honored by Taiwan Presidents 6 times from 2015 to 2020. He enjoys technology innovation and has filed over 100 patents worldwide.
