= Leta Andrews =

American basketball coach

Leta Mae Rains Andrews
Personal information
- Born: July 2, 1937 (age 89) Granbury, Texas, U.S.

Career information
- High school: Granbury High School
- College: Weatherford College; Texas Wesleyan University
- Coaching career: 1962–2014

Career history

Coaching
- 1962-1965: Tolar High School
- 1965-1970: Gustine High School
- 1970-1976: Comanche High School
- 1976-1980: Granbury High School
- 1980-1992: Calallen High School
- 1992-2014: Granbury High School

Career highlights
- Texas State Championship (1990); Walt Disney National Teacher of the Year (1993); High School Basketball Hall of Fame (1995); Texas Sports Hall of Fame (2007); NHSCA National High School Coach of the Year (2007); Morgan Wootten Lifetime Achievement Award (2008); 5× Naismith Memorial Hall of Fame finalist (2015, 2016, 2019, 2021, 2022)

Career coaching record
- UIL: 1,416–355 (.800)
- Women's Basketball Hall of Fame

Leta Mae Rains Andrews (born July 2, 1937) is a retired American high school basketball coach who recorded 1,416 wins during her high school coaching career.

== Biography ==
Andrews was born near Granbury and graduated from Granbury High School in 1955. She grew up with brothers Walter and George, and sister Shirley who also played and later coached girls basketball.

Clyde Rains held Shirley back for one year in school so she and Leta could play basketball together for four years in high school. Together, the Rains sisters led Granbury to the state championship game in 1954 and 1955, losing both years to Dimmitt.

== Coaching career ==
Andrews coached high school basketball for fifty-two years at five high schools in Texas from 1962 to 2014, leading those teams to sixteen state Final Four appearances, and a state championship in 1990. Andrews served as Head coach of the McDonald's All-American Game West team in 2004, and the Gatorade All-America team in 2009. In 2007, she was named the NHSCA National High School Coach of the Year and received the Morgan Wootten Lifetime Achievement Award. She was inducted into the High School Basketball Hall of Fame in 1995, the Women's Basketball Hall of Fame in 2010, and the Texas Sports Hall of Fame in 2012. She is a three-time finalist for induction into the Naismith Memorial Basketball Hall of Fame (2015, 2016, 2019).

With her 1,218th win on December 9, 2005, Andrews became the nation's winningest high school girls’ coach, passing Bradley Central High School (Cleveland, Tennessee) coach Jim Smiddy. She became the winningest high school basketball coach (boys or girls) on December 7, 2010, with 1,334 wins, passing retired Dunbar High School coach Robert Hughes Sr.

== Personal life ==
Andrews was married to David Andrews (March 6, 1937 – March 28, 2018) for 62 years. She and David raised three daughters who were each Texas All-State high school basketball players, all of whom played college basketball for Hall of Fame coach Jody Conradt at the University of Texas. Daughter Linda Andrews Waggoner is a retired high school girls basketball coach who is also a member of the Texas High School Basketball Hall of Fame (1999), and the University of Texas Sports Hall of Fame (2003).

== Popular culture ==
Narrated by NBA Basketball Hall of Famer Bill Walton, It's All in the Game: The Leta Andrews Story is a documentary film that tells the story of Andrews's upbringing on the family farm outside of Granbury.
