= PlayStation 4 =

Home video game console by Sony

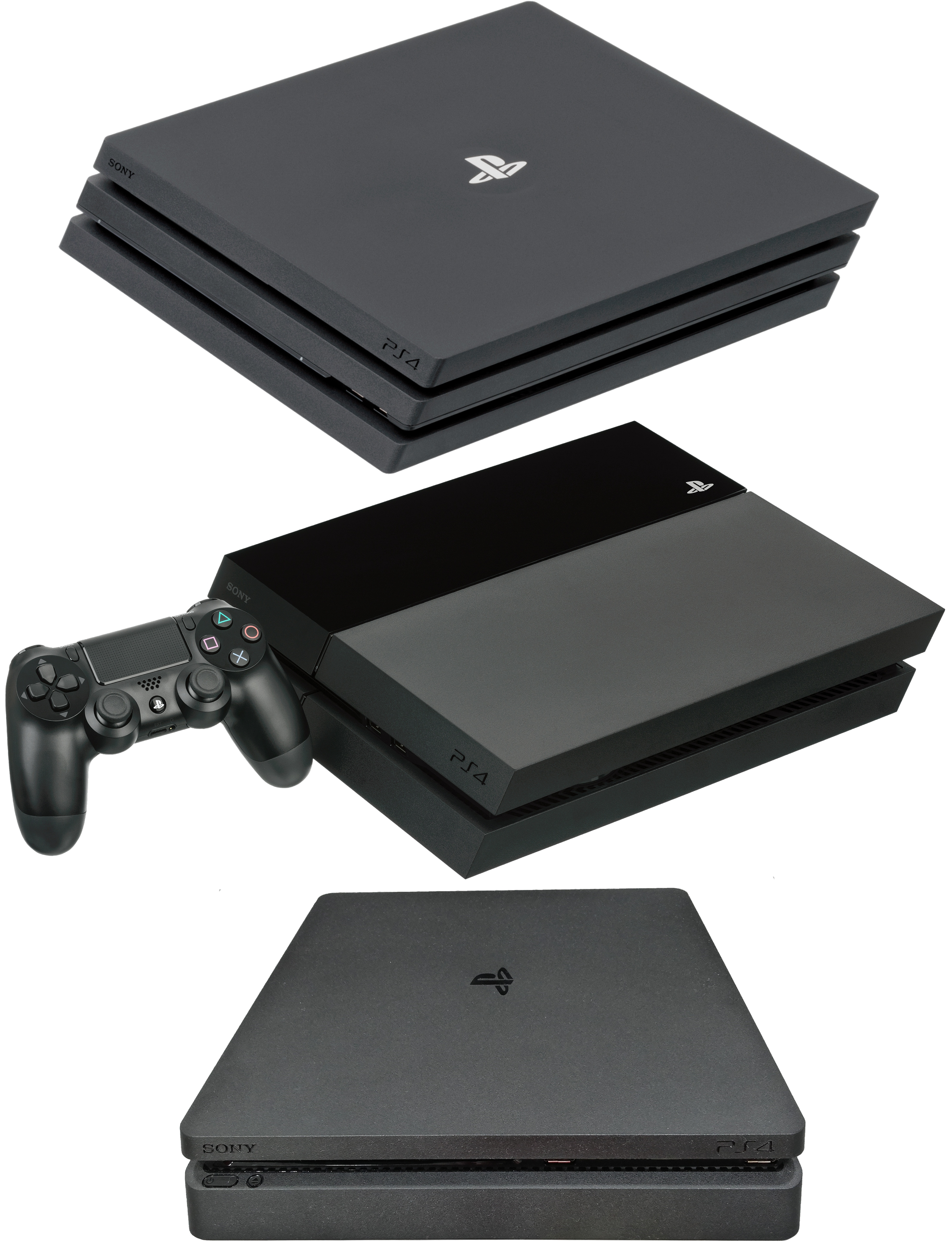
- Top: PlayStation 4 Pro (2016); Center: Original PlayStation 4 (2013); Bottom: PlayStation 4 Slim (2016)
- Also known as: PS4
- Developer: Sony Interactive Entertainment
- Manufacturer: Sony Electronics, Foxconn
- Product family: PlayStation
- Type: Home video game console
- Generation: Eighth
- Released: NA: November 15, 2013; PAL: November 29, 2013; JP: February 22, 2014
- Introductory price: ¥39,980 (equivalent to ¥45,460 in 2024); US$399.99 (equivalent to $550 in 2025); €399.99 (equivalent to €500 in 2023)
- Discontinued: JP: March 28, 2024; (Note: All models except the 500 GB Slim model were discontinued on January 5, 2021.)
- Units shipped: 117 million (As of March 31, 2022)
- Media: Blu-ray; Blu-ray 3D; DVD; Digital distribution
- Operating system: PlayStation 4 system software
- System on a chip: AMD APU
- CPU: AMD Jaguar, 8-core @ 1.6 GHz (2.13 GHz on PS4 Pro); Secondary low power processor (for background tasks)
- Memory: All models: 8 GB GDDR5 RAM; PS4 & Slim: 256 MB DDR3 RAM (for background tasks); Pro: 1 GB DDR3 RAM (for background tasks)
- Storage: 500 GB, 1 TB or 2 TB HDD
- Display: PS4 & Slim: 480p, 720p, 1080i, 1080p via HDMI 2.0a; Pro: 480p, 720p, 1080i, 1080p 4K UHD via HDMI 2.0b
- Graphics: PS4 & Slim: AMD GCN with 18 CUs @ 800 MHz (1.84 TFLOPS); Pro: AMD GCN with 36 CUs @ 911 MHz (4.2 TFLOPS)
- Controller input: DualShock 4, PlayStation Move, PlayStation Vita
- Camera: PlayStation Camera
- Connectivity: All models: HDMI, Gigabit Ethernet; PS4: Wi-Fi (802.11n), Bluetooth 2.1, USB 3.0; Slim & Pro: Wi-Fi (802.11ac), Bluetooth 4.0, USB 3.1
- Online services: PlayStation Network; PlayStation Plus
- Dimensions: PS4: 2.09 × 12 × 10.8 in (53 × 305 × 274 mm); Slim: 1.54 × 11.3 × 10.4 in (39 × 287 × 264 mm); Pro: 2.17 × 12.9 × 11.6 in (55 × 328 × 295 mm)
- Weight: PS4 (1st gen): 2.8 kg (6.2 lbs); PS4 (2nd gen): 2.5 kg (5.5 lbs); Slim: 2.1 kg (4.6 lbs); Pro: 3.3 kg (7.3 lbs)
- Best-selling game: Grand Theft Auto V (24.66 million) (list)
- Predecessor: PlayStation 3
- Successor: PlayStation 5
- Website: playstation.com/ps4/

The PlayStation 4 (PS4) is a home video game console developed by Sony Interactive Entertainment. Announced as the successor to the PlayStation 3 in February 2013, it was launched on November 15, 2013, in North America, November 29, 2013, in Europe, South America, and Australia, and on February 22, 2014, in Japan. A console of the eighth generation, it competed with Microsoft's Xbox One and Nintendo's Wii U and Switch.

Moving away from the more complex Cell microarchitecture of its predecessor, the console features an APU from AMD built upon the x86-64 architecture, which can theoretically peak at 1.84 teraflops; AMD stated that it was the "most powerful" APU it had developed to date. The PlayStation 4 places an increased emphasis on social interaction and integration with other devices and services, including the ability to play games off-console on PlayStation Vita and other supported devices ("Remote Play"), the ability to stream gameplay online or to friends, with them controlling gameplay remotely ("Share Play"). The console's controller was also redesigned and improved over the PlayStation 3, with updated buttons and analog sticks, and an integrated touchpad among other changes. The console also supports HDR10 high-dynamic-range video and playback of 4K resolution multimedia.

The PlayStation 4 was released to critical acclaim, with critics praising Sony for acknowledging its consumers' needs, embracing independent game development, and for not imposing the restrictive digital rights management schemes like those originally announced by Microsoft for the Xbox One. Critics and third-party studios, before its launch, also praised the capabilities of the PlayStation 4 in comparison to its competitors. Heightened demand also helped Sony top global console sales. In September 2016, the console was refreshed with a new, smaller revision, popularly referred to as the "Slim" model, as well as a high-end version called the PlayStation 4 Pro, which features an upgraded GPU and a higher CPU clock rate to support enhanced performance and 4K resolution in supported games. By October 2019, PS4 had become the second best-selling PlayStation console of all time, behind the PlayStation 2. Its successor, the PlayStation 5, was released in November 2020.

== History ==
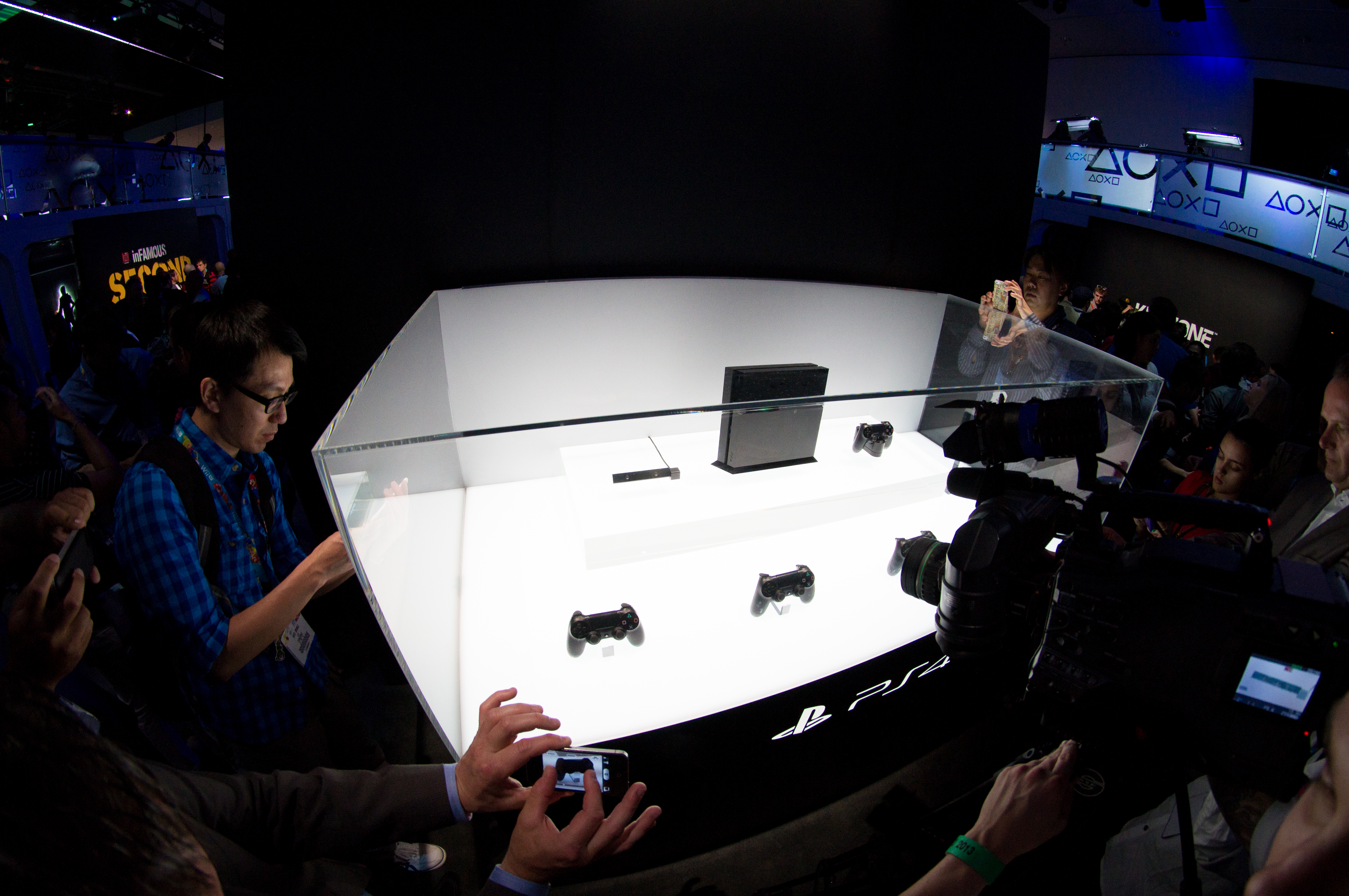
PlayStation 4 at E3 2013

According to lead architect Mark Cerny, the development of Sony's fourth video game console began as early as 2008.

Less than two years earlier, the PlayStation 3 had been launched after months of delays due to issues with production. The delay placed Sony almost a year behind Microsoft's Xbox 360, which was already approaching unit sales of 10 million by the time the PS3 launched. Sony Computer Entertainment Europe CEO Jim Ryan said Sony wanted to avoid repeating the same mistake with PS3's successor.

In designing the system, Sony worked with software developer Bungie, who offered their input on the controller and how to make it better for shooting games. In 2012, Sony began shipping development kits to game developers, consisting of a modified PC running the AMD Accelerated Processing Unit chipset. These development kits were known as "Orbis".

In early 2013, Sony announced that an event known as PlayStation Meeting 2013 would be held in New York City, U.S., on February 20, 2013, to cover the "future of PlayStation". Sony officially announced the PlayStation 4 at the event. It revealed details about the console's hardware and discussed some of the new features it would introduce. Sony also showed off real-time footage of games in development, as well as some technical demonstrations. The design of the console was unveiled in June at E3 2013, and the initial recommended retail prices of $399 (NA), €399 (Europe), and £349 (UK) given. Sony took advantage of problems that Microsoft had been having with their positioning of their newly announced Xbox One, which included its higher price point ($499 in North America), as well as strict regulations on how users could share game media. Besides its lower price point, Sony focused on the ease one would have in sharing media with the PS4.

The company revealed release dates for North America, Central America, South America, Europe, and Australia, as well as final pieces of information, at a Gamescom press event in Cologne, Germany, on August 20, 2013. The console was released on November 15, 2013, in the United States and Canada, followed by further releases on November 29, 2013. By the end of 2013, the PS4 was launched in more European, Asian and South American countries. The PS4 was released in Japan at ¥39,980 on February 22, 2014.

Sony finalized a deal with the Chinese government in May 2014 to sell its products in mainland China, and the PS4 was the first product to be released. Kazuo Hirai, chief executive officer of Sony, said in May: "The Chinese market, just given the size of it, is obviously potentially a very large market for video game products ... I think that we will be able to replicate the kind of success we have had with PS4 in other parts of the world in China."

In September 2015, Sony reduced the price of the PS4 in Japan to ¥34,980, with similar price drops in other Southeast Asian markets. The first official sub-£300 PS4 bundle was the £299.99 "Uncharted Nathan Drake Collection 500GB", and was released in the UK on October 9, 2015; a 1 TB £329.99 version was offered at the same time. On October 9, 2015, the first official price cut of the PS4 in North America was announced: a reduction of $50 to $349.99 (US) and by $20 to $429.99 (Canada). An official price cut in Europe followed in late October 2015, reduced to €349.99/£299.99.

On June 10, 2016, Sony confirmed that a hardware revision of the PlayStation 4, rumored to be codenamed "Neo", was under development. The new revision was revealed to be a higher-end model meant to support gameplay in 4K. This new model was sold alongside the existing model, and all existing software was compatible between the two models. Layden stated that Sony has no plans to "bifurcate the market", only that gamers playing on the Neo will "have the same experience, but one will be delivered at a higher resolution, with an enhanced graphical experience, but everything else is going to be exactly as you'd expect". The high-end console was publicly revealed on September 7, 2016, as PlayStation 4 Pro. At the same time, Sony unveiled an updated version of the original PS4 model with a smaller form factor.

In May 2018, during a presentation to investors, Sony Interactive Entertainment CEO John Kodera stated that the PlayStation 4 was heading into the end of its lifecycle and that the company was anticipating decreasing year-over-year hardware sales. He explained that Sony would be countering the expected decline by focusing on "strengthen[ing] user engagement" including continued investments into new first-party games and other online services for PS4. "We will use the next three years to prepare the next step, to crouch down so that we can jump higher in the future," Kodera added in an interview with the press the following day.

Following the launch of the PlayStation 5 in November 2020, Sony discontinued production in Japan of all but the 500 GB Slim model of the PlayStation 4 on January 5, 2021, with the standard PS4 and PS4 Pro still being produced for western markets. According to a report from Bloomberg News in January 2022, Sony had been poised to discontinue the PlayStation 4 at the end of 2021 in favor of the PlayStation 5, but due to a global chip shortage that lasted from 2020 to 2023, this made it difficult for Sony to keep up with PlayStation 5 demand. Instead, the company planned to continue PlayStation 4 production; besides helping to offset the PlayStation 5 shortage, this production method would help assure deals with its component providers for the PlayStation 5.

== Hardware ==
The technology in the PlayStation 4 is similar to the hardware found in modern personal computers. This familiarity is designed to make it easier and less expensive for game studios to develop games for the PS4.

=== Technical specifications ===
"[We] have not built an APU quite like that for anyone else in the market. It is by far the most powerful APU we have built to date". (February 2013)

— John Taylor, AMD

The PlayStation 4 uses an Accelerated Processing Unit (APU) developed by AMD in cooperation with Sony. It combines a central processing unit (CPU) and graphics processing unit (GPU), as well as other components such as a memory controller and video decoder. The CPU consists of two 28 nm quad-core Jaguar modules totaling 8 64-bit x86-64 cores, 7 of which are available for game developers to use. The GPU consists of 18 compute units to produce a theoretical peak performance of 1.84 TFLOPS. The system's GDDR5 memory is capable of running at a maximum clock frequency of 2.75 GHz (5500 MT/s) and has a maximum memory bandwidth of 176 GB/s. The console contains 8 GB of GDDR5 memory, 16 times the amount of RAM found in the PS3 and is expected to give the console considerable longevity. It also includes secondary custom chips that handle tasks associated with downloading, uploading, and social gameplay. These tasks can be handled in the background during gameplay or while the system is in sleep mode. The console also contains an audio module, which can support in-game chat as well as "a very large number" of audio streams for use in-game. All PlayStation 4 models support high dynamic range (HDR) color profiles.

Its read-only optical drive is capable of reading Blu-ray Discs at speeds of up to three times that of its predecessor. The console features a hardware on-the-fly zlib decompression module. The original PS4 model supports up to 1080p and 1080i video standards, while the Pro model supports 4K resolution. The console includes a 500 gigabyte hard drive for additional storage, which can be upgraded by the user. System Software 4.50, which was released on March 9, 2017, enabled the use of external USB hard drives up to 8 TB for additional storage.

The PlayStation 4 features Wi-Fi and Ethernet connectivity, Bluetooth, and two USB 3.0 ports. An auxiliary port is also included for connection to the PlayStation Camera, a motion detection digital camera device first introduced on the PS3. A mono headset, which can be plugged into the DualShock 4, is bundled with the system. Audio/video output options include HDMI TV and optical S/PDIF audio. The console does not have an analog audio/video output.

The PS4 features a "Rest mode" feature. This places the console in a low-power state while allowing users to immediately resume their game or app once the console is awoken. The console also is able to download content such as game and OS updates while it is in this state.

=== Controllers ===
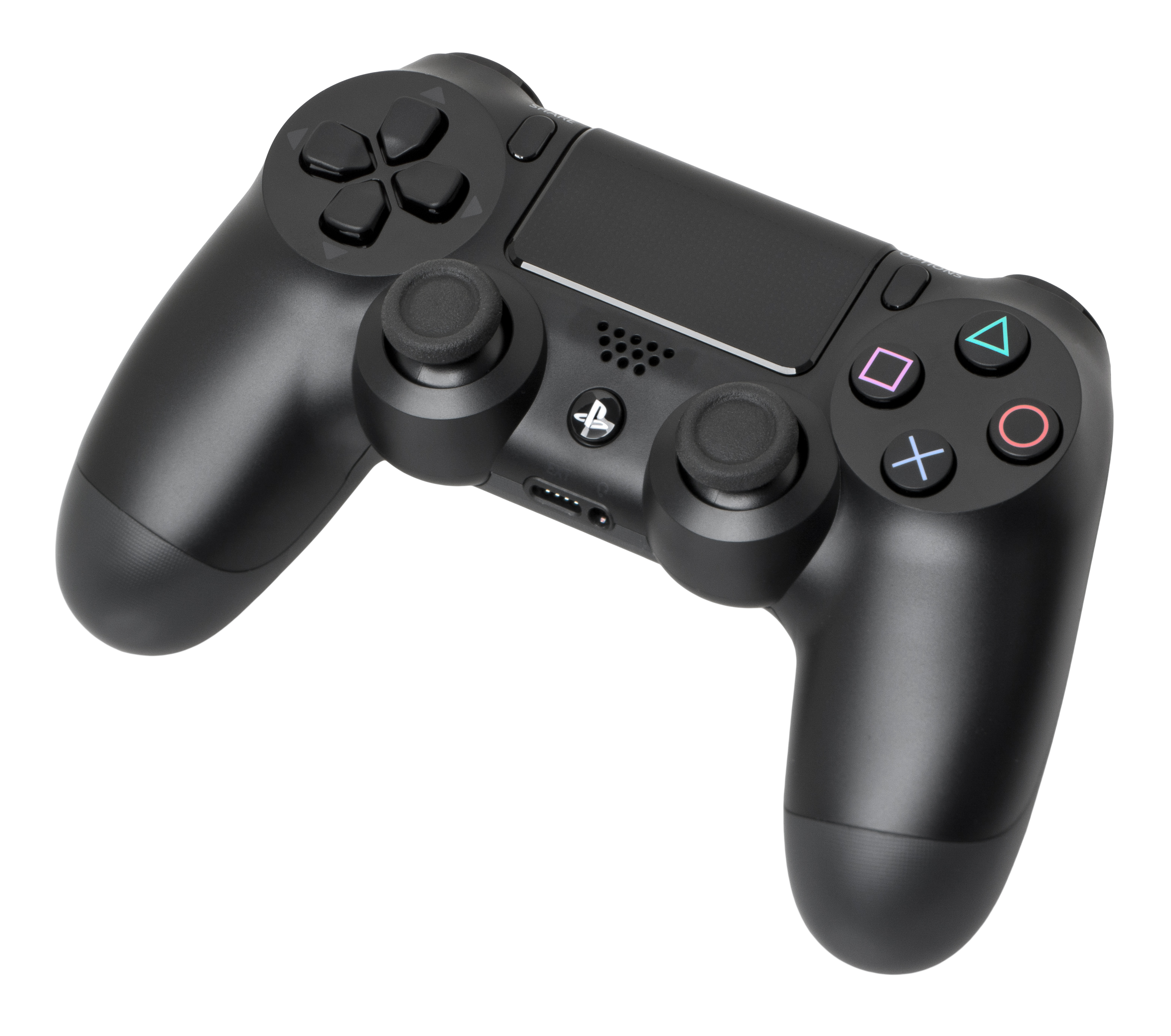
DualShock 4 controller

The DualShock 4 is PlayStation 4's primary controller; it maintains a similar design to previous iterations of the DualShock series, but with additional features and design refinements. Among other tweaks, the caps of the analog sticks were given a concave design (similar to the Xbox 360 controller), the shape of the triggers and shoulder buttons was refined, the D-pad buttons were given a steeper downward angle to provide a resting space in the center for the user's thumb, and the hand grips were made thicker and given microtexturing to improve their feel.

A major addition to the DualShock 4 is a touchpad; it is capable of detecting up to two simultaneous touch presses, and can also be pressed down as a button. The "Start" and "Select" buttons were replaced by "Options" and "Share" buttons; the latter is designed to allow access to the PlayStation 4's social features (including streaming, video recording, and screenshot tools). The DualShock 4 is powered by a non-removable, rechargeable lithium-ion battery, which can be charged using its micro USB connector. The controller also features an internal speaker, and a headphone jack for headsets or headphones; the console is bundled with a pair of headset earbuds.

The controller's motion tracking system is more sensitive than those of the PlayStation 3's controllers. An LED "light bar" was additionally added to the front of the controller; it is designed to allow the PlayStation Camera accessory to further track its motion, but can also be used to provide visual effects and feedback within games (such as, for instance, reflecting a player's low health by turning red).

Although the PS4 and DualShock 4 continue to use Bluetooth for wireless connectivity, the console is incompatible with PlayStation 3 controllers. An exception are the PlayStation Move motion controllers originally released for PS3, which are officially supported for use with the PlayStation Camera. In October 2013, Shuhei Yoshida stated on Twitter that the DualShock 4 would support "basic functions" when attached to a PC. In August 2016, Sony unveiled an official USB wireless adapter for the DualShock 4, enabling use of all of the controller's functionality on PC. In December 2016, Valve's Steam platform was updated to provide support and controller customization functionality for DualShock 4, through existing APIs for the Steam Controller.

A revision of the DualShock 4 was released alongside the "Slim" and Pro models in 2016, and is bundled with these systems. It is largely identical to the original model, except that the touchpad now contains a "stripe" along the top which the light bar's LED can shine through, and the controller can communicate non-wirelessly when connected to the console over USB.

=== Camera ===
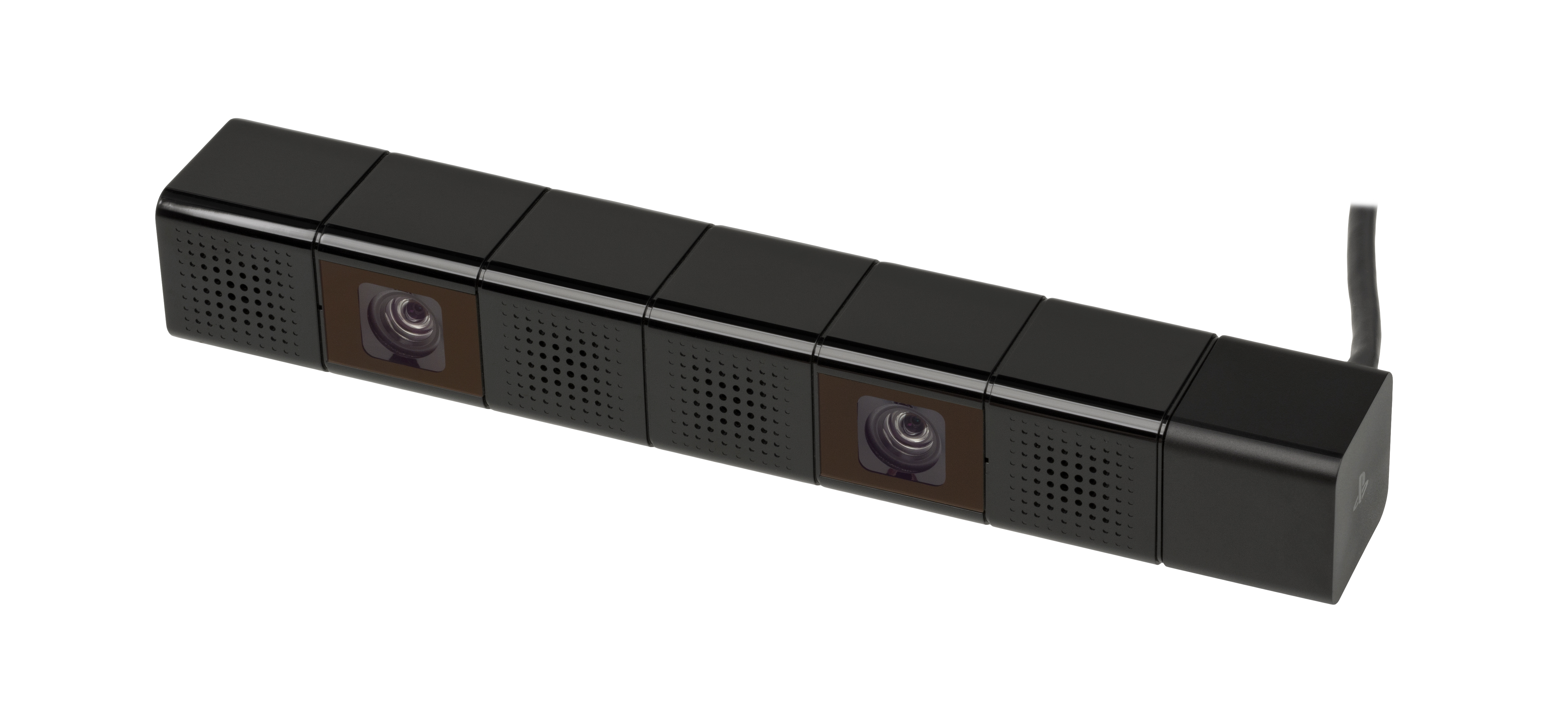
The PlayStation 4 Camera, which is required for use with the PS VR

The PlayStation Camera is an optional motion sensor and camera for the PlayStation 4, similar to Kinect on Xbox. It includes two 1280×800 pixel sensors with f/2.0 lenses (equivalent to 30 cm focusing distance) and an 85° field of view. The dual camera setup allows for different modes of operation, depending on the initiated and running application. The two cameras can be used together for depth-sensing of its surrounding objects in its field of vision. Alternatively, one of the cameras can be used for generating the video image, with the other used for motion tracking.

PlayStation Camera also features a four-channel microphone array, which helps reduce unwanted background noise and can be used for voice commands. With the PlayStation Camera connected, different users can automatically log-on to the system via face detection.

=== PlayStation VR ===
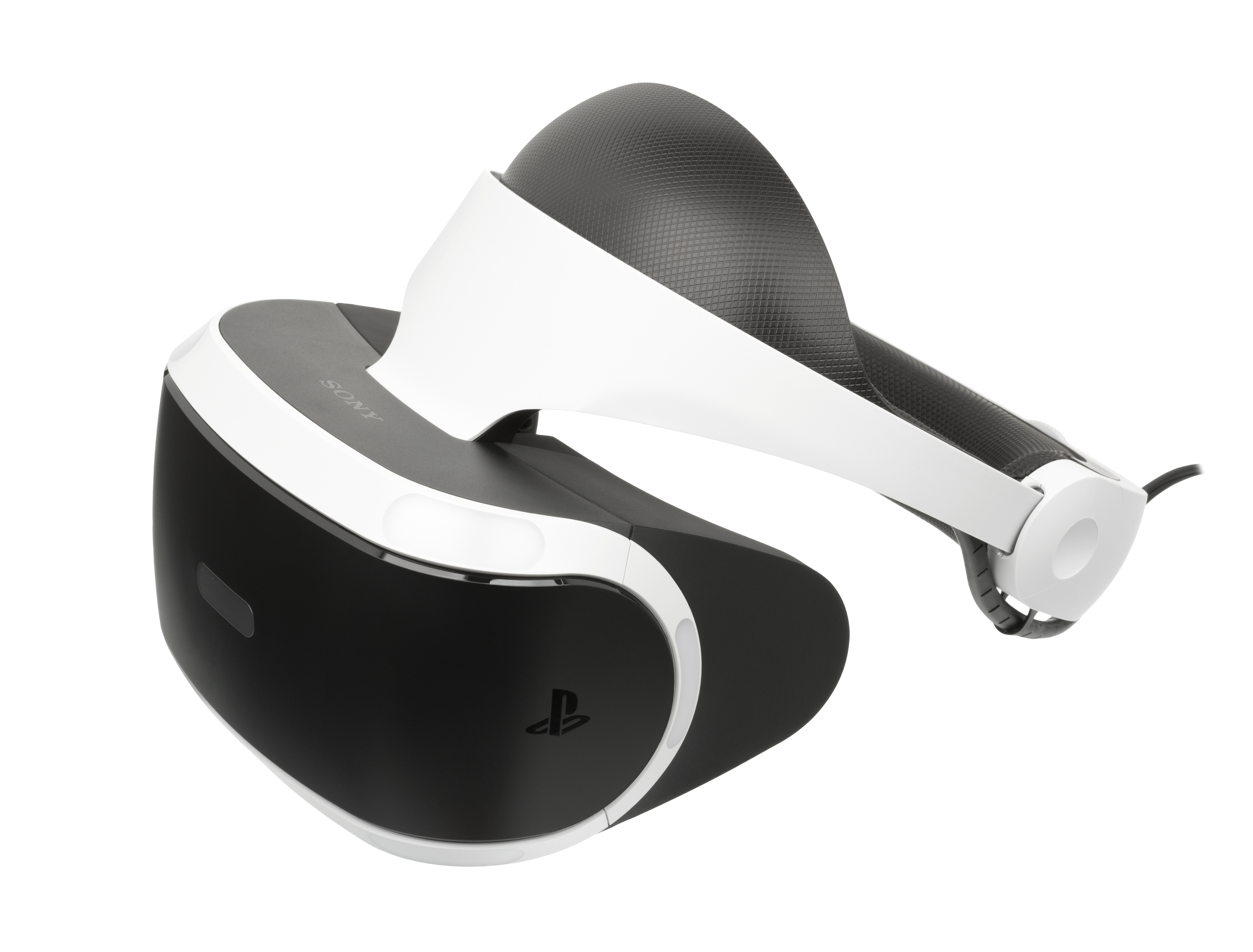
A first-generation PlayStation VR

PlayStation VR is a virtual reality system for PlayStation 4; it consists of a headset, which features a 1080p display panel, LED lights on the headset that are used by PlayStation Camera to track its motion, and a control box that processes 3D audio effects, as well as video output to the external display (either simulcasting the player's VR perspective, or providing an asymmetrical secondary perspective). PlayStation VR can also be used with PlayStation Move motion controllers.

== Software and services ==
=== PlayStation 4 system software ===
The PlayStation 4's operating system is called "Orbis OS", based upon a customized FreeBSD 9.

The console does not require an Internet connection for usage, although more functionality is available when connected.

The console introduces a customizable menu interface, the "PlayStation Dynamic Menu", featuring a variety of color schemes. The interface displays the player's profile, recent activity, notifications, and other details in addition to unlocked trophies. It allows multiple user accounts, all with their own pass-codes. Each player account has the option to share their real name with friends, or use a nickname in other situations when anonymity is important. Facebook profiles can be connected to PlayStation Network accounts, making it easier to recognize friends. The default home screen features real time content from friends. The "What's New" activity feed includes shared media, recently played games, and other notifications. Services from third-party vendors, such as Netflix and Amazon Prime Video, can be accessed within the interface. Multitasking is available during gameplay, such as opening the browser or managing party chat, and switching between applications is done by double-tapping the "PS" button.

The PlayStation Camera or a microphone enables the user to control the system using voice input. Players can command the interface to start a game, take screenshots, and save videos. Saying "PlayStation" initiates voice control, and "All Commands" displays a list of possible commands.

=== Multimedia features ===
The PlayStation 4 supports Blu-ray and DVD playback, including 3D Blu-ray. The playing of CD is no longer supported, as the console no longer has an infrared 780 nm laser. Custom music and video files can still be played from USB drives and DLNA servers using the Media Player app.

=== PlayStation Network ===
The PlayStation 4 allows users to access a variety of free and premium PlayStation Network (PSN) services, including the PlayStation Store, PlayStation Plus subscription service, PlayStation Music powered by Spotify, and the PlayStation Video subscription service, which allows owners to rent or buy TV shows and films à la carte. A United States-exclusive cloud-based television-on-demand service known as PlayStation Vue began beta testing in late November 2014. Sony intends to expand and evolve the services it offers over the console's lifespan. Unlike PS3, a PlayStation Plus membership is required to access multiplayer in most games; this requirement does not apply to free-to-play or subscription-based games.

=== Second screen and remote play ===
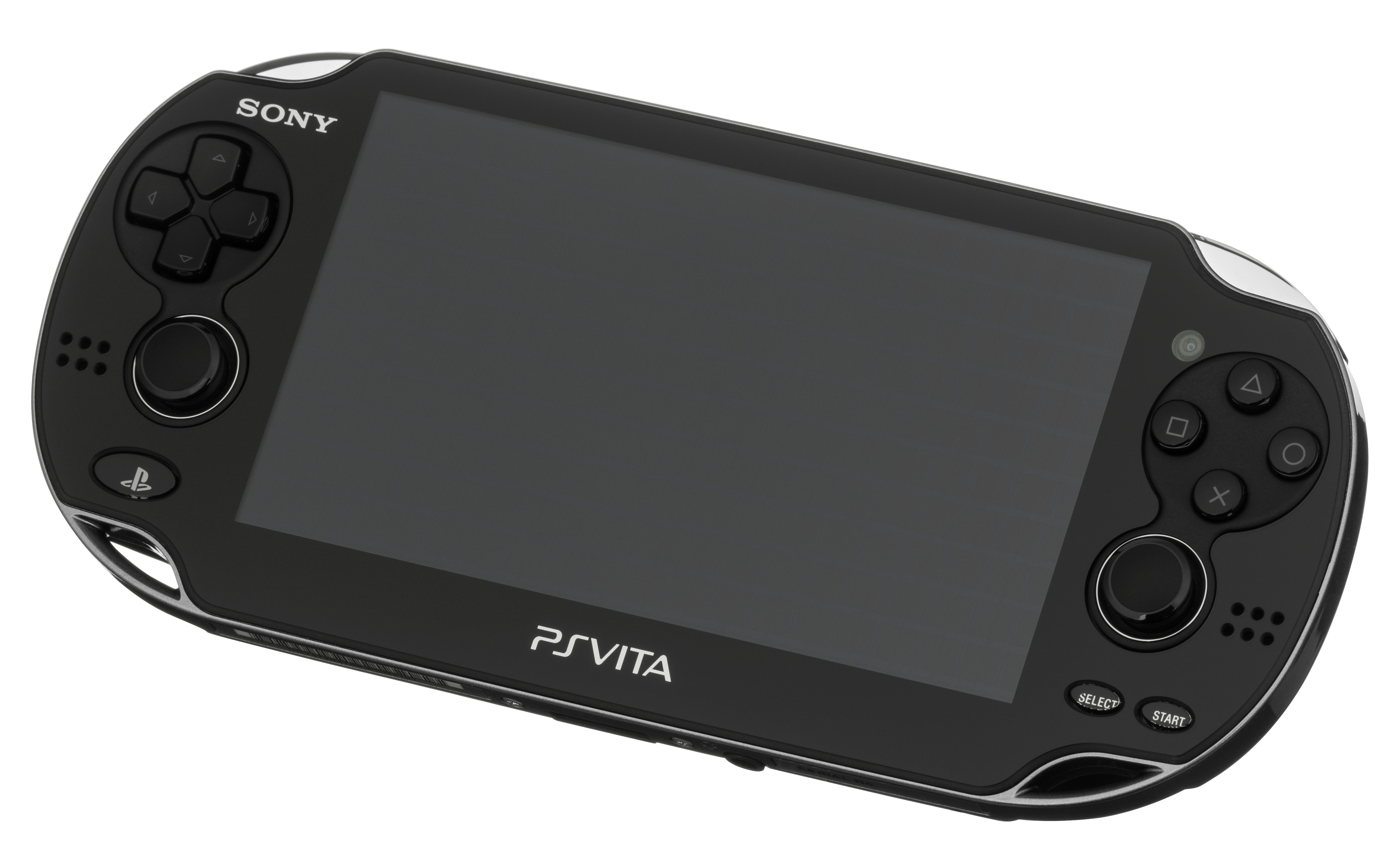
PlayStation Vita can be used for remote play.

Smartphones and tablets can interact with the PlayStation 4 as second screen devices, and can also wake the console from sleep mode. A Sony Xperia smartphone, tablet or the PlayStation Vita can be used for streaming gameplay from the console to handheld, allowing supported games to be played remotely from around a household or away from home. Sony has ambitions to make all PS4 games playable on PlayStation Vita. Developers can add Vita-specific controls for use via Remote Play. This feature was later expanded to enable PS4 Remote Play functionality on Microsoft Windows PCs and on Apple OS X Macs. The update, released in April 2016, allows for Remote Play functionality on computers running Windows 8.1, Windows 10, OS X Yosemite, and OS X El Capitan. Remote Play supports resolution options of 360p, 540p, and 720p (1080p is available on PS4 Pro), frame rate options of 30–60 FPS, and the DualShock 4 can be connected via USB.

The PlayStation App allows iOS and Android mobile devices to interact with the PlayStation 4 from their device. The user can use this application to purchase PS4 games from the console and have them remotely downloaded, watch live streams of other gamers and view in-game maps while playing games.

== Social features ==
"Ustream's integration within PS4 consoles will put gamers on a new media field. They will have the ability to direct, produce, and star in their own video game production, simply by being an awesome (or not so awesome!) gamer."

— Ustream co-founder Brad Hunstable

Sony focused on "social" aspects as a major feature of the console. Although the PS4 has improved social functionality, the features are optional and can be disabled.

=== Community creation ===
Users have the option to create or join community groups based on personal interest. Communities include a discussion board, accomplishments and game clips shared by other members, plus the ability to join group chat and launch cooperative games. Sony stated that "communities are a good way to socialize with like-minded players", particularly when "you want to tackle a big multiplayer raid, but don't have enough friends available." Sony has officially stated that starting April 2021, the community system of the PlayStation Network will be discontinued. This, however, will not prevent users from communicating with their friends in private messaging or in group chats on the PlayStation Network.

=== Media sharing ===
The DualShock 4 controller includes a "SHARE" button, allowing the player to cycle through the last 60 minutes of recorded gameplay to select a screenshot or video clip appropriate for sharing. Media is uploaded seamlessly from the console to other PSN users or social networking sites such as Dailymotion, Facebook, Twitter and YouTube, or else users can copy media to a USB flash drive and upload to a social network or website of their preference. Players can also use a free video editing application named ShareFactory to cut and assemble their favorite video clips and add custom music or voice commentary with green screen effects. Subsequent updates have added options for picture-in-picture layouts, the ability to create photo collages and animated GIFs.

=== Live streaming ===
Gamers can either watch live gameplay of games which their friends are playing through the PS4 interface with cross-game camera and microphone input, spectate silently, or broadcast their own gameplay live via DailyMotion, Twitch, Ustream, Niconico, or YouTube Gaming, allowing for friends and members of the public to view and comment upon them from other web browsers and devices. If a user is not screen-casting, a friend can send them a "Request to Watch" notification.

=== Share Play ===
Share Play allows users to invite an online friend to join their play session via streaming, even if they do not own a copy of the game. Users can pass control of the game entirely to the remote user or partake in cooperative multiplayer as if they were physically present. Mark Cerny says that remote assistance is particularly useful when confronted by a potentially game-defeating obstacle. "You can even see that your friend is in trouble and reach out through the network to take over the controller and assist them through some difficult portion of the game," he said. Share Play requires a PlayStation Plus subscription and can only be used for one hour at a time.

== Games ==
Each PlayStation 4 console comes preinstalled with The Playroom, a game designed to server as demonstration of the DualShock 4 controller and the PlayStation Camera. The PlayStation Camera accessory is required to play The Playroom. If a camera is not present, a trailer for The Playroom will be displayed instead of the full game.

PlayStation 4 games are distributed at retail on Blu-ray Disc, and digitally as downloads through the PlayStation Store. Games are not region-locked, so games purchased in one region can be played on consoles in all regions, and players can sign-on to any PS4 console to access their entire digital game library. All PlayStation 4 games must be installed to the console's storage. Additionally a system called "PlayGo" allows users to begin to play portions of a game (such as opening levels) once the installation or download reaches a specific point, while the remainder of the game is downloaded or installed in the background. Updates to games and system software are also downloaded in the background and while in standby. PS4 users will, in the future, be able to browse games and stream games via Gaikai to demo them almost instantaneously. Sony says it is committed to releasing an ever-increasing number of free-to-play games, including PlanetSide 2 and War Thunder. Sony also took steps to make it easier for independent game developers to release games for the PS4 by giving them the option to self-publish their own games rather than rely upon others to distribute their games.

=== Backward compatibility ===
PlayStation 4 is not compatible with any disc of older PlayStation consoles. Emulated versions of selected PlayStation, PlayStation 2 and PlayStation Portable games are available for purchase via PlayStation Store, which are upscaled to high definition and have support for PS4 social features.

=== PlayStation Now ===
In December 2013, Andrew House indicated that Sony was planning to launch a cloud gaming service for the PS4 in North America within the third quarter of 2014, with a European launch to follow in 2015.

At Consumer Electronics Show on January 7, 2014, Sony unveiled PlayStation Now, a digital distribution service which will initially allow users to access PlayStation 3 games on the PS4 via a cloud-based streaming system, purchasing games individually or via a subscription, as a solution of no backward compatibility on the hardware of the console. The United States Open Beta went live on July 31, 2014. The official United States release of the service was on January 13, 2015. As of March 2015 PlayStation Now was in closed beta in the United Kingdom.

=== PlayLink ===
At E3 2017, Sony revealed the "PlayLink" line of games, which let players control the game with their mobile devices and PlayLink companion apps. The apps would release on November 21 that same year and would include games such as Knowledge is Power, That's You, Hidden Agenda, SingStar Celebration, and Planet of the Apes: Last Frontier. On November 14, 2018, more games would be released, including Just Deal With It, Chimparty, WordHunters, UNO, Melbits World, Ticket To Ride, and Knowledge is Power: Decades. In 2019, the delayed release of Erica made no mention of the PlayLink initiative, when it was planned with PlayLink functionality at the 2017 Paris Games Week event. It would be confirmed by Sony in 2020 that PS4 PlayLink titles would be backwards-compatible with the PlayStation 5. Since 2021, many of the PlayLink companion apps have been delisted from the Apple App Store and Google Play, such as Uno. On December 14, 2023, companion apps for Chimparty, Frantics, Hidden Agenda, Knowledge is Power, Knowledge is Power: Decades, and That's You were no longer downloadable for new Google Play users with devices above Android 9 or 11 due to compatibility issues, with iOS users being unaffected. There are other PlayLink applications that have been published outside of PlayStation, including by Ubisoft for Battleship.

== Release ==
=== Critical reception ===
==== Pre-release ====
"It's abundantly clear that PS4 is being driven as a collaboration between East and West, as opposed to a dictation from one side to the other. Developers are fully involved, activated, discussed and doing really cool collaborative things."

— Mark Rein, Epic Games

Pre-release reception to the console from developers and journalists was positive. Mark Rein of Epic Games praised the "enhanced" architecture of Sony's system, describing it as "a phenomenal piece of hardware". John Carmack, programmer and co-founder of id Software, also commended the design by saying "Sony made wise engineering choices", while Randy Pitchford of Gearbox Software expressed satisfaction with the amount of high-speed memory in the console. Eurogamer also called the graphics technology in the PS4 "impressive" and an improvement from the difficulties developers experienced on the PlayStation 3.

Numerous industry professionals have acknowledged the PlayStation 4's performance advantage over the Xbox One. Speaking to Edge magazine, multiple game developers have described the difference as "significant" and "obvious". ExtremeTech says the PS4's graphics processing unit offers a "serious advantage" over the competition, but due to the nature of cross-platform development, games that share the same assets will appear "very similar". In other scenarios, designers may tap some of PS4's additional power in a straightforward manner, to boost frame rate or output at a higher resolution, whereas games from Sony's own first-party studios that take full advantage of the hardware "will probably look significantly better than anything on the Xbox One."

In response to concerns surrounding the possibility of DRM measures to hinder the resale of used games (and in particular, the initial DRM policies of Xbox One, which did contain such restrictions), Jack Tretton explicitly stated during Sony's E3 press conference that there would be "no restrictions" on the resale and trading of PS4 games on physical media, while software product development head Scott Rohde specified that Sony was planning to disallow online passes as well, going on to say that the policies were designed to be "consumer-friendly, extremely retailer-friendly, and extremely publisher-friendly". After Sony's E3 2013 press conference, IGN responded positively to Sony's attitude towards indie developers and trading games, stating they thought "most gamers would agree" that "if you care about games like [Sony] do, you'll buy a PlayStation 4". PlayStation 4's removable and upgradable hard drive also drew praise from IGN, with Scott Lowe commenting that the decision gave the console "another advantage" over the Xbox One, whose hard drive cannot be accessed.

GameSpot called the PlayStation 4 "the gamer's choice for next-generation", citing its price, lack of restrictive digital rights management, and most importantly, Sony's efforts to "acknowledge its consumers" and "respect its audience" as major factors.

==== Post-release ====
The PlayStation 4 has received very positive reviews from critics. Scott Lowe of IGN gave it an 8.2 rating out of 10 praising the console's DualShock 4 design and social integration features. He criticized the console's lack of software features and for underutilizing the DualShock 4's touch pad. The Gadget Show gave a similar review complimenting the DualShock 4's new triggers and control sticks, in addition to the new Remote Play feature, yet criticized the system's lack of media support at launch. IGN compared the Xbox One and the PlayStation 4 over various categories, allowing their readers to vote for their preferred system. The PS4 won every category offered, and IGN awarded the PS4 with their People's Choice Award.

Shortly following the launch, it became apparent that some games released on multiple platforms were available in higher resolutions on the PS4 as opposed to other video game consoles. Kirk Hamilton of Kotaku reported on the differences in early games such as Call of Duty: Ghosts and Assassin's Creed IV: Black Flag which ran at 1080p on the PS4, but in 720p and 900p, respectively, on the Xbox One.

=== Sales ===
Region	Lifetime sell-through by region	Lifetime sell-through by country
North America	30M	United States 30M (as of September 2019)
Europe	~24M	Germany 7.2M (as of September 2019); United Kingdom 6.8M (as of September 2019); France ~6M (as of September 2019); Italy ~3M (as of December 2018); Spain 700K (as of June 17, 2015); Portugal 100K (as of May 4, 2015)
Asia	+10M	Japan 8.3M (as of September 2019); China ~1.5M (as of August 2, 2018); India ~250,000 (as of March 2018)
Others	200,000	Mexico, Brazil, Argentina ~150,000 (as of December 2014); South Africa 50,000 (as of December 12, 2014)
Worldwide	106.0M (as of December 31, 2019)	

Demand for PlayStation 4 was strong. In August 2013, Sony announced the placement of over a million preorders for the console, while on the North American launch alone, one million PlayStation 4 consoles were sold. In the UK, the PlayStation 4 became the best-selling console at launch, with the sale of 250,000 consoles within a 48-hour period and 530,000 in the first five weeks.

On January 7, 2014, Andrew House announced in his Consumer Electronics Show keynote speech that 4.2 million PS4 units had been sold-through by the end of 2013, with more than 9.7 million software units sold. On February 18, 2014, Sony announced that, as of February 8, it had sold over 5.3 million console units following the release of the PS4 onto the North American and Western/Central European markets. Within the first two days of release in Japan during the weekend of February 22, 2014, 322,083 consoles were sold. PS4 software unit sales surpassed 20.5 million on April 13, 2014. During Japan's 2013 fiscal year, heightened demand for the PS4 helped Sony top global console sales, beating Nintendo for the first time in eight years.

According to data released by Nielsen in August 2014, nine months after the PS4 was released, thirty-one percent of its sales were to existing Wii and Xbox 360 owners, none of whom had by then owned a PS3. At Gamescom 2014, it was announced that 10 million PS4 units had been sold-through to consumers worldwide, and on November 13, it was announced that the PlayStation 4 was the top-selling console in the U.S. for the tenth consecutive month.

In its first sales announcement of 2015, Sony confirmed on January 4 that it had sold-through 18.5 million PlayStation 4 units. Sony updated the sell-through figures for the system throughout 2015: over 20 million consoles as of March 3, 2015, over 30 million as of November 22, 2015, and over 35 million by the end of 2015. As of May 22, 2016, total worldwide sell-through reached 40 million. As of December 2018, over 91 million consoles and more than 876 million PlayStation 4 games have been sold worldwide. By October 2019, the PS4 had sold 102.8 million times, making it the second best-selling video game console of all time, behind the PlayStation 2.

The PlayStation 4 holds a market share of at least 70% within all European countries, as of June 2015.

Lifetime worldwide hardware sell-through	Lifetime worldwide software sell-through	Tie ratio
1.0M (as of November 16, 2013)	—N/a	—N/a
2.1M (as of December 1, 2013)	—N/a	—N/a
4.2M (as of December 28, 2013)	9.7M (as of December 28, 2013)	2.31 games/console
5.3M (as of February 8, 2014)	—N/a	—N/a
6.0M (as of March 2, 2014)	13.7M (as of March 2, 2014)	2.28 games/console
7.0M (as of April 6, 2014)	20.5M (as of April 13, 2014)	2.93 games/console
10.0M (as of August 10, 2014)	30.0M (as of August 10, 2014)	3.00 games/console
14.4M (as of November 22, 2014)	64.0M (as of November 22, 2014)	4.44 games/console
18.5M (as of January 4, 2015)	81.8M (as of January 4, 2015)	4.42 games/console
20.2M (as of March 1, 2015)	—N/a	—N/a
30.2M (as of November 22, 2015)	—N/a	—N/a
35.9M (as of January 3, 2016)	—N/a	—N/a
40.0M (as of May 22, 2016)	270.9M (as of May 22, 2016)	6.77 games/console
50.0M (as of December 6, 2016)	369.6M (as of December 4, 2016)	7.39 games/console
53.4M (as of January 1, 2017)	401.1M (as of January 1, 2017)	7.51 games/console
60.4M (as of June 11, 2017)	487.8M (as of June 11, 2017)	8.08 games/console
70.6M (as of December 3, 2017)	617.8M (as of December 3, 2017)	8.75 games/console
73.6M (as of December 31, 2017)	645.0M (as of December 31, 2017)	8.76 games/console
—N/a	777.9M (as of June 30, 2018)	—N/a
81.2M (as of July 22, 2018)	—N/a	—N/a
86.0M (as of November 18, 2018)	825.3M (as of November 18, 2018)	9.59 games/console
91.6M (as of December 31, 2018)	924.0M (as of December 31, 2018)	10.09 games/console
106.0M (as of December 31, 2019)	1.181B (as of December 31, 2019)	11.14 games/console

Worldwide hardware shipments		Worldwide hardware shipments (including returned and refurbished consoles)	
Quarterly	Lifetime	Quarterly	Lifetime
4.5M (Launch – December 31, 2013)	4.5M (as of December 31, 2013)	4.5M (Launch – December 31, 2013)	4.5M (as of December 31, 2013)
3.0M (January 1, 2014 – March 31, 2014)	7.5M (as of March 31, 2014)	3.1M (January 1, 2014 – March 31, 2014)	7.6M (as of March 31, 2014)
2.7M (April 1, 2014 – June 30, 2014)	10.2M (as of June 30, 2014)	2.8M (April 1, 2014 – June 30, 2014)	10.4M (as of June 30, 2014)
3.3M (July 1, 2014 – September 30, 2014)	13.5M (as of September 30, 2014)	3.4M (July 1, 2014 – September 30, 2014)	13.8M (as of September 30, 2014)
6.4M (October 1, 2014 – December 31, 2014)	19.9M (as of December 31, 2014)	6.4M (October 1, 2014 – December 31, 2014)	20.2M (as of December 31, 2014)
2.4M (January 1, 2015 – March 31, 2015)	22.3M (as of March 31, 2015)	2.3M (January 1, 2015 – March 31, 2015)	22.5M (as of March 31, 2015)
3.0M (April 1, 2015 – June 30, 2015)	25.3M (as of June 30, 2015)	2.9M (April 1, 2015 – June 30, 2015)	25.4M (as of June 30, 2015)
4.0M (July 1, 2015 – September 30, 2015)	29.3M (as of September 30, 2015)	4.0M (July 1, 2015 – September 30, 2015)	29.4M (as of September 30, 2015)
8.4M (October 1, 2015 – December 31, 2015)	37.7M (as of December 31, 2015)	8.4M (October 1, 2015 – December 31, 2015)	37.8M (as of December 31, 2015)
2.3M (January 1, 2016 – March 31, 2016)	40.0M (as of March 31, 2016)	2.4M (January 1, 2016 – March 31, 2016)	40.2M (as of March 31, 2016)
3.5M (April 1, 2016 – June 30, 2016)	43.5M (as of June 30, 2016)	3.5M (April 1, 2016 – June 30, 2016)	43.7M (as of June 30, 2016)
3.9M (July 1, 2016 – September 30, 2016)	47.4M (as of September 30, 2016)	3.9M (July 1, 2016 – September 30, 2016)	47.6M (as of September 30, 2016)
9.7M (October 1, 2016 – December 31, 2016)	57.1M (as of December 31, 2016)	9.7M (October 1, 2016 – December 31, 2016)	57.3M (as of December 31, 2016)
2.9M (January 1, 2017 – March 31, 2017)	60.0M (as of March 31, 2017)	2.9M (January 1, 2017 – March 31, 2017)	60.2M (as of March 31, 2017)
3.3M (April 1, 2017 – June 30, 2017)	63.3M (as of June 30, 2017)	3.3M (April 1, 2017 – June 30, 2017)	63.5M (as of June 30, 2017)
4.2M (July 1, 2017 – September 30, 2017)	67.5M (as of September 30, 2017)	4.2M (July 1, 2017 – September 30, 2017)	67.7M (as of September 30, 2017)
9.0M (October 1, 2017 – December 31, 2017)	76.5M (as of December 31, 2017)	9.0M (October 1, 2017 – December 31, 2017)	76.7M (as of December 31, 2017)
2.5M (January 1, 2018 – March 31, 2018)	79.0M (as of March 31, 2018)	2.5M (January 1, 2018 – March 31, 2018)	79.2M (as of March 31, 2018)
3.2M (April 1, 2018 – June 30, 2018)	82.2M (as of June 30, 2018)	3.2M (April 1, 2018 – June 30, 2018)	82.4M (as of June 30, 2018)
3.9M (July 1, 2018 – September 30, 2018)	86.1M (as of September 30, 2018)	3.9M (July 1, 2018 – September 30, 2018)	86.3M (as of September 30, 2018)
8.1M (October 1, 2018 – December 31, 2018)	94.2M (as of December 31, 2018)	8.1M (October 1, 2018 – December 31, 2018)	94.4M (as of December 31, 2018)
2.6M (January 1, 2019 – March 31, 2019)	96.8M (as of March 31, 2019)	2.6M (January 1, 2019 – March 31, 2019)	97.0M (as of March 31, 2019)
3.2M (April 1, 2019 – June 30, 2019)	100.0M (as of June 30, 2019)	3.2M (April 1, 2019 – June 30, 2019)	100.2M (as of June 30, 2019)
2.8M (July 1, 2019 – September 30, 2019)	102.8M (as of September 30, 2019)	2.8M (July 1, 2019 – September 30, 2019)	103.0M (as of September 30, 2019)
6.1M (October 1, 2019 – December 31, 2019)	108.9M (as of December 31, 2019)	6.0M (October 1, 2019 – December 31, 2019)	109.0M (as of December 31, 2019)
1.5M (January 1, 2020 – March 31, 2020)	110.4M (as of March 31, 2020)	1.4M (January 1, 2020 – March 31, 2020)	110.4M (as of March 31, 2020)
		1.9M (April 1, 2020 – June 30, 2020)	112.3M (as of June 30, 2020)
		1.5M (July 1, 2020 – September 30, 2020)	113.8M (as of September 30, 2020)
		1.4M (October 1, 2020 – December 31, 2020)	115.2M (as of December 31, 2020)
		1.0M (January 1, 2021 – March 31, 2021)	116.2M (as of March 31, 2021)
		0.5M (April 1, 2021 – June 30, 2021)	116.7M (as of June 30, 2021)
		0.2M (July 1, 2021 – September 30, 2021)	116.9M (as of September 30, 2021)
		0.2M (October 1, 2021 – December 31, 2021)	117.1M (as of December 31, 2021)
		0.1M (January 1, 2022 – March 31, 2022)	117.2M (as of March 31, 2022)

Worldwide full game software shipments
Quarterly	Yearly	Tie ratio	Digital download ratio
36.7M (April 1, 2016 – June 30, 2016)		10.49 games/console	
50.1M (July 1, 2016 – September 30, 2016)		12.85 games/console	
80.5M (October 1, 2016 – December 31, 2016)		8.30 games/console	
50.6M (January 1, 2017 – March 31, 2017)		17.45 games/console	
	217.9M (April 1, 2016 – March 31, 2017)	10.90 games/console	27%
38.7M (April 1, 2017 – June 30, 2017)		11.73 games/console	39%
69.7M (July 1, 2017 – September 30, 2017)		16.60 games/console	27%
86.5M (October 1, 2017 – December 31, 2017)		9.61 games/console	28%
52.0M (January 1, 2018 – March 31, 2018)		20.80 games/console	43%
	246.9M (April 1, 2017 – March 31, 2018)	12.99 games/console	32%
40.6M (April 1, 2018 – June 30, 2018)		12.69 games/console	43%
75.1M (July 1, 2018 – September 30, 2018)		19.26 games/console	28%
87.2M (October 1, 2018 – December 31, 2018)		10.77 games/console	37%
54.7M (January 1, 2019 – March 31, 2019)		21.04 games/console	45%
	257.6M (April 1, 2018 – March 31, 2019)	14.47 games/console	37%
42.9M (April 1, 2019 – June 30, 2019)		13.41 games/console	53%
61.3M (July 1, 2019 – September 30, 2019)		21.89 games/console	37%
81.1M (October 1, 2019 – December 31, 2019)		13.30 games/console	49%
59.6M (January 1, 2020 – March 31, 2020)		39.73 games/console	66%
	245.0M (April 1, 2019 – March 31, 2020)	18.01 games/console	51%

Worldwide total software unit sales (including download-only, bundled, and PS VR titles)
Quarterly	Yearly	Tie ratio	First party	First party ratio	Digital download ratio
39.9M (April 1, 2016 – June 30, 2016)		11.40 games/console			
54.0M (July 1, 2016 – September 30, 2016)		13.85 games/console			
85.5M (October 1, 2016 – December 31, 2016)		8.81 games/console			
54.9M (January 1, 2017 – March 31, 2017)		18.93 games/console			
	234.2M (April 1, 2016 – March 31, 2017)	11.71 games/console			27%
45.9M (April 1, 2017 – June 30, 2017)		13.91 games/console			39%
76.1M (July 1, 2017 – September 30, 2017)		18.12 games/console			27%
92.8M (October 1, 2017 – December 31, 2017)		10.31 games/console			28%
59.4M (January 1, 2018 – March 31, 2018)		23.76 games/console			43%
	274.2M (April 1, 2017 – March 31, 2018)	14.43 games/console			32%
47.7M (April 1, 2018 – June 30, 2018)		14.91 games/console			43%
82.3M (July 1, 2018 – September 30, 2018)		21.10 games/console			28%
95.6M (October 1, 2018 – December 31, 2018)		11.80 games/console			37%
62.3M (January 1, 2019 – March 31, 2019)		23.96 games/console			45%
	287.9M (April 1, 2018 – March 31, 2019)	16.17 games/console	50.6M	18%	37%
49.8M (April 1, 2019 – June 30, 2019)		15.56 games/console	11.7M	23%	53%
70.6M (July 1, 2019 – September 30, 2019)		25.21 games/console	6.3M	9%	37%
83.3M (October 1, 2019 – December 31, 2019)		13.88 games/console	16.3M	20%	49%
64.9M (January 1, 2020 – March 31, 2020)		46.36 games/console	9.1M	14%	66%
	268.7M (April 1, 2019 – March 31, 2020)	19.90 games/console	43.3M	16%	51%
91.0M (April 1, 2020 – June 30, 2020)		47.89 games/console	18.5M	20%	74%

PlayStation Plus subscribers	Monthly active users
20.8M (as of March 31, 2016)	
26.4M (as of March 31, 2017)	
27.0M (as of June 30, 2017)	
28.1M (as of September 30, 2017)	
31.5M (as of December 31, 2017)	
34.2M (as of March 31, 2018)	
33.9M (as of June 30, 2018)	
34.3M (as of September 30, 2018)	
36.3M (as of December 31, 2018)	
36.4M (as of March 31, 2019)	
36.2M (as of June 30, 2019)	
36.9M (as of September 30, 2019)	
38.8M (as of December 31, 2019)	
41.5M (as of March 31, 2020)	
44.9M (as of June 30, 2020)	
47.6M (as of March 31, 2021)	113M (as of March, 2021)

== Hardware revisions ==
The PlayStation 4 has been produced in various models: the original, the Slim, and the Pro. Successive models have added or removed various features, and each model has variations of Limited Edition consoles.

=== PlayStation 4 Slim ===
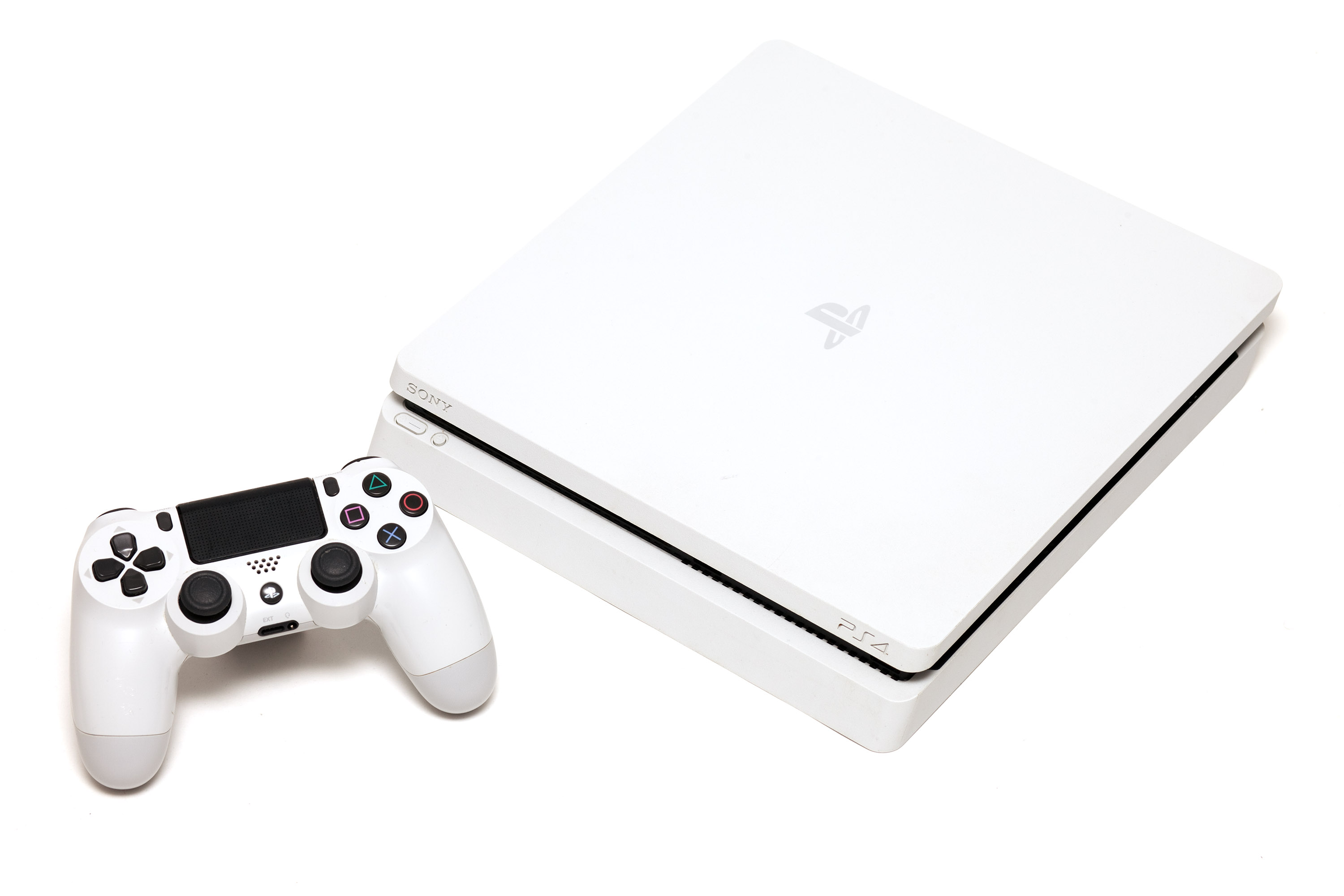
A white PlayStation 4 Slim

On September 7, 2016, Sony announced a hardware revision of the PlayStation 4, model number CUH-2000, known colloquially as the PlayStation 4 Slim, which phased out the original model. It is a revision of the original PS4 hardware with a smaller form factor; it has a rounded body with a matte finish on the top of the console rather than a two-tone finish, and is 40% smaller in size than the original model. The two USB ports on the front have been updated to the newer USB 3.1 standard and have a larger gap between them, and the optical audio port was removed. This model also features support for USB 3.1, Bluetooth 4.0 and 5.0 GHz Wi-Fi.

It was released on September 15, 2016, with a 500 GB model at the same price as the original version of the PlayStation 4. On April 18, 2017, Sony announced that it had replaced this base model with a 1 TB version at the same MSRP.

=== PlayStation 4 Pro ===
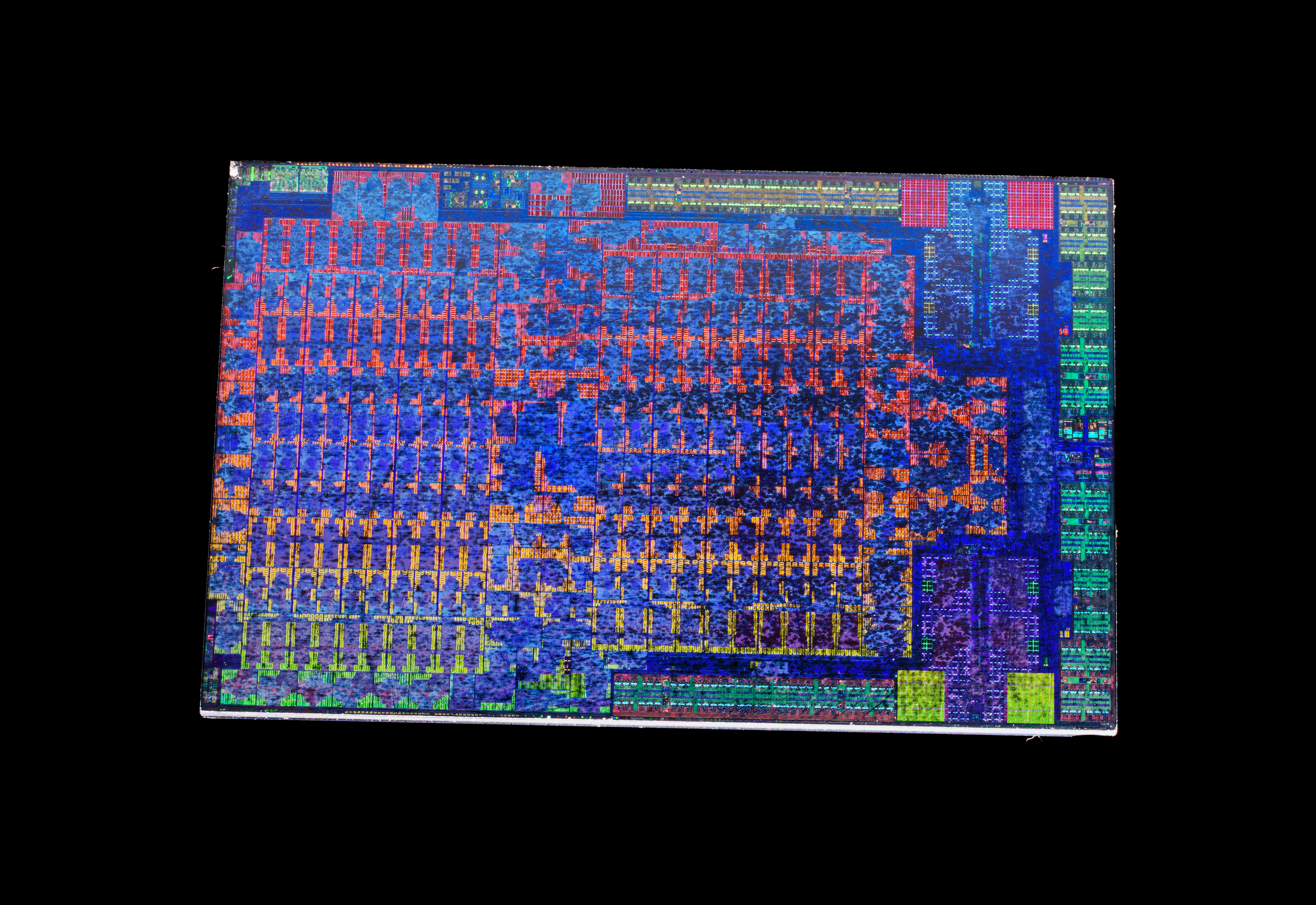
Infrared photograph of the PS4 Pro's APU die

The PlayStation 4 Pro (codenamed Neo, model number CUH-7000) was announced on September 7, 2016, and launched worldwide on November 10, 2016. It is an upgraded version of the PlayStation 4 with improved hardware to enable 4K rendering and improved PlayStation VR performance, including an upgraded GPU with 4.2 teraflops of processing power and hardware support for checkerboard rendering, and a higher CPU clock. As with PS4 "Slim", this model also features support for USB 3.1, Bluetooth 4.0 and 5.0 GHz Wi-Fi. The PS4 Pro also includes 1 GB of DDR3 memory that is used to swap out non-gaming applications that run in the background, allowing games to utilize an additional 512 MB of the console's GDDR5 memory. Although capable of streaming 4K video, the PS4 Pro does not support Ultra HD Blu-ray. The Pro model has a release price of $399 (NA), €399 (Europe), and £349 (UK).

Games marketed by Sony as PS4 Pro Enhanced have specific optimizations when played on this model, such as 4K resolution graphics or higher performance. For games not specifically optimized, an option known as "Boost Mode" was added on system software 4.5, which can be enabled to force higher CPU and GPU clock rates to possibly improve performance.

Rendering games at 4K resolution is achieved through various rendering techniques and hardware features; PlayStation technical chief Mark Cerny explained that Sony could not "brute force" 4K without compromising form factor and cost, so the console was designed to support "streamlined rendering techniques" using custom hardware, "best-in-breed temporal and spatial anti-aliasing algorithms", and "many new features from the AMD Polaris architecture as well as several even beyond it". The most prominent technique used is checkerboard rendering, wherein the console only renders portions of a scene using a checkerboard pattern, and then uses algorithms to fill in the non-rendered segments. The checkerboarded screen can then be smoothed using an anti-aliasing filter. Hermen Hulst of Guerrilla Games explained that PS4 Pro could render something "perceptively so close [to 4K] that you wouldn't be able to see the difference".

The PS4 Pro supports Remote Play, Share Play, and streaming at up to 1080p resolution at 60 frames per second, as well as capturing screenshots at 2160p, and 1080p video at 30 frames per second.

In late 2017, Sony issued a new PS4 Pro revision (model number CUH-7100) that featured updated internal components. The actual hardware specifications and performance remained the same as the original model, although it was found that the revised console has a slightly quieter fan profile than the original and as a result was operating at a slightly higher temperature under load than the CUH-7000. In October 2018, Sony quietly issued another revision (model number CUH-7200), initially as part of Red Dead Redemption 2 hardware bundles. The revision has a different power supply which uses the same type of cord as the "Slim" model, and was shown to have further improvements to acoustics.
