= Amaryllo =

Multinational cloud platform

Amaryllo Inc.
- Type: Private
- Industry: Cloud Platform; Consumer Electronics; GPU Rental Services; Home Automation; Online Services; Software Services
- Founded: Amsterdam, the Netherlands in 2012
- Founder: Marcus Yang
- Headquarters: 2372 Morse Avenue, Suite 523, Irvine, United States
- Area served: Worldwide
- Products: One-Time Payment Cloud Storage Cloud Storage Gift Cards Enterprise Cloud High-Performance GPU Rental Smart Home Security Patented Encryption Software Cloud Computing Data Centers Solutions Smart Vending Machine Solutions
- Brands: Amaryllo
- Services: Amaryllo Cloud Service
- Website: www.amaryllo.us, www.myhpcloud.com

Amaryllo Inc. is a multinational company founded in Amsterdam, the Netherlands, and now headquartered in the United States. It operates as a cloud service platform, providing cloud storage and cloud computing solutions to enterprises and brand companies. Amaryllo began with Skype IP camera development, pioneering biometric robotic technologies, encrypted P2P network, and secure cloud storage.

Amaryllo was founded by Band of Angels member, Marcus Yang to develop patents for a new type of robotic cameras that is claimed to "talk, hear, sense, recognize human faces, and track intruders". It also claims to have made the world's first security robot based on the WebRTC protocol, Icam PRO FHD, and won the 2015 CES Best of Innovation Award under Embedded Technology category. Its home security robots claim to employ 256-bit encryption and run on the WebRTC protocol. Amaryllo products are sold in over 100 Countries across 6 Continents.

== History ==
Amaryllo revealed its first smart home security products at Internationale Funkausstellung Berlin (IFA) 2013 with a Skype-enabled IP camera called iCam HD. Amaryllo announced its second Skype-certified smart home product, iBabi HD, at CES 2014. The company was chosen as a "Cool Vendor" by Gartner in Connected Home 2014. Amaryllo introduced WebRTC-based smart home products after Microsoft terminated embedded Skype services in mid 2014. Since then, Amaryllo has been developing camera robots with auto-tracking and facial recognition technologies. Its camera robots, ATOM AR3 and ATOM AR3S, were introduced in late 2016. It focuses on wired and wireless technology based on AI services.

== Cloud Service Platform ==
Amaryllo offers prepaid cloud storage through digital codes and gift cards, distributed via InComm Payments, Blackhawk Network, and other partners. It provides high-performance cloud computing service through Rescale partnership. Amaryllo provides free cameras under an annual cloud storage subscription on its website.

== Global Supercomputing Network (GSN) ==
The Global Supercomputing Network (GSN) is a distributed high-performance computing (HPC) platform developed by Amaryllo. The network is designed to provide scalable Infrastructure as a Service (IaaS) by connecting a global array of data centers to offer GPU computing resources for specialized industrial and scientific applications.

=== Architecture and Technology ===
GSN operates as a decentralized distributed network of servers rather than a single centralized supercomputer. The platform integrates an artificial intelligence assistant named Genie, also developed by Amaryllo. Genie's primary function is to manage computing allocation, helping users identify and connect to available resources across the network’s various nodes based on the specific requirements of their tasks.

=== Services ===
The network primarily focuses on the rental of GPU processing resources, catering to fields that require massive parallel processing capabilities, including:

- Artificial Intelligence and Machine Learning: Training large language models (LLMs) and neural networks.
- Scientific Simulations: Executing complex calculations in physics, chemistry, and bioinformatics.
- Data Analytics: Processing large-scale datasets.

By utilizing a rental model, GSN allows organizations to access high-end hardware without the capital expenditure associated with purchasing and maintaining physical server infrastructure.

=== Infrastructure and Partnerships ===
The network’s physical footprint is expanded through strategic partnerships with data center operators. GSN collaborates with MettaDC and Cyber DC to provide colocation services. These partnerships facilitate the deployment of Nvidia server clusters within secure, Tier-rated facilities, ensuring high availability and connectivity for GSN users.

== Official Brand Licensee of HP ==
Amaryllo Inc. is an official licensee of HP Inc., managing both B2B and B2C cloud services under the HP brand. Through this partnership, Amaryllo offers a range of secure and scalable cloud solutions, including HP Cloud, which provides subscription and one-time payment storage for reliable data backup and storage for individuals, families, and businesses. HP Cloud employs cloud computing technologies to create smart albums for users.
