= Brad Hunstable =

American businessman

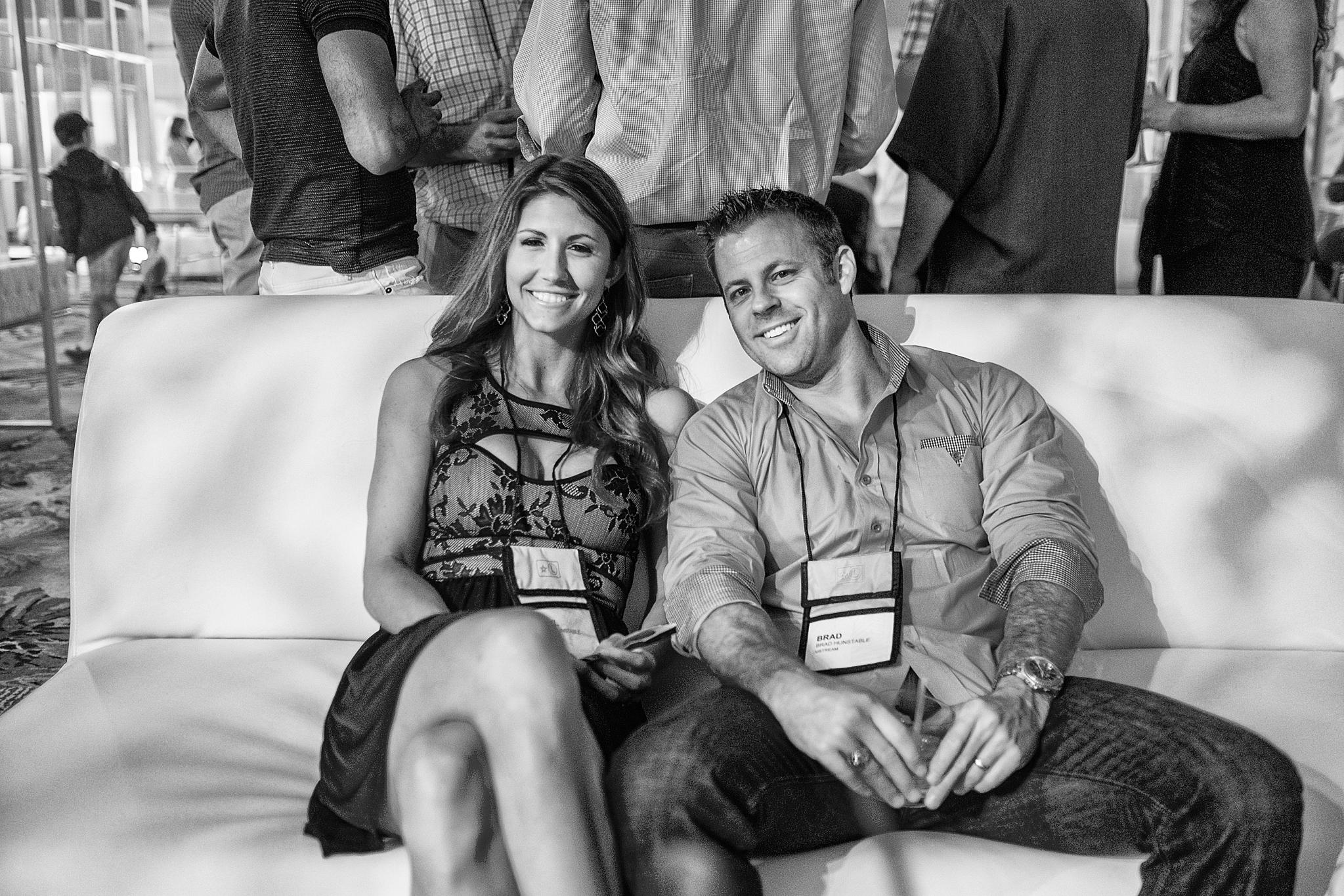
- Hunstable in 2012
- Born: September 26, 1978 (age 48); Tarrant County, Texas
- Occupations: Co-founder and CEO of Ustream
- Spouse: April Hunstable (m. 2003)
- Children: 3 (1 deceased)
- Website: ustream.tv

Fred Bradley Hunstable (born 1978) is an American businessman and the co-founder and CEO of the electric motor company Linear Labs.

Linear Labs was founded by Hunstable in 2014 with his father, Fred Hunstable. Brad is also the co-founder and former CEO of UStream, which was sold to IBM in 2016 for $150 million.

Hunstable was the founder and former CEO of San Francisco, California-based live streaming website Ustream.tv, one of the largest consumer live video sites on the Internet. In 2014, he was honored as one of the SF Business Times "40 Under 40" for the most influential young leaders across the spectrum of Bay Area businesses. In 2016, Ustream was acquired by IBM for a reported $150 million.

Ranked among 50 "Digital Power Players" by The Hollywood Reporter in 2010, Hunstable was announced on Variety Producers Guild of America's 2010 Digital 25: Visionaries, Innovators and Producers list for his work at Ustream.

Ustream was selected as a PC Magazine Editor's Choice. Notable investors include Softbank, DCM, Frank J. Caufield, and the Band Of Angels. General Wesley Clark serves on Ustream.TV's board of advisors.

Hunstable is the father of three children. One of them, Hayden, tragically died on April 17, 2020, after committing suicide. The Hunstable family set up the charity Hayden's Corner in his honour.

== Biography ==
=== Early life ===
Fred Bradley Hunstable was born on September 26, 1978, in Tarrant County, Texas, and grew up in Granbury, Texas, with a younger sister (Ashlee) and a younger brother (Nathan). His parents are Fred Eugene Hunstable, an electrical engineer, and Candace "Candy" Lee Cotter, a school teacher. Since childhood, he has shown an interest in technology. At age 11, he started a small bulletin board system called the Dark Realms with cosysop James Gollehon.

=== Education ===
Hunstable graduated from Granbury High School in Granbury, Texas, in 1997. He went on to receive his Bachelor of Science degree in engineering management from the United States Military Academy in 2001. Upon graduation, he was commissioned as a second lieutenant in the U.S. Army, working primarily as an operations officer. Later, through the Army, Hunstable attended the Ohio State University's Fisher College of Business, where he received his Master of Business Administration degree in finance and real estate in 2005.

=== After West Point ===
Hunstable was required to serve five years in the U.S. Army. He served in various capacities around the world, working jobs both for the Army and the Department of Defense directly.

In 2005, he left the military to work for Hillwood Development, a real estate company owned by Ross Perot, developing master planned communities in Dallas/Fort Worth.

=== Ustream ===
Ustream was born when the founders (John Ham, Hunstable, and Dr. Gyula Feher) wanted a way for their friends in the Army who were deployed overseas in Iraq during the war to be able to communicate with their families back home. A product such as Ustream would give them a way to talk to all their relatives at once, when free time in the war zone was limited.

Previously, these three had worked together on an internet-based event photo-sharing website using technology developed by Dr. Feher. In 2003, both Brad and John Ham were deployed on active duty, ending this venture. After returning to civilian life, Brad and John discussed the idea of the general public using the Internet to share live video. Seeing this as a viable product, they contacted their former partner, Dr. Feher, to develop the technology required. Ustream.tv was founded in 2006, as experiments in broadcasting Brad's brother Nathan's band (Venture) proved successful. Early testing involved Brad in the audience with a camera wired to a laptop (with a cellular card) in his backpack, sending the stream back to their test server.

Launching their public beta in March 2007, Ustream.tv was the first of a series of live video sites, including Justin.tv and Operator11.com. The company has seen "growth" in the political, entertainment, and technology fields.

Ustream.tv have hosted streamings from politicians Hillary Clinton, Barack Obama, and John Edwards and artists Tori Amos and the Plain White T's. The technology community has also adopted Ustream to include Robert Scoble, Leo Laporte, and Chris Pirillo.

Ustream.tv has raised over $60 million in funding, most recently from Softbank.

== Personal life ==
Hunstable is married to April Hunstable, and they have three children together.

He has two siblings, Nathan Hunstable and Ashlee Smith.

Hunstable's son Hayden died in a suicide on April 17, 2020. The Hunstables started the non-profit Hayden's Corner to promote parents starting conversations with their children to help prevent childhood suicide, the #3 cause of death in 10-14 year olds.
