= Glen McLaughlin =

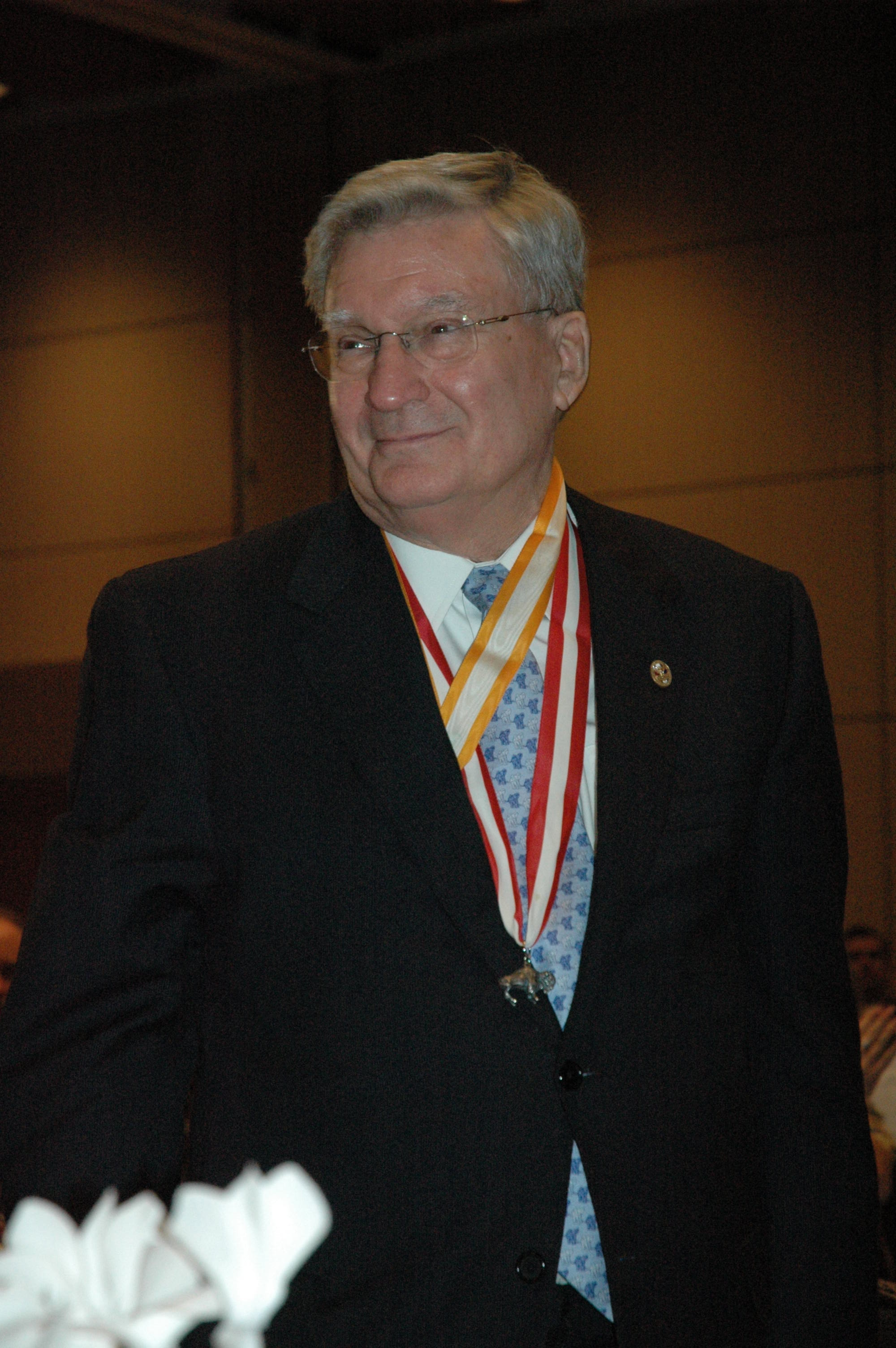
- Glen McLaughlin
- Born: December 21, 1934 (age 91); Shawnee, Oklahoma
- Education: BBA Accounting - University of Oklahoma, MBA Harvard University
- Occupations: Venture Capitalist, Philanthropist
- Employer: Band of Angels
- Spouse: Ellen McLaughlin
- Children: Glen W. McLaughlin; Helen McLaughlin O'Rourke

Glen McLaughlin is a venture capitalist "angel" in the Silicon Valley, a past president of Santa Clara County Council, and a past member of the National Executive Board of the Boy Scouts of America.

== Background ==
McLaughlin was born on December 21, 1934, in Shawnee, Oklahoma, during the Great Depression. His father, originally a farmer, transitioned to work in the oil fields. He married Mattie Jenkins, and together they had three sons, with Glen being the eldest. Like many young people of that era, he held various odd jobs such as delivering milk and newspapers. He attended Harrison Grade School and the family were faithful members of Victory Baptist Church. He began his long-time interest in the Boy Scouts and later became a Distinguished Eagle Scout. While attending Shawnee High School he elected Student Council President and was chosen by his fellow students as "most Likely to Succeed." He was accepted to the World Jamboree in Austria in 1951 and Scout officials and Shawnee townspeople helped him raise the $1,100 required for the trip, which he was to say later, changed his life. He then attended the University of Oklahoma and graduated with a business degree in 1956. He worked as an accountant for the Boeing Co. in Wichita, Kansas, until his stretch with the Air Force at Lackland Air Force Base in San Antonio, TX. He was accepted into flight school and eventually served in Prestwick Air Base in Scotland. After his discharge he attended Harvard Business School and upon graduating he married Ellen Schnake, on August 29, 1964, a teacher from Ohio he had met in Scotland. They moved to California and he was hired at Foremorst Dairies, Inc. and the founder of the McLaughlin Prize for Research in Ethics in Accounting and Taxation. He is head of the order of the Knights of St. John, and also a recipient of the Silver Buffalo Award and Silver Antelope Award.
