= Granbury High School =

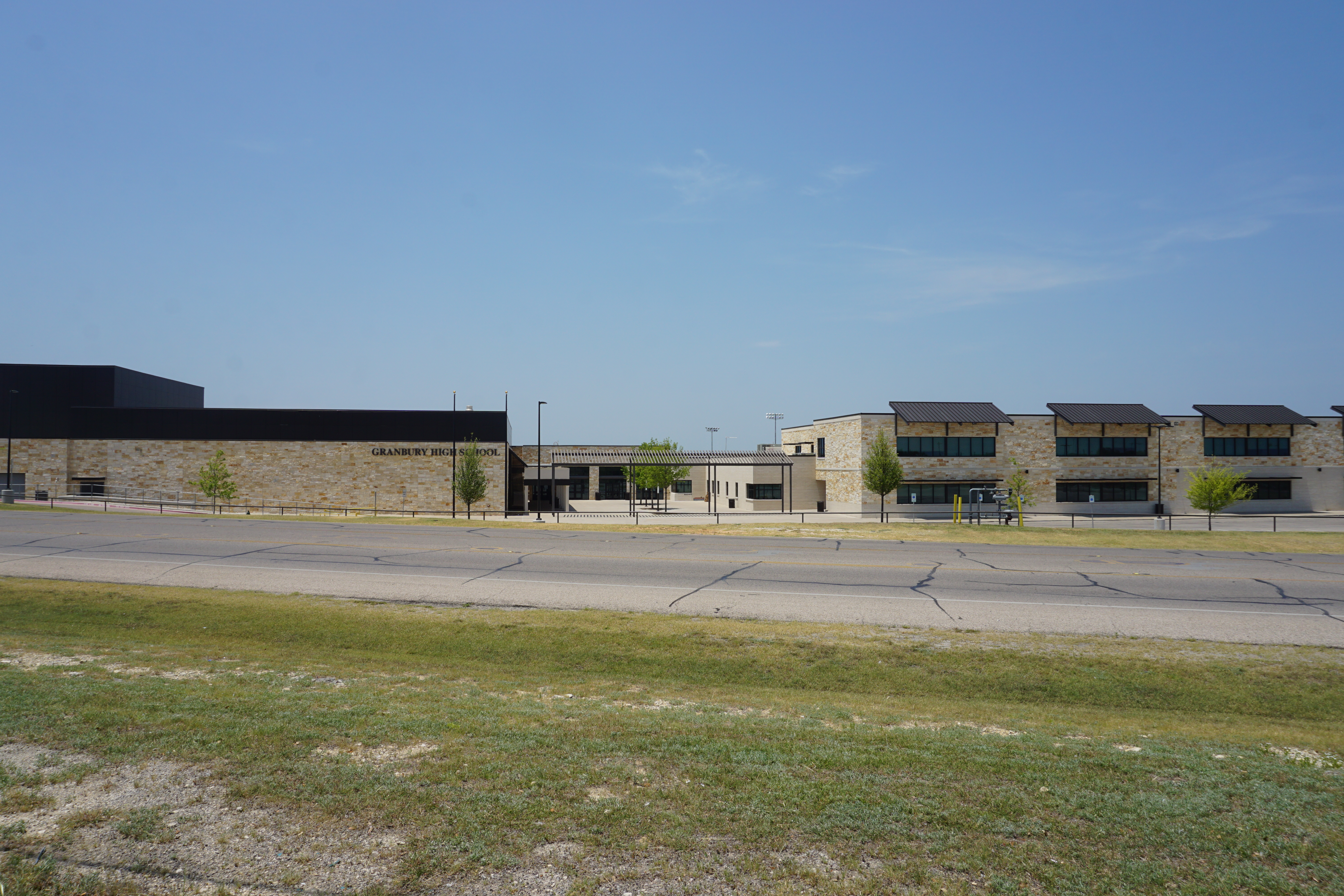
- Granbury High School in 2018

Location
- 2000 W. Pearl St. Granbury, Texas, Hood County, 76048-1888; United States; 32.438537°N 97.810000°W

Information
- Type: Public
- Established: 1870s
- School district: Granbury Independent School District
- NCES District ID: 4821390
- NCES School ID: 482139002141
- Principal: Duane Fish
- Teaching staff: 155.78 (FTE)
- Grades: 9-12
- Student to teacher ratio: 14.22
- Colours: Purple and Gold
- Athletics conference: UIL Class AAAAAA
- Mascot: Pirate/Lady Pirates
- Website: Granbury High School

Granbury High School is a public high school located in the city of Granbury, Texas, United States and classified as a 6A school by the University Interscholastic League (UIL). It is part of the Granbury Independent School District which serves students grades 9–12 from Granbury, Hood County along with portions of Johnson County and Parker County. The school was founded around 1870 at a different location. The present high school was built in the 1970s at its current location. It was the first public school in Hood County. In 2015, the school was rated "Met Standard" by the Texas Education Agency.

== Athletics ==
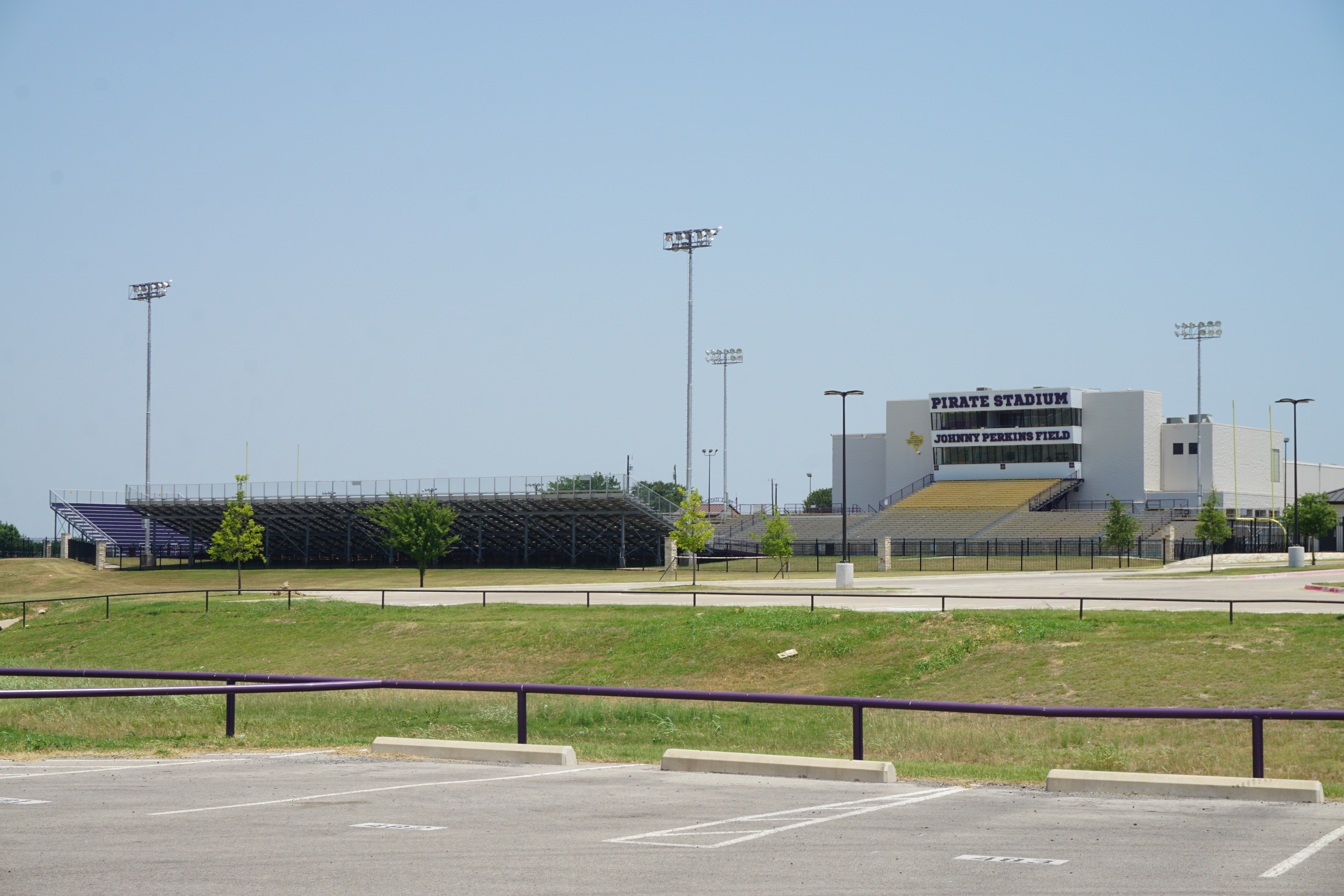
Johnny Perkins Field at Pirate Stadium

The Granbury Pirates compete in volleyball, cross country, football, basketball, powerlifting, swimming, soccer, golf, tennis, track, baseball, and softball.

=== State titles ===
- Boys Soccer -
  - 1999(4A)

==== State finalists ====
- Girls basketball –
  - 1954(1A), 1955(1A), 1978(2A)

=== Leta Andrews ===
Granbury High School was the home to Leta Andrews, the winningest high school basketball coach in the United States. She won 1,416 games during her 52 seasons of coaching, surpassing Robert Hughes, who won 1,333 games in his career. She announced her retirement on May 1, 2014.

== Notable alumni ==
- Brad Hunstable, CEO and co-founder of Linear Labs, former CEO and co-founder of Ustream.tv
- Jia Perkins, former WNBA player
- Dana Vollmer, four time Olympic gold medalist and world record holder for swimming
