= IBM Cloud Video =

Video streaming platform

IBM Watson Media
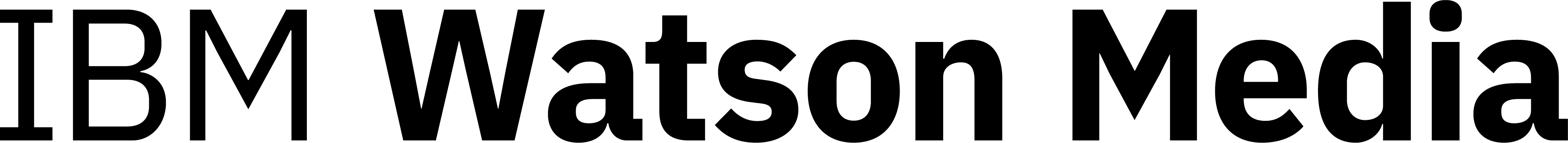
- Website type: Video streaming
- Available in: English, German, Hungarian, Japanese, Russian, Spanish and Korean
- Owner: IBM
- Website: ibm.com/watson/media
- Commercial: Yes
- Registration: Optional
- Launched: March 2007; 19 years ago
- Current status: Active
- Native clients on: iOS, Android

IBM Watson Media (formerly Ustream and IBM Cloud Video) is an American virtual events platform company which is a division of IBM. Prior to the IBM acquisition, it had more than 180 employees across San Francisco, Los Angeles, and Budapest offices. Ustream had received $11.1 million in Series A funding for new product development from Doll Capital Management (DCM) and investors Labrador Ventures and Band of Angels.

Since 2016, it has been a division of IBM. On April 1, 2018, two years after its purchase, Ustream changed its name to IBM Cloud Video to reflect its new ownership, but rapidly changed that name to IBM Watson Media to reflect the embedded artificial intelligence capabilities of IBM's Watson.

== History ==
Ustream was launched when the founders (John Ham, Brad Hunstable and Gyula Fehér) wanted a way for their friends in the US Army, who were deployed overseas in the Iraq War, to be able to communicate with their families. A product like Ustream would provide them with a way to talk to all of their relatives at once when free time in the war zone was limited.

=== Acquisition ===
Early investors included DCM Ventures and Softbank, the latter of which invested $20 million in 2010 with an option to invest additional capital. On January 21, 2016, IBM acquired Ustream for up to $150 million. It was combined with Aspera, Clearleap, and Cleversafe to form IBM's Cloud Video [IBM Watson Media] unit. IBM envisioned the use of its technology as part of an enterprise video offering.

== Notable users ==
IBM Cloud Video was used by politicians such as Hillary Clinton, Barack Obama, John Edwards, video game streamers and artists such as Kanye West, Jimmy Buffett, Tyler, The Creator, Lil Wayne, Linkin Park, Tori Amos, Deadmau5, Rivers Cuomo, Ariana Grande & the Plain White T's. Lifecasters such as iJustine and E-TARD The LifeCaster have also used IBM Cloud Video. Notable companies/universities/other who have used IBM Cloud Video include Salesforce, University of Pennsylvania Wharton, Herman Miller, Mazda, US Open, Fox Sports (United States) World Cup, USA Network: Mr. Robot, Sony for the PlayStation 4, University of Georgia, Grohe, a California superior court and Roland Corporation.

== Plans ==
The plans for IBM Cloud Video are, from cheapest to most expensive, Silver, Gold and Platinum. IBM offers a 30-day free trial for IBM Cloud Video which includes all the features of Silver/Gold/Platinum, phone and chat support with a live monitoring console and a single admin and user seat. Here is a comparison table of features including Silver, Gold and Platinum. All plans include HD transcoding, phone and chat support with a live monitoring console, video embed control and API access, channel branding, passwords and a registration gate, a chat, Q&A, polling and clickable video overlays, an automatic archive with AI closed captions, and simulated live and playlists.

Features Comparison
Silver	Gold	Platinum
100 viewer hours	2000 viewer hours	5000 viewer hours
5 channels	10 channels	20 channels
1 TB storage	2 TB storage	3 TB storage

== Automatic content blocking ==
IBM Watson Media uses a copyright enforcement service provided by Vobile, which uses a proprietary fingerprinting system to automatically detect copyrighted content. This system has been known to generate false positives, blocking content that should fall under fair use, or which has been specifically licensed by the stream originator. In one such incident, the official livecast of the 2012 Hugo Award ceremony was terminated because it incorporated authorized clips of nominated television shows and movies, causing "a flood of livid Twitter messages". The following day, Ustream apologized for the incident and temporarily disabled automatic blocking while they adjusted the system to "better balance the needs of broadcasters, viewers, and copyright holders".
