= Band of Angels (investors) =

- Headquarters: Menlo Park, California
- Key people: Glen McLaughlin, Ian Sobieski, J. C. Hans Severiens, Wayne Tamarelli, Matthew Le Merle
- Website: www.bandangels.com

The Band of Angels was the first high technology specific angel investment group in the United States. Today the group remains very active with more than 160 members who invest their time and money into high tech startup companies. Band members have founded companies such as Cirrus Logic, Symantec, SunPower, National Semiconductor and Logitech, and have been senior executive officers at top Silicon Valley companies including Sun Microsystems, Hewlett Packard, Intel, 3Com and Intuit. Numerous articles have been written about the Band, appearing in periodicals such as The New York Times, The Washington Post, The Wall Street Journal, Upside, Red Herring, Der Spiegel, U.S. News & World Report, and Forbes. The Band has also been featured in two Harvard Business School case studies.

== Background ==
Band members invest in deals directly; there is no pooling of resources or voting. Since 1994, Band members have invested over $186 million into over 200 startup companies. Thirteen deals that presented to the Band as seed investments became public companies; these alone returned $240M in cash to Band members and 63 other companies in the Band's portfolio have been acquired for a gain.

In 2004 The Angel Capital Association established the Hans Severiens Award to recognize one person each year for outstanding accomplishments in the advancement of angel investing.

== See also ==
- Glen McLaughlin
