= Walton Elementary School =

Walton Elementary School may refer to:

Canada

- Walton Elementary School - Coquitlam, British Columbia - School District 43 Coquitlam

United States

- Maudrie M. Walton Elementary School - Fort Worth, Texas - Fort Worth Independent School District
- Walton Elementary School - Jackson, Mississippi - Jackson Public Schools
- William A. Walton Elementary School - Prince George County, Virginia - Prince George County Schools
