= Stop Six, Fort Worth, Texas =

Neighborhood in Fort Worth, Texas

Stop Six is a historically black neighborhood in southeast Fort Worth, Texas (USA) known for Dunbar High, whose basketball team won the high school state championship in 1993, 2002, and 2006. The neighborhood's name comes from the fact that it was once the sixth stop without an otherwise identifying landmark on the Northern Texas Traction Co. Interurban electric streetcar system that ran between Fort Worth and Dallas.

== History ==
Circa 1896, Amanda Davis, the first African-American to live in the area, paid a white man and obtained 1-acre (0.40 ha) of land. Davis built a cabin on her property. The area for a period was called Cowanville, after a couple who purchased a house in the area in 1902, Alonzo and Sarah Cowan. The Brockman and Stalcup families also became a part of the community. Marcia Melton of Texas Christian University Magazine characterized Stop Six in its initial period as "a community of small farms and homesteads".

By the 1920s the area's layout had developed.

== Cityscape ==
Berry Street, Miller Street, Rosedale Street, and Interstate 820 (Loop 820) form the boundaries of Stop Six. Polytechnic Heights is on the other side of Village Creek.

According to Melton, the community "still retains its rural flavor."

Bunche-Ellington, Carver Heights, Ramey Place, Stop Six Sunrise Edition, and Village Creek are communities within the Stop Six area.

== Education ==
Stop Six is part of the Fort Worth ISD and has several public schools. The district operates Dunbar High School, two middle schools, five elementary schools, and one alternative school. Stop Six's Maudrie M. Walton Elementary School was featured in the 2002 PBS documentary A Tale of Two Schools.

A school developed as Stop Six formed, and it was known initially as the Prairie Chapel Colored School. The Ebenezer Missionary Baptist Church supported the school in its earliest days, and it became a part of the Sagamore Hill School District. The school moved into a wooden building, as of 2008 next to Dunbar 6th Grade Center, in 1925, with the school district paying $5,000 to have the building constructed. Area residents spent $300 to fund the construction of the school, and the Rosenwald Foundation gave $1,000 more. In the 1930s, the area became a part of the Fort Worth school district. The building was later known as Dunbar Middle School. In February 2008, the former school became the Stop Six Heritage Center.

== Government and infrastructure ==
The JPS Health Center Stop Six - Walter B. Barbour of the JPS Health Network (Tarrant County Hospital District) is in Stop Six. It includes behavioral and dental services.

== Religion ==
In 1878 the Ebenezer Missionary Baptist Church was constructed.

== Notable residents ==
- Elmo Henderson (boxer)
- Robert Hughes (coach), boys' high school basketball's all-time winningest coach. Hughes led the "Flyin' Wildcats" of Dunbar High School to 30 district titles, 13 state finals appearances, and 3 state championships ('93,'03,'06) during his 32 years ('73-'05) at the school. Hughes was inducted into the Naismith Memorial Basketball Hall of Fame in 2017. He retired with a record of 1,333-262.
- Theresa A. Powell (1952-2023), academic administrator
- Brandon Tatum, conservative political commentator, former police officer, and former college football player for the Arizona Wildcats

== See also ==
- List of neighborhoods in Fort Worth, Texas
- History of the African Americans in Dallas-Fort Worth
