= Philipp, Mississippi =

- Unincorporated community
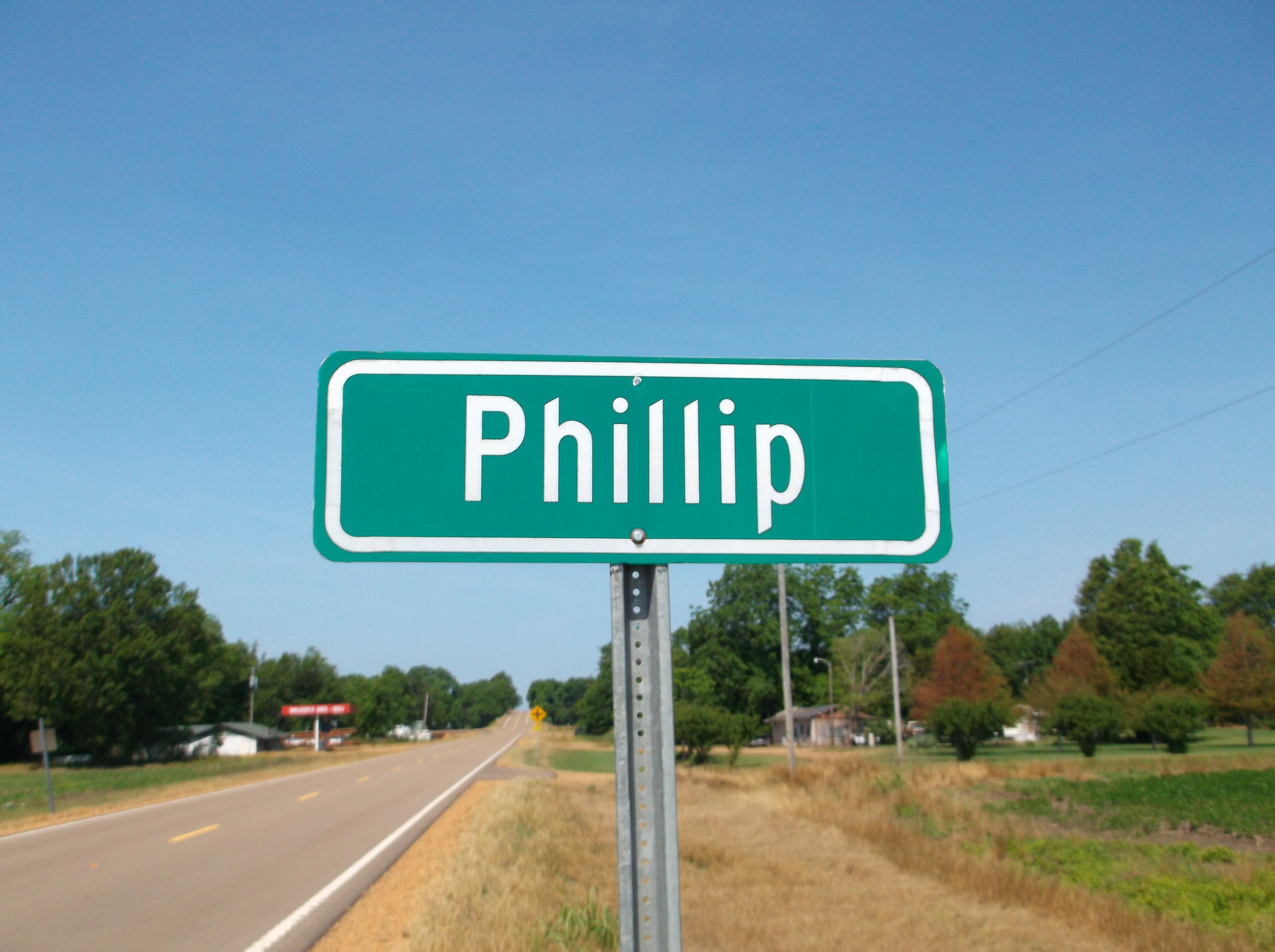

- Location within Mississippi Location within the United States
- Coordinates: 33°45′27″N 90°12′15″W
- Country: United States
- State: Mississippi
- Counties: Tallahatchie
- Elevation: 154 ft (47 m)
- Time zone: UTC-6 (Central (CST))
  - Summer (DST): UTC-5 (CDT)
- ZIP code: 38950
- Area code: 662
- GNIS feature ID: 675681

Philipp is an unincorporated community in southern Tallahatchie County, Mississippi, United States, along Mississippi Highway 8. Philipp is 6 miles (9.7 km) east of Minter City and 14 miles (23 km) west of Holcomb. Although Philipp is an unincorporated community, it has a post office with a ZIP code of 38950.

== History ==
The community was founded by Emanuel L. Philipp (later Governor of Wisconsin) when he was the manager of a lumber company from 1894 to 1902 in Mississippi.

John Lee Webb did construction projects in Philipp.

== Transportation ==
Amtrak’s City of New Orleans, which operates between New Orleans and Chicago, passes through the town on CN tracks, but makes no stop. The nearest station is located in Greenwood, 21 miles (34 km) to the south.

== Education ==
It is zoned to the West Tallahatchie School District. The local schools for West Tallahatchie are R. H. Bearden Elementary School and West Tallahatchie High School.

At one time the Philipp Consolidated School was located in the community. In 1957 the West Tallahatchie district announced that the property was for sale. At a later point, Black Bayou Elementary School in Glendora served southern parts of the West Tallahatchie district. The district decided to close Black Bayou in 1998.

West District Middle School (now Bearden) served as a middle school for the West Tallahatchie area.

Coahoma Community College is the designated community college for Tallahatchie County.

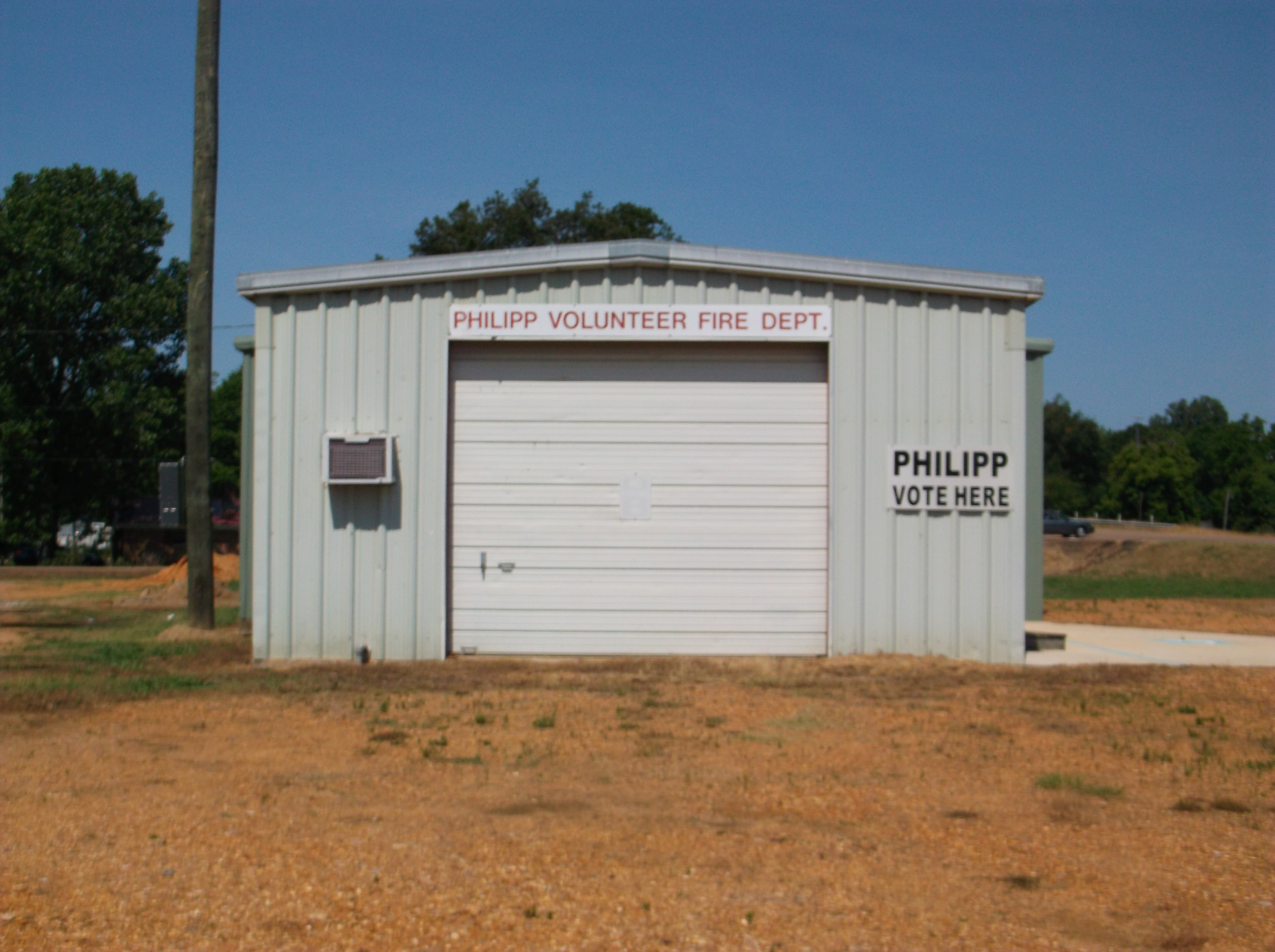
Philipp Volunteer Fire Department

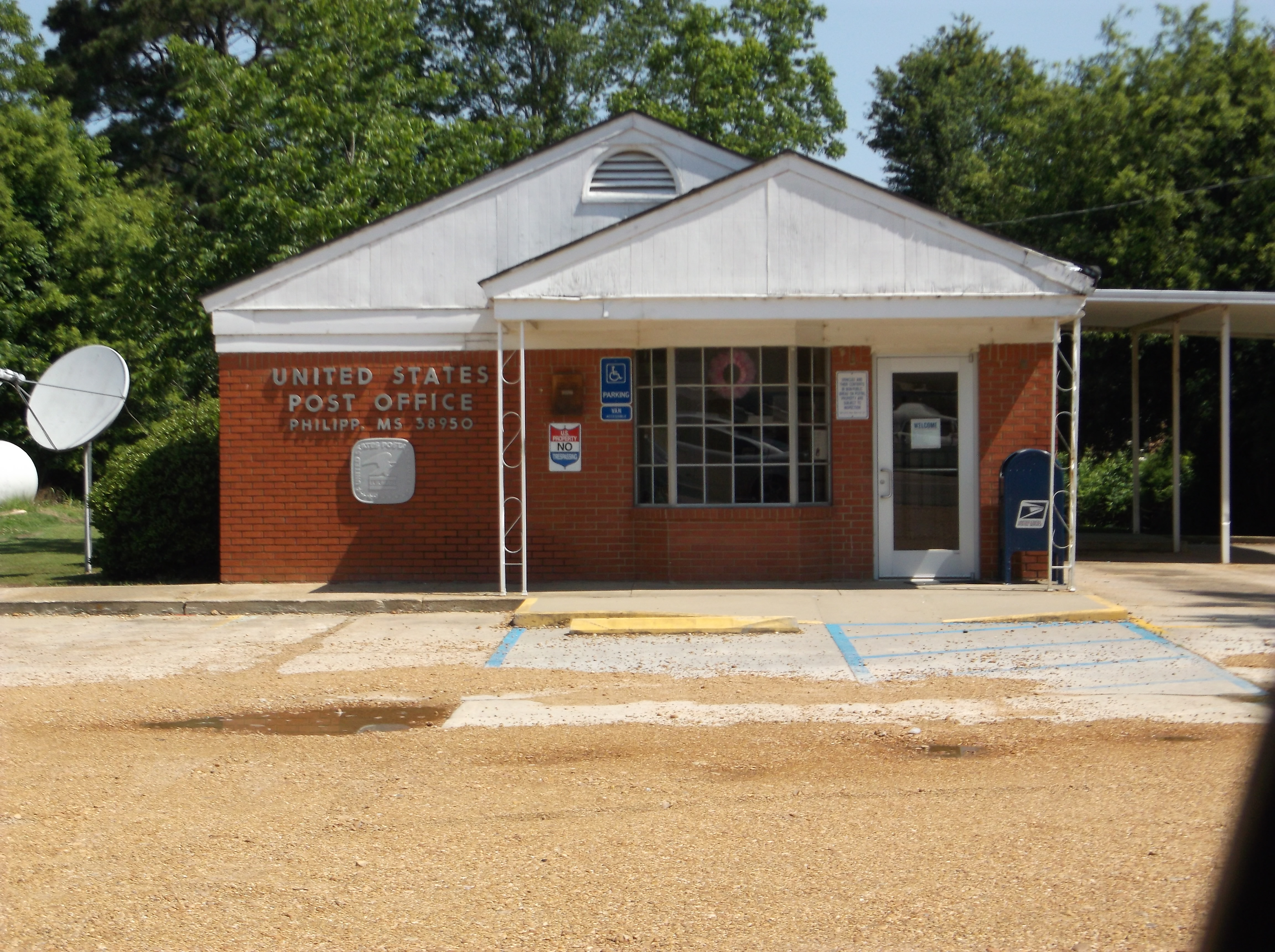
Philipp Post Office
