= Vance, Mississippi =

Unincorporated community in Mississippi, United States

- Unincorporated community
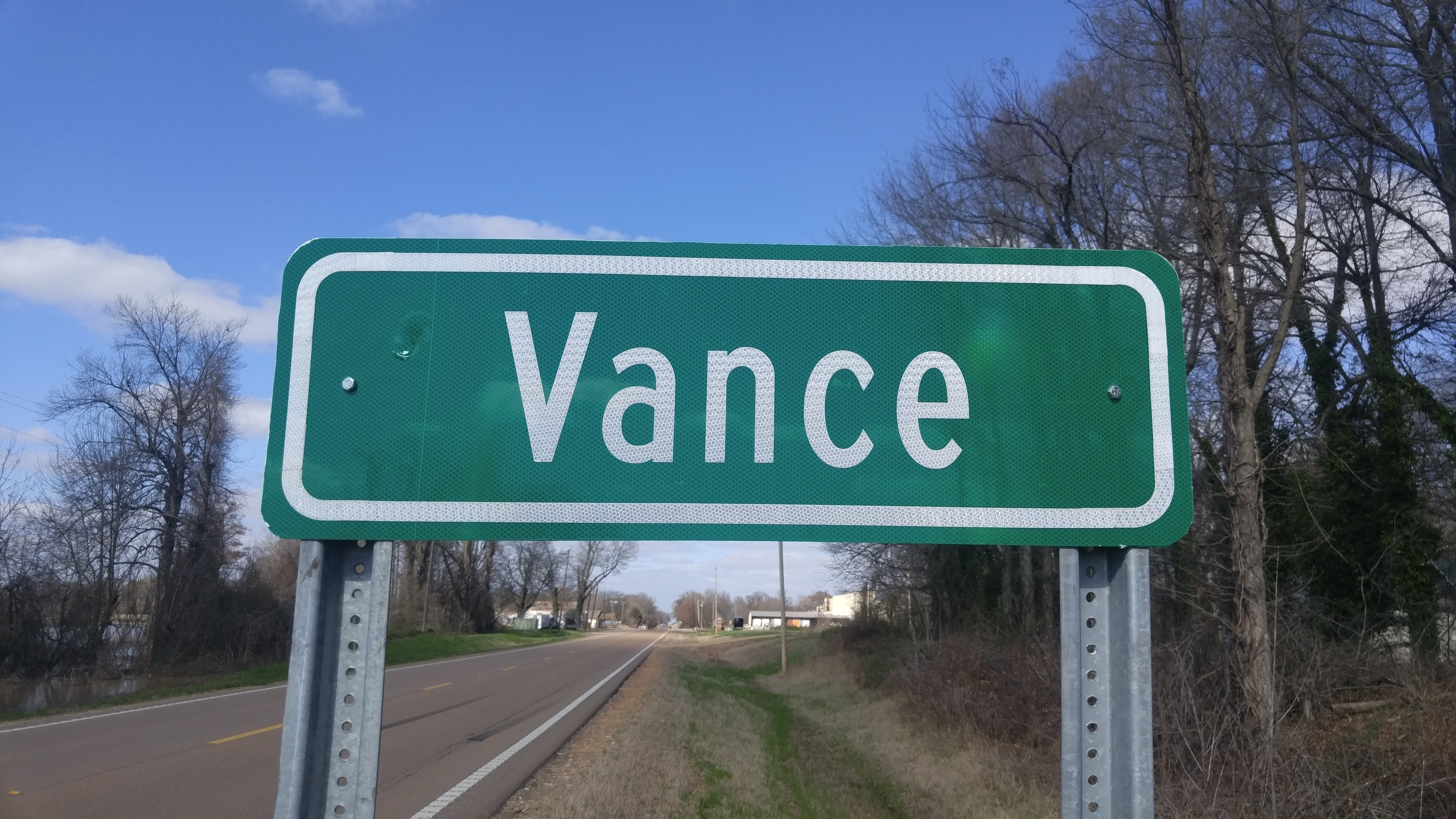
- Highway sign in Vance located on Mississippi Highway 3

- Location within Mississippi Location within the United States
- Coordinates: 34°04′22″N 90°21′03″W
- Country: United States
- State: Mississippi
- Counties: Quitman, Tallahatchie
- Elevation: 154 ft (47 m)
- Time zone: UTC-6 (Central (CST))
  - Summer (DST): UTC-5 (CDT)
- ZIP code: 38964
- Area code: 662
- GNIS feature ID: 679184

Vance is an unincorporated community in Quitman and Tallahatchie counties, Mississippi. Vance is located on Mississippi Highway 3 northeast of Tutwiler. Vance has a post office with ZIP code 38964.

== History ==
Vance is located on Cassidy's Bayou.

Vance once had a depot on the defunct Illinois Central Gulf Railroad. The community was incorporated in 1907.

== Education ==
The Tallatachie County section is in the West Tallahatchie School District. R. H. Bearden School and West Tallahatchie High School are the local schools.

The Quitman County section is in the Quitman County School District.

Coahoma Community College is the designated community college for Tallahatchie and Quitman counties.

== Notable people ==
- John Lee Hooker, Delta blues, musician; grew up in Vance. Mississippi Blues Trail marker #122 is erected there in his honor.
- Josephine Jue, first Asian-American woman to work for NASA
- Sunnyland Slim, Delta blues musician

== Gallery ==
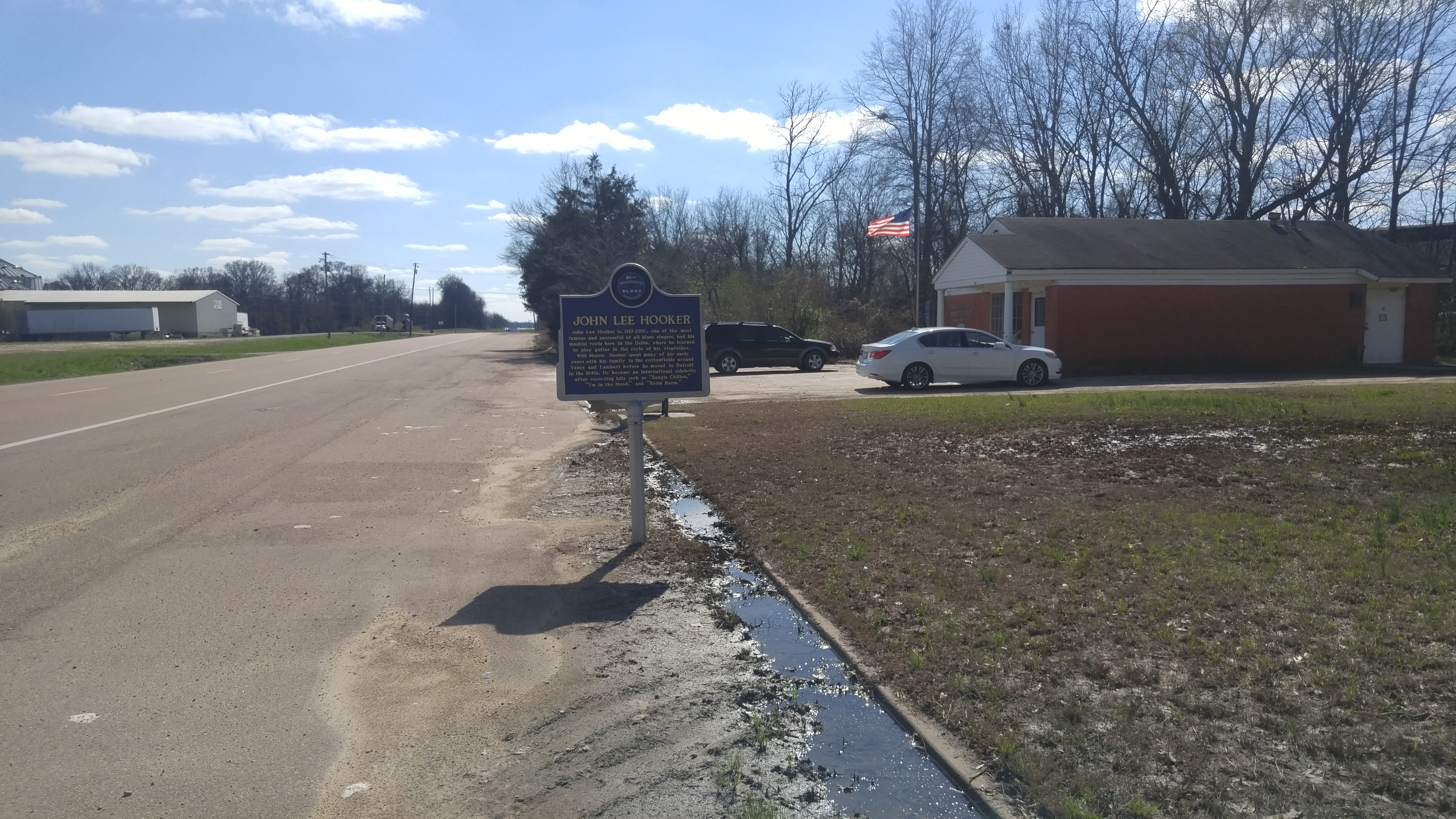
Mississippi Blues Trail marker for John Lee Hooker along Mississippi Highway 3

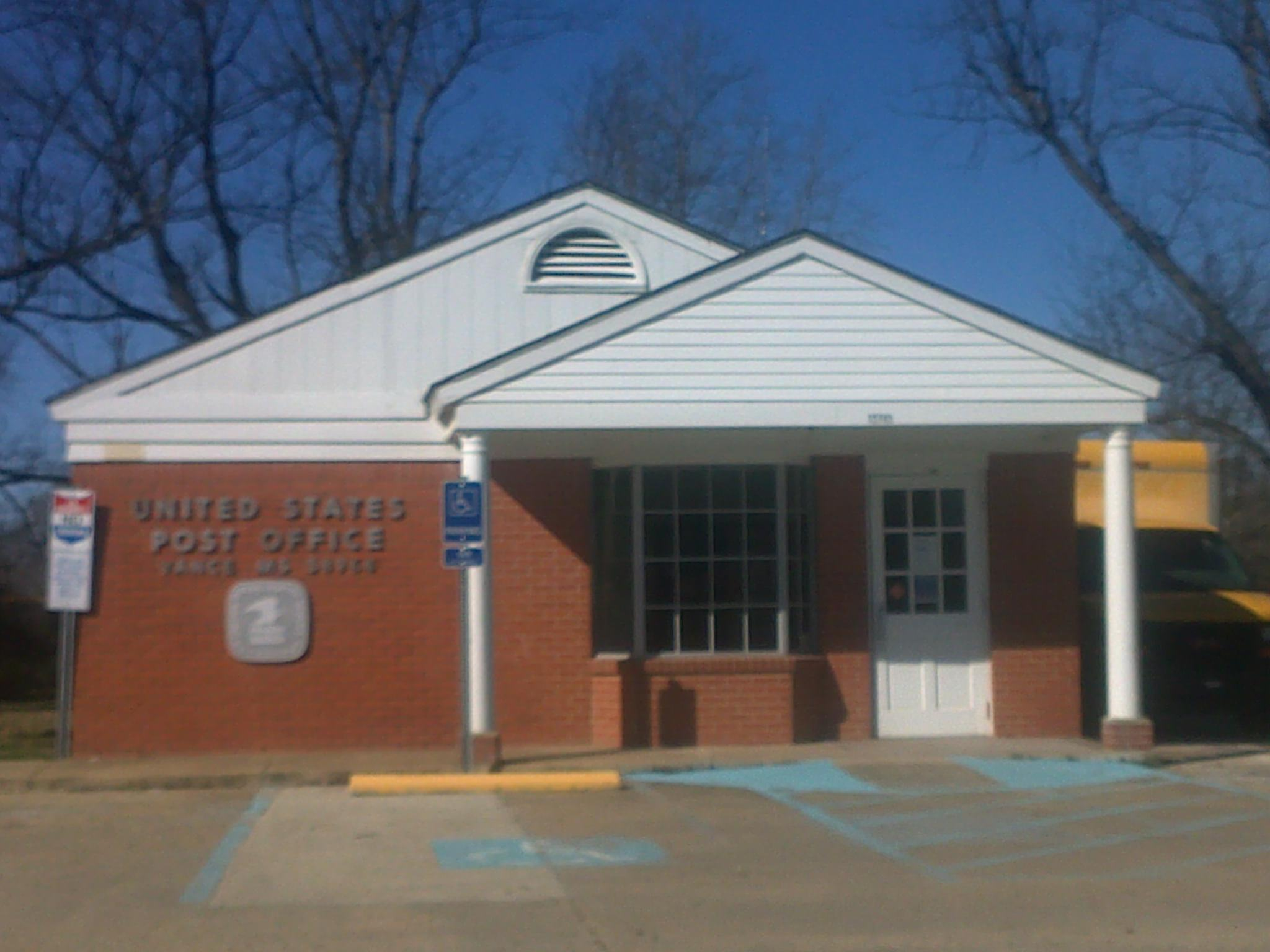
Vance Post Office

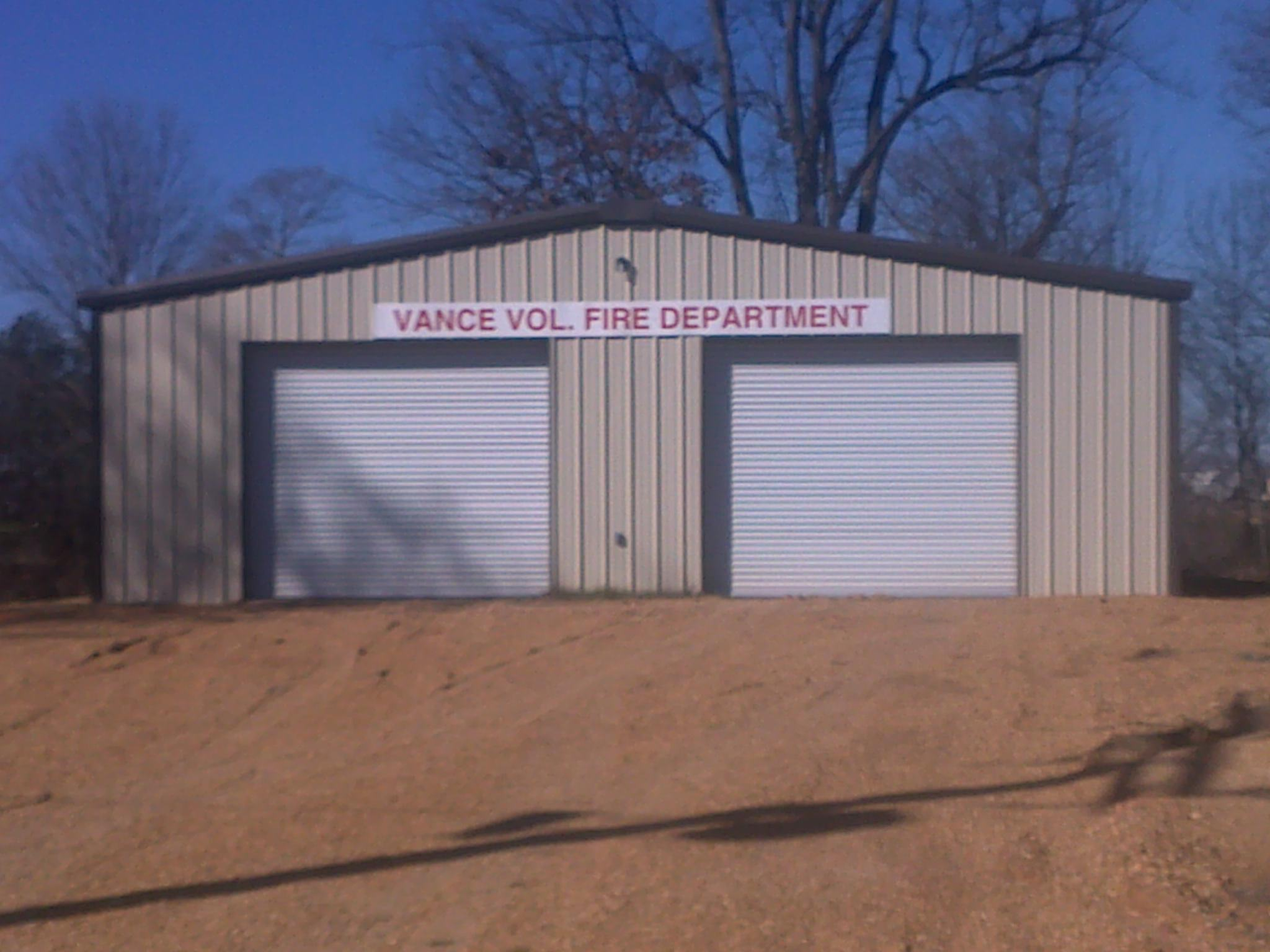
Vance Fire Department
