= Paul Laurence Dunbar High School (Fort Worth, Texas) =

Location
- 5700 Ramey Ave; Fort Worth, Texas 76112; United States; 32°43′34″N 97°14′40″W

Information
- School type: Public high school
- Established: 1953 (as high school)
- School district: Fort Worth Independent School District
- CEEB code: 442516
- Principal: Justin Edwards
- Teaching staff: 69.94 FTE (2017-18)
- Grades: 9–12
- Enrollment: 933 (2017-18)
- Student to teacher ratio: 13.34 (2017-18)
- Campus type: Urban
- Colours: Blue and white
- Slogan: “Excellence is the expectation, not the exception”
- Mascot: Wildcat
- Rival: Eastern Hills High School
- Website: Dunbar High School

Paul Laurence Dunbar High School is a comprehensive high school in the Stop Six neighborhood of Fort Worth, Texas, United States. Named for the dialectical poet Paul Laurence Dunbar, the school strives to educate the majority African-American community it serves.

== History ==
Formal education in the Stop Six area was established in 1907 with the Rustville School, which joined the Fort Worth Public School System in 1924. The school changed its name to Paul Laurence Dunbar School in 1938 and began adding high school classes in 1953, graduating its first class in 1957. From 1981 to approximately 2005 Dunbar hosted one of the district's academic magnet programs: the High School for Science and Engineering Professions (HSEP).

From 1973 to 2005, Dunbar High School's boys basketball team was coached by Robert Hughes, the most victorious boys high school basketball coach in US sports and Naismith Memorial Basketball Hall of Fame inductee.

== Campus ==
The current Dunbar High School building was completed in 1967 for $2.1 million.

Dunbar High School houses an Aviation Engineering, Aviation Technology, and Entrepreneur and Urban Development academic programs.

== Athletics ==
The Dunbar Wildcats actively compete in the following sports in the UIL:

- Boys Basketball - The boys basketball program has won three state championships (1993, 2003, 2006)
- Girls Basketball - The girls basketball program has won two state championships (2005 and 2007)
- Boys and Girls Track & Field - The boys program won one state title (1974) and the girls program won one state title (1991)
- Football
- Baseball
- Girls Volleyball
- Softball
- Wrestling
- Soccer

== Notable alumni ==
- Elijah Alexander — former professional football player
- Eric Bailey — former professional football player
- Victor Bailey — former professional football player
- Larry Braziel — former professional football player
- KB Brookins — poet and writer
- Julio Cedillo — film and television actor
- Saikat Chakrabarti — political activist
- Gary Collier — former professional basketball player
- Phillip Hunt — former professional football player
- Art Perkins — former professional football player
- Theresa A. Powell — academic administrator
- Charles Smith — professional basketball player
- Brandon Tatum, conservative political commentator, former police officer, and former college football player for the Arizona Wildcats
- Steve Taylor — former professional football player
- Mel Witt — former professional football player
