= Art Perkins =

American gridiron football player (born 1940)

No. 37, 35, 24
- Position: Fullback

Personal information
- Born: May 1, 1940 (age 86); Fort Worth, Texas, U.S.
- Listed height: 6 ft 0 in (1.83 m)
- Listed weight: 225 lb (102 kg)

Career information
- High school: Dunbar (Fort Worth)
- College: North Texas State
- NFL draft: 1962: 4th round, 44th overall pick
- AFL draft: 1962: 18th round, 143rd overall pick

Career history

Playing
- Los Angeles Rams (1962–1963); Winnipeg Blue Bombers (1964–1966); Edmonton Eskimos (1967–1969); Buffalo Bills (1970)*
- * Offseason or practice squad member only

Coaching
- Los Angeles Mustangs (1972–1973) Offensive coordinator; Compton (1974–1977) Assistant coach; Compton (1978–1988) Head coach; Compton (1993–1994) Co-head coach

Career NFL statistics
- Rushing yards: 251
- Rushing average: 3
- Receptions: 22
- Receiving yards: 144
- Total touchdowns: 6
- Stats at Pro Football Reference

Head coaching record
- Career: 40–85–4 (.326)

Arthur Ray Perkins (born May 1, 1940) is an American former gridiron football player and coach. He played college football for North Texas State and professionally for the Los Angeles Rams of the National Football League (NFL) and the Winnipeg Blue Bombers and Edmonton Eskimos of the Canadian Football League (CFL).

== Early life ==
A native of Fort Worth, Texas, Perkins attended Dunbar High School in that city. He played football, basketball, baseball, and competed in the shot put at Dunbar High. He then played college football at North Texas State in Denton, Texas. In 1958, Perkins and Billy Christie became the first African-American athletes to integrate North Texas State on four-year athletic scholarships. He was known by the nickname "Pearly".

== Professional football ==
Perkins was drafted by the Los Angeles Rams in the fourth round with the 44th pick in the 1962 NFL draft. He played for the Rams during the 1962 and 1963 seasons, appearing in 26 NFL games. In his second year with the Rams, he was used principally as a blocking back.

Perkins later played in the Canadian Football League for the Winnipeg Blue Bombers (1964–1966), and Edmonton Eskimos (1967–1969). He appeared in 74 CFL games, tallying 2,961 yards, 1,386 receiving yards, and scoring 29 touchdowns. He was known as an excellent receiver who rarely missed a pass, catching 18 of 18 one year and 37 of 37 another.

== Coaching career ==
In 1972, Perkins returned to Los Angeles as offensive coordinator for the Los Angeles Mustangs, a semiprofessional football team. After two seasons with the Mustangs, he was hired as an assistant football coach at Compton College under head coach Aaron Youngblood. Perkins succeeded Youngblood as Compton's head coach in 1978.

== Head coaching record ==
Year	Team	Overall	Conference	Standing	Bowl/playoffs
Compton Tartars (Western State Conference) (1978)
1978	Compton	3–7	0–7	8th	
1979	Compton	3–6–1	2–5	T–7th	
1980	Compton	8–1–1	6–1–1	2nd	
Compton Tartars (Southern California Conference) (1981–1982)
1981	Compton	7–3	5–1	2nd	
1982	Compton	4–6	3–3	T–3rd	
Compton Tartars (South Coast Conference) (1983)
1983	Compton	0–10	0–6	7th	
Compton Tartars (Western State Conference) (1984–1985)
1984	Compton	0–9	0–7	8th	
1985	Compton	4–6	4–3	T–3rd	
Compton Tartars (South Coast Conference) (1986–1987)
1986	Compton	1–9	1–6	T–7th	
1987	Compton	2–7–1	0–6–1	8th	
Compton Tartars (Western State Conference) (1988)
1988	Compton	3–7	3–6	4th (Southern)	
Compton Tartars (Western State Conference) (1993–1994)
1993	Compton	2–8	2–7 / 1–4	5th (Northern)	
1994	Compton	3–6–1	2–6–1 / 1–4–1	7th (Southern)	
Compton:		40–85–4	28–64–3		
Total:		40–85–4			
