= Brazil, Mississippi =

- Unincorporated community
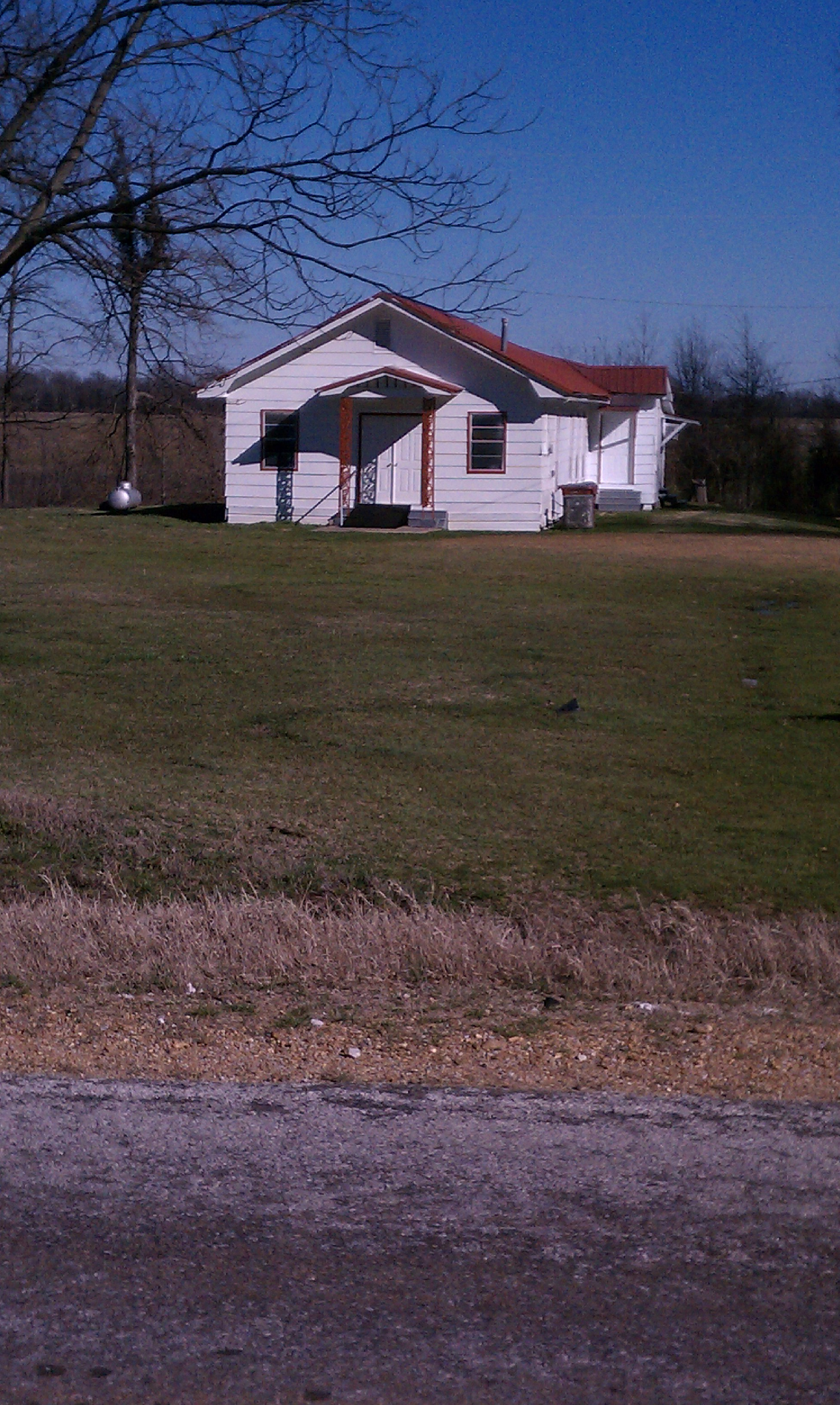
- True Vine Baptist Church in Brazil

- Location within Mississippi Location within the United States
- Coordinates: 34°01′35″N 90°16′50″W
- Country: United States
- State: Mississippi
- County: Tallahatchie
- Elevation: 154 ft (47 m)
- Time zone: UTC-6 (Central (CST))
  - Summer (DST): UTC-5 (CDT)
- ZIP code: 38963
- Area code: 662
- GNIS feature ID: 667534

Brazil is an unincorporated community in Tallahatchie County, Mississippi. Brazil is on Mississippi Highway 321 approximately 8 miles (13 km) north of Webb and 12 miles (19 km) south of Lambert.

The community is also known as Lay and Stover.

== Transportation ==
Amtrak’s City of New Orleans, which operates between New Orleans and Chicago, passes through the town on CN tracks, but makes no stop. The nearest station is located in Marks, 18 miles (29 km) to the north.

== Education ==
Brazil is in the West Tallahatchie School District. R. H. Bearden School and West Tallahatchie High School are the local schools.

It was previously a part of the Brazil Consolidated School District. Brazil formerly had its own school, with the final building built for $50,000 in 1936. In the 1940s, the district made plans to build an expansion. The previous Brazil school was destroyed by a fire. Due to underenrollment, as the school had 40 students registered in 1965, it was closed that year. and the building put up for sale by the school district.

Coahoma Community College is the designated community college.
