= West Tallahatchie High School =

School in Mississippi, United States

Location
- 2104 High School Road; Webb, Mississippi 38966; United States
- 33°56′55″N 90°21′07″W

Information
- Type: Public high school
- School district: West Tallahatchie School District
- Superintendent: Tony Young
- Principal: Damian Collins
- Teaching staff: 24.98 (FTE)
- Grades: 7–12
- Enrollment: 291 (2023–2024)
- Student to teacher ratio: 11.65
- Colors: Green and white
- Team name: Mighty Choctaws
- Website: www.wtsdschools.org

West Tallahatchie High School (WTHS) is a public high school in unincorporated Tallahatchie County, Mississippi, near Webb. A part of the West Tallahatchie School District, its nickname is "West Tally".

In addition to Webb, the district also serves the communities of Tutwiler, Sumner, and Glendora. Additionally, it includes the unincorporated areas of Brazil, Philipp, and Vance. The parts of the Minter City area in Tallahatchie County are in the West Tallahatchie district.

Students matriculate from R. H. Bearden Elementary School.

== History ==
Groundbreaking for the new school, which was to include an apartment block and two houses to serve as residences for teachers, was held on June 24, 1949. Initially the cost was to be $500,000. It had a price tag of $650,000. Construction for a "West Tallahatchie high school district building" consolidating smaller schools was announced in 1949. It combined the Webb-Swan Lake, Tutwiler, and Sumner high schools. At the time, the Blue Lake, Brazil, Glendora, and Philipp areas were in separate school districts, paying tuition to attend West Tallahatchie High.

In 1988 it had grades 9-12 and its anticipated 1988 enrollment was 430-450 students. For years it operates as an 8-12 school until it became 7–12 in 1997, with 7th graders coming from R.H. Bearden School (formerly West District Middle School). The district added eight classrooms to the northern part of the building so it can hold 7th graders. Two restrooms were also part of the addition, which had a total of 7,500 square feet (700 m^{2}) of space.

In November 1997 it had 513 students.

Otis Anthony Sr. served as principal for two years.

== Campus ==
It is on U.S. Highway 49 East, between Webb and Sumner.
