= James Ozro Day =

Mississippi lawyer, district attorney, judge and state senator

James Ozro Day (November 30, 1888–?) was an American lawyer, farmer, judge, and district attorney who served in the Mississippi Senate.

Day was born in Decatur, Mississippi. He lived in Tutwiler, Mississippi. He served in the military during World War I. He married. He was a Baptist and a member of the masons.

Day was a circuit judge in 1933. He was United States District Attorney for the Northern District of Mississippi from 1942 to 1945. He was a member of the Lions, Masons, and American Legion.

His brother Carl Day was a doctor and philanthropist.
