= Josephine Jue =

Chinese-American mathematician and programmer

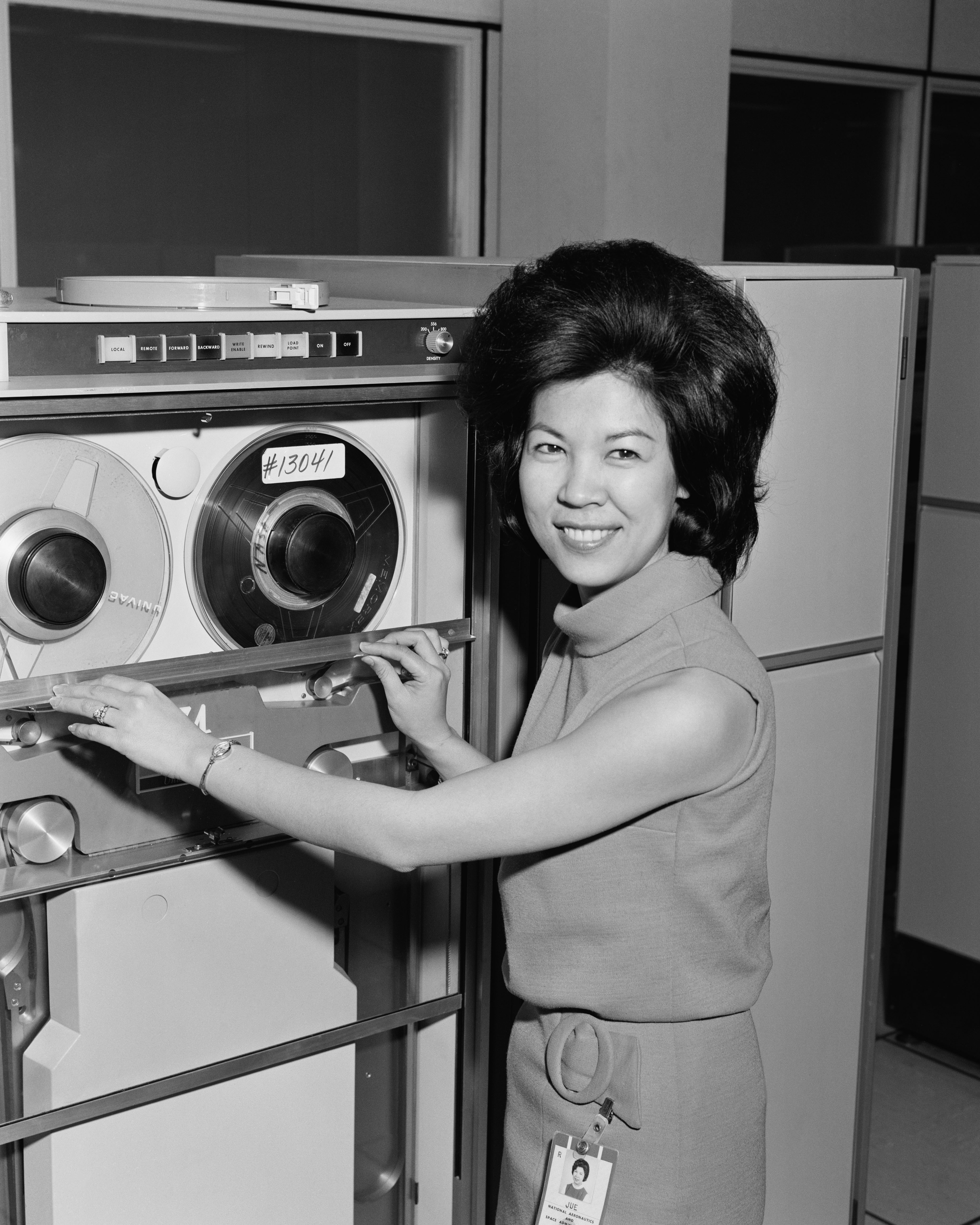
NASA picture of Josephine Jue

Josephine Jue (born 1946) is a Chinese-American computer programmer and mathematician, who is notably recognised as the first Asian-American woman to work for her division at NASA, where she worked for 34 years. Jue contributed significantly to the U.S. human spaceflight programs that include Apollo and the Space Shuttle. Her focus included software and data system development across NASA divisions. Jue is a founding member of the Chinese Baptist Church of Houston, Texas.

== Early life ==
Jue was born in Vance, Mississippi, into a Mississippi Delta Chinese family, operating a grocery store in Mississippi Delta. When she was three months old, her parents moved to Houston, Texas. There, they ran two grocery stores which Jue worked at since young. Through working as a cashier, Jue became exposed to and showcased an affinity for mathematics. As a high schooler, Jue enrolled in all the mathematics classes her school offered, including algebra, geometry, infinite series, and trigonometry, which led to her decision to go to the University of Houston, from which she received a bachelor's degree in mathematics and minored in chemistry In college, apart from her obligatory coursework, Jue took two programming classes: in FORTRAN (FORmula TRANslator) and in MAD (Michigan Algorithm Decoder), which exposed her to computing.

== Work for NASA ==
=== Early Computational Work (1960s–1970s) ===
In 1963, Jue joined NASA's Computation and Analysis Division in the Engineering and Development Directorate, which handled computation and data reduction for the entire Manned Spacecraft Center. With the Manned Spacecraft Center under construction, Jue began working at one of 14 temporary sites at the University of Houston, which housed NASA's digital computers and would become the site for KUHT, Houston's PBS station. Initially hired as a mathematician, her job title changed over time to aerospace technologist and her duties expanded to require proficiency in mathematical modules of scientific programming, as well as machine and Fortran languages for IBM's computers. Serving as one of eighty computer programmers and analysts in the division, she was one of the few women and the sole Asian-American woman. Her concentration within the Data Systems Development Branch included business programming. Working with the computer IBM 1401, Jue was in charge of numerous tasks, ranging from contract management to data analysis. There, she studied programming in COBOL (Common Business Oriented Language) and worked on the Gemini and Apollo programs.

=== Space Shuttle Software and HAL/S (1970s–1980s) ===
In 1975, Jue joined NASA's Spacecraft Software Division, focusing on the development and testing of Shuttle software. Transitioning out of writing computer programs as NASA began to contract such work out, she simultaneously served as a contract monitor, chaired the HAL/S Language Definition and User Coordination Group, and managed operations in the Software Development Laboratory (SDL), one of several facilities that tested Shuttle software. As chair of the HAL/S Language Definition and User Coordination Group, she closely monitored the development of software for the Shuttle's flight software and approved any modifications to HAL/S. As a contract monitor, she evaluated and graded tender-winners such as IBM and Intermetrics, reviewing their performance and ability to meet the technical requirements as required by NASA.

Out of 4,000 positions at the center she worked at, only 170 of them were granted to women. Reflecting on the work environment at the JSC, Jue commented that she nonetheless felt accepted by the management, and was even on the Suggestions Award Committee. In 1975, she served as a member of the Federal Women's Program, which was an initiative advancing women beyond clerical jobs. During her time there, the brochure "Minority profiles" was created, in which Jue appeared as one of two recognised Asian women.

From 1977 to 1980, Jue oversaw the continual evaluation and testing of in-flight simulator software for STS-1, the first National Space Transportation System mission and the first test flight of the Space Shuttle in space.

=== Subsequent Roles at NASA (1980s–1990s) ===
In February 1982, after two successful Shuttle missions, Jue became the operations manager for the new Software Production Facility (SPF), which continued to develop, verify, and produce IBM's PCs' flight software for upcoming Shuttle missions, and was promoted to chief of the service center in 1984. In 1985, Jue transferred to the Data Processing Systems Division, becoming the Johnson Space Center's (JSC) User Workstation Manager, where she was responsible for determining the user requirements and overseeing the procurement, set-up, maintenance, training and troubleshooting for personal computer workstations across the JSC.

In 1993, Jue moved to NASA's Space Station Program Office in the brand-new home of the expanding Astronaut Office. Taking on the role as chief for the office, she received a promotion to a GS-15, the top of the pay scale for civil servants. There, she took on responsibilities similar to her previous ones in the JSC of managing the personal computer workstations and also traveled to Japan to speak with the National Space Development Agency of Japan about their involvement in the International Space Station.

In 1997, Jue, aged 51, retired from NASA after being offered a buyout.

== Personal life ==
Jue has four siblings. She got married on August 15, 1965. Jue has three children. She attends the Chinese Baptist Church in Houston, Texas. Jue was also involved with community organisations like the Chinese Professional Club and the National Association of Chinese Americans. As of 2023, Jue participated in the committee that helped bring about the 70th reunion of the Chinese Baptist Church, and continues to meet with NASA personnel for discussions on current affairs.
