= A Tale of Two Schools =

2003 American documentary film

A Tale of Two Schools is a documentary program produced by PBS. An hour in length, it is a part of the "Reading Rockets" series by WETA-TV. Noel Gunther and Christian Lindstrom are the producers, and Morgan Freeman is the narrator. It was first aired on October 6, 2003.

It documents reading programs at Maudrie M. Walton Elementary School in Fort Worth, Texas and R. H. Bearden Elementary School in Tallahatchie County, Mississippi, with the filming time in the period from fall 2000 to spring 2001.

The film follows one particular student per school, with a first grade class and second grade class at Walton and Bearden, respectively. It also documents how the superintendent of the West Tallahatchie School District, which operates Bearden, faced marital issues and encountered increasing issues with his health due to his devotion.

== Reception ==
Marjorie Coeyman of the Christian Science Monitor states that the program shows "a human face" on the effort to improve reading skills in low income American classrooms and that "refusal to point fingers or pretend the parents are not trying - even when they fail" is "one of the best things about this show".
