= Robert Hughes (basketball) =

American basketball player-coach (1928–2024)

Personal information
- Born: May 15, 1928 Bristow, Oklahoma, U.S.
- Died: June 11, 2024 (aged 96) Fort Worth, Texas, U.S.
- Coaching career: 1958–2005

Career history

Coaching
- 1958–1973: I.M. Terrell HS
- 1973–2005: Dunbar HS

Career highlights
- 5× Texas State champion (1963, 1965, 1967, 1993, 2003); Texas Basketball Hall of Fame inductee (2003); High School Basketball Hall of Fame inductee (2003); NHSCA National High School Coach of the Year (2003); Morgan Wootten Lifetime Achievement Award (2010); Texas Black Sports Hall of Fame (2010)

Career coaching record
- PVIL: 373–84 (.816)
- UIL: 960–163 (.855)
- Basketball Hall of Fame

Robert Hughes Sr. (May 15, 1928 – June 11, 2024) was an American high school basketball coach. Hughes was the United States' all-time winningest high school basketball coach from February 11, 2003, to December 7, 2010, and as of June 2024, is the most successful boys' high school basketball coach in the United States with 1,333 wins. He was passed in wins by Leta Andrews of Granbury High School in Granbury, Texas, who compiled a national record 1,416 career victories in girls' high school basketball before retiring in 2014.

== Early life ==
Hughes joined the Army after high school. At 6 ft 6 in (1.98 m), he was recruited for a special unit that just played basketball; it was the first integrated team Hughes ever played on. When he left the Army, Texas Southern University offered him a basketball scholarship. Playing for coach Edward H. Adams, Hughes was an All-American at Southern. He started playing for the barnstorming Harlem Magicians in 1954, and was selected by the Boston Celtics as a supplemental draft pick in the 1955 NBA draft, but he did not make the team. Hughes returned to the Magicians in 1955, and met his wife, Jacquelyne Johnson, while playing in a tournament in Memphis, but a ruptured Achilles tendon later that season forced him to give up playing basketball. He returned home to Oklahoma and attended the University of Tulsa, graduating in 1957.

== Coaching career ==
Hughes was hired by Douglas Aircraft as a mechanic after graduating from Tulsa, and worked there until his former coach at Texas Southern called to ask if Hughes had ever considered coaching. Hughes was not initially interested, but Adams persisted and Hughes was hired at I. M. Terrell High School, in Fort Worth, Texas (an all-black high school) during segregation. Hughes led Terrell to three PVIL state championships and one runner up in the five years from 1963 to 1967.

After segregation ended and I. M. Terrell was shut down in 1973, Hughes began coaching at Dunbar High School in the Fort Worth Independent School District. At Dunbar, Hughes won two state titles, finished as state runner-up three times, and took the team to the final four 12 times between 1977 and 2003, including ten final fours in the 17-year run between 1977 and 1993. In 32 seasons at Dunbar, Hughes had only one assistant coach, Leondas Rambo, who retired with Hughes in 2005.

Between Terrell and Dunbar combined, Hughes won five state basketball titles, and retired in 2005 as the then all-time winningest high school basketball coach, passing Morgan Wootten in 2003. "If you can't work hard and put out the best, you probably need to go home to your mama," Hughes was known for telling his players.

== Personal life ==
Hughes's wife of 57 years, Jacquelyne Sue Johnson Hughes, died on July 1, 2014.

Hughes's son, Robert Hughes Jr., took over head coaching duties at Dunbar after Hughes Sr. retired in 2005, and as of June 2024, is the coach at Dunbar High School. He has two daughters. One, Carlye J. Hughes, was ordained the 11th Episcopal Bishop of Newark in September 2018. Another daughter, Robin L. Hughes, was named dean of Southern Illinois University Edwardsville School of Education, Health and Human Behavior in July 2019.

Hughes resided in the Stop Six neighborhood of southeast Fort Worth. He died in Fort Worth on June 11, 2024, at the age of 96.

== Halls of fame and awards ==
Hughes was elected to the Naismith Memorial Basketball Hall of Fame on March 31, 2017. Additional halls of fame include: Texas Basketball Hall of Fame (1993), High School Basketball Hall of Fame (2003), Texas Sports Hall of Fame (2003) and the Texas Black Sports Hall of Fame (2013).

Hughes was selected as the NHSCA National High School Coach of the Year in 2003, and received the Morgan Wootten Lifetime Achievement Award by the Naismith Memorial Basketball Hall of Fame in 2010.

== Popular culture ==
In anticipation of Hughes's induction into the Naismith Memorial Basketball Hall of Fame, filmmaker and former Dunbar basketball player, Mike Byars, created a feature-length documentary 5700 Ramey Ave: The Story of Robert Hughes to chronicle Hughes's career.
