= R. H. Bearden Elementary School =

Public school in Mississippi, United States

Coordinates: 33°57′43″N 90°22′28″W

Information
- School district: West Tallahatchie School District

R. H. Bearden Elementary School is a public elementary school in unincorporated Tallahatchie County, Mississippi, near Sumner. It is a part of the West Tallahatchie School District.

In addition to Sumner, the district also serves the communities of Tutwiler, Webb, and Glendora. Additionally it includes the unincorporated areas of Brazil, Philipp, and Vance. The parts of the Mintner City area in Tallahatchie County are in the West Tallahatchie district. The school is named in honor of Rogers H. Bearden, a longtime educator and administrator in the West Tallahatchie School District.

Students matriculate to West Tallahatchie High School.

== History ==
It was previously the "West District School", or West District Middle School, and was grade 6-8. Prior to 1988 it only had middle school levels. Beginning in 1988 it began serving grades 3-8 and served Sumner and Webb for the upper elementary grades. By 1995 its name changed from West District Middle School to Bearden School. In July 1997 the school had about 700 students, and in November 1997 it had 576 students. That year the district closed Sumner Elementary and moved its remaining students to Bearden, and in turn moved 7th grade students to West Tallahatchie High. The district planned to build 10 new classrooms at Bearden to accommodate more students.

In 2003 it was featured in the PBS documentary A Tale of Two Schools which focused on its methods of teaching reading, along with those of Maudrie M. Walton Elementary School in Fort Worth, Texas.
