= Anne Brooks =

American physician

Anne Brooks SNJM
- Born: 1938 (age 87–88); Detroit, Michigan
- Education: Barry University; Michigan State University College of Osteopathic Medicine
- Occupations: Physician, Healthcare executive
- Employer: Tutwiler Clinic

Anne Brooks, SNJM (born 1938) is an American Roman Catholic religious sister and retired family physician who is CEO of Tutwiler Clinic, a non-profit entity located in Tutwiler, Tallahatchie County in the Mississippi Delta. Tutwiler Clinic provides health services to the poor, medically under-served, largely African-American community.

== Early years ==
Born in Washington, D.C. in 1938, she was an only child. Her mother became alcoholic and her father was a Navy captain. When she was 10, her parents divorced. Because of his tours at sea, her father sent her to a Roman Catholic boarding school in Key West, Florida. She reportedly decided at age 11, to become a nun.

Brooks joined the Sisters of the Holy Names of Jesus and Mary in 1955 at the age of 17. That same year, Brooks was diagnosed with rheumatoid arthritis. She was told that she would be on crutches or in a wheelchair the rest of her life. She attended Barry University in Miami, Florida and graduated with a Bachelor of Science in elementary education. She started her career teaching at Catholic elementary parochial schools in Florida. She also volunteered at drug rehabilitation clinics and abused women centers, among other places.

== Medical school ==
While volunteering at a free clinic in 1972, she met Dr. John Upledger, who treated her for her arthritis. Inspired by Dr. Upledger, and with his encouragement, at the age of 40 Brooks started medical school at Michigan State University College of Osteopathic Medicine, graduating with her medical degree in 1982.

During her fourth year of medical studies, Brooks took a month off and traveled to Georgia, Louisiana, Florida, and Mississippi. She said about this travel, "there were a couple of things I wanted to know. One of them was how as a sister, with a vow of poverty, how do I run a practice?"

After seeing much rural poverty, she returned to Michigan and wrote letters to towns in Mississippi that might need a doctor. Tutwiler was the only town that answered Brooks. Brooks moved to Tutwiler and, in the summer of 1983, she opened the Tutwiler Medical Clinic.

== Tutwiler Clinic ==
The clinic accepts all patients, regardless of their ability to pay. The clinic does not have a fixed budget and more than 75% of its operating funds come from individual donations. The clinic provides medical, counseling, dental, optical, podiatry, education, and outreach services.

Over two thirds of the clinic's patients do not have any type of public or private insurance coverage. The median household income in the county is $18,800 per year. Seventy percent of patients do not have any way of paying for their care.

== Other ==
From 2000 to 2002, Brooks served as Chief of Staff at Northwest Mississippi Regional Medical Center, a 195-bed hospital in Clarksdale, Mississippi.

== Awards ==
- Brooks was awarded an honorary degree from Michigan State University.
- MSU also presented her with the MSU Distinguished Alumni Award.
- She has received the Martin Luther King Jr. Award from the International Fellowship of Reconciliation
- She was given the Outstanding Commitment and Devotion to Serving Humanity Award from the Tallahatchie Development League.
- On March 12, 2005, Brooks received the American Medical Association Foundation's 2005 Pride in the Profession Award in Washington, D.C.
- In 2009, she was a runner-up for the J.H. Kanter Prize.
- In 2007, Sister Brooks received the Mississippi State Medical Association's (MSMA) Community Service Award which recognizes an individual physician for outstanding contributions to the betterment of life in his or her community.
