= Theresa A. Powell =

American academic administrator

- Powell in 2022
- Born: February 10, 1952; Fort Worth, Texas, U.S.
- Died: January 2, 2023 (aged 70); Texas, U.S.

Academic background
- Education: University of Pennsylvania; Texas Christian University; Ohio State University

Academic work
- Discipline: Educational administration
- Institutions: Western Michigan University; Temple University

Theresa A. Powell (February 10, 1952 – January 2, 2023) was an American academic administrator who served as the vice president for student affairs at Temple University and Western Michigan University. She was the first African American woman president of the National Association of Student Personnel Administrators.

== Life ==
Powell was born on February 10, 1952, in Fort Worth, Texas. She was raised in Stop Six, Fort Worth, Texas where her family attended Ebenezer Missionary Baptist Church. She graduated from Paul Laurence Dunbar High School in 1970. Powell earned a bachelor's degree in sociology from the University of Pennsylvania. She earned a master's degree in student personnel services from Texas Christian University. She completed a doctorate in educational administration at the Ohio State University.

Powell was a tenured professor and the vice president for student affairs at Western Michigan University. She joined Temple University in 2002 as its vice president for student affairs. She served as the president of the National Association of Student Personnel Administrators from 2000-2001. She was the first African American woman to serve in that role.

Powell died on January 2, 2023, in Texas.
