= Elmo Henderson =

American boxer

- Born: Albert Carl Henderson; April 8, 1935 (age 91); Corpus Christi, Texas
- Other names: Elmo, Tex
- Occupation: Boxer
- Known for: Claiming he knocked out Muhammad Ali in an exhibition fight

Elmo Henderson (born April 8, 1935) is an American former boxer from Texas. Despite his dubious claim of a 1972 win against Muhammad Ali in an exhibition match in San Antonio, Texas, he did not become particularly well known in the boxing community; John Spong of the Texas Monthly said that the match was the "shot not heard round the world". However, people who attended the exhibition say Elmo Henderson did not defeat Ali, and newspaper reports after the exhibition made no mention of Ali losing. After the match, Henderson became a part of George Foreman's Rumble in the Jungle event in Zaire and won a libel suit against Norman Mailer and Playboy. As of 2003, Henderson was a homeless man in Austin, Texas.

== History ==
Henderson, a high school dropout from Stop Six, Fort Worth, first began boxing in 1954 and frequented events in the Dallas-Fort Worth Metroplex. He went to prison in Huntsville, Texas in 1961 after stealing a television from a truck. In 1964, Henderson won the Texas state boxing title by defeating Benny Bowser, a boxer from Austin, Texas, in the second round of the competition. In the following year, Henderson again faced Bowser and lost the title to him after the judges made a split decision to grant the title to Bowser. In 1967 Henderson had a series of fights; in August of that year the California Athletic Commission asked Henderson to take an examination of his brain so doctors could determine if he had received brain damage. Henderson did not take the examination and instead went to New Zealand to match against Bobby Dunlop; he defeated Dunlop in the New Zealand match, and then Dunlop defeated Henderson in a rematch in Sydney, Australia three months later. The California Athletic Commission suspended Henderson's state boxing license after it learned of the matches in Australasia. In 1968, police from Fort Worth found marijuana in Henderson's possession, and he briefly returned to prison. In 1972 Nevada suspended Henderson's boxing license because, unless the boxer gets an exception, the state did not allow people of 36 years of age or older to be boxers. Despite the suspensions in California and Nevada, Henderson continued boxing in other states. Five states, including Texas, granted Henderson boxing licenses after California suspended its license of Henderson.

Elmo Henderson used to train at Archie Moore's gym on the corner of Sage and Gateway in Vallejo, California. Archie Moore was the Light Heavyweight champion and had lost to Cassius Clay (Muhammad Ali) on November 15, 1962. Henderson had fought Ernie Shavers on October 29, 1971, in Stateline, Nevada and was knocked out in the fourth round, Shavers was the hardest puncher that Henderson had ever encountered during his career, at that time Ernie Shavers had never lost and during the year 1971 alone Shavers had 17 professional fights and won them all and most by knockouts.

Elmo Henderson claimed he defeated Muhammad Ali in an exhibition match during the "Muhammad Ali Boxing Show" in San Antonio, Texas on October 24, 1972. In the exhibition, Henderson won the crowd over in the first round by mimicking Ali's dancing style and grinned at Ali while dancing around the ring. Ali, sensing he was losing the crowd to the local fighter, took Henderson as a formidable opponent in the second round and landed several punches in a row. Henderson then landed three punches in return. Ali's knees buckled, which witness say was in jest, but in between the second and third rounds, Ali ordered the referee to escort Henderson out of the ring, ending the exhibition [The News, San Antonio, TX, October 25, 1972, page 45]. He never achieved widespread fame in the boxing world. Due to his success against Ali during the 1972 exhibition match, Henderson served as a sparring partner and cheerleader in George Foreman's training camp in the Rumble in the Jungle event in Zaire. Norman Mailer wrote a Playboy article about Henderson in the May 1975 issue. The article included a false statement that said that Henderson had been "and not too recently released from Nevada State Hospital for the insane.", a mental hospital. Henderson filed a $1 million lawsuit against Mailer and Playboy. The magazine and Mailer lost the lawsuit. In 1977, the jury, located in Corpus Christi, Texas, awarded Henderson $105,000. Spong said that the lawsuit made Henderson, "[...]at least in his telling of the story, the first black man ever to win a libel suit against a white man." The federal court ordered the defendants to make the payment on November 16, 1977. Owen Cox, the judge, said that the amount was too high, and ordered that the plaintiff would either accept $25,000 or that the case goes to trial again. The defendants decided to pay a sum between the jury judgment and Cox's judgment to Henderson. Bill Nutto, Henderson's lawyer, does not state how many dollars the defendants paid to Henderson and Nutto. Henderson said that he received $40,000.

In 2003 Henderson was a homeless man in Austin, Texas.
