= West Tallahatchie School District =

School district in Mississippi, United States

The West Tallahatchie School District (WTSD) is a public school district with its headquarters in the Charles M. George Facility for Educational Services in unincorporated Tallahatchie County, Mississippi (USA), adjacent to Sumner.

In addition to Sumner, the district also serves the communities of Tutwiler, Webb, and Glendora. Additionally it includes unincorporated areas of Brazil, Philipp, and Vance. The parts of the Mintner City area in Tallahatchie County are in the West Tallahatchie district.

== History ==
In 1993 most classrooms were not air conditioned.

In 1997 the district got little money from local taxation, and it reported that it had a shortage of qualified teachers. Superintendent Reggie Barnes asked area housing authorities to build affordable housing next to West Tallahatchie High School so area teachers had affordable housing.

In 1999 there were two schools in the district, and both received intercom systems and were given a $1,071,000 renovation.

In 2022, West Tallahatchie High School received an award from GreatSchools.org as a College Success-Gold Honoree for its success in preparing its students for life and enrollment in both two-year and four-year colleges and universities, respectively.

== Schools ==
- West Tallahatchie High School (7-12) – In an unincorporated area near Webb.
- R. H. Bearden Elementary School (K-6) – Previously the "West District School", or West District Middle School.

Former schools

- T.Y. FLEMING ELEMENTARY SCHOOL (Glendora) – Served Kindergarten through grade 6 for southern portions of the school district. Cathy Hayden of The Clarion Ledger described the facility, adjacent to a radio antenna and with little signage that indicated its purpose, as "small". In 1989 the state awarded funding to have a computer lab built. In 1997 it had 210 students and eight teachers. Due to the expense of operating the school and because its students were unable to access programs available to students going to school in Sumner due to geographic distance, district leadership that year began proposing closing Black Bayou Elementary. The district decided to close the school in 1998. By 2004 it became a head start center of the organization Institute for Community Services (ICS).
- Brazil Consolidated School – It was previously a part of the Brazil Consolidated School District. Brazil formerly had its own school, with the final building built for $50,000 in 1936. In the 1940s the district made plans to build an expansion. The previous Brazil school was destroyed by a fire. Due to under enrollment, as the school had 40 students registered in 1965, it was closed that year. That year the school district put it up for sale.
- East District Elementary School – Grades 3-4
- Hopson Bayou Elementary School (Tutwiler) - Served Kindergarten through grade 6. It closed as a zoned school in 1993 and became an alternative school for troubled youth. In 1997 the district closed the Hopson Bayou campus and moved the alternative school to the former Sumner Elementary.
- Philipp Consolidated School (Philipp) – By 1957 the property was for sale
- Sumner Elementary School (Sumner) – Served Kindergarten through grade 2 for Sumner and Webb. By spring 1997 it became a kindergarten through grade 1 school. In 1997 it had 203 students. It closed in 1997 with all students transferred to Bearden School, and the district moved the alternative school to the former Sumner Elementary.

== Demographics ==
As of November 1997, 99% of the students were black and 1% was white. As of that time, 92% qualified for buying lunches at reduced or no expense. In 1999 there were 1,500 students.

=== 2007-08 school year ===
There were a total of 947 students enrolled in the West Tallahatchie School District during the 2007–2008 school year. The gender makeup of the district was 53% female and 47% male. The racial makeup of the district was 99.89% African American and 0.11% Hispanic.

=== Previous school years ===
| School Year | Enrollment | Gender Makeup | | Racial Makeup | | | | |
| School Year | Enrollment | Female | Male | Asian | African American | Hispanic | Native American | White |
|---|---|---|---|---|---|---|---|---|
| 2006-07 | 1,032 | 53% | 47% | – | 99.90% | 0.10% | – | – |
| 2005-06 | 1,034 | 51% | 49% | – | 99.10% | 0.10% | – | – |
| 2004-05 | 1,145 | 52% | 48% | 0.09% | 99.30% | 0.09% | – | 0.52% |
| 2003-04 | 1,152 | 51% | 49% | 0.17% | 99.48% | 0.17% | – | 0.17% |
| 2002-03 | 1,208 | 51% | 49% | 0.17% | 99.25% | 0.17% | – | 0.41% |

== Student achievement ==
In 1997 the graduation rate was 86%. The class of 1999 was the only class of the 1990s decade to graduate 100% of the seniors that enrolled.

=== Accountability statistics ===
| | 2007-08 | 2006-07 | 2005-06 | 2004-05 | 2003-04 | 2002-03 |
|---|---|---|---|---|---|---|
| District Accreditation Status | Accredited | Accredited | Accredited | Accredited | Accredited | Accredited |
School Performance Classifications
| Level 5 (Superior Performing) Schools | No School; Performance; Classifications; Assigned | 0 | 0 | 0 | 0 | 0 |
| Level 4 (Exemplary) Schools | No School; Performance; Classifications; Assigned | 0 | 0 | 0 | 0 | 0 |
| Level 3 (Successful) Schools | No School; Performance; Classifications; Assigned | 1 | 1 | 0 | 0 | 0 |
| Level 2 (Under Performing) Schools | No School; Performance; Classifications; Assigned | 1 | 1 | 2 | 1 | 2 |
| Level 1 (Low Performing) Schools | No School; Performance; Classifications; Assigned | 0 | 0 | 0 | 1 | 0 |
| Not Assigned | No School; Performance; Classifications; Assigned | 0 | 0 | 0 | 0 | 0 |

== Other facilities ==
The Charles M. George Facility for Educational Services, the headquarters of WTSD, was dedicated on July 23, 1995. Charles M. George, the headquarters' namesake, was a principal and a superintendent of the district.

As per the Mississippi Critical Teacher Shortage Act of 1998, a duplex was built for $200,000 next to West Tallahatchie High School. Priority was for district teachers but people not employed by the district are welcome to rent. In 2015 Monique Harrison-Henderson of The Hechinger Report stated "In the end, instead of being an exciting recruitment tool, the duplex has been filled in recent years by people with no direct ties to the school system."

== See also ==
- List of school districts in Mississippi
- LaLee's Kin: The Legacy of Cotton
