= Tutwiler, Mississippi =

- Town
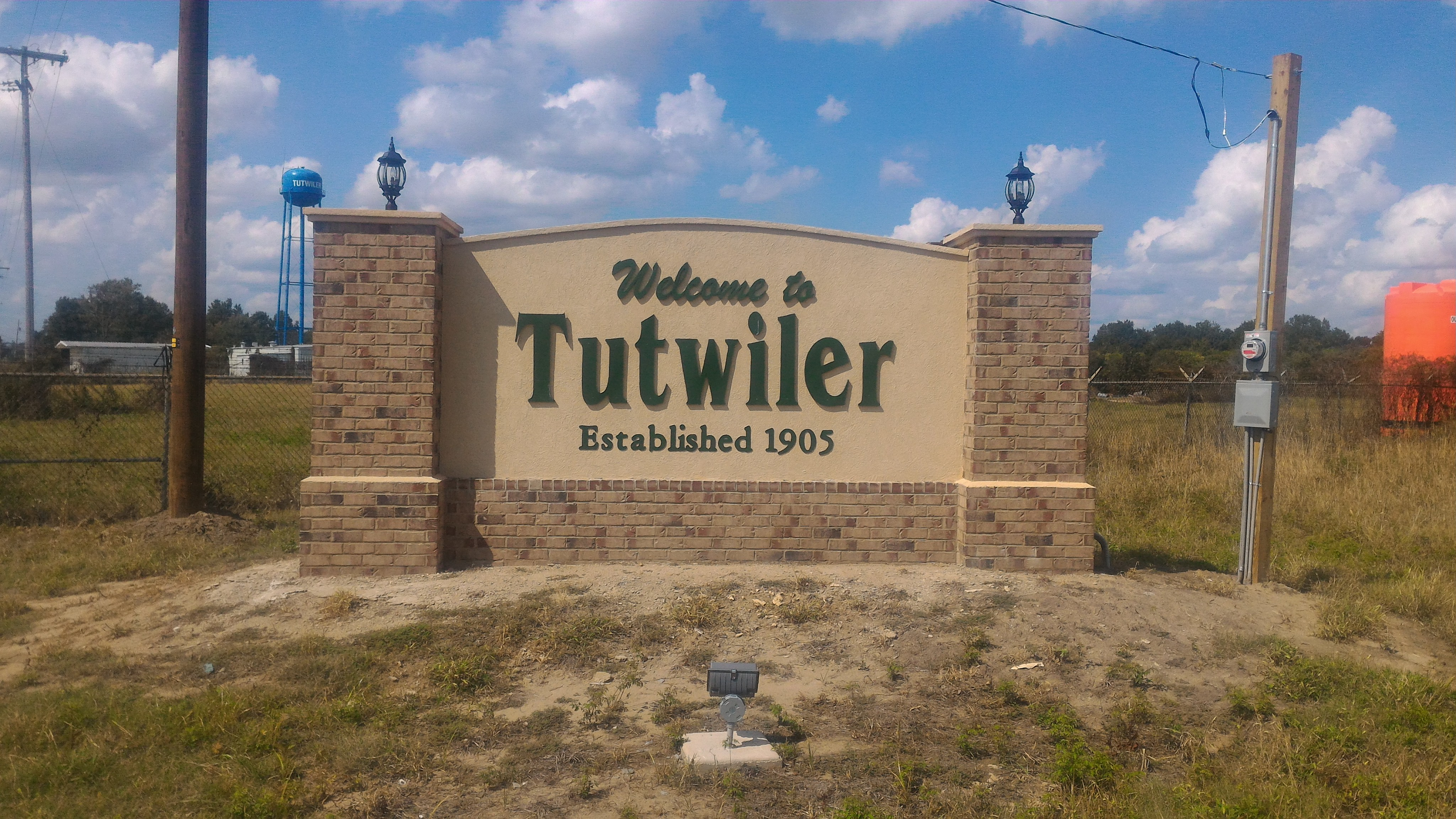

- Location of Tutwiler, Mississippi

- Location in the United States
- Coordinates: 34°01′02″N 90°26′00″W
- Country: United States
- State: Mississippi
- County: Tallahatchie

Area
  - Total: 2.77 sq mi (7.17 km^{2})
  - Land: 2.77 sq mi (7.17 km^{2})
  - Water: 0 sq mi (0.00 km^{2})
- Elevation: 154 ft (47 m)

Population (2020)
  - Total: 2,476
  - Density: 894.3/sq mi (345.28/km^{2})
- Time zone: UTC-6 (Central (CST))
  - Summer (DST): UTC-5 (CDT)
- ZIP code: 38963
- Area code: 662
- FIPS code: 28-75040
- GNIS feature ID: 2406769
- Website: tutwilerms.com

Tutwiler is a town in Tallahatchie County, Mississippi, United States. The population at the 2020 census was 2,476.

== History ==
In 1899, Tom Tutwiler, a civil engineer for a local railroad, made his headquarters seven miles northwest of Sumner. The town of Tutwiler was founded and named for him. When the railroad was built, the first depot erected was a two-story building. The railroad gave the town use of the top floor as a public school. Captain H.B. Fitch built and operated the first store in town. His wife took charge of the school, which began with five pupils.

In 1900, a Black mob murdered a Black man remembered as "Dago Pete." He was suspected of attacking local women.

In 1905, the town was incorporated, and W.E. Fite elected Mayor. J.O. Clay was the station depot agent. In 1900, the Illinois Central Railroad, running from Yazoo City to Lambert, crossed at Tutwiler, where the company built a railroad yard.

In 1928, a high school was built at a cost of $40,000. The town grew rapidly until 1929 when the railroad yard was moved to Clarksdale. At that time businesses and finally the population began to decline. The population in 1929 before the railroad yard was moved was 1,010 people.

Like many other towns in the Mississippi Delta, Tutwiler stakes a claim to being the "birthplace of the blues". This is the site where W. C. Handy reportedly "discovered" the blues in 1903, on a train platform in the town. Handy had heard something akin to the blues as early as 1892, but it was while waiting for an overdue train to Memphis that he heard an itinerant bluesman (legend says it was a local field hand named Henry Sloan). The man was playing slide guitar and singing about "goin' where the Southern cross the Dog", referring to the junction of the Southern Railway and Yazoo and Mississippi Valley Railroad farther south. (The Y&D railroad was locally called the "Yellow Dog"). Handy called it "the weirdest music I had ever heard". A Mississippi Blues Trail marker honoring Handy was erected at the site on November 25, 2009. The historic marker was paid for by Robert Plant and Plant attended the dedication and gave a speech about the Blues and how he was influenced by Sonny Boy Williamson II. Plant said "The first record my mom bought me was by Sonny Boy, I played it until there were no more groves on the record". Sonny Boy's resting place is just at the edge of the Tutwiler City limits. Plant and Jimmy Page visit Tutwiler often. "It is a wonderful place to connect to the music that changed my life and musical direction, a magic place." Tutwiler was also the childhood home of bluesmen John Lee Hooker and Frank Stokes.

Handy and his family lived there for six years. In 1903, while waiting for a train in Tutwiler, in the Mississippi Delta, Handy had the following experience:

A lean loose-jointed Negro had commenced plunking a guitar beside me while I slept ... As he played, he pressed a knife on the strings of the guitar in a manner popularized by Hawaiian guitarists who used steel bars. ... The singer repeated the line three times, accompanying himself on the guitar with the weirdest music I had ever heard.

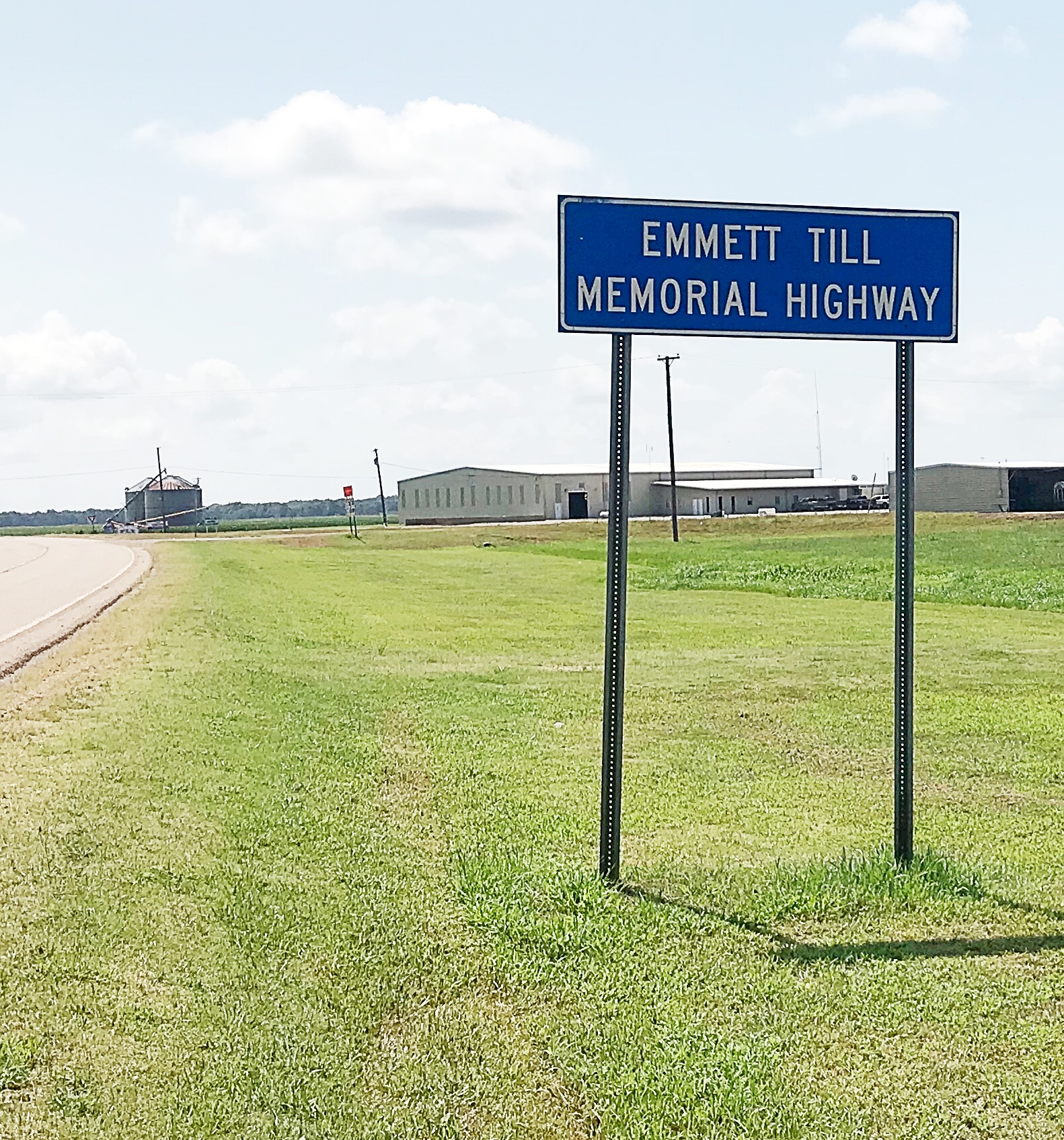
Emmett Till Memorial Highway, US 49E, Tutwiler, Mississippi, 2019

== Geography ==
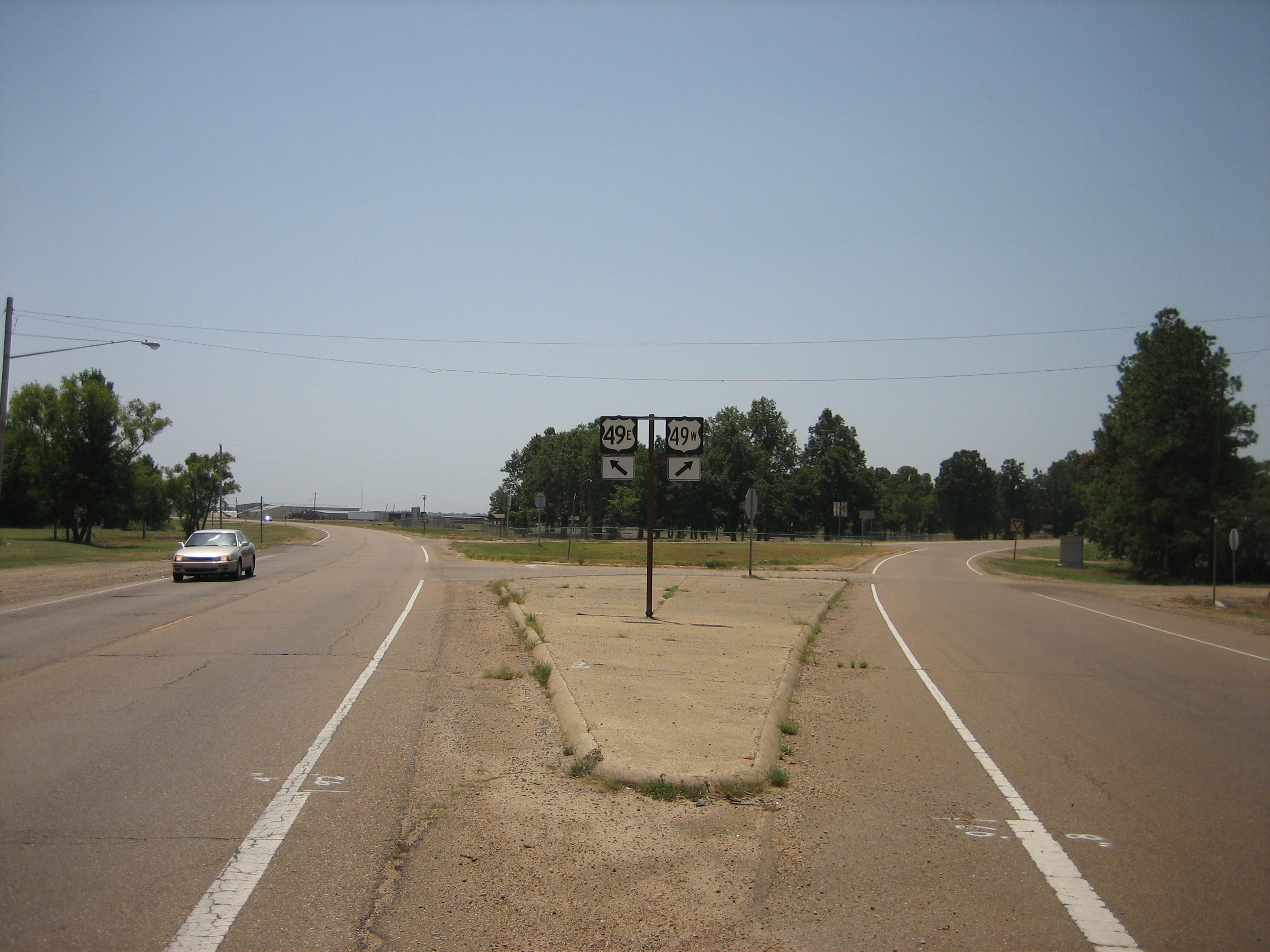
Split of U.S. Route 49 in Tutwiler

According to the United States Census Bureau, the town has a total area of 1.3 square miles (3.4 km^{2}), all land. Tutwiler is 70 miles (110 km) south of Memphis, Tennessee.

== Demographics ==
Historical population
Census	Pop.	Note	%±
1900	142		—
1910	410		188.7%
1920	1,010		146.3%
1930	873		−13.6%
1940	665		−23.8%
1950	939		41.2%
1960	912		−2.9%
1970	1,103		20.9%
1980	1,174		6.4%
1990	1,391		18.5%
2000	1,364		−1.9%
2010	3,550		160.3%
2020	2,476		−30.3%
U.S. Decennial Census

=== Racial and ethnic composition ===
Tutwiler town, Mississippi – Racial and ethnic composition Note: the US Census treats Hispanic/Latino as an ethnic category. This table excludes Latinos from the racial categories and assigns them to a separate category. Hispanics/Latinos may be of any race.
Race / Ethnicity (NH = Non-Hispanic)	Pop 2000	Pop 2010	Pop 2020	% 2000	% 2010	% 2020
White alone (NH)	160	667	527	11.73%	18.79%	21.28%
Black or African American alone (NH)	1,186	1,903	1,583	86.95%	53.61%	63.93%
Native American or Alaska Native alone (NH)	4	16	1	0.29%	0.45%	0.04%
Asian alone (NH)	5	94	0	0.37%	2.65%	0.00%
Native Hawaiian or Pacific Islander alone (NH)	0	11	0	0.00%	0.31%	0.00%
Other race alone (NH)	0	15	0	0.00%	0.42%	0.00%
Mixed race or Multiracial (NH)	3	45	9	0.22%	1.27%	0.36%
Hispanic or Latino (any race)	6	799	356	0.44%	22.51%	14.38%
Total	1,364	3,550	2,476	100.00%	100.00%	100.00%

=== 2020 census ===
As of the 2020 census, Tutwiler had a population of 2,476. The median age was 32.7 years. 9.9% of residents were under the age of 18 and 5.8% of residents were 65 years of age or older. For every 100 females, there were 355.1 males, and for every 100 females age 18 and over there were 466.5 males.

0.0% of residents lived in urban areas, while 100.0% lived in rural areas.

There were 355 households, of which 34.6% had children under the age of 18 living in them. Of all households, 27.0% were married-couple households, 23.4% were households with a male householder and no spouse or partner present, and 44.2% were households with a female householder and no spouse or partner present. About 27.9% of all households were made up of individuals, and 8.5% had someone living alone who was 65 years of age or older.

There were 380 housing units, of which 6.6% were vacant. The homeowner vacancy rate was 0.0% and the rental vacancy rate was 13.3%.

Racial composition as of the 2020 census
Race	Number	Percent
White	827	33.4%
Black or African American	1,629	65.8%
American Indian and Alaska Native	1	0.0%
Asian	0	0.0%
Native Hawaiian and Other Pacific Islander	0	0.0%
Some other race	7	0.3%
Two or more races	12	0.5%

=== 2000 census ===
As of the census of 2000, there were 1,364 people, 410 households, and 316 families residing in the town. The population density was 1,020.6 inhabitants per square mile (394.1/km^{2}). There were 429 housing units at an average density of 321.0 per square mile (123.9/km^{2}). The racial makeup of the town was 11.80% White, 87.32% African American, 0.29% Native American, 0.37% Asian, and 0.22% from two or more races. Hispanic or Latino of any race were 0.44% of the population.

There were 410 households, out of which 35.9% had children under the age of 18 living with them, 34.4% were married couples living together, 34.4% had a female householder with no husband present, and 22.7% were non-families. 20.0% of all households were made up of individuals, and 11.0% had someone living alone who was 65 years of age or older. The average household size was 3.33 and the average family size was 3.82.

In the town, the population was spread out, with 33.6% under the age of 18, 11.7% from 18 to 24, 26.1% from 25 to 44, 16.3% from 45 to 64, and 12.2% who were 65 years of age or older. The median age was 29 years. For every 100 females, there were 80.4 males. For every 100 females age 18 and over, there were 76.3 males.

The median income for a household in the town was $18,958, and the median income for a family was $22,857. Males had a median income of $21,364 versus $17,222 for females. The per capita income for the town was $7,177. About 32.1% of families and 38.5% of the population were below the poverty line, including 45.5% of those under age 18 and 31.1% of those age 65 or over.

== Economy ==
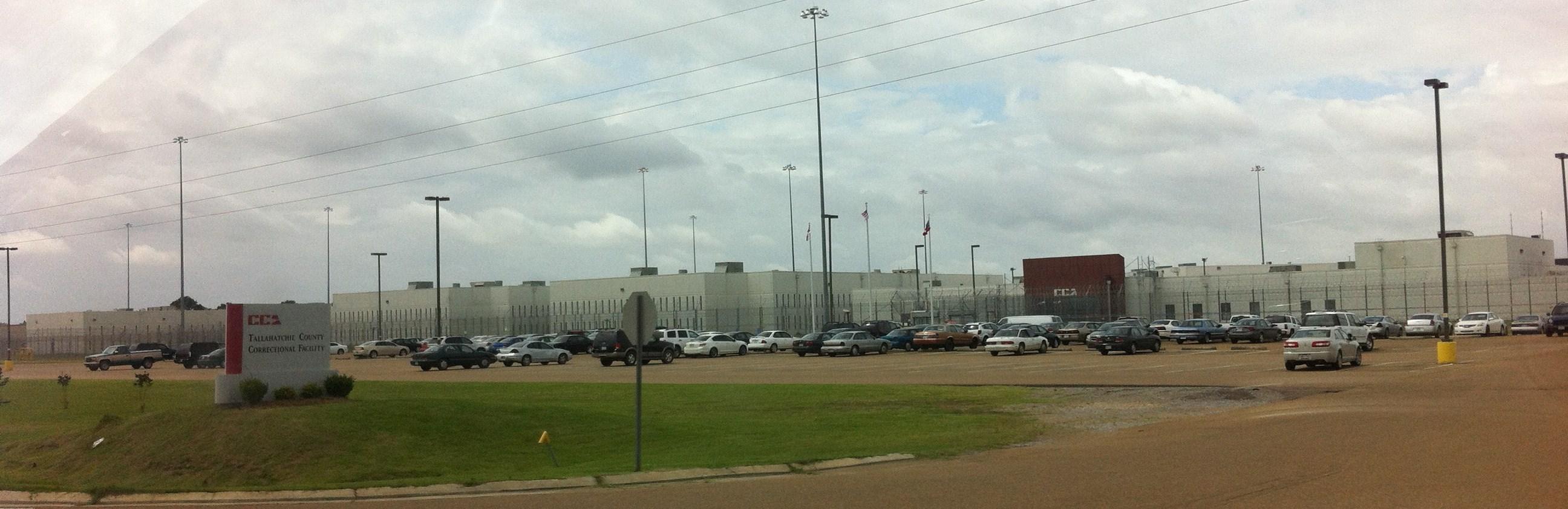
Tallahatchie County Correctional Facility

Peter T. Kilborn of The New York Times said in 2001 that, "Except for cotton, there has never been much to Tutwiler's economy." As of 2001, Tutwiler residents work in prisons located throughout the Mississippi Delta, casinos in Tunica Resorts, and poultry and chicken processing plants in the surrounding area.

The town's sole bank and grain elevator closed in 2000. As of 2001 Tutwiler did not have any clothing stores, drugstores, or restaurants.

Tallahatchie County Correctional Facility, a private prison operated by CoreCivic, Inc for the Mississippi Department of Corrections, is located near Tutwiler in an unincorporated area in the county. Due to the town's poor economic status, around 1998 the leaders of Tutwiler decided to agree to construction of a prison nearby, which would provide hundreds of jobs.

To help facilitate the prison, the Town of Tutwiler constructed a sewage lagoon and a water tower. The State of Mississippi and Tallahatchie County paid half of the cost of training of the correctional officers at the new prison. Kilborn said that when the $35 million facility opened in 2000 with 351 prisoners, including 322 from Wisconsin, it "seemed the salvation of" Tutwiler. Some area residents quit their jobs and began working as prison guards at the facility. After the prison's opening, its monthly payroll was $467,000.

In March and April 2001 Wisconsin moved its prisoners out of the prison, leaving about 20 to 125 prisoners per period. Before this change, the prison had 208 employees. The prison's employees were reduced to 40. Hundreds of people who had worked at the prison were laid off. As of 2001, the prison had paid $600,000 to the county in property taxes annually and $5,350 per month to the town for water. By the end of 2001 the total monthly payroll decreased to $80,000.

Kilborn said that by November 2001 the prison "left the town little better off than it ever was." In June 2003 the prison received 1,423 inmates from Alabama, and the prison hired 250 employees during that year to care for them. By 2010 the prison was also incarcerating sentenced prisoners from California.

== Government and infrastructure ==
Robert Grayson made history in 1993 by being elected as the first African-American mayor of Tutwiler. He was a former corrections officer at the Mississippi State Penitentiary (Parchman) in Sunflower County. Grayson was succeeded in 2009 by Genether Miller Spurlock, a former schoolteacher, and first black woman to be elected as mayor. The current mayor of Tutwiler is Nichole Harris-Rosebud. The town maintains a police force of about ten police officers. The United States Postal Service operates the Tutwiler Post Office.

Tallahatchie County Correctional Facility, a private prison operated by the Corrections Corporation of America on behalf of the Mississippi Department of Corrections, is located in an unincorporated area in Tallahatchie County, near Tutwiler. As of 2010 the prison serves as the Tallahatchie County's jail facility, in addition to housing primarily prison inmates sentenced by California courts.

== Education ==
The Town of Tutwiler is served by the West Tallahatchie School District. Residents are zoned to R.H. Bearden Elementary School near Sumner and West Tallahatchie High School near Webb. Hopson Bayou Elementary School served children in Tutwiler, until it closed as a zoned school in 1993 and became an alternative school for troubled youth. In 1997 the district closed the Hopson Bayou campus and moved the alternative school to the former Sumner Elementary. Previously West District Middle School (now Bearden School) served as a middle school for the area.

As of 2002 some children in Tutwiler attended the North Sunflower Academy, a private school, in unincorporated Sunflower County, Others attended private schools Delta Academy in Marks, and Lee Academy in Clarksdale.

== Religion ==
Tutwiler has a variety of Christian churches, including Baptist, Church of God In Christ, Protestant, and non-denominational.

Seven Catholic nuns and their staff operate community services in the town, mainly at the Tutwiler Community Education Center, which was established in 1993. They operate the site of town meetings and voting, direct outreach programs for children and senior citizens, operate a health clinic, and maintain the grave of Sonny Boy Williamson.

In 1983, a nun, Sister Anne Brooks, came to Tutwiler to manage the Tutwiler Clinic after earning a medical degree. Before Brooks came, the clinic still had racially segregated waiting rooms. As of 2010 the clinic had been operating for 27 years. In November 2010 the nuns opened a gymnasium, funded by donors from outside the area. New York Times journalist Peter T. Kilborn wrote that the facility was "worthy of a university".

== Notable residents ==
- Anne Brooks, Roman Catholic religious sister, family medicine physician and founder of the Tutwiler Clinic
- James Ozro Day, former member of the Mississippi Senate
- Gene Guess, member of the Alaska House of Representatives from 1965 to 1973
- John Lee Hooker, blues singer; was born in or near Tutwiler
- Willie Kizart, electric blues guitarist
- Mary Martha Presley Merritt, politician, was born here
- Aldon Morris, scholar
- Vera Pigee, civil rights worker
- James E. Sherrard III, Chief of Air Force Reserve and commander of the United States Air Force Reserve Command
- Frank Stokes, blues musician
- Sonny Boy Williamson II, blues singer, harmonica player; was born in or near Tutwiler.

== See also ==
- Emmett Till
- Origins of the blues
