= Glendora, Mississippi =

Village in Mississippi, United States

- Village
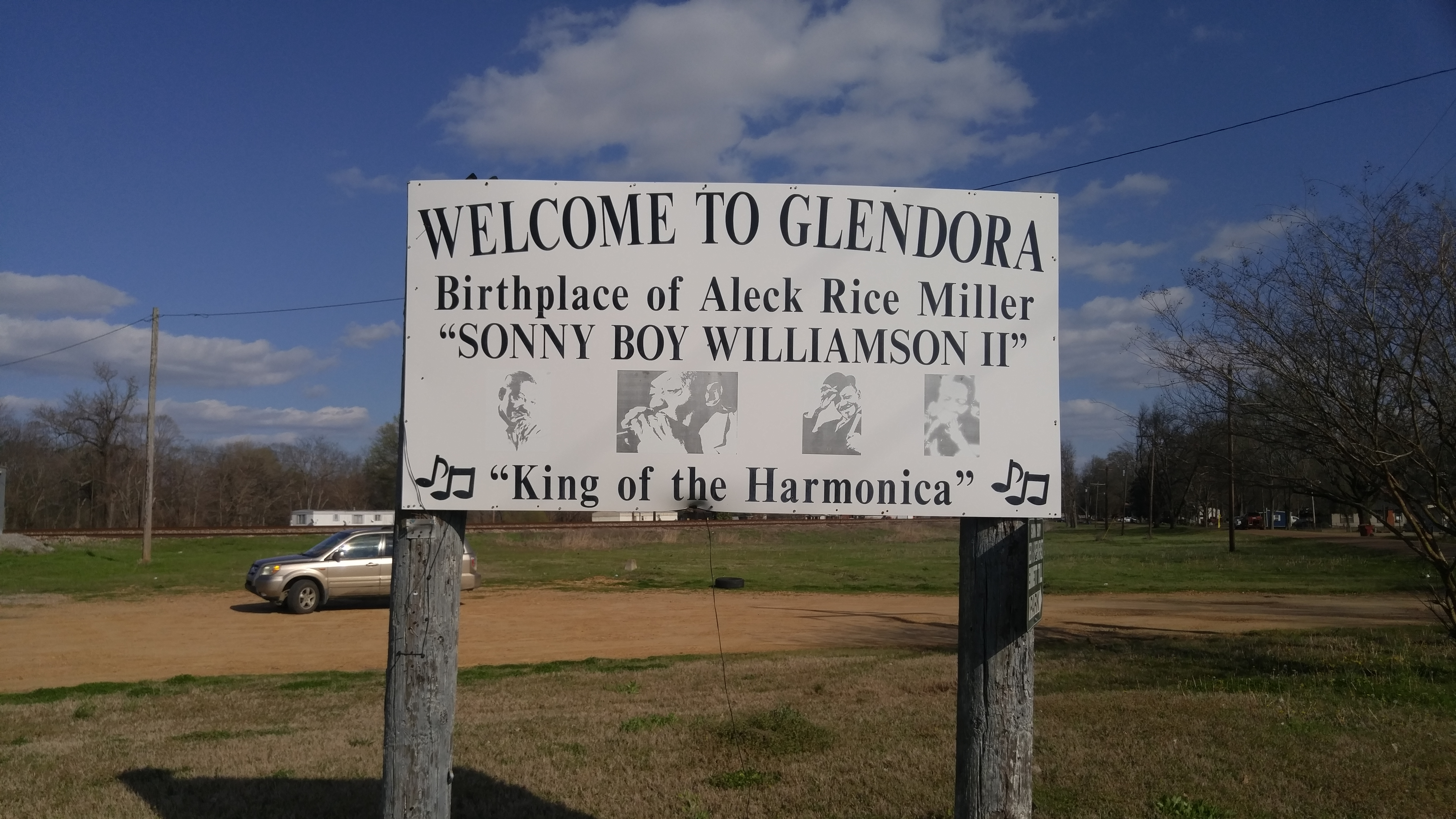

- Location of Glendora, Mississippi

- Location in the United States
- Coordinates: 33°49′40″N 90°17′34″W
- Country: United States
- State: Mississippi
- County: Tallahatchie

Area
  - Total: 0.14 sq mi (0.37 km^{2})
  - Land: 0.14 sq mi (0.37 km^{2})
  - Water: 0 sq mi (0.00 km^{2})
- Elevation: 144 ft (44 m)

Population (2020)
  - Total: 154
  - Density: 1,066.7/sq mi (411.86/km^{2})
- Time zone: UTC-6 (Central (CST))
  - Summer (DST): UTC-5 (CDT)
- ZIP code: 38928
- Area code: 662
- FIPS code: 28-27660
- GNIS feature ID: 2407465

Glendora is a village in Tallahatchie County, Mississippi. The population was 154 at the 2020 census.

== History ==
Glendora was developed by Americans as a small sawmill site. Logs were floated down the river from around the vicinity of Webb to be processed here.

The first settlement developed two miles south of Glendora at Black Bayou. When the railroad was built through the territory in 1883, a station was located there and called Glendora. The town immediately grew. A post office was established in 1900 and a voting precinct was established.

Cane Lake Lumber Company built a large sawmill here which operated until 1909. It was moved to another site.

In December 1955, Elmer Kimbrell, a white man, shot and killed Clinton Melton, an African-American resident, in front of three witnesses after an argument about how much gas Melton had pumped into Kimbrell's car. Kimbrell was acquitted by an all-white jury after a short trial. Shortly before this murder, he was involved in the Emmett Till murder in Money, Mississippi. At this time, most blacks in Mississippi were still disenfranchised due to state barriers; they were not part of the jury pool because they were not registered voters and they were excluded from the political system.

== Geography ==
According to the United States Census Bureau, the village has a total area of 0.1 square miles (0.26 km^{2}), all land.

== Demographics ==
Historical population
Census	Pop.	Note	%±
1910	207		—
1940	247		—
1950	178		−27.9%
1960	147		−17.4%
1970	201		36.7%
1980	220		9.5%
1990	165		−25.0%
2000	285		72.7%
2010	151		−47.0%
2020	154		2.0%
U.S. Decennial Census

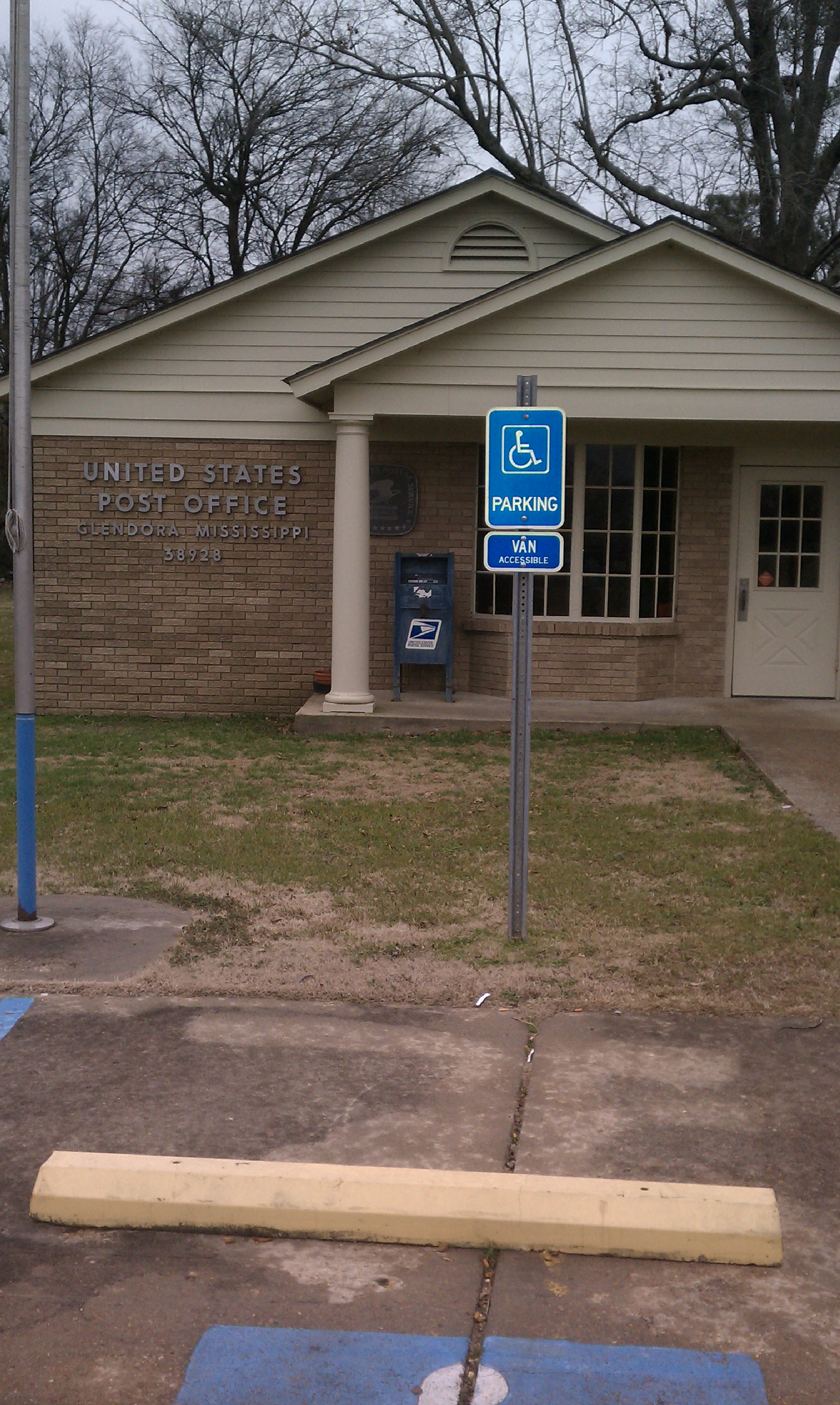
Glendora, Mississippi Post Office

=== Racial and ethnic composition ===
Glendora village, Mississippi – Racial and ethnic composition Note: the US Census treats Hispanic/Latino as an ethnic category. This table excludes Latinos from the racial categories and assigns them to a separate category. Hispanics/Latinos may be of any race.
Race / Ethnicity (NH = Non-Hispanic)	Pop 2000	Pop 2010	Pop 2020	% 2000	% 2010	% 2020
White alone (NH)	13	1	4	4.56%	0.66%	2.60%
Black or African American alone (NH)	254	146	145	89.12%	96.69%	94.16%
Native American or Alaska Native alone (NH)	2	2	0	0.70%	1.32%	0.00%
Asian alone (NH)	0	0	0	0.00%	0.00%	0.00%
Native Hawaiian or Pacific Islander alone (NH)	0	0	0	0.00%	0.00%	0.00%
Other race alone (NH)	0	0	0	0.00%	0.00%	0.00%
Mixed race or Multiracial (NH)	7	0	3	2.46%	0.00%	1.95%
Hispanic or Latino (any race)	9	2	2	3.16%	1.32%	1.30%
Total	285	151	154	100.00%	100.00%	100.00%

=== 2000 census ===
At the 2000 census, there were 285 people, 69 households and 60 families residing in the village. The population density was 2,011.5 inhabitants per square mile (776.6/km^{2}). There were 73 housing units at an average density of 515.2 per square mile (198.9/km^{2}). The racial makeup was 4.56% White, 92.28% African American, 0.70% Native American, and 2.46% from two or more races. Hispanic or Latino of any race were 3.16% of the population.

There were 69 households, of which 55.1% had children under the age of 18 living with them, 29.0% were married couples living together, 50.7% had a female householder with no husband present, and 11.6% were non-families. 8.7% of all households were made up of individuals, and 2.9% had someone living alone who was 65 years of age or older. The average household size was 4.13 and the average family size was 4.26.

41.8% of the population were under the age of 18, 15.4% from 18 to 24, 23.2% from 25 to 44, 14.7% from 45 to 64, and 4.9% who were 65 years of age or older. The median age was 21 years. For every 100 females, there were 82.7 males. For every 100 females age 18 and over, there were 82.4 males.

The median household income was $14,375 and the median family income was $11,875. Males had a median income of $17,500 compared with $11,250 for females. The per capita income for the village was $7,044. About 68.2% of families and 62.6% of the population were below the poverty line, including 83.3% of those under the age of 18 and 40.0% of those 65 or over.

== Education ==
The Village of Glendora is served by the West Tallahatchie School District. R. H. Bearden Elementary School and West Tallahatchie High School are the area schools.

Previously Black Bayou Elementary School served children in Glendora and southern parts of the district. The district decided to close Black Bayou in 1998. Previously West District Middle School (now Bearden) served as a middle school for the area.

Coahoma Community College is the designated community college.

== Notable people ==
- William Harris, country blues singer and guitarist
- Sonny Boy Williamson (Alex "Rice" Miller), the influential blues musician, and Mississippi Musicians Hall of Famer was born on a plantation near Glendora in 1912.
