= Maudrie M. Walton Elementary School =

Public school in Texas, United States

Coordinates: 32.7214°N 97.2295°W

- Stop Six, Fort Worth, Texas; United States

Information
- Enrollment: 328 (2021-2022)

Maudrie M. Walton Elementary School is a public elementary school in Stop Six, Fort Worth, Texas. It is a part of the Fort Worth Independent School District. In 2003 PBS released a documentary called A Tale of Two Schools which features the school's reputational growth and educational methods used from fall 2000 to spring 2001, along that with those of R. H. Bearden Elementary School in Tallahatchie County, Mississippi.

According to The Texas Tribune, the school had 328 students for the 2021-2022 school year. Of those, 68.9% were considered possible future drop-outs. In general, the teacher salaries were higher than the state-wide average. The school serves area public housing. It previously had a reputation as among the lowest performing schools in Fort Worth, but by the early 2000s had among the highest rankings. Walton achieved the "recognized" ranking from the Texas Education Agency (TEA). The school used the "Reading Mastery" program to increase its test scores.

Following a 2020 library fire believed to have been an act of arson, the Junior League of Fort Worth, Inc. (JLFW) held an online book drive to replenish the library's holdings.
